= 5th Helpmann Awards =

Australian live performance awards held in 2005

The 5th Annual Helpmann Awards for live performance in Australia were held on 8 August 2005 at the Lyric Theatre in Sydney.

The Sapphires by Tony Briggs, produced by Melbourne Theatre Company, was named Best Play and Best New Australian Work. The Australian production of Broadway musical The Producers received five awards including Best Musical. State Opera of South Australia's season of Wagner's Ring Cycle received ten awards including Best Opera and Best Special Event.

== Winners and nominees ==
In the following tables, winners are listed first and highlighted in boldface. The nominees are those which are listed below the winner and not in boldface.

=== Theatre ===
Best Play	Best Direction of a Play
**The Sapphires – Melbourne Theatre Company**; 12 Angry Men – Arts Projects Australia and Adrian Bohm; Hedda Gabler – Sydney Theatre Company; Three Furies – Sydney Festival in association with the Adelaide Festival of Arts, Perth International Arts Festival, Griffin Theatre Company and Sydney Opera House	**Jim Sharman – Three Furies**; Michael Blakemore – Democracy (Sydney Theatre Company); Wesley Enoch – Riverland (Windmill Performing Arts); Robyn Nevin – Hedda Gabler
Best Female Actor in a Play	Best Male Actor in a Play
**Cate Blanchett – Hedda Gabler**; Deborah Mailman – The Sapphires; Julie Forsyth – The Ham Funeral (Malthouse Theatre); Pamela Rabe – Dinner (Melbourne Theatre Company)	**Robert Menzies – Journal of the Plague Year (Malthouse Theatre)**; Aaron Pedersen – Eating Ice Cream With Your Eyes Closed (Queensland Theatre Company); Richard Piper – The Daylight Atheist (Melbourne Theatre Company); William Zappa – Death of a Salesman (State Theatre Company of South Australia)
Best Female Actor in a Supporting Role in a Play	Best Male Actor in a Supporting Role in a Play
**Zoe Carides – Influence (Sydney Theatre Company)**; Justine Clarke – Hedda Gabler; Amber McMahon – Afternoon of the Elves (Windmill Performing Arts and State Theatre Company of South Australia); Kerry Walker – The Spook (Company B)	**Anthony Weigh – Hedda Gabler**; Hugo Weaving – Hedda Gabler; John Gaden – Democracy; Robert Menzies – The Ham Funeral

=== Musicals ===
Best Musical
**The Producers - The New Mel Brooks Musical – SEL & GFO and Bialystock & Bloom New York Co.**; The Black Rider – Sydney Festival in association with International Concert Attractions and Andrew Kay & Associates; Eureka – Simon Gallaher and Michael Harvey; Urinetown, the Musical – Melbourne Theatre Company
Best Direction of a Musical	Best Choreography in a Musical
**Susan Stroman – The Producers - The New Mel Brooks Musical**; Stuart Maunder – HMS Pinafore and Trial By Jury (Opera Australia); Simon Phillips – Urinetown, the Musical; Robert Wilson – The Black Rider	**Susan Stroman – The Producers - The New Mel Brooks Musical**; Ross Coleman – Urinetown, the Musical; Paul Mercurio – Annie Get Your Gun (The Production Company); Arlene Phillips – Saturday Night Fever (Robert Stigwood in association with Adam Spiegel Productions, International Concert Attractions and David Atkins)
Best Female Actor in a Musical	Best Male Actor in a Musical
**Chloë Dallimore – The Producers - The New Mel Brooks Musical**; Bridget Boyle – The Venetian Twins (Queensland Theatre Company in association with QPAC and Brisbane Festival); Lisa McCune – Urinetown, the Musical; Emma Matthews – The Mikado (Opera Australia)	**Mitchell Butel – The Venetian Twins**; Kane Alexander – Urinetown, the Musical; Shane Bourne – Urinetown, the Musical; Reg Livermore – The Producers - The New Mel Brooks Musical
Best Female Actor in a Supporting Role in a Musical	Best Male Actor in a Supporting Role in a Musical
**Amanda Muggleton – Eureka**; Monique Montez – Saturday Night Fever; Christen O'Leary – Urinetown, the Musical; Meredith O'Reilly – The Producers - The New Mel Brooks Musical	**Tony Sheldon – The Producers - The New Mel Brooks Musical**; Sandro Colarelli – The Venetian Twins; Gerry Connolly – Urinetown, the Musical; Matt McGrath – The Black Rider

=== Opera and Classical Music ===
Best Opera	Best Direction of an Opera
**The Ring Cycle – State Opera of South Australia**; Der Rosenkavalier – Opera Australia; The Love for Three Oranges – Opera Australia; Madeline Lee – Opera Australia	**Elke Neidhardt – The Ring Cycle**; Stuart Maunder – Manon (Opera Australia); Patrick Nolan – Il Combattimento di Tancredi e Clorinda (Opera Australia); Francesca Zambello – The Love for Three Oranges
Best Female Performer in an Opera	Best Male Performer in an Opera
**Lisa Gasteen – The Ring Cycle**; Cheryl Barker – Tosca (Opera Australia); Bernadette Cullen – Il Trovatore (Opera Australia); Tiffany Speight – The Magic Flute (Die Zauberflöte) (Opera Australia)	**John Wegner – The Ring Cycle**; Peter Coleman-Wright – Tosca; Michael Lewis – Madeline Lee; Peter Rose – Der Rosenkavalier
Best Female Performer in a Supporting Role in an Opera	Best Male Performer in a Supporting Role in an Opera
**Deborah Riedel – The Ring Cycle**; Fiona Janes – Norma (Opera Australia and West Australian Opera); Emma Matthews – Der Rosenkavalier; Tiffany Speight – The Merry Widow (Opera Australia)	**Stuart Skelton – The Ring Cycle**; José Carbo – Madeline Lee; Christopher Lincoln – Madeline Lee; Bruce Martin – Nabucco (Opera Australia)
Best Classical Concert Presentation	Best Performance in a Classical Concert
**12 Angry Cellos – Sydney Festival**; Dean: Moments of Bliss – (Electrolux Master Series) – Melbourne Symphony Orchestra; Verdi's Messa da Requiem – (Tsunami Relief Benefit Concert) – Opera Australia and ABC Classic FM; St Matthew Passion – Perth International Arts Festival	**Simone Young** **– Simone Young Conducts Mahler (West Australian Symphony Orchestra)**; Vladimir Ashkenazy – Ashkenazy Sibelius Cycle (Sydney Symphony Orchestra); Simon Keenlyside – Winterreise (Melbourne International Arts Festival and Trisha Brown Dance Company); Richard Mills – The Struggle Continues - A Luta continua (Ten Days on the Island) (Tasmanian Symphony Orchestra)

=== Dance and Physical Theatre ===
Best Ballet or Dance Work	Best Visual or Physical Theatre Production
**Shen Wei Dance Arts – Sydney Festival in association with Sydney Opera House**; Already Elsewhere – Sydney Festival; Mr. B - A Tribute to George Balanchine – The Australian Ballet; Shades of Gray – Sydney Dance Company	**Compagnie Philippe Genty Vanishing Point – Arts Projects Australia**; The Lazy Kings – Sydney Festival; Provenance – Melbourne International Arts Festival and Ronnie Burkett Theatre of Marionettes; The Red Tree – Queensland Performing Arts Centre's Out of the Box Festival of Early Childhood Learning
Best Choreography in a Ballet or Dance Work
**Stephen Baynes – Unspoken Dialogues (Southern Lights) (The Australian Ballet)**; Graeme Murphy – Shades of Gray; Shen Wei – Shen Wei Dance Arts; Christopher Wheeldon – Continuum (Red Hot & New) (The Australian Ballet)
Best Female Dancer in a Ballet or Dance Work	Best Male Dancer in a Ballet or Dance Work
**Justine Summers – Unspoken Dialogues (Southern Lights)**; Wakako Asano – Shades of Gray; Lucinda Dunn – Almost Tango (Red Hot & New); Lynette Wills – El Tango (Southern Lights)	**Steven Heathcote – Unspoken Dialogues (Southern Lights)**; Joshua Consandine – Shades of Gray; Dein Perry – Dein Perry's Tap Dogs (Michael Chugg Entertainment, Definitive Events and Back Row Productions in association with Dein Perry and Nigel Triffit); Brett Simon – Dangerous Liaisons - The Ballet (West Australian Ballet)

=== Contemporary Music ===
Best Australian Contemporary Concert	Best Performance in an Australian Contemporary Concert
**Kura Tungar: Songs from the River - Ruby Hunter & Archie Roach – Melbourne International Arts Festival, Adelaide Festival Centre, Sydney Opera House and Australian Art Orchestra**; Missy Higgins – Harbour Agency; Tales of Time and Space – Sydney Festival in association with International Concert Attractions, Andrew Kay & Associates and Sydney Opera House; Women in Voice 14 – QPAC in association with Queensland Folk Federation and Annie Peterson	**Kate Miller-Heidke – Women in Voice 14**; Paul Grabowsky – Tales of Time and Space; Missy Higgins – Missy Higgins; Midnight Oil – WaveAid - the Tsunami Relief Concert (Michael Chugg Entertainment, Mark Pope Music and IMC)
Best Contemporary Music Festival	Best International Contemporary Music Concert
**The 16th Annual East Coast International Blues and Roots Music Festival** **– Peter Noble, Michael Chugg Entertainment, Definitive Events and Talentworks**; Womadelaide Sounds of the Planet 2005 – WOMADelaide Foundation and managed by Arts Projects Australia and WOMAD; Big Day Out 05 – Creative Festival Entertainment; 13th Annual Apollo Bay Music Festival – Apollo Bay Music Festival Committee of Management	**Bette Midler "Kiss My Brass" Tour – Garry Van Egmond, Michael Chugg and Jack Utsick**; Came So Far For Beauty: An Evening of Leonard Cohen Songs – Sydney Festival in association with International Concert Attractions, Andrew Kay & Associates and Sydney Opera House; Eagles Farewell Tour Australia 2004 – The Frontier Touring Company; k.d Lang in Concert with the Sydney Symphony – Dainty Consolidated Entertainment

=== Other ===
Best Presentation for Children	Best Special Event
**Riverland**; Gamegirl – Arena Theatre Company; Possum Magic - The Musical – Garry Ginivan Attractions in association with the Arts Centre; The Red Tree	**The Ring Cycle**; David Hare's Via Dolorosa – newtheatricals in association with Melbourne International Arts Festival, Melbourne Theatre Company and Sydney Theatre Company; Dein Perry's Tap Dogs 10th Anniversary Tour; WaveAid - The Tsunami Relief Concert

=== Industry ===
Best New Australian Work
**Tony Briggs – The Sapphires**; David Brown – Eating Ice Cream With Your Eyes Closed; John Haddock and Michael Campbell – Madeline Lee; Ros Horin – Through the Wire (Performing Lines in association with Melbourne Theatre Company)
Best Original Score	Best Music Direction
**Tom Waits – The Black Rider**; Mel Brooks – The Producers; Brett Collery – The Red Tree; John Haddock – Madeline Lee	**Asher Fisch – The Ring Cycle**; Ian McDonald – Urinetown, the Musical; Tom Woods – Madeline Lee; Peter Casey – The Producers - The New Mel Brooks Musical
Best Scenic Design	Best Costume Design
**Michael Scott-Mitchell – The Ring Cycle**; Richard Jeziorny – The Red Tree; Robert Kemp – The Venetian Twins; Robin Wagner – The Producers - The New Mel Brooks Musical	**Stephen Curtis – The Ring Cycle**; Robert Kemp – The Venetian Twins; William Ivey Long – The Producers - The New Mel Brooks Musical; Tatiana Noginova – The Love For Three Oranges
Best Lighting Design	Best Sound Design
**Matt Scott – Urinetown, the Musical**; Rachel Burke – Black Medea (Malthouse Theatre); Nick Schlieper – Hedda Gabler; Nick Schlieper – The Ring Cycle	**Max Lyandvert – Journal of the Plague Year**; Brett Collery – Eating Ice Cream With Your Eyes Closed; Kingsley Reeve – Zastozzi the Master of Discipline (Black Swan Theatre Company and Wesfarmers Arts); John Scandrett and Nick Reich – The Producers - The New Mel Brooks Musical

=== Lifetime Achievement ===
JC Williamson Award
- **Dame Joan Sutherland OM AC DBE**
- **David Williamson AO**
