= 1st Helpmann Awards =

2001 Australian awards for live performance

- Date: 25 March 2001
- Location: Lyric Theatre, Sydney
- Hosted by: Simon Burke

Television/radio coverage
- Network: No broadcast

The 1st Helpmann Awards ceremony was presented by the Australian Entertainment Industry Association (AEIA) (currently known by its trade name, Live Performance Australia), for achievements in disciplines of Australia's live performance sectors. The ceremony took place on 25 March 2001 at the Lyric Theatre, Sydney and was hosted by Simon Burke. During the ceremony, the AEIA handed out awards in twelve categories for achievements in theatre, musicals, opera, ballet, dance and concerts.

Australian works The Boy from Oz (musical), The Eighth Wonder (opera), Life After George (theatre) and the opening ceremony of the 2000 Olympics in Sydney were major award recipients.

== Winners and nominees ==
In the following tables, winners are listed first and highlighted in boldface.

=== Theatre ===
Best Play	Best Direction of a Play
**Life After George – Melbourne Theatre Company**; 'Art' – Melbourne Theatre Company; Jimmy and Pat Meet the Queen – Deckchair Theatre; The Small Poppies – Company B Belvoir	**Benedict Andrews – La Dispute (Sydney Theatre Company)**; Kate Cherry – Life After George; Neil Armfield – The Small Poppies; Simon Phillips – Measure for Measure (Melbourne Theatre Company)
Best Female Actor in a Play	Best Male Actor in a Play
**Caroline O'Connor – Piaf (Melbourne Theatre Company)**; Amanda Muggleton – The Book Club (International Concert Attractions); Leah Purcell – Box the Pony (Sydney Opera House); Robyn Nevin – A Cheery Soul (Company B Belvoir and Sydney Theatre Company)	**John Gaden – The Unexpected Man (Company B Belvoir and Melbourne Theatre Company)**; Bille Brown – Troilus and Cressida (Bell Shakespeare Company); Geoffrey Rush – The Small Poppies; Kim Gyngell – 'Art'

=== Musicals ===
Best Musical
**The Boy from Oz – Gannon Fox Productions**; Chicago – Barry & Fran Weissler, David Atkins Enterprises, IMG; Company – Melbourne Theatre Company; The Sound of Music – SEL & GFO
Best Direction of a Musical	Best Choreography in a Musical
**Gale Edwards – The Boy from Oz**; Nigel Jamieson – The Theft of Sita (Adelaide Festival and Performing Lines); Richard Wherrett – Shout! The Legend of the Wild One (Jacobsen Entertainment); Simon Phillips – Company	**Ann Reinking – Chicago**; Anthony Van Laast – The Boy from Oz; Kelley Abbey – Fame (Jacobsen Entertainment); Stephen Page – The Sunshine Club (Sydney Theatre Company)
Best Female Actor in a Musical	Best Male Actor in a Musical
**Sharon Millerchip – Chicago**; Chrissy Amphlett – The Boy from Oz; Leonie Page – Jolson (Jon Nicholls & Michael Brereton); Lisa McCune – The Sound of Music	**Todd McKenney – The Boy from Oz**; Anthony Warlow – Annie (SEL & GFO & Macks Entertainment); David Campbell – Shout! The Legend of the Wild One; Rob Guest – Jolson

=== Opera ===
Best Opera	Best Direction of an Opera
**The Eighth Wonder – Opera Australia**; Così fan tutte – Opera Queensland; Wozzeck – Opera Australia; Writing to Vermeer – Adelaide Festival	**Neil Armfield – The Eighth Wonder**; Barrie Kosky – Wozzeck; Lindy Hume – Orlando (West Australian Opera); Moffatt Oxenbould – Simon Boccanegra (Opera Australia)
Best Female Performer in an Opera	Best Male Performer in an Opera
**Anke Höppner – Madama Butterfly (Opera Australia)**; Clare Gormley – The Eighth Wonder; Regina Schörg – La traviata (Opera Australia); Yvonne Kenny – Capriccio (Opera Australia)	**Grant Smith – The Eighth Wonder**; Jonathan Summers – Simon Boccanegra; Jonathan Summers – Wozzeck; Timothy DuFore – Così fan tutte

=== Dance and Physical Theatre ===
Best Ballet or Dance Work	Best Visual or Physical Theatre Production
**Skin – Bangarra Dance Theatre**; Body of Work - A Retrospective – Sydney Dance Company; Coppélia – West Australian Ballet; Hydra – Chunky Move	**Slava's Snowshow – Backrow Productions (UK) and IMG**; Pom Pom – Patch Company; The Hobbit – Malcolm C. Cooke & Associates and Ztudio; Circus Oz – Circus Oz
Best Choreography in a Ballet or Dance Work
**Graeme Murphy – Body of Work – A Retrospective**; Meryl Tankard and Steven McTaggart – Deep Sea Dreaming – Olympic Opening Ceremony Sydney 2000 (Spectak Productions (Australia) for SOCOG); Stephen Page – Skin; Ted Brandsen – Carmen (West Australian Ballet)
Best Female Dancer in a Ballet or Dance Work	Best Male Dancer in a Ballet or Dance Work
**Miranda Coney – In the Upper Room (The Australian Ballet)**; Benazir Hussain – Carmen (West Australian Ballet); Janet Vernon – Body of Work – A Retrospective; Rachael Read – Bella Figura (The Australian Ballet)	**Steven Heathcote – In the Middle, Somewhat Elevated (The Australian Ballet)**; Christopher Harris – Mythologia (Sydney Dance Company); Graeme Murphy – Body of Work – A Retrospective; Steven Heathcote – Bella Figura (The Australian Ballet)

=== Industry ===
Best New Australian Work
**Stephen Page – Skin**; Hannie Rayson – Life After George; Nick Enright – The Boy from Oz; Nigel Jamieson – The Theft of Sita
Best Special Event or Performance
**Olympic Opening Ceremony Sydney 2000 – Spectak Productions (Australia) for SOCOG**; Cats national regional tour – Really Useful Productions & Ross Mollison Group; Plenty (2000 Adelaide Festival regional program) – Adelaide Festival; 2000 Adelaide Festival – Adelaide Festival
Best Original Score	Best Musical Direction
**Paul Grabowsky and I Wayan Gde Yudane – The Theft of Sita**; Carl Vine – Mythologia (Sydney Dance Company); Iain Grandage – Plainsong (Black Swan); Louis Andriessen – Writing to Vermeer	**Max Lambert – The Boy from Oz**; Ian McDonald – Piaf; Shao-Chia Lü – Madama Butterfly; Simone Young – Simon Boccanegra
Best Costume Design	Best Scenic Design
**Meryl Tankard** and **Dan Potra** – **Deep Sea Dreaming – Olympic Opening Ceremony Sydney 2000**; Bonita Bryg – Burn the Floor (Duet Entertainment); Dale Ferguson – Trelawny of the 'Wells' (Melbourne Theatre Company); Deborah McKendrick – Coppélia	**Peter England – Awakening – Olympic Opening Ceremony Sydney 2000**; Bill Haycock – Mirror Mirror (The Australian Ballet); Michael Scott-Mitchell – Il trovatore (Opera Queensland); Michael Simon – Writing to Vermeer
Best Lighting Design	Best Sound Design
**Trudy Dalgleish – The White Devil (Sydney Theatre Company)**; David Murray – Life After George; Karen Norris – Skin; Philip Lethlean – The Hobbit	**Bruce Jackson – Olympic Opening Ceremony Sydney 2000**; John Scandrett – Chicago; John Scandrett – The Sound of Music; Wyn Milsom – The Boy from Oz

=== Lifetime Achievement ===
JC Williamson Award
- **Ruth Cracknell AM**
- **Clifford Hocking AM**
