= Sydney Theatre Company =

Arts organisation in Australia

Coordinates: 33.855087°S 151.205757°E

- Industry: Theatre
- Founded: 1979; 47 years ago
- Headquarters: Sydney, Australia
- Products: Productions
- Website: www.sydneytheatre.com.au

Sydney Theatre Company (STC) is an Australian theatre company based in Sydney, New South Wales. The company performs in the Wharf Theatre at Dawes Point in The Rocks area of Sydney as well as the Roslyn Packer Theatre (formerly Sydney Theatre) and the Sydney Opera House Drama Theatre.

== History ==
Sydney Theatre Company was formed in December 1978, following the closure of the Old Tote Theatre Company the month before. The then premier, Neville Wran, approached Elizabeth Butcher who had been seconded from the National Institute of Dramatic Art (NIDA) to administer the Old Tote and asked her to set up a new state theatre company to perform in the drama theatre of the Sydney Opera House. Butcher established its legal identity and managerial structure and proposed the name 'Sydney Theatre Company' with John Clark (director of NIDA as the artistic adviser of the first season, five theatre companies were invited to produce six plays to be presented by STC as the 1979 interim season in the drama theatre. The first production, by the Paris Company, was A Cheery Soul by Patrick White (an Australian Nobel Laureate for Literature), directed by Jim Sharman and featuring Robyn Nevin as Miss Docker.

In June 1979, Richard Wherrett, then one of Nimrod Theatre's co-artistic directors, was appointed artistic director of STC to plan and organise activities for the 1980 season. The first STC-produced play was The Sunny South (1 January 1980) by George Darrell with music by Terence Clarke, directed by Richard Wherrett and assisted by John Gaden.

In its early years the company operated out of several rented premises around the city, producing 38 productions in five separate venues. Elizabeth Butcher, STC administrator, was given the task of finding one location that could house all the activities of the company, and a theatre. After an extensive search, Butcher had the vision to propose the derelict Walsh Bay Wharf 4/5 as STC's new home, immediately envisaging the capacity of the building to fulfil all requirements of space, location and additional venue. On 12 September 1983, the premier, Neville Wran, announced that the state government had approved the expenditure of $3.5 million to finance the project. The 60-year-old ironbark timber wharf warehouse was converted into premises suitable for creating, producing, performing and enjoying theatre.

The Wharf was officially handed over to STC in a plaque-unveiling ceremony on 13 December 1984. In 1985, The Wharf, by architects Vivian Fraser in association with NSW Govt Architect JW Thomson, won the Sir John Sulman Medal awarded by the Royal Australian Institute of Architects (NSW Chapter) for a work of excellence in public and commercial architecture. The first STC production in the Wharf Theatre (now Wharf 1), 17 January 1985, was Late Arrivals by Pamela van Amstel and directed by Wayne Harrison in his directorial debut. (Harrison went on to become the second artistic director of the company, in 1990.) The play was part of a season of one-act plays called Shorts at the Wharf.

Other performing arts companies and organisations later moved into the premises at The Wharf, including Sydney Dance Company, Ausdance, Sydney Philharmonia Choirs, Gondwana Choirs, Sydney Children's Choir, Australian Theatre for Young People, and Bangarra Dance Theatre. Nearly 25 years later The Wharf was presented the RAIA 25-Year Award for Enduring Architecture.

Directors working regularly for STC include Gale Edwards, Barrie Kosky, David Berthold, Neil Armfield, Benedict Andrews and Kip Williams. Many Australian actors who would later find wider success, such as Hugo Weaving, Geoffrey Rush, Cate Blanchett, Jacqueline McKenzie, Richard Roxburgh and Toni Collette, established their careers in STC productions.

Jo Dyer was executive producer of STC for ten years.

In January 2024, Alan Joyce who was also the CEO of Qantas, resigned.

== Artistic directors ==
Year	Artistic Director(s)	Notes
1978–79	Elizabeth Butcher	STC Administrator
1979	John Clark	STC Artistic Advisor
1979–1990	Richard Wherrett	
1990–1999	Wayne Harrison	
1999–2007	Robyn Nevin	
2008–2013	Cate Blanchett and Andrew Upton	
2013–2015	Andrew Upton	
2016	Jonathan Church	
2016–2024	Kip Williams	
2024–	Mitchell Butel	

== Greening the Wharf ==
The Sydney Theatre Company operates out of a heritage site of the wharf area of Sydney Harbour. Under the leadership of Blanchett and Upton, STC initiated a comprehensive large scale environmental program called Greening the Wharf, investing in solar energy, rainwater harvesting, energy efficiency measures and best practice waste management. The program goes beyond infrastructure projects to include employees, environmentally responsible theatre production, community engagement and education. The program won two Green Globe Awards.

== Awards and nominations ==
=== Helpmann Awards ===
The Helpmann Awards is an awards show, celebrating live entertainment and performing arts in Australia, presented by industry group Live Performance Australia since 2001. Note: 2020 and 2021 were cancelled due to the COVID-19 pandemic.

Year	Nominee / work	Award	Result	Ref.
2001	Benedict Andrews – La Dispute (Sydney Theatre Company)	Helpmann Award for Best Direction of a Play	Won	
2001	Robyn Nevin – A Cheery Soul (Company B Belvoir and Sydney Theatre Company)	Helpmann Award for Best Female Actor in a Play	Nominated	
2001	Stephen Page – The Sunshine Club (Sydney Theatre Company)	Helpmann Award for Best Choreography in a Musical	Nominated	
2001	Trudy Dalgleish – The White Devil (Sydney Theatre Company)	Helpmann Award for Best Lighting	Won	
2002	Three Sisters (Sydney Theatre Company)	Helpmann Award for Best Play	Nominated	
2002	Essie Davis – The School for Scandal (Sydney Theatre Company)	Best Female Actor in a Play	Nominated	
2002	Peter Carroll – The Christian Brothers (Sydney Theatre Company)	Helpmann Award for Best Male Actor in a Play	Nominated	
2002	Nick Enright – A Man with Five Children (Sydney Theatre Company)	Helpmann Award for Best New Australian Work	Nominated	
2002	Nigel Levings – The Old Masters (Sydney Theatre Company)	Best Lighting	Nominated	
2002	[ John Rayment – Up for Grabs (Sydney Theatre Company)	Best Lighting	Nominated	
2003	Copenhagen – Sydney Theatre Company	Best Play	Won	
2003	Deborah Mailman – Seven Stages of Grieving (Sydney Theatre Company)	Best Female Actor in a Play	Nominated	
2003	Miranda Otto – A Doll's House (Sydney Theatre Company)	Best Female Actor in a Play	Nominated	
2003	Deborah Kennedy – Soulmate (Sydney Theatre Company)	Helpmann Award for Best Female Actor in a Supporting Role in a Play	Nominated	
2003	Peter Carroll – Endgame (Sydney Theatre Company)	Best Male Actor in a Supporting Role in a Play	Won	
2003	Andree Greenwell – Volpone (Sydney Theatre Company)	Helpmann Award for Best Original Score	Nominated	
2004	Judy Davis – Victory (Sydney Theatre Company)	Best Female Actor in a Play	Nominated	
2004	Amber McMahon – The Snow Queen (Windmill Performing Arts and Sydney Theatre Company)	Best Female Actor in a Supporting Role in a Play	Nominated	
2004	Peter Carroll – The Republic of Myopia (Sydney Theatre Company)	Best Male Actor in a Supporting Role in a Play	Nominated	
2005	Hedda Gabler (Sydney Theatre Company)	Best Play	Nominated	
2005	Michael Blakemore – Democracy (Sydney Theatre Company)	Best Direction of a Play	Nominated	
2005	Zoe Carides – Influence (Sydney Theatre Company)	Best Female Actor in a Supporting Role in a Play	Won	
2006	Jennifer Flowers – Doubt: A Parable (Sydney Theatre Company)	Best Female Actor in a Play	Nominated	
2006	Robert Menzies – Julius Caesar (Sydney Theatre Company)	Best Male Actor in a Play	Nominated	
2006	Hamish Michael – Two Brothers (Melbourne Theatre Company & Sydney Theatre Company)	Best Male Actor in a Supporting Role in a Play	Nominated	
2006	Robyn Nevin – Summer Rain (Sydney Theatre Company)	Helpmann Award for Best Direction of a Musical	Nominated	
2006	Stella and the Moon Man – Kim Carpenter's Theatre of Image with Sydney Theatre Company and Australian Youth Orchestra	Helpmann Award for Best Presentation for Children	Won	
2007	The Lost Echo (Sydney Theatre Company)	Best Play	Won	
2007	The Season at Sarsaparilla (Sydney Theatre Company)	Best Play	Nominated	
2007	Pamela Rabe – Mother Courage and Her Children (Sydney Theatre Company)	Best Female Actor in a Play	Nominated	
2007	Jefferson Mays – I Am My Own Wife (Melbourne Theatre Company, Sydney Theatre Company and Hothouse Theatre)	Best Male Actor in a Play	Won	
2008	Susan Prior – Riflemind (Sydney Theatre Company)	Best Female Actor in a Supporting Role in a Play	Nominated	
2008	Alison Whyte – Don's Party (Melbourne Theatre Company and Sydney Theatre Company)	Best Female Actor in a Supporting Role in a Play	Nominated	
2008	Travis McMahon – Don's Party (Melbourne Theatre Company and Sydney Theatre Company)	Best Male Actor in a Supporting Role in a Play	Nominated	
2009	War of the Roses – Sydney Theatre Company (in association with the Sydney Festival and Perth International Arts Festival)	Best Play	Won	
2009	Women of Troy (Sydney Theatre Company)	Best Play	Nominated	
2009	Benedict Andrews – War of the Roses (Sydney Theatre Company)	Best Direction of a Play	Nominated	
2009	Barrie Kosky – Women of Troy (Sydney Theatre Company)	Best Direction of a Play	Nominated	
2009	Robyn Nevin – Women of Troy (Sydney Theatre Company)	Best Female Actor in a Play	Won	
2009	Pamela Rabe – War of the Roses (Sydney Theatre Company)	Best Female Actor in a Play	Nominated	
2009	Cate Blanchett – War of the Roses (Sydney Theatre Company)	Best Female Actor in a Play	Nominated	
2009	Robert Menzies – War of the Roses (Sydney Theatre Company)	Best Male Actor in a Play	Nominated	
2009	Marta Dusseldorp – War of the Roses (Sydney Theatre Company)	Best Female Actor in a Supporting Role in a Play	Won	
2009	Ewen Leslie – War of the Roses (Sydney Theatre Company)	Best Male Actor in a Supporting Role in a Play	Won	
2009	Robert Cousins – War of the Roses (Sydney Theatre Company)	Best Scenic Design	Nominated	
2009	Max Lyandvert – War of the Roses (Sydney Theatre Company)	Best Sound Design	Won	
2009	Nick Schlieper – War of the Roses (Sydney Theatre Company)	Best Lighting Design	Won	
2010	Kathryn Hunter – Kafka's Monkey (Arts Projects Australia in association with Sydney Theatre Company and Malthouse Theatre)	Best Female Actor in a Play	Nominated	
2010	Paul Charlier – A Streetcar Named Desire (Sydney Theatre Company)	Best Sound Design	Won	
2011	Uncle Vanya – Sydney Theatre Company (in association with Bell Shakespeare)	Best Play	Nominated	
2011	Cate Blanchett – Uncle Vanya (Sydney Theatre Company)	Best Female Actor in a Play	Nominated	
2011	Robyn Nevin – Long Day's Journey into Night (Sydney Theatre Company and Artists Repertory Theatre)	Best Female Actor in a Play	Nominated	
2011	Helen Thomson – In the Next Room (or The Vibrator Play) (Sydney Theatre Company)	Best Female Actor in a Play	Nominated	
2011	Richard Roxburgh – Uncle Vanya (Sydney Theatre Company)	Best Male Actor in a Play	Nominated	
2011	John Bell – Uncle Vanya (Sydney Theatre Company)	Best Male Actor in a Supporting Role in a Play	Nominated	
2011	Nick Schlieper – Baal (Sydney Theatre Company and Malthouse Melbourne)	Best Lighting Design	Nominated	
2012	Benedict Andrews – Gross und Klein (Big and Small) (Sydney Theatre Company)	Best Play	Nominated	
2012	Bille Brown – The Histrionic (Malthouse Theatre & Sydney Theatre Company)	Best Male Actor in a Play	Nominated	
2012	Justine Clarke – Les Liaisons dDangereuses (Sydney Theatre Company)	Best Female Actor in a Supporting Role in a Play	Nominated	
2012	Miranda Otto – The White Guard (Sydney Theatre Company)	Best Female Actor in a Supporting Role in a Play	Nominated	
2013	The Secret River (Sydney Theatre Company)	Best Play	Won	
2013	Neil Armfield – The Secret River (Sydney Theatre Company)	Best Direction of a Play	Won	
2013	Helen Thomson – Mrs. Warren's Profession (Sydney Theatre Company)	Best Female Actor in a Play	Nominated	
2013	Nathaniel Dean – The Secret River (Sydney Theatre Company)	Best Male Actor in a Play	Nominated	
2013	Valerie Bader – Australia Day (Sydney Theatre Company and Melbourne Theatre Company)	Best Female Actor in a Supporting Role in a Play	Nominated	
2013	Miranda Tapsell – The Secret River (Sydney Theatre Company)	Best Female Actor in a Supporting Role in a Play	Nominated	
2013	Colin Moody – The Secret River (Sydney Theatre Company)	Best Male Actor in a Supporting Role in a Play	Won	
2014	Waiting for Godot (Sydney Theatre Company)	Best Play	Won	
2014	Andrew Upton – Waiting for Godot (Sydney Theatre Company)	Best Direction of a Play	Nominated	
2014	Cate Blanchett – The Maids (Sydney Theatre Company)	Best Female Actor in a Play	Won	
2014	Richard Roxburgh – Waiting for Godot (Sydney Theatre Company)	Best Male Actor in a Play	Won	
2014	Paul Blackwell – Vere (Faith) (State Theatre Company of South Australia and Sydney Theatre Company)	Best Male Actor in a Play	Nominated	
2014	Elizabeth Debicki – The Maids (Sydney Theatre Company)	Best Female Actor in a Supporting Role in a Play	Nominated	
2014	Luke Mullins – Waiting for Godot (Sydney Theatre Company)	Best Male Actor in a Supporting Role in a Play	Won	
2014	Ewen Leslie – Rosencrantz and Guildenstern Are Dead (Sydney Theatre Company)	Best Male Actor in a Supporting Role in a Play	Nominated	
2014	Storm Boy – (with Barking Gecko Theatre Company)	Best Presentation for Children	Nominated	
2015	Calpurnia Descending (with Malthouse Theatre)	Best Play	Nominated	
2015	Endgame (Sydney Theatre Company)	Best Play	Nominated	
2015	Suddenly Last Summer (Sydney Theatre Company)	Best Play	Nominated	
2015	Kip Williams – Suddenly Last Summer (Sydney Theatre Company)	Best Direction of a Play	Won	
2015	Sarah Goodes – Switzerland (Sydney Theatre Company)	Best Direction of a Play	Nominated	
2015	Andrew Upton – Endgame (Sydney Theatre Company)	Best Direction of a Play	Nominated	
2015	Robyn Nevin – Suddenly Last Summer (Sydney Theatre Company)	Best Female Actor in a Play	Nominated	
2015	Sarah Peirse – Switzerland (Sydney Theatre Company)	Best Female Actor in a Play	Nominated	
2015	Hugo Weaving – Endgame (Sydney Theatre Company)	Best Male Actor in a Play	Won	
2015	Helen Thomson – After Dinner (Sydney Theatre Company)	Best Female in a Supporting Role in a Play	Won	
2015	Sarah Peirse – Endgame (Sydney Theatre Company)	Best Female in a Supporting Role in a Play	Nominated	
2015	Bruce Spence – Endgame (Sydney Theatre Company)	Best Male Actor in a Supporting Role in a Play	Nominated	
2015	Glenn Hazeldine – After Dinner (Sydney Theatre Company)	Best Male Actor in a Supporting Role in a Play	Nominated	
2015	Nick Schlieper – Macbeth (Sydney Theatre Company)	Best Lighting Design	Nominated	
2016	Kip Williams – Love and Information (Sydney Theatre Company and Malthouse Theatre)	Best Direction of a Play	Nominated	
2016	Cate Blanchett – The Present (Sydney Theatre Company)	Best Female Actor in a Play	Nominated	
2016	Sarah Peirse – The Golden Age (Sydney Theatre Company)	Best Female Actor in a Supporting Role in a Play	Won	
2016	Mark Leonard Winter – King Lear (Sydney Theatre Company)	Best Male Actor in a Supporting Role in a Play	Won	
2017	Kip Williams – Chimerica (Sydney Theatre Company)	Best Direction of a Play	Nominated	
2018	The Children – (Melbourne Theatre Company and Sydney Theatre Company)	Best Play	Won	
2018	Black is the New White (Sydney Theatre Company)	Best Play	Nominated	
2018	The Resistible Rise of Arturo Ui (Sydney Theatre Company)	Best Play	Nominated	
2018	Sarah Goodes – The Children – (Melbourne Theatre Company and Sydney Theatre Company)	Best Direction	Won	
2018	Kip Williams – Cloud Nine (Sydney Theatre Company)	Best Direction	Nominated	
2018	Kip Williams – The Resistible Rise of Arturo Ui (Sydney Theatre Company)	Best Direction	Nominated	
2018	Pamela Rabe – The Children – (Melbourne Theatre Company and Sydney Theatre Company)	Best Female Actor in a Play	Won	
2018	Sarah Peirse – The Children – (Melbourne Theatre Company and Sydney Theatre Company)	Best Female Actor in a Play	Nominated	
2018	Hugo Weaving – The Resistible Rise of Arturo Ui (Sydney Theatre Company)	Best Male Actor in a Play	Won	
2018	John Bell – The Father (Sydney Theatre Company and Melbourne Theatre Company)	Best Male Actor in a Play	Nominated	
2018	Anita Hegh – The Resistible Rise of Arturo Ui (Sydney Theatre Company)	Best Female Actor in a Supporting Role in a Play	Won	
2018	Kate Box – Top Girls (Sydney Theatre Company)	Best Female Actor in a Supporting Role in a Play	Nominated	
2018	Peter Carroll – The Resistible Rise of Arturo Ui (Sydney Theatre Company)	Best Male Actor in a Supporting Role in a Play	Nominated	
2018	Colin Moody – The Resistible Rise of Arturo Ui (Sydney Theatre Company)	Best Male Actor in a Supporting Role in a Play	Nominated	
2018	Muriel's Wedding The Musical – Sydney Theatre Company and Global Creatures	Best Musical	Nominated	
2019	Blackie Blackie Brown: The Traditional Owner of Death (with Malthouse Theatre)	Best Play	Nominated	
2019	The Harp in the South: Part One and Part Two (Sydney Theatre Company)	Best Play	Nominated	
2019	Declan Green – Blackie Blackie Brown: The Traditional Owner of Death (with Malthouse Theatre)	| Best Direction of a Play	Nominated	
2019	Imara Savage – Saint Joan (Sydney Theatre Company)	| Best Direction of a Play	Nominated	
2019	Kip Williams – The Harp in the South: Part One and Part Two (Sydney Theatre Company)	| Best Direction of a Play	Nominated	
2019	Helen Thomson – Mary Stuart (Sydney Theatre Company)	Best Female Actor in a Play	Nominated	
2019	Sarah Snook – Saint Joan (Sydney Theatre Company)	Best Female Actor in a Play	Nominated	
2019	Wayne Blair – The Long Forgotten Dream (Sydney Theatre Company)	Best Male Actor in a Play	Nominated	
2019	Helen Thomson – The Harp in the South: Part One and Part Two (Sydney Theatre Company)	Best Female Actor in a Supporting Role in a Play	Nominated	
2019	Ash Flanders – Blackie Blackie Brown: The Traditional Owner of Death (Sydney Theatre Company)	Best Male Actor in a Supporting Role in a Play	Nominated	

== See also ==
- Culture of Sydney
- Wharf Revue

== Bibliography ==
- Meyrick, Julian (2002). See How It Runs Nimrod and the New Wave. Crows Nest, N.S.W. : Allen & Unwin. ISBN 0-86819-651-7.
- Parsons, Philip; Chance, Victoria (1995). Companion to theatre in Australia. Sydney : Currency Press in association with Cambridge University Press. ISBN 0-86819-357-7.
- Wherrett, Richard (2000). The floor of heaven my life in theatre. Sydney: Hodder Headline. ISBN 0-7336-1049-8.
