= 2nd Helpmann Awards =

Australian live performance award held in 2002

- Date: 6 May 2002
- Location: Star City Show Room, Sydney
- Hosted by: Simon Burke

Television/radio coverage
- Network: No broadcast

The 2nd Helpmann Awards ceremony was presented by the Australian Entertainment Industry Association (AEIA), currently known by its trade name, Live Performance Australia (LPA), for achievements in disciplines of Australia's live performance sectors. The ceremony took place on 6 May 2002 at the Star City Show Room in Sydney and was hosted by Simon Burke for the second year in a row. During the ceremony, the AEIA handed out awards in twelve categories for achievements in theatre, musicals, opera, ballet, dance and concerts.

The ceremony received criticism for its rules and voting procedures, and was compared to the previous ceremony's "polished awards night".

== Winners and nominees ==
In the following tables, winners are listed first and highlighted in boldface.

=== Theatre ===
Best Play	Best Direction of a Play
**Cloudstreet – Company B Belvoir and Black Swan Theatre**; Master Class – International Concert Attractions; The Tempest – Melbourne Theatre Company in association with Melbourne Festival; Three Sisters – Sydney Theatre Company	**Neil Armfield – Cloudstreet**; Benedict Andrews – Three Sisters; Rodney Fisher – Master Class; Simon Phillips – The Tempest
Best Female Actor in a Play	Best Male Actor in a Play
**Amanda Muggleton – Master Class**; Essie Davis – The School for Scandal (Sydney Theatre Company); Kris McQuade – Cloudstreet; Caroline O'Connor – Bombshells (Melbourne Theatre Company)	**John Bell – Richard III (Bell Shakespeare in collaboration with Queensland Theatre Company)**; Peter Carroll – The Christian Brothers (Sydney Theatre Company); Willem Dafoe – The Hairy Ape (Melbourne Festival); John Stanton – The Tempest

=== Musicals ===
Best Musical
**Mamma Mia! – Littlestar in association with Universal and Dainty Consolidated Entertainment**; Singin' in the Rain – David Atkins Enterprises / IMG; Sweeney Todd: The Demon Barber of Fleet Street – Opera Australia; The Wizard of Oz – SEL / GFO / Macks Entertainment
Best Direction of a Musical	Best Choreography in a Musical
**Gale Edwards – Sweeney Todd: The Demon Barber of Fleet Street**; David Atkins – Singin' in the Rain; Phyllida Lloyd – Mamma Mia!; Graeme Murphy – Tivoli (The Australian Ballet & Sydney Dance Company)	**David Atkins – Singin' in the Rain**; Tony Bartuccio – The Pirates of Penzance (Essgee Entertainment); Kim Gavin – Oh! What a Night (Majestic Theatre Company); Anthony Van Laast – Mamma Mia!
Best Female Actor in a Musical	Best Male Actor in a Musical
**Judi Connelli – Sweeney Todd: The Demon Barber of Fleet Street**; Deborah Conway – Always ... Patsy Cline (Majestic Theatre Company); Lara Mulcahy – Mamma Mia!; Pamela Rabe – The Wizard of Oz	**Peter Coleman-Wright – Sweeney Todd: The Demon Barber of Fleet Street**; Martin Crewes – Oh! What a Night; Robert Grubb – Mamma Mia!; Wayne Scott Kermond – Singin' in the Rain

=== Opera ===
Best Opera	Best Direction of an Opera
**Batavia – Opera Australia in association with Melbourne Festival**; L'elisir d'amore – Opera Australia; Parsifal – State Opera of South Australia; The Fiery Angel (The Kirov Opera) – Melbourne Festival	**Lindy Hume – Batavia**; Stephen Medcalf – Going Into Shadows (Queensland Performing Arts Centre / Queensland Conservatorium / Guildhall School of Music & Drama); Elke Neidhardt – Parsifal; Simon Phillips – L'elisir d'amore
Best Female Performer in an Opera	Best Male Performer in an Opera
**Lisa Gasteen – Tristan und Isolde (Opera Australia)**; Kate Ladner – The Marriage of Figaro (West Australian Opera); Margaret Medlyn – Parsifal; Elizabeth Whitehouse – Andrea Chénier (Opera Australia)	**Jonathan Summers – Parsifal**; Bruce Martin – Batavia; Glenn Winslade – Lohengrin (Opera Australia); Angus Wood – The Gypsy Princess (Opera Australia)

=== Dance and Physical Theatre ===
Best Ballet or Dance Work	Best Visual or Physical Theatre Production
**Requiem – The Australian Ballet and State Opera of South Australia**; Corroboree – Bangarra Dance Theatre; Eidos:Telos (Ballett Frankfurt) – Melbourne Festival; Tivoli – The Australian Ballet and Sydney Dance Company	**Same, Same But Different – Performing Lines in association with Sydney Festival**; Circus Oz (Sydney season) – Circus Oz; Puppetry of the Penis – Ross Mollison Productions; Stringraphy Ensemble – Melbourne Festival in association with Victorian Arts Centre
Best Choreography in a Ballet or Dance Work
**Stephen Page – Corroboree**; Stephen Baynes – Requiem; William Forsythe – Eidos:Telos; François Klaus – Don Quixote (Queensland Ballet)
Best Female Dancer in a Dance or Physical Theatre Work	Best Male Dancer in a Dance or Physical Theatre Work
**Kate Champion – About Face (Performing Lines)**; Tracey Carrodus – Tivoli; Miranda Coney – Requiem; Sheree da Costa – Singin' in the Rain	**Steven Heathcote – Giselle (The Australian Ballet)**; Daryl Brandwood – Beyond Tears (West Australian Ballet); Joshua Horner – Tivoli; David McAllister – Giselle

=== Other ===
Best Live Music Presentation	Best Presentation for Children
**Capsis vs Capsis – Sydney Opera House**; Mahler Symphony No. 8 – Melbourne Symphony Orchestra; Testimony – Sydney Opera House and Sydney Festival in association with Melbourne Festival; Tim Draxl in Concert – Spirit Entertainment	**Hi-5 Alive – International Concert Attractions, Kids Like Us and Channel 9**; Mad, Bad and Spooky – Sydney Festival and Theatre of Image; Mice – A Cheesy Little Musical – Barking Gecko Theatre Company; The Sign of the Seahorse – Playbox and Melbourne Symphony Orchestra
Best Special Event or Performance
**Buena Vista Social Club - Inaugural Steps of Sydney Opera House paid performance – International Concert Attractions in association with Hocking & Vigo and Sydney Opera House**; Carmen (12 September [2000] Performance, New York City) – International Concert Attractions and Hocking & Vigo; The Alfred Deakin Lectures – Melbourne Festival; The Celestial Bells (Transe Express) – Sydney Festival

=== Industry ===
Best New Australian Work
**Batavia – Richard Mills & Peter Goldsworthy**; A Man with Five Children – Nick Enright (Sydney Theatre Company); Corroboree – Stephen Page; Mavis Goes to Timor – Angela Chaplin, Katherine Thomson & Kavisha Mazzella (Deckchair Theatre)
Best Original Score	Best Musical Direction
**Iain Grandage – Cloudstreet**; David Chisholm – The Shrinking Ledge (Wecreate); Ian McDonald – The Tempest; Richard Mills – Batavia	**Simone Young – Andrea Chénier**; Robert Gavin – Always ... Patsy Cline; Jeffrey Tate – Parsifal; Simone Young – Tristan und Isolde
Best Scenic Design	Best Costume Design
**Peter England – Sweeney Todd: The Demon Barber of Fleet Street**; Michael Anania and Eamon D'Arcy – Singin' in the Rain; Dale Ferguson – The Seagull (Melbourne Theatre Company); Michael Scott-Mitchell – L'elisir d'amore	**Kristian Fredrikson – The School for Scandal**; Roger Kirk – The Gypsy Princess; Paula Ryan – Singin' in the Rain; Gabriela Tylesova – L'elisir d'amore
Best Lighting Design	Best Sound Design
**Mark Howett – Cloudstreet**; Nigel Levings – The Old Masters (Sydney Theatre Company); John Rayment – Up for Grabs (Sydney Theatre Company); Nick Schlieper – Parsifal	**The Wooster Group – The Hairy Ape**; Max Lyandvert – Three Sisters; Wyn Milsom and Michael Waters – Singin' in the Rain; David Page and Steve Francis – Corroboree

=== Lifetime Achievement ===
JC Williamson Award
- **Kevin Jacobsen OAM**
- **Graeme Murphy AM**
