= Helpmann Award for Best Opera =

Classical music award

- Country: Australia
- Presented by: Live Performance Australia
- First award: 2001
- Currently held by: The Magic Flute (2019)
- Website: www.helpmannawards.com.au

The Helpmann Award for Best Opera is an award presented by Live Performance Australia (LPA), the "peak body for Australia’s live entertainment and performing arts industry". It has been handed out since 2001 at the annual Helpmann Awards, which "recognise distinguished artistic achievement and excellence in the many disciplines of Australia's vibrant live performance sectors". The award is presented to the producer of an opera, that is first performed in Australia during the eligibility period.

== Winners and nominees ==
Winners are listed first and marked in a separate colour, in boldface.

Year	Title	Production company(ies)
**2001** (1st)
**2001** (1st)	**The Eighth Wonder**	**Opera Australia**
**2001** (1st)	Così fan tutte	Opera Queensland
**2001** (1st)	Wozzeck	Opera Australia
**2001** (1st)	Writing to Vermeer	Adelaide Festival Corporation
**2002** (2nd)
**2002** (2nd)	**Batavia**	**Opera Australia** and **Melbourne Festival**
**2002** (2nd)	L'elisir d'amore	Opera Australia
**2002** (2nd)	Parsifal	State Opera of South Australia
**2002** (2nd)	The Fiery Angel (The Kirov Opera)	Melbourne Festival
**2003** (3rd)
**2003** (3rd)	**Lady Macbeth of the Mtsensk District**	**Opera Australia**
**2003** (3rd)	Love in the Age of Therapy	Sydney Festival and Oz Opera in association with Melbourne Festival and Victorian Arts Centre Trust
**2003** (3rd)	The Marriage of Figaro	Opera Australia
**2003** (3rd)	Il trovatore	West Australian Opera, State Opera of South Australia and Opera Queensland
**2004** (4th)
**2004** (4th)	**Dead Man Walking**	**State Opera of South Australia**
**2004** (4th)	Otello	Opera Australia
**2005** (5th)
**2005** (5th)	**The Ring Cycle**	**State Opera of South Australia**
**2005** (5th)	The Love for Three Oranges	Opera Australia
**2005** (5th)	Madeline Lee	Opera Australia
**2005** (5th)	Der Rosenkavalier	Opera Australia
**2006** (6th)
**2006** (6th)	**Flight**	**Adelaide Festival of Arts**, **Glyndebourne Festival Opera** and **State Opera of South Australia**
**2006** (6th)	La bohème	The Opera Conference
**2006** (6th)	The Magic Flute	State Theatre Company of South Australia
**2006** (6th)	Romeo and Juliet	Opera Australia
**2007** (7th)
**2007** (7th)	**Rusalka**	**Opera Australia**
**2007** (7th)	Alcina	Opera Australia
**2007** (7th)	Satyagraha	State Opera of South Australia, Leigh Warren & Dancers and The Adelaide Vocal Project
**2007** (7th)	The Love of the Nightingale	West Australian Opera, UWA Perth International Arts Festival, Opera Queensland and Queensland Music Festival
**2008** (8th)
**2008** (8th)	**Arabella**	**Opera Australia**
**2008** (8th)	Les contes d'Hoffmann	Opera Australia
**2008** (8th)	Dead Man Walking	Andrew McManus Presents and Alexander Productions
**2008** (8th)	Little Women	State Opera of South Australia and State Theatre Company of South Australia
**2009** (9th)
**2009** (9th)	**Billy Budd**	**Opera Australia**
**2009** (9th)	The Coronation of Poppea	Victorian Opera
**2009** (9th)	The Navigator	Brisbane Festival 2008 and Melbourne International Arts Festival
**2009** (9th)	Aida	West Australian Opera
**2010** (10th)
**2010** (10th)	**Peter Grimes**	**Opera Australia**
**2010** (10th)	Bliss	Opera Australia
**2010** (10th)	Le Grand Macabre	Adelaide Festival in association with State Opera of South Australia
**2010** (10th)	King Lear	10 Days on the Island
**2011** (11th)
**2011** (11th)	**Partenope**	**Opera Australia**
**2011** (11th)	La fanciulla del West	Opera Australia
**2011** (11th)	The Threepenny Opera	Malthouse Theatre and Victorian Opera
**2011** (11th)	María de Buenos Aires	State Opera of South Australia and Leigh Warren & Dancers
**2012** (12th)
**2012** (12th)	**Moby-Dick**	**State Opera of South Australia**
**2012** (12th)	The Barbarians	MONA FOMA and IHOS Opera
**2012** (12th)	The Rake's Progress	Victorian Opera
**2012** (12th)	Elektra	West Australian Opera, ThinIce, Perth International Arts Festival and Opera Australia
**2013** (13th)
**2013** (13th)	**Salome**	**Opera Australia**
**2013** (13th)	L'isola disabitata	Hobart Baroque and Royal Opera House
**2013** (13th)	Die tote Stadt	Opera Australia
**2013** (13th)	Un ballo in maschera	Opera Australia
**2014** (14th)
**2014** (14th)	**Melbourne Ring Cycle**	**Opera Australia**
**2014** (14th)	La Traviata	State Opera of South Australia, New Zealand Opera, Opera Queensland
**2014** (14th)	Nixon in China	Victorian Opera
**2014** (14th)	The Turk in Italy	Opera Australia
**2015** (15th)
**2015** (15th)	**Faramondo**	**Brisbane Baroque in association with QPAC**
**2015** (15th)	Faust	Opera Australia in association with The Opera Conference
**2015** (15th)	Madama Butterfly	English National Opera, Metropolitan Opera and Lithuanian National Opera in association with West Australian Opera and Perth International Arts Festival
**2015** (15th)	Philip Glass Trilogy	State Opera of South Australia
**2016** (16th)
**2016** (16th)	**Agrippina**	**Brisbane Baroque in association with QPAC**
**2016** (16th)	Fly Away Peter	Arts Centre Melbourne and Sydney Chamber Opera in association with Melbourne Festival
**2016** (16th)	Luisa Miller	Opera Australia
**2016** (16th)	The Marriage of Figaro	Opera Australia
**2017** (17th)
**2017** (17th)	**Saul**	**Glyndebourne Festival Opera and Adelaide Festival in association with the State Opera of South Australia, the Adelaide Symphony Orchestra and the Adelaide Festival Centre**
**2017** (17th)	Cavalleria Rusticana & I Pagliacci	Opera Australia
**2017** (17th)	Così fan tutte	Opera Australia
**2017** (17th)	King Roger	Opera Australia
**2018** (18th)
**2018** (18th)	**Hamlet**	**Glyndebourne Festival, Adelaide Festival, State Opera of South Australia and the Adelaide Symphony Orchestra**
**2018** (18th)	The Nose	Opera Australia
**2018** (18th)	Cunning Little Vixen	Victorian Opera
**2018** (18th)	Black Rider: The Casting of the Magic Bullets	Malthouse Theatre and Victorian Opera
**2019** (19th)
**2019** (19th)	**Komische Oper Berlin's The Magic Flute**	**Arts Projects Australia, Adelaide Festival and Perth Festival**
**2019** (19th)	Wozzeck	Opera Australia
**2019** (19th)	Metamorphosis	Opera Australia
**2019** (19th)	Artaserse	Pinchgut Opera

== See also ==
- Helpmann Awards
