= 3rd Helpmann Awards =

Australian live performance awards held in 2003

- Date: 19 May 2003
- Location: Star City Show Room, Sydney
- Hosted by: Simon Burke

The 3rd Helpmann Awards ceremony was presented by the Australian Entertainment Industry Association (AEIA) (currently known by its trade name, Live Performance Australia (LPA)), for achievements in disciplines of Australia's live performance sectors. The ceremony took place on 19 May 2003 at the Star City Show Room. During the ceremony, the AEIA handed out awards in 35 categories for achievements in theatre, musicals, opera, ballet, dance and concerts.

== Winners and nominees ==
In the following tables, winners are listed first and highlighted in boldface.

=== Theatre ===
Best Play	Best Direction of a Play
**Copenhagen – Sydney Theatre Company**; The Comedy of Errors – The Bell Shakespeare Company; Soft – Back to Back and Melbourne Festival; Waiting for Godot – Company B Belvoir and Sydney Festival	**Michael Blakemore – Copenhagen**; Neil Armfield – Waiting for Godot; Simon Phillips – The Blue Room (Melbourne Theatre Company); Simon Phillips – Great Expectations (Melbourne Theatre Company)
Best Female Actor in a Play	Best Male Actor in a Play
**Rachel Griffiths – Proof (Melbourne Theatre Company)**; Deborah Mailman – Seven Stages of Grieving (Sydney Theatre Company); Miranda Otto – A Doll's House (Sydney Theatre Company); Sigrid Thornton – The Blue Room	**Colin Friels – Copenhagen**; Max Cullen – Waiting for Godot; Marcus Graham – The Blue Room; Benjamin Winspear – Great Expectations
Best Female Actor in a Supporting Role in a Play	Best Male Actor in a Supporting Role in a Play
**Jane Harders – Copenhagen**; Julie Forsyth – Great Expectations; Deborah Kennedy – Soulmates (Sydney Theatre Company); Angela Punch McGregor – Great Expectations	**Peter Carroll – Endgame (Sydney Theatre Company)**; Paul English – Rapture (Playbox Theatre); Christopher Gabardi – Cloud Nine (Melbourne Theatre Company); Jean-Marc Russ – The Messiah (Queensland Theatre Company)

=== Musicals ===
Best Musical
**Cabaret – IMG and Barry & Fran Weissler**; Man of La Mancha – SEL & GFO; Oliver! – Cameron Mackintosh and IMG; The Witches of Eastwick– Jacobsen Entertainment
Best Direction of a Musical	Best Choreography in a Musical
**B.T McNicholl, Sam Mendes and Rob Marshall – Cabaret**; Graham Gill and Sam Mendes – Oliver!; James Powell – The Witches of Eastwick; Nadia Tass – The Lion, the Witch, and the Wardrobe (Malcolm C. Cooke & Associates)	**Cynthia Onrubia and Rob Marshall – Cabaret**; Kelly Abbey – Footloose (SEL & GFO); Geoff Garratt and Matthew Bourne – Oliver!; Stephen Mear and Bob Avian – The Witches of Eastwick
Best Female Actor in a Musical	Best Male Actor in a Musical
**Tamsin Carroll – Oliver!**; Lisa McCune – Cabaret; Caroline O'Connor – Man of La Mancha; Marina Prior – The Witches of Eastwick	**Toby Allen – Cabaret**; Paul McDermott – The Witches of Eastwick; Anthony Warlow – Man of La Mancha; John Waters – Oliver!
Best Female Actor in a Supporting Role in a Musical	Best Male Actor in a Supporting Role in a Musical
**Nadine Garner – Cabaret**; Judi Connelli – Cabaret; Geraldine Turner – The Witches of Eastwick; Queenie van de Zandt – Oliver!	**Henri Szeps – Cabaret**; Philip Dodd – Oliver!; Simon Gleeson – Mamma Mia! (Judy Craymer, Richard East and Bjorn Ulvaeus in association with Universal and Dainty Consolidated Entertainment); Tony Sheldon – The Witches of Eastwick

=== Opera ===
Best Opera	Best Direction of an Opera
**Lady Macbeth of Mtsensk – Opera Australia**; Il Trovatore – West Australian Opera, State Opera of South Australia & Opera Queensland; Love in the Age of Therapy – OZOpera, Victorian Arts Centre Trust, Melbourne Festival & Sydney Festival; The Marriage of Figaro – Opera Australia	**Neil Armfield – The Marriage of Figaro**; Elke Niedhardt – Il Trovatore; Patrick Nolan – Love in the Age of Therapy; Francesca Zambello – Lady Macbeth of Mtsensk
Best Female Performer in an Opera	Best Male Performer in an Opera
**Elizabeth Whitehouse – Lady Macbeth of Mtsensk**; Elizabeth Campbell – Il Trovatore; Joanna Cole – Lindy (Opera Australia); Elizabeth Connell – Ariadne auf Naxos (Opera Australia)	**Peter Rose – Der Rosenkavalier (Opera Australia)**; Julian Gavin – Andrea Chenier (Opera Queensland and The Opera Conference); Michael Lewis – Il Trovatore; Glen Winsdale – Lohengrin (Opera Australia)
Best Female Performer in a Supporting Role in an Opera	Best Male Performer in a Supporting Role in an Opera
**Lisa Harper-Brown – The Marriage of Figaro**; Natalie Jones – Ariadne auf Naxos; Helen Noonan – Motherland (Chamber Made and Melbourne Festival); Elisa Wilson – La Boheme (West Australian Opera)	**Jonathan Summers – Cavalleria Rusticana/Pagliacci (Opera Australia)**; Jan-Hendrik Rootering – Der Frieschutz (Opera Australia); Andrew Schroeder – La Boheme

=== Dance and Physical Theatre ===
Best Ballet or Dance Work	Best Visual or Physical Theatre Production
**Swan Lake – The Australian Ballet**; The Age of Unbeauty – Australian Dance Theatre; Ellipse – Sydney Dance Company; Walkabout – Bangarra Dance Theatre	**Twinkle Twinkle Little Fish – Windmill Performing Arts**; Circus Oz 2003 Season – Circus Oz; Still Angela – Playbox Theatre; Macbeth: As Told by the Weird Sisters – Zen Zen Zo
Best Choreography in a Ballet or Dance Work
**Graeme Murphy – Swan Lake**; Stephen Page and Steven McTaggart – Walkabout - 'Rush'; Garry Stewart – The Age of Unbeauty; Frances Rings – Walkabout - 'Rations'
Best Female Dancer in a Ballet or Dance Work	Best Male Dancer in a Ballet or Dance Work
**Simone Goldsmith – Swan Lake**; Wakako Asano – Ellipse; Jayne Cooper – Black Cake From United! (West Australian Ballet); Kimberley Davis – The Big 3 (Queensland Ballet)	**Russell Page – Walkabout**; Bradley Chatfield – Ellipse; Steven Heathcote – Swan Lake; Steven Heathcote – Totem (The Australian Ballet)

=== Other ===
Best Classical Concert Presentation	Best Contemporary Music Presentation
**The Soldier's Tale – Australian Chamber Orchestra and The Bell Shakespeare Company**; The Kancheli Festival – Melbourne Symphony Orchestra; La Pasion Segun San Marcos– Sydney Festival; Turangalila - Symphonie – Melbourne Festival and Melbourne Symphony	**Soweto Gospel Choir – International Concert Attractions and Hocking & Vigo**; Fiddler's Bid – Melbourne Festival and national partners; George and Special Guest Jon Lord with the Sydney Symphony – Sydney Festival and Sydney Opera House in association with Sydney Symphony; Women in Voice 11 – Queensland Performing Arts Centre, Folk Federation & Annie Peterson
Best Presentation for Children	Best Special Event or Performance
**Twinkle, Twinkle, Little Fish – Windmill Performing Arts**; Aesop and His Fables – Barking Gecko Theatre Company; The Lion, the Witch and the Wardrobe – Malcolm C. Cooke & Associates; Out of the Blue – Spare Parts Puppet Theatre	**Celebrating Samuel Beckett – Sydney Festival**; Long Way to the Top – Michael Chugg Entertainment, Jacobsen Entertainment and Jack Utsick; The Man From Snowy River – Jacobsen Entertainment and David Atkins Enterprises; My Life, My Love – State Theatre Company of South Australia and Tutti Ensemble in association with the Adelaide Festival

=== Industry ===
Best New Australian Work
**Walkabout – Bangarra Dance Theatre**; Bill and Mary – Queensland Theatre Company; Love in the Age of Therapy; Oboe Concerto for Diana Doherty – Sydney Symphony
Best Original Score	Best Musical Direction
**Steve Francis** – **Walkabout**; Paul Grabowsky and Joanna Murray-Smith – Love in the Age of Therapy; Andree Greenwell – Volpone (Sydney Theatre Company); Ian McDonald – Great Expectations	**Richard Hickox – Lady Macbeth of Mtsensk**; Julia de Plater – Love in the Age of Therapy; Richard Gill – Lindy; Michael Tyack and Julain Bigg – The Witches of Eastwick
Best Costume Design	Best Scenic Design
**Julie Lynch** – **The Way of the World (Sydney Theatre Company)**; Bob Crowley – The Witches of Eastwick; Dale Ferguson – Great Expectations; Kristian Fredrikson – Man of La Mancha	**Kristian Fredrikson – Swan Lake**; Stephen Curtis – The Blue Room; Dan Potra – Love in the Age of Therapy; Tony Tripp – A Doll's House
Best Lighting Design	Best Sound Design
**Matt Scott – The Blue Room**; David Hersey and Jenny Kagan – Oliver!; Nigel Levings – Copenhagen; Nick Schlieper – Great Expectations	**John Scandrett and Julian Spink – Cabaret**; Paul Charlier – Buried Child (Company B Belvoir); Peter Grubb – The Witches of Eastwick; Peter Grubb and Shelley Lee – Oliver!

=== Lifetime Achievement ===
JC Williamson Award
- **Wendy Blacklock AM**
- **John Robertson OAM**
