= Helpmann Award for Best Direction of an Opera =

Annual Australian opera award

Helpmann Award Best Direction of an Opera
- Country: Australia
- Presented by: Live Performance Australia (LPA)
- First award: 2001
- Website: Official website

The Helpmann Award for Best Direction of an Opera is an award presented by Live Performance Australia (LPA), an employers' organisation which serves as the peak body in the live entertainment and performing arts industries in Australia. The accolade is handed out at the annual Helpmann Awards, which celebrates achievements in musical theatre, contemporary music, comedy, opera, classical music, theatre, dance and physical theatre.

The award is given to the "director who has made a material contribution to the Australian aspect of the production." The nominees are determined by the Opera and Classical Music branch of the Helpmann Awards Nominating Panel; winners are chosen by all branches of the Nominating Panel, and other eligible voters.

== Winners and nominees ==
Winners are listed first and marked in a separate colour, in boldface.

Year	Director	Production
**2001** (1st)	**Neil Armfield**	**The Eighth Wonder**
2001 (1st)	Lindy Hume	Orlando
2001 (1st)	Barrie Kosky	Wozzeck
2001 (1st)	Moffatt Oxenbould	Simon Boccanegra
**2002** (2nd)	**Lindy Hume**	**Batavia**
2002 (2nd)	Stephen Medcalf	Going Into Shadows
2002 (2nd)	Elke Neidhardt	Parsifal
2002 (2nd)	Simon Phillips	L'elisir d'amore
**2003** (3rd)	**Neil Armfield**	**The Marriage of Figaro**
2003 (3rd)	Elke Neidhardt	Il Trovatore
2003 (3rd)	Patrick Nolan	Love in the Age of Therapy
2003 (3rd)	Francesca Zambello	Lady Macbeth of the Mtsensk District
**2004** (4th)	**Joe Mantello, Brad Dalton**^{[A]}	**Dead Man Walking**
2004 (4th)	Nigel Jamieson	Brundibár
2004 (4th)	Harry Kupfer	Otello
2004 (4th)	Simon Phillips	Lulu
**2005** (5th)	**Elke Neidhardt**	**Der Ring des Nibelungen** (The Ring Cycle)
2005 (5th)	Stuart Maunder	Manon
2005 (5th)	Patrick Nolan	Il combattimento di Tancredi e Clorinda
2005 (5th)	Francesca Zambello	The Love for Three Oranges
**2006** (6th)	**John Cox**	**The Rake's Progress**
2006 (6th)	Simon Phillips	La Bohème
2006 (6th)	Rachel McDonald	La voix humaine
2006 (6th)	David Freeman	Nabucco
**2007** (7th)	**Douglas Horton**	**The Hive**
2007 (7th)	Olivia Fuchs	Rusalka
2007 (7th)	Lindy Hume	The Love of the Nightingale
2007 (7th)	Leigh Warren	Satyagraha
**2008** (8th)	**John Cox**	**Arabella**
2008 (8th)	Bruce Beresford	A Streetcar Named Desire
2008 (8th)	Adam Cook	Little Women
2008 (8th)	Nigel Jamieson	Dead Man Walking
**2009** (9th)	**Neil Armfield**	**Billy Budd**
2009 (9th)	Kate Cherry	L'incoronazione di Poppea (The Coronation of Poppaea)
2009 (9th)	Chris Kohn	The Children's Bach
2009 (9th)	Graeme Murphy	Aida
**2010** (10th)	**Neil Armfield**	**Peter Grimes**
2010 (10th)	Neil Armfield	Bliss
2010 (10th)	Chris Drummond	The Flying Dutchman
2010 (10th)	Alex Olle and Valentina Carrasco	Le Grand Macabre
**2011** (11th)	**Nigel Jamieson**	**La Fanciulla del West**
2011 (11th)	Christopher Alden	Partenope
2011 (11th)	Michael Kantor	Threepenny Opera
2011 (11th)	Leigh Warren	Maria De Buenos Aires
**2012** (12th)	**Leonard Foglia**	**Moby-Dick**
2012 (12th)	Bruce Beresford	Of Mice and Men
2012 (12th)	Matthew Lutton	Elektra
2012 (12th)	Francesca Zambello	La Traviata
**2013** (13th)	**Àlex Ollé**	**Un ballo in maschera**
2013 (13th)	Rodula Gaitanou	L'isola disabitata
2013 (13th)	Gale Edwards	Salome
2013 (13th)	Ludger Engels	Semele Walk
**2014** (14th)	**Neil Armfield**	**Melbourne Ring Cycle**
2014 (14th)	Chas Rader-Shieber	Orlando
2014 (14th)	Simon Phillips	The Turk in Italy
2014 (14th)	Roger Hodgman	Nixon in China
**2015** (15th)	**Paul Curran**	**Faramondo**
2015 (15th)	David McVicar	Don Giovanni
2015 (15th)	David McVicar	Faust
2015 (15th)	Leigh Warren	The Philip Glass Trilogy
**2016** (16th)	**David McVicar**	**The Marriage of Figaro**
2016 (16th)	Michael Gow	Voyages to the Moon
2016 (16th)	Cameron Menzies	The Grumpiest Boy in the World
2016 (16th)	Laurence Dale	Agrippina
**2017** (17th)	**Barrie Kosky**	**Saul**
2017 (17th)	David McVicar	Cosi fan tutte
2017 (17th)	Damiano Michieletto	Cavalleria Rusticana & I Pagliacci
2017 (17th)	Gale Edwards	Cloudstreet
**2018** (18th)	**Neil Armfield**	**Hamlet**
2018 (18th)	Barrie Kosky	The Nose
2018 (18th)	Stuart Maunder	The Cunning Little Vixen
2018 (18th)	Matthew Lutton	Black Rider: The Casting of the Magic Bullets
**2019** (19th)	**Barrie Kosky and Suzanne Andrade**	**The Magic Flute**
2019 (19th)	William Kentridge	Wozzeck
2019 (19th)	Lindy Hume	Don Giovanni
2019 (19th)	Sarah Giles	Lorelei

== Notes ==
A: The win for Dead Man Walking was for Joe Mantello, credited for "production", and Brad Dalton who oversaw the rehearsal and direction of the opera in Australia.

== See also ==
- Helpmann Awards
