= Inheritance (play) =

Play by Hannie Rayson

Inheritance is a two act play by Australian playwright Hannie Rayson. It is a family saga set in Victoria's Mallee region.

The original Melbourne Theatre Company (MTC) production opened at the Playhouse, Arts Centre Melbourne in March 2003, before moving the following month to the Sydney Opera House's Drama Theatre for the Sydney Theatre Company. Directed by Simon Phillips, the cast included Ronald Falk, Geraldine Turner, Steve Bisley, Julie Nihill, Wayne Blair, Gareth Ellis, Nick Farnell, Katherine Fyffe, Jody Kennedy, Lois Ramsey, Monica Maughan and Rhys McConnochie.

At the 2004 Helpmann Awards, Inheritance was named Best New Australian Work, and the MTC's production Best Play.
