= 6th Helpmann Awards =

Australian live performance awards held in 2006

- Date: 31 July 2006
- Location: Lyric Theatre, Sydney
- Hosted by: Simon Burke

Television/radio coverage
- Network: Fox8

The 6th Annual Helpmann Awards for live performance in Australia were held on 31 July 2006 at the Lyric Theatre in Sydney.

== Winners and nominees ==
In the following tables, winners are listed first and highlighted in boldface. The nominees are listed below the winner and not in boldface.

=== Theatre ===
Best Play	Best Direction of a Play
**Stuff Happens – Company B presented by Company B and Newtheatricals in association with Lunchbox Theatricals**; Away – Queensland Theatre Company; Edward Albee's The Goat, or Who is Sylvia? – State Theatre Company of South Australia; Le Dernier Caravanserail – Melbourne International Arts Festival and Theatre du Soleil	**Marion Potts – Edward Albee's The Goat, or Who is Sylvia?**; Declan Donnellan – Twelfth Night (Chekhov International Festival in co-operation with Cheek by Jowl presented by Sydney Festival); Ariane Mnouchkine – Le Dernier Caravanserail; Simon Phillips – King Lear (Melbourne Theatre Company)
Best Female Actor in a Play	Best Male Actor in a Play
**Caroline O'Connor – End of the Rainbow (Ensemble Productions)**; Jennifer Flowers – Doubt (Sydney Theatre Company); Victoria Longley – Edward Albee's The Goat, or Who is Sylvia?; Leah Purcell – Stuff Happens	**Greg Stone – Stuff Happens**; Stephen Dillane – Macbeth (Arts Projects Australia and Adelaide Festival of Arts); Marcus Graham – Oedipus the King (Queensland Theatre Company); Robert Menzies – Julius Caesar (Sydney Theatre Company)
Best Female Actor in a Supporting Role in a Play	Best Male Actor in a Supporting Role in a Play
**Alison Bell – Doubt**; Michaela Cantwell – Honk If You Are Jesus (State Theatre Company of South Australia); Anne Looby – The Peach Season (Griffin Theatre Company); Belinda McClory – The Odyssey (Malthouse Theatre, Melbourne International Arts Festival, Black Swan Theatre Company and the Perth International Arts Festival)	**Russell Dykstra – Stuff Happens**; Cameron Goodall – Edward Albee's The Goat, or Who is Sylvia?; Hamish Michael – Two Brothers (Melbourne Theatre Company & Sydney Theatre Company); Frank Whitten – Julius Caesar

=== Musicals ===
Best Musical
**The 25th Annual Putnam County Spelling Bee – Melbourne Theatre Company**; Dusty: The Original Pop Diva – Dusty Productions; Fiddler of the Roof – TML Enterprises; Menopause the Musical – McPherson Ink
Best Direction of a Musical	Best Choreography in a Musical
**Simon Phillips – The 25th Annual Putnam County Spelling Bee**; Stuart Maunder – Dusty: The Original Pop Diva; Robyn Nevin – Summer Rain (Sydney Theatre Company); Gary Young – Menopause the Musical	**Ross Coleman – Dusty: The Original Pop Diva**; Ross Coleman – The 25th Annual Putnam County Spelling Bee; Andrew Hallsworth – Leader of the Pack (Crown and Leader Entertainment with newtheatricals); Andrew Hallsworth – Menopause the Musical
Best Female Actor in a Musical	Best Male Actor in a Musical
**Tamsin Carroll – Dusty: The Original Pop Diva**; Amanda Harrison – Leader of the Pack; Marina Prior – The 25th Annual Putnam County Spelling Bee; Magda Szubanski – The 25th Annual Putnam County Spelling Bee	**David Campbell – Sunset Boulevard (The Production Company)**; David Campbell – The 25th Annual Putnam County Spelling Bee; Ian Stenlake – Oklahoma! (The Production Company); Topol – Fiddler on the Roof
Best Female Actor in a Supporting Role in a Musical	Best Male Actor in a Supporting Role in a Musical
**Christen O'Leary – The 25th Annual Putnam County Spelling Bee**; Alexis Fishman – Dusty: The Original Pop Diva; Jodie Gillies – Summer Rain; Deni Hines – Dusty: The Original Pop Diva	**Tyler Coppin – The 25th Annual Putnam County Spelling Bee**; Mitchell Butel – Summer Rain; Barry Crocker AM – Fiddler on the Roof; Bert LaBonte – The 25th Annual Putnam County Spelling Bee

=== Opera and Classical Music ===
Best Opera	Best Direction of an Opera
**Flight** **– Adelaide Festival of Arts, Glyndebourne Festival Opera and State Opera of South Australia**; La Boheme – Opera Australia; The Magic Flute – Opera Australia; Romeo & Juliet – Opera Australia	**John Cox – The Rake's Progress (Opera Australia)**; David Freeman – Nabucco (Opera Australia); Rachel McDonald – La Voix Humaine (Opera Australia); Simon Phillips – La Boheme
Best Female Performer in an Opera	Best Male Performer in an Opera
**Emma Matthews – Lakmé (Opera Australia)**; Elizabeth Connell – Nabucco; Rachelle Durkin – Rinaldo (Opera Australia); Emma Matthews – Romeo & Juliet	**Philip Langridge – Death in Venice (Opera Australia)**; Teddy Tahu Rhodes – Don Giovanni (Opera Australia); David Walker – Flight
Best Female Performer in a Supporting Role in an Opera	Best Male Performer in a Supporting Role in an Opera
**Catherine Carby – The Rake's Progress**; Amelia Farrugia – La Boheme; Natalie Jones – La Boheme; Nicole Youl – Carmen (West Australian Opera)	**Peter Coleman-Wright – Death in Venice**; Joshua Bloom – The Rake's Progress; Warwick Fyfe – The Magic Flute; Graham Pushee – Rinaldo
Best Classical Concert Presentation	Best Performance in a Classical Concert
**Tristan und Isolde – Queensland Music Festival and the Australian Youth Orchestra**; Brodsky Quartet – Sydney Festival; Candide – Perth International Arts Festival; Opera in Concert, Verdi's Otello – MSO	**Lisa Gasteen – Tristan und Isolde (Queensland Music Festival and Australian Youth Orchestra)**; Diana Doherty – Bohemia Concert - Bohuslav Martinu - Concerto for oboe and small orchestra (Sydney Symphony); Rachelle Durkin – Candide (Perth International Arts Festival); Maestro Oleg Caetani – Opera in Concert, Verdi's Otello (MSO)

=== Dance and Physical Theatre ===
Best Ballet or Dance Work	Best Visual or Physical Theatre Production
**Jiri – The Australian Ballet**; A Midsummer Night's Dream – West Australian Ballet; An Evening of Works by Russell Maliphant – George Piper Dances presented by Sydney Festival; I Want to Dance Better at Parties – Chunky Move presented by Sydney Festival	**On the Case – Legs on the Wall**; Bright Abyss – La Compagnie du Hanneton presented by Sydney Festival; PreTender – Buzz Dance Theatre
Best Choreography in a Dance or Physical Theatre Work
**Debra Batton and Mark Murphy – On the Case**; Felicity Bott – PreTender; Russell Maliphant – An Evening of Works by Russell Maliphant; Chrissie Parrott – A Midsummer Night's Dream
Best Female Dancer in a Dance or Physical Theatre Work	Best Male Dancer in a Dance or Physical Theatre Work
**Lana Jones – JIRI (Forgotten Land) (The Australian Ballet)**; Rachel Rawlins – JIRI (Forgotten Land, Petite Mort); Leanne Mason – Rabbit (Buzz Dance Theatre); Danielle Rowe – The Sleeping Beauty (The Australian Ballet)	**Daryl Brandwood – A Midsummer Night's Dream**; Michael Nunn – An Evening of Works by Russell Maliphant; Remi Wortmeyer – JIRI (Forgotten Land); Paul Blackman – PreTender

=== Contemporary Music ===
Best Australian Contemporary Concert	Best Performance in an Australian Contemporary Concert
**Boulevard Delirium** **– Malthouse Theatre in association with Schauspielhaus Vienna**; Broad – Maiden Australia Productions and Queensland Performing Arts Centre; The Motown Show - Human Nature – The Harbour Agency; Pannikin – Melbourne International Arts Festival and Marguerite Pepper Productions	**Paul Capsis – Boulevard Delirium**; The Go-Betweens – Danger in the Past: The Story of the Go-Betweens (Sydney Festival); Delta Goodrem – Delta Goodrem: The Visualise Tour 2005 (Dainty Consolidated Entertainment); Andrew Tierney, Mike Tierney, Toby Allen, Phil Burton – The Motown Show - Human Nature
Best Contemporary Music Festival	Best International Contemporary Music Concert
**The 17th Annual East Coast Blues and Roots Festival – Peter Noble, Chugg Entertainment, Talentworks and Definitive Events**; Apollo Bay Music Festival – Apollo Bay Music Festival; Splendour in the Grass 2005 – Splendour in the Grass; St Jeromes Laneway Festival – Rockin Roll Circus and Chugg Entertainment	**Il Divo – Dainty Consolidated Entertainment**; Mariza – Sydney Festival; Orion – Melbourne International Arts Festival and Pomegranate Arts; Pat Metheny Trio – Adelaide Festival of Arts

=== Other ===
Best Presentation for Children	Best Comedy Performer
**Stella and the Moon Man – Kim Carpenter's Theatre of Image with Sydney Theatre Company and Australian Youth Orchestra**; The Green Sheep – Windmill Performing Arts; Rabbit – Buzz Dance Theatre; Space Magic – Hi-5 Productions	**Colin Lane and Frank Woodley – Lano & Woodley - Goodbye (Token Events)**; David Collins & Shane Dundas – The Umbilical Brothers - The Rehearsal (A-List Entertainment); Judith Lucy – I Failed! (Token Events); Akmal Saleh – Akmal Live (A-List Entertainment)
Best Special Event
**Festival Melbourne 2006 (Performing Arts Program) – Arts Projects Australia**; Il Cielo che Danza (The Dancing Sky) and The City of Bells – Adelaide Festival of Arts and Studio Festi; Mazda's Opera in the Domain - Madama Butterfly – Opera Australia; Red Shoe Delivery Service – Melbourne International Arts Festival, the Arts Centre and Red Shoe Delivery Service

=== Industry ===
Best New Australian Work
**Garry Stewart – Garry Stewart and Louis-Philippe Demers' Devolution (Adelaide Festival of Arts, Australian Dance Theatre and Sydney Festival)**; Debra Batton (original concept) and Mark Murphy (story development) – On the Case; Bruce Gladwin, Simon Laherty, Sonia Teuben, Genevieve Morris & Jim Russell (co-devisors) – Small Metal Objects (Back to Back Theatre and Melbourne International Arts Festival); Michael Smetanin – Sydney Symphony Contemporary Music Festival; Mysterium Cosmographicum (Sydney Symphony)
Best Original Score	Best Music Direction
**Casey Bennetto – Keating! A country soul opera (Catherine Woodfield)**; Iain Grandage – The Drover's Wives (Steamworks Arts Production in association with Black Swan Theatre Company); Iain Grandage – The Odyssey; Carl Polke – On the Case	**Stephen Murphy – Dusty: The Original Pop Diva**; Roman Gottwald – Boulevard Delirium; Ian McDonald – The 25th Annual Putnam County Spelling Bee; Trevor Pinnock – Rinaldo
Best Scenic Design	Best Costume Design
**Anna Tregloan – The Odyssey**; Shaun Gurton – King Lear; Roger Kirk – Dusty: The Original Pop Diva; Dave Jones – On the Case	**Zoe Atkinson – The Odyssey**; Jennifer Irwin – Amalgamate (The Australian Ballet & Bangarra Dance Theatre); Leon Krasenstein – A Midsummer Night's Dream; Nina Randall – Tempo Rouge (Dion & Randall Productions)
Best Lighting Design	Best Sound Design
**Louis-Philippe Demers – Garry Stewart and Louis-Philippe Demers' Devolution**; Damien Cooper – Summer Rain; Matt Scott – King Lear; Paul Jackson – The Odyssey	**Michael Waters – Dusty: The Original Pop Diva**; David Franzke – The Odyssey; Max Lyandvert – Julius Caesar; Michael O'Brien – PreTender

=== Lifetime Achievement ===
JC Williamson Award
- **Graeme Bell MBE AO**
- **John Clark AM**
