= Helpmann Award for Best New Australian Work =

Australian entertainment award

Helpmann Award Best New Australian Work
- Country: Australia
- Presented by: Live Performance Australia
- First award: 2001
- Currently held by: S. Shakthidharan and Eamon Flack, for Counting and Cracking
- Website: www.helpmannawards.com.au

The Helpmann Award for Best New Australian Work is an award presented by Live Performance Australia (LPA), an employers' organisation which serves as the peak body in the live entertainment and performing arts industries in Australia. The accolade is handed out at the annual Helpmann Awards, which celebrates achievements in musical theatre, contemporary music, comedy, opera, classical music, theatre, dance and physical theatre in Australia.

The award is presented to the author, composer, book writer or lyricist of the production.

As of 2022, the 2019 event was the last one held, owing to the COVID-19 pandemic in Australia.

== Winners and nominees ==
Winners are listed first and marked in a separate colour, in boldface.

Year	Title	Nominee(s)	Genre
**2001** (1st)
**2001** (1st)	**Skin**	**Stephen Page**	**Ballet or Dance**
**2001** (1st)	The Boy From Oz	Nick Enright	Musicals
**2001** (1st)	Life After George	Hannie Rayson	Theatre
**2001** (1st)	The Theft of Sita	Nigel Jamieson	
**2002** (2nd)
**2002** (2nd)	**Batavia**	**Richard Mills** and **Peter Goldsworthy**	**Opera**
**2002** (2nd)	Corroboree	Stephen Page	Ballet or Dance
**2002** (2nd)	Mavis Goes to Timor	Angela Chaplin, Katherine Thomson and Kavisha Mazzella	Theatre
**2002** (2nd)	A Man with Five Children	Nick Enright	Theatre
**2003** (3rd)
**2003** (3rd)	**Walkabout**	**Stephen Page** and **Frances Rings**	**Ballet or Dance**
**2003** (3rd)	Bill and Mary	Bille Brown	Theatre
**2003** (3rd)	Love in the Age of Therapy	Paul Grabowsky and Joanna Murray-Smith	Opera
**2003** (3rd)	Oboe Concerto for Diana Doherty	Ross Edwards	Classical Music
**2004** (4th)
**2004** (4th)	**Inheritance**	**Hannie Rayson**	**Theatre**
**2004** (4th)	Phobia	Douglas Horton and Gerry Brophy	
**2004** (4th)	Myth, Propaganda and Disaster in Nazi Germany and Contemporary America - A Drama in 30 Scenes	Stephen Sewell	Theatre
**2004** (4th)	Held	Garry Stewart, ADT Dancers and Lois Greenfield	Ballet or Dance
**2005** (5th)
**2005** (5th)	**The Sapphires**	**Tony Briggs**	**Theatre**
**2005** (5th)	Madeline Lee	John Haddock with Michael Campbell	Opera
**2005** (5th)	Eating Ice Cream With Your Eyes Closed	David Brown	Theatre
**2005** (5th)	Through the Wire	Ros Horin	Theatre
**2006** (6th)
**2006** (6th)	**Devolution**	**Garry Stewart**	**Ballet or Dance**
**2006** (6th)	On the Case	Debra Batton and Mark Murphy	Physical or Visual Theatre
**2006** (6th)	Small Metal Objects	Bruce Gladwin, Simon Laherty, Sonia Teuben, Genevieve Morris and Jim Russel	Theatre
**2006** (6th)	Sydney Symphony Contemporary Music Festival: Mysterium Cosmographicum	Michael Smetanin	Classical Music
**2007** (7th)
**2007** (7th)	**The Lost Echo**	**Barrie Kosky** and **Tom Wright**	**Theatre**
**2007** (7th)	The Adventures of Snugglepot & Cuddlepie and Little Ragged Blossom	Alan John and John Clarke with Doug MacLeod	Musicals / Presentation for Children
**2007** (7th)	Structure and Sadness	Lucy Guerin	Ballet or Dance
**2007** (7th)	Honour Bound	Nigel Jamieson	Visual or Physical Theatre
**2007** (7th)	The Love of the Nightingale	Richard Mills and Timberlake Wertenbaker	Opera
**2007** (7th)	Priscilla, Queen of the Desert	Stephan Elliott and Allan Scott	Musicals
**2008** (8th)
**2008** (8th)	**Toy Symphony**	**Michael Gow**	**Theatre**
**2008** (8th)	Parramatta Girls	Alana Valentine	Theatre
**2008** (8th)	Glow	Gideon Obarzanek	Ballet or Dance
**2008** (8th)	When the Rain Stops Falling	Andrew Bovell	Theatre
**2009** (9th)
**2009** (9th)	**Shane Warne: The Musical**	**Eddie Perfect**	**Musicals**
**2009** (9th)	Just Macbeth!	Andy Griffiths	Theatre / Presentation for Children
**2009** (9th)	FOOD COURT	Back to Back Theatre with The Necks	Theatre
**2009** (9th)	Metro Street	Matthew Robinson	Musicals
**2010** (10th)
**2010** (10th)	**Smoke and Mirrors**	**Sydney Festival**, **Spiegeltent International**, **Craig Ilott** and **iOTA**	**Cabaret**
**2010** (10th)	Miracle	BalletLab and Phillip Adams	Ballet or Dance
**2010** (10th)	Bliss	Brett Dean and Amanda Holden	Opera
**2010** (10th)	Dirtsong	The Black Arm Band with Steven Richardson and Alexis Wright	
**2011** (11th)
**2011** (11th)	**Tim Minchin Vs Sydney Symphony**	**Tim Minchin** and **Sydney Symphony**	**Comedy**
**2011** (11th)	Finucane and Smith's Carnival of Mysteries	Finucane and Smith	Cabaret
**2011** (11th)	Silent Disco	Lachlan Philpott	Theatre
**2011** (11th)	Moth	Declan Greene	Theatre
**2011** (11th)	Where the Heart Is	Expressions Dance Company and Queensland Performing Arts Centre	Ballet or Dance
**2011** (11th)	Songs from the Middle	Eddie Perfect	
**2012** (12th)
**2012** (12th)	**Angela's Kitchen**	**Paul Capsis**, **Julian Meyrick** and **Hilary Bell**	**Theatre**
**2012** (12th)	Kursk: An Oratorio Requiem	David Chisholm	Classical Music
**2012** (12th)	Ganesh Versus the Third Reich	Mark Deans, Marcia Ferguson, Bruce Gladwin, Nicki Holland, Simon Laherty, Sarah Mainwaring, Scott Price, Kate Sulan, Brian Tilley and David Woods	Theatre
**2012** (12th)	Symphonia Eluvium	Elena Kats-Chernin	Classical Music
**2012** (12th)	Songs for Nobodies	Joanna Murray-Smith	Theatre
**2013** (13th)
**2013** (13th)	**The Secret River**	**Kate Grenville**. Adapted for the stage by **Andrew Bovell**	**Theatre**
**2013** (13th)	Midnight Son	Gordon Kerry and Louis Nowra	Opera
**2013** (13th)	The Happiest Refugee	Anh Do	
**2013** (13th)	King Kong	Craig Lucas (book), Marius de Vries (original music), Michael Mitnick and Richard Thomas (additional lyrics), featuring Songs and Original Compositions by 3D, Guy Garvey, Sarah McLachlan, Justice and The Avalanches	Musicals
**2013** (13th)	Medea	Kate Mulvany and Anne-Louise Sarks	Theatre
**2013** (13th)	School Dance	Matthew Whittet	Theatre
**2014** (14th)
**2014** (14th)	**Pinocchio**	**Rosemary Myers with Julianne O'Brien**	**Musicals / Presentation for Children**
**2014** (14th)	Wulamanayuwi & the Seven Pamanui	Jason De Santis & Eamon Flack	Theatre / Presentation for Children
**2014** (14th)	The Shadow King	Tom E. Lewis and Michael Kantor	Theatre
**2014** (14th)	Black Diggers	Tom Wright	Theatre
**2015** (15th)
**2015** (15th)	**The Rabbits**	**Kate Miller-Heidke (composer), Lally Katz (librettist) and Iain Grandage (musical arrangements and additional music)**	**Opera / Presentation for Children**
**2015** (15th)	Little Bird	Nicki Bloom (writer and co-lyricist), Quentin Grant (composer and co-lyricist) and Cameron Goodall (composer and co-lyricist)	
**2015** (15th)	What Rhymes with Cars and Girls	Aidan Fennessy (writer) and Tim Rogers (music and lyrics)	Theatre
**2015** (15th)	Marlin	Damien Millar	Theatre / Presentation for Children
**2015** (15th)	Switzerland	Joanna Murray-Smith	Theatre
**2015** (15th)	Endings	Tamara Saulwick & Peter Knight	
**2016** (16th)
**2016** (16th)	**Ladies in Black**	**Carolyn Burns and Tim Finn with Simon Phillips**	**Musicals**
**2016** (16th)	Prize Fighter	Future D. Fidel	Theatre
**2016** (16th)	Bambert's Book of Lost Stories	Dan Giovannoni and Luke Kerridge	Theatre / Presentation for Children
**2016** (16th)	The Gallipoli Symphony	Christopher Latham, Omar Faruk Tekbilek, Gareth Farr, Richard Nunns, Graeme Koehne AO, Peter Sculthorpe AO OBE, Elena Kats-Chernin, Kamran Ince, Ross Harris, Andrew Schultz, Ross Edwards and Demir Demirkan	Classical Music
**2016** (16th)	lore	Frances Rings, Deborah Brown and Waangenga Blanco	Dance
**2016** (16th)	Picnic at Hanging Rock	Tom Wright	Theatre
**2017** (17th)
**2017** (17th)	**The Drover's Wife**	**Leah Purcell**	**Theatre**
**2017** (17th)	Hot Brown Honey	Busty Beatz and Lisa Fa’alafi	Cabaret
**2017** (17th)	The Wider Earth	David Morton	Theatre
**2017** (17th)	Jasper Jones	Kate Mulvany	Theatre
**2017** (17th)	Backbone	Darcy Grant, Elliot Zoerner, Shenton Gregory, Geoff Cobham, Jacob Randell, Jascha Boyce, Simon McClure, Lachlan Binns, Mieke Lizotte, Lewie West, Martin Schreiber, Joanne Curry, Lachlan Harper, Jackson Manson, Triton Tunis-Mitchell and Lewis Rankin	Visual or Physical Theatre
**2017** (17th)	Girl Asleep	Matthew Whittet	Theatre
**2018** (18th)
**2018** (18th)	**Bennelong**	**Stephen Page**	**Ballet or Dance**
**2018** (18th)	Hamlet	Brett Dean and Matthew Jocelyn	Opera
**2018** (18th)	Muriel's Wedding The Musical	PJ Hogan, Kate Miller-Heidke and Keir Nuttall	Musicals
**2018** (18th)	Black is the New White	Nakkiah Lui	Theatre
**2018** (18th)	Laser Beak Man	Nicholas Paine, David Morton, Tim Sharp and Sam Cromack	Theatre
**2018** (18th)	Lano & Woodley — Fly	Colin Lane and Frank Woodley	Comedy
**2019** (19th)
**2019** (19th)	**Counting and Cracking**	**S. Shakthidharan and Eamon Flack**	**Theatre**
**2019** (19th)	Spinifex Gum	Felix Riebl	Contemporary Music
**2019** (19th)	Barbara and the Camp Dogs	Ursula Yovich and Alana Valentine	Musicals
**2019** (19th)	Blackie Blackie Brown: The Traditional Owner of Death	Nakkiah Lui	Theatre
**2019** (19th)	The Harp in the South: Part One and Part Two	Kate Mulvany	Theatre
**2019** (19th)	Lé Nør (The Rain)	The Last Great Hunt and Artistic Collaborators	Theatre

== See also ==
- Helpmann Awards
