= 4th Helpmann Awards =

Australian live performance awards held in 2004

- Date: 9 August 2004
- Location: Lyric Theatre, Sydney
- Hosted by: Simon Burke

Television/radio coverage
- Network: Ovation

The 4th Helpmann Awards ceremony was presented by the Australian Entertainment Industry Association (AEIA) (currently known by its trade name, Live Performance Australia (LPA)), for achievements in disciplines of Australia's live performance sectors. The ceremony took place on 9 August 2004 at the Lyric Theatre. During the ceremony, the AEIA handed out awards in 35 categories for achievements in theatre, musicals, opera, ballet, dance and concerts.

== Winners and nominees ==
In the following tables, winners are listed first and highlighted in boldface.

=== Theatre ===
Best Play	Best Direction of a Play
**Inheritance – Melbourne Theatre Company**; Frozen – Melbourne Theatre Company; Myth, Propaganda, and Disaster in Nazi Germany and Contemporary America - A Drama in 30 Scenes – Playbox Theatre in collaboration with State Theatre Company of South Australia; The Servant of Two Masters – The Bell Shakespeare Company	**Simon Phillips – Inheritance**; Neil Armfield – The Lieutenant of Inishmore (Company B Belvoir); John Bell – The Servant of Two Masters; Julian Meyrick – Frozen
Best Female Actor in a Play	Best Male Actor in a Play
**Maggie Smith – Talking Heads - Bed Among the Lentils (International Concert Attractions & Duncan C Weldon, Paul Elliott, Robert Fox)**; Carol Burns – A Conversation (Queensland Theatre Company); Judy Davis – Victory (Sydney Theatre Company); Helen Morse – Frozen	**Darren Gilshenan – The Servant of Two Masters**; Paul Blackwell – Night Letters (State Theatre Company of South Australia in association with Playbox and Adelaide Festival); Frank Gallacher – Frozen; David Gulpilil – Gulpilil (Company B Belvoir, Adelaide Festival of Arts and Brisbane Festival)
Best Female Actor in a Supporting Role in a Play	Best Male Actor in a Supporting Role in a Play
**Belinda McClory – Frozen**; Rebecca Massey – The Underpants (Company B Belvoir); Amber McMahon – The Snow Queen (Windmill Performing Arts and Sydney Theatre Company); Deidre Rubenstein – Night Letters	**David Field – Victory**; Steve Bisley – Inheritance; Wayne Blair – Inheritance; Tom Budge – The Lieutenant of Inishmore

=== Musicals ===
Best Musical
**The Lion King – Disney Theatrical Productions (Aust)**; The Full Monty – David Atkins Enterprises and IMG in association with International Concert Attractions and the Arts Centre; Oh! What a Night – Jon Nicholls, Michael Brereton and Stuart Littlewood; We Will Rock You – Michael Coppel, Queen Theatrical Productions, Phil McIntyre and Tribeca Theatrical Productions in association with EMI, Michael Watt, Paul Roberts, Bob and Kate Gare
Best Direction of a Musical	Best Choreography in a Musical
**Julie Taymor – The Lion King**; Dean Bryant – The Last Five Years (Echelon Productions); Ben Elton – We Will Rock You; Jack O'Brien (originating director) recreated by Matt August – The Full Monty	**Garth Fagan – The Lion King**; Kim Gavin – Oh! What a Night; Jerry Mitchell – The Full Monty; Arlene Phillips – We Will Rock You
Best Female Actor in a Musical	Best Male Actor in a Musical
**Kate Hoolihan – We Will Rock You**; Maryanne McCormack – The Full Monty; Ursula Yovich – The Threepenny Opera (Company B Belvoir); Buyisile Zama – The Lion King	**Matt Hetherington – The Full Monty**; Peter Carroll – The Republic of Myopia (Sydney Theatre Company); Michael Falzon – We Will Rock You; Tony Harvey – The Lion King
Best Female Actor in a Supporting Role in a Musical	Best Male Actor in a Supporting Role in a Musical
**Amanda Harrison – We Will Rock You**; Paula Arundell – The Threepenny Opera; Cherine Peck – The Lion King; Prinnie Stevens – Oh! What a Night	**Robert Grubb – We Will Rock You**; Terry Bader – The Lion King; Mitchell Butel – The Republic of Myopia; Rodney Dobson – The Full Monty

=== Opera and Classical Music ===
Best Opera	Best Direction of an Opera
**Dead Man Walking – State Opera of South Australia**; Otello – Opera Australia	**Brad Dalton – Dead Man Walking**; Nigel Jamieson – Brundibar (Windmill Performing Arts in association with State Opera of South Australia, Adelaide Symphony Orchestra & Come Out); Harry Kupfer – Otello; Simon Phillips – Lulu (Opera Australia)
Best Female Performer in an Opera	Best Male Performer in an Opera
**Emma Matthews – Lulu**; Kirsti Harms – Dead Man Walking; Nicole Youl – Cavalleria Rusticana & I Pagliacci (West Australian Opera); Shu Cheen Yu – The Possessed (Chamber Made Opera)	**Teddy Tahu Rhodes – Dead Man Walking**; Dennis O'Neill – Cavalleria Rusticana & I Pagliacci; Jonathan Summers – Otello
Best Female Performer in a Supporting Role in an Opera	Best Male Performer in a Supporting Role in an Opera
**Elizabeth Campbell – Dead Man Walking**; Catherine Carby – Lulu	**John Pringle – Lulu**; Douglas McNicol – Dead Man Walking; Gary Rowley – The Possessed
Best Classical Concert Presentation	Best Performance in a Classical Concert
**Gala: Verdi Requiem –** **Sydney Symphony Orchestra**; Antarctica – Tasmanian Symphony Orchestra; The Grainger Special 2003 – Adelaide Symphony Orchestra; Requiem – Adelaide Symphony Orchestra	**Edo de Waart – Wagner Concert (Sydney Symphony Orchestra)**; Gianluigi Gelmetti – Verdi Messa da Requiem (Sydney Symphony Orchestra); Michael Kieran Harvey – Emerson Piano Concerto (Adelaide Symphony Orchestra); Markus Stenz – Varese Ameriques (Melbourne Symphony Orchestra)

=== Dance and Physical Theatre ===
Best Ballet or Dance Work	Best Visual or Physical Theatre Production
**Bush – Bangarra Dance Theatre**; George Piper Dances – Sydney Festival in association with Sydney Opera House; Held – Australian Dance Theatre in association with Adelaide Festival of Arts and Anchorage Concert Association (Alaska); Underland – Sydney Dance Company	**acrobat – Melbourne International Arts Festival**; Eora Crossing – Sydney Festival, Legs On The Wall, Museum of Sydney; H2O - a fantastical voyage – Spare Parts Puppet Theatre
Best Choreography in a Ballet or Dance Work
**Garry Stewart and the ADT Dancers – Held**; Russell Maliphant – George Piper Dances - Torsion; Stephen Page – Bush; Stephen Petronio – Underland
Best Female Dancer in a Ballet or Dance Work	Best Male Dancer in a Ballet or Dance Work
**Larissa McGowan – Held**; Lucinda Dunn – The Four Temperaments (The Australian Ballet); Madeleine Eastoe – Romeo & Juliet (The Australian Ballet); Katherine Griffiths – Underland	**Ross McCormack – Held**; Marc Cassidy – Romeo & Juliet; Bradley Chatfield – Underland; Nathan Coppen – La Bohème - The Ballet (West Australian Ballet)

=== Contemporary Music ===
Best Contemporary Concert Presentation Arena
**Rolling Stones Licks World Tour 2003 at Sydney SuperDome**; Australian Idol Live; David Bowie 'A Reality Tour' at Sydney Entertainment Centre; P!NK "Try This Tour 2004"
Best Contemporary Concert Presentation Stadium	Best Contemporary Concert Presentation Theatre
**Big Day Out**; Melbourne International Music & Blues Festival; Robbie Williams	**Rolling Stones Licks World Tour 2003 at Enmore Theatre**; Sarah McLachlan Afterglow 2004; Taraf de Haïdouks; Tony Bennett & k.d. lang: The Wonderful World Tour at Sydney Opera House

=== Other ===
Best Special Event or Performance	Best Presentation for Children
**Dancing in the Streets – Melbourne International Arts Festival**; Gulpilil; His Majesty's Theatre Honours... – His Majesty's Theatre; The Journeys of William Yang: A Performance Retrospective – Company B Belvoir	**The Happy Prince – Kim Carpenter's Theatre of Image**; H2O - A Fantastical Voyage – Spare Parts Puppet Theatre; Hidden Dragons – Barking Gecko Theatre Company; Santa's Kingdom – David Atkins Enterprises, Garry Van Egmond Enterprises and International Concert Attractions

=== Industry ===
Best New Australian Work
**Inheritance**; Held; Myth, Propaganda and Disaster in Nazi Germany and Contemporary America - A Drama in 30 Scenes; Phobia
Best Original Score	Best Music Direction
**Elena Kats-Chernin – Wild Swans**; Gerry Brophy & Ensemble – Phobia; Tim Rice, Elton John, Lebo M, Hans Zimmer, Julie Taymor, Mark Mancina & Jay Rifkin – We Will Rock You; David Page – Unaipon (Clan Act I)	**Mike Dixon, Brian May & Roger Taylor – We Will Rock You**; John DeMain – Dead Man Walking; Phillip Scott – The Republic of Myopia; Simone Young – Lulu
Best Costume Design	Best Scenic Design
**Julie Taymor – The Lion King**; Anna French – Molto Vivace (The Australian Ballet); Jennifer Irwin – Bush; Tess Schofield – Victory	**Peter England – Unaipon (Clan Act II)**; Stephen Curtis – Lulu; Shaun Gurton – Inheritance; Dan Potra – Brundibar
Best Lighting Design	Best Sound Design
**Nick Schlieper – Bush**; Donald Holder – The Lion King; Andrew Lake – H2O - a fantastical voyage; Nick Schlieper – Inheritance	**Bobby Aitken – We Will Rock You**; Paul Healy & Tony Cohen – Underland; Steve Kennedy – The Lion King; Darren Steffan – Phobia

=== Lifetime Achievement ===
JC Williamson Award
- John Farnham
- John Sumner
