= Helpmann Award for Best Contemporary Concert Presentation =

Former annual Australian award

The Helpmann Award for Best Contemporary Concert Presentation was an award, presented by Live Performance Australia (LPA) at the annual Helpmann Awards from 2003-2004. The award was first presented in 2003, as an award for a concert presentation but was split into three categories in 2004, for concerts in arena's, stadium's and theatre's. The awards were replaced by the awards for Best Australian Contemporary Concert, Best Contemporary Music Festival and Best International Contemporary Concert. In the following list winners are listed first and marked in gold, in boldface, and the nominees are listed below with no highlight.

== Winners and nominees ==
Winners are listed first and marked in a separate colour, in boldface.

=== Best Contemporary Music Concert Presentation ===
Year	Artist(s)/Event	Production company(ies)
**2003** (3rd)	**Soweto Gospel Choir**	**International Concert Attractions and Hocking & Vigo**
2003 (3rd)	Women in Voice 11	Queensland Performing Arts Centre, Folk Federation and Annie Peterson
2003 (3rd)	Fiddlers' Bid	Melbourne Festival and National Partners
2003 (3rd)	George and special guest Jon Lord with the Sydney Symphony	Sydney Festival and Sydney Opera House in association with Sydney Symphony

=== Best Contemporary Concert Presentation – Arena ===
Year	Artist(s) and Event	Production company(ies)
**2004** (4th)	**Rolling Stones** – **Licks World Tour 2003** at **Sydney SuperDome**	**Dainty Consolidated Entertainment** and **Clear Channel Entertainment**
2004 (4th)	Australian Idol Live	Michael Chugg Entertainment, Talentworks and Jack Utsick Presents
2004 (4th)	Pink – Try This Tour 2004	Michael Coppel Presents
2004 (4th)	David Bowie – A Reality Tour at Sydney Entertainment Centre	Dainty Consolidated Entertainment and Clear Channel Entertainment

=== Best Contemporary Concert Presentation – Stadium ===
Year	Artist(s)/Event	Production company(ies)
**2004** (4th)	**Big Day Out**	**Creative Festival Entertainment**
2004 (4th)	Robbie Williams	Michael Chugg Entertainment and Jack Utsick Presents
2004 (4th)	Melbourne International Music and Blues Festival	Michael Chugg Entertainment, Definitive Events and Talentworks

=== Best Contemporary Concert Presentation – Theatre ===
Year	Artist(s) and Event	Production company(ies)
**2004** (4th)	**Rolling Stones** – **Licks World Tour 2003** at Enmore Theatre	**Dainty Consolidated Entertainment** and **Clear Channel Entertainment**
2004 (4th)	Sarah McLachlan – Afterglow Tour 2004	Michael Coppel Presents
2004 (4th)	Taraf de Haïdouks	Sydney Festival
2004 (4th)	Tony Bennett and k.d. lang: The Wonderful World Tour at the Sydney Opera House	Dainty Consolidated Entertainment

== See also ==
- Best Australian Contemporary Concert
- Best Contemporary Music Festival
- Best International Contemporary Concert
