= Helpmann Award for Best Female Actor in a Play =

Annual Australian theatre award

The Helpmann Award for Best Female Actor in a Play is an award presented by Live Performance Australia (LPA) (the trade name for the Australian Entertainment Industry Association (AEIA)), an employers' organisation which serves as the peak body in the live entertainment and performing arts industries in Australia. The accolade is handed out at the annual Helpmann Awards, which celebrates achievements in musical theatre, contemporary music, comedy, opera, classical music, theatre, dance and physical theatre.

Cate Blanchett has the most wins in this category with four, for Hedda Gabler, Uncle Vanya, Gross und Klein (Big and Small) and The Maids.

== Winners and nominees ==
In the following list winners are listed first and marked in gold, in boldface, and the nominees are listed below with no highlight.

Winners are listed first and marked in a separate colour, in boldface.

Year	Actor	Production	Character(s)
**2001** (1st)
**2001** (1st)	**Caroline O'Connor**	**Piaf**	**Edith Piaf**
**2001** (1st)	Amanda Muggleton	The Book Club	Deborah
**2001** (1st)	Robyn Nevin	A Cheery Soul	Miss Docker
**2001** (1st)	Leah Purcell	Box the Pony	Leah/Steff
**2002** (2nd)
**2002** (2nd)	**Amanda Muggleton**	**Master Class**	**Maria Callas**
**2002** (2nd)	Essie Davis	The School for Scandal	Lady Teazle
**2002** (2nd)	Kris McQuade	Cloudstreet	Dolly Pickle
**2002** (2nd)	Caroline O'Connor	Bombshells	Various^{[A]}
**2003** (3rd)
**2003** (3rd)	**Rachel Griffiths**	**Proof**	**Catherine**
**2003** (3rd)	Deborah Mailman	The Seven Stages of Grieving (co-written by Mailman)	Woman
**2003** (3rd)	Miranda Otto	A Doll's House	Nora Helmer
**2003** (3rd)	Sigrid Thornton	The Blue Room	Various^{[B]}
**2004** (4th)
**2004** (4th)	**Maggie Smith**	**Talking Heads – A Bed Among the Lentils**	**Susan**
**2004** (4th)	Carol Burns	A Conversation	The Mother
**2004** (4th)	Judy Davis	Victory	Bradshaw
**2004** (4th)	Helen Morse	Frozen	Nancy
**2005** (5th)
**2005** (5th)	**Cate Blanchett**	**Hedda Gabler**	**Hedda Gabler**
**2005** (5th)	Julie Forsyth	The Ham Funeral	Alma Lusty
**2005** (5th)	Deborah Mailman	The Sapphires	Cynthia Mcrae
**2005** (5th)	Pamela Rabe	Dinner	Paige
**2006** (6th)
**2006** (6th)	**Caroline O'Connor**	**End of the Rainbow**	**Judy Garland**
**2006** (6th)	Jennifer Flowers	Doubt	Sister Aloysius
**2006** (6th)	Victoria Longley	The Goat, or Who Is Sylvia?	Stevie
**2006** (6th)	Leah Purcell	Stuff Happens	Condoleezza Rice
**2007** (7th)
**2007** (7th)	**Ursula Yovich**	**Capricornia**	**Capricornia**
**2007** (7th)	Elena Kalinina	Uncle Vanya	Sonia
**2007** (7th)	Pamela Rabe	Mother Courage and Her Children	Mother Courage
**2007** (7th)	Alison van Reeken	The Carnivores	Nill and Neka
**2008** (8th)
**2008** (8th)	**Leah Purcell**	**The Story of the Miracles at Cookie's Table**	**Annie**
**2008** (8th)	Kate Dickie	Aalst	Cathy Delaney
**2008** (8th)	Catherine McClements	Who's Afraid of Virginia Woolf?	Martha
**2008** (8th)	Genevieve Picot	Rock 'n' Roll	Eleanor/Esme
**2009** (9th)
**2009** (9th)	**Robyn Nevin**	**Women of Troy**	**Hecuba**
**2009** (9th)	Alison Bell	Blackbird	Una
**2009** (9th)	Cate Blanchett	War of the Roses	Richard II
**2009** (9th)	Pamela Rabe	War of the Roses	Richard III
**2010** (10th)
**2010** (10th)	**Julie Forsyth**	**Happy Days**	**Winnie**
**2010** (10th)	Kathryn Hunter	Kafka's Monkey	Ape
**2010** (10th)	Jane Menelaus	August: Osage County	Barbara Fordham
**2010** (10th)	Robyn Nevin	August: Osage County	Violet Weston
**2011** (11th)
**2011** (11th)	**Cate Blanchett**	**Uncle Vanya**	**Yelena**
**2011** (11th)	Robin McLeavy	Measure for Measure	Isabella
**2011** (11th)	Robyn Nevin	Long Day's Journey into Night	Mary Cavan Tyrone
**2011** (11th)	Ursula Yovich	Waltzing the Wilarra	Elsa
**2012** (12th)
**2012** (12th)	**Cate Blanchett**	**Gross und Klein (Big and Small)**	**Lotte**
**2012** (12th)	Robyn Nevin	Neighbourhood Watch	Ana
**2012** (12th)	Bernadette Robinson	Songs For Nobodies	Various
**2012** (12th)	Helen Thomson	Summer of the Seventeenth Doll	Pearl
**2013** (13th)
**2013** (13th)	**Alison Bell**	**Hedda Gabler**	**Hedda Gabler Tesman**
**2013** (13th)	Alison Bell	Constellations	Marianne
**2013** (13th)	Helen Thomson	Mrs. Warren's Profession	Mrs Kitty Warren
**2013** (13th)	Christen O'Leary	End of the Rainbow	Judy Garland
**2014** (14th)
**2014** (14th)	**Cate Blanchett**	**The Maids**	**Claire**
**2014** (14th)	Zahra Newman	The Mountaintop	Camae
**2014** (14th)	Alison Whyte	The Bloody Chamber	
**2014** (14th)	Ursula Yovich	Mother Courage and her Children	Mother Courage
**2015** (15th)
**2015** (15th)	**Pamela Rabe**	**The Glass Menagerie**	
**2015** (15th)	Julie Forsyth	Night on Bald Mountain	
**2015** (15th)	Robyn Nevin	Suddenly Last Summer	
**2015** (15th)	Sarah Peirse	Switzerland	
**2016** (16th)
**2016** (16th)	**Paula Arundell**	**The Bleeding Tree**	
**2016** (16th)	Cate Blanchett	The Present	
**2016** (16th)	Noni Hazlehurst	Mother	
**2016** (16th)	Catherine McClements	The Events	
**2017** (17th)
**2017** (17th)	**Kate Mulvany**	**Richard 3**	
**2017** (17th)	Helen Morse	John	
**2017** (17th)	Leah Purcell	The Drover's Wife	
**2017** (17th)	Alison Whyte	Faith Healer	
**2018** (18th)
**2018** (18th)	**Pamela Rabe**	**The Children**	
**2018** (18th)	Miranda Daughtry	A Doll's House	
**2018** (18th)	Helen Morse	Memorial	
**2018** (18th)	Sarah Peirse	The Children	
**2019** (19th)
**2019** (19th)	**Kate Mulvany**	**Every Brilliant Thing**	
**2019** (19th)	Helen Thomson	Mary Stuart	Queen Elizabeth I
**2019** (19th)	Sarah Snook	Saint Joan	Saint Joan
**2019** (19th)	Melita Jurisic	Arbus & West	Mae West
**2019** (19th)	Paula Arundell	Harry Potter and the Cursed Child (Parts One and Two)	Hermione Granger (older)

== See also ==
- Helpmann Awards

== Notes ==
A: Caroline O'Connor played six characters in the play Bombshells: Meryl Davenport, Tiggy Entwhistle, Mary O’Donnell, Theresa McTerry, Winsome Webster and Zoe Struthers.
B: In The Blue Room, Sigrid Thornton portrayed the female characters: Irene, Marie, Emma, Kelly and the Actress.
