= Deborah Riedel =

Australian opera singer (1958–2009)

Deborah Riedel (31 July 1958 – 8 January 2009) was an Australian operatic soprano. Richard Bonynge described her "one of the greatest voices ever produced by Australia". She died of cancer at the height of her career, at the age of 50.

== Career ==
Riedel was born in Carlingford, New South Wales (in north-western Sydney). She gained a diploma of Music Education at the Sydney Conservatorium of Music, and taught for some time at Riverstone High School. She joined the chorus of Opera Australia (OA) in 1983. She won a number of important competitions, which enabled her to study overseas. Back in Australia, she sang mezzo-soprano roles with Victoria State Opera and West Australian Opera. At OA, her mentor Richard Bonynge guided her transition from mezzo to soprano. She first came to notice when she sang Leila in Georges Bizet's The Pearl Fishers with Victoria State Opera in 1986. This was followed with Susanna in The Marriage of Figaro for OA in 1989. That year, she was so successful from her auditions in Europe that she was forced to refuse a number of offers. She sang with such opera companies as The Royal Opera, London, Paris Opera, Geneva Opera, Bavarian State Opera, Rome Opera, Vienna State Opera, and many others.

She won the inaugural Givenchy French Operatic Award in 1994. Her American debut that year was as Amina in La sonnambula in San Diego. She also appeared with the Metropolitan Opera and San Francisco Opera.

Her work in Australia included roles in The Magic Flute, Don Giovanni, Maria Stuarda, Norma, La traviata, Il trovatore, La bohème, Tosca, Faust, The Tales of Hoffmann, Turandot and others. Internationally she sang the Marschallin in Der Rosenkavalier and Ellen Orford in Peter Grimes.

In 2004, she was Sieglinde in the first modern Australian production of Wagner's Ring Cycle, by the State Opera of South Australia.

Riedel was diagnosed with cancer in 1999, but she continued working until close to her death on 8 January 2009.
