= Helpmann Award for Best Performance in an Australian Contemporary Concert =

Former annual Australian award

The Helpmann Award for Best Performance in an Australian Contemporary Concert was an award, presented by Live Performance Australia (LPA) at the annual Helpmann Awards from 2005-2008. In the following list winners are listed first and marked in gold, in boldface, and the nominees are listed below with no highlight.

== Winners and nominees ==
Winners are listed first and marked in a separate colour, in boldface.

| Year | Performer(s) | Concert/event/production |
|---|---|---|
| **2005** (5th) | **Kate Miller-Heidke** | **Women in Voice 14** |
| 2005 (5th) | Paul Grabowsky | Tales of Time and Space |
| 2005 (5th) | Missy Higgins | N/A |
| 2005 (5th) | Midnight Oil | WaveAid |
| **2006** (6th) | **Paul Capsis** | **Boulevard Delirium** |
| 2006 (6th) | The Go-Betweens | Danger in the Past: The Story of the Go-Betweens |
| 2006 (6th) | Delta Goodrem | The Visualise Tour |
| 2006 (6th) | Andrew Tierney, Mike Tierney, Toby Allen and Phil Burton | Human Nature - The Motown Show |
| **2007** (7th) | **David Campbell** | **"Wild With Style"** |
| 2007 (7th) | Damien Leith | The Winner’s Journey – Live |
| 2007 (7th) | Kylie Minogue | Showgirl: The Homecoming Tour |
| 2007 (7th) | Olivia Newton-John | Olivia Newton-John with the Sydney Symphony |
| **2008** (8th) | **David Campbell** | **The Swing Sessions 2** |
| 2008 (8th) | Guy Sebastian | The Memphis Tour |
| 2008 (8th) | Kate Ceberano | Nine Lime Avenue tour |
| 2008 (8th) | Tina Arena | Tina Arena in concert |

== See also ==
- Helpmann Awards
