= Helpmann Award for Best Choreography in a Musical =

Annual Australian musical theatre award

- Awarded for: Best Choreography in a Musical
- Location: Australia
- Presented by: Live Performance Australia
- Currently held by: Jerry Mitchell for Kinky Boots (2017)
- Website: HelpmannAwards.com.au

The Helpmann Award for Best Choreography in a Musical is a musical award, presented by Live Performance Australia (LPA) at the annual Helpmann Awards since 2001. This is a list of winners and nominations for the Helpmann Award for Best Choreography in a Musical.

== Winners and nominees ==
Winners are listed first and marked in a separate colour.

=== 2000s ===
Year	Choreographer(s)	Production
2001 (1st)
2001 (1st)	Ann Reinking	Chicago
2001 (1st)	Anthony Van Laast	The Boy from Oz
2001 (1st)	Kelley Abbey	Fame
2001 (1st)	Stephen Page	The Sunshine Club
2002 (2nd)
2002 (2nd)	David Atkins	Singin' in the Rain
2002 (2nd)	Tony Bartuccio	The Pirates of Penzance
2002 (2nd)	Kim Gavin	Oh! What a Night
2002 (2nd)	Anthony Van Laast	Mamma Mia!
2003 (3rd)
2003 (3rd)	Cynthia Onrubia and Rob Marshall	Cabaret
2003 (3rd)	Kelley Abbey	Footloose
2003 (3rd)	Geoff Garratt and Matthew Bourne	Oliver!
2003 (3rd)	Stephen Mear and Bob Avian	The Witches of Eastwick
2004 (4th)
2004 (4th)	Garth Fagan	The Lion King
2004 (4th)	Kim Gavin	Oh! What A Night
2004 (4th)	Jerry Mitchell	The Full Monty
2004 (4th)	Arlene Phillips	We Will Rock You
2005 (5th)
2005 (5th)	Susan Stroman	The Producers
2005 (5th)	Ross Coleman	Urinetown
2005 (5th)	Paul Mercurio	Annie Get Your Gun
2005 (5th)	Arlene Phillips	Saturday Night Fever
2006 (6th)
2006 (6th)	Ross Coleman	Dusty – The Original Pop Diva
2006 (6th)	Ross Coleman	The 25th Annual Putnam County Spelling Bee
2006 (6th)	Andrew Hallsworth	Leader of the Pack
2006 (6th)	Andrew Hallsworth	Menopause The Musical
2007 (7th)
2007 (7th)	Kelley Abbey and Kenny Ortega	The Boy from Oz
2007 (7th)	Geoffrey Garratt and Bob Avian	Miss Saigon
2007 (7th)	Ross Coleman	Pippin
2007 (7th)	Ross Coleman	Priscilla, Queen of the Desert
2008 (8th)
2008 (8th)	Peter Darling	Billy Elliot the Musical
2008 (8th)	Rob Ashford	Guys and Dolls
2008 (8th)	Ross Coleman	Sweet Charity
2008 (8th)	Ross Coleman	Shout! The Legend Of The Wild One
2009 (9th)
2009 (9th)	Wayne Cilento	Wicked
2009 (9th)	Gideon Obarzanek	Shane Warne: The Musical
2009 (9th)	Jo Stone	Metro Street
2009 (9th)	Nathan M. Wright	Gutenberg! The Musical!

=== 2010s ===
Year	Choreographer(s)	Production
2010 (10th)
2010 (10th)	Kelley Abbey	Fame
2010 (10th)	Andrew Hallsworth	The Drowsy Chaperone
2010 (10th)	Sergio Trujillo	Jersey Boys
2010 (10th)	Nathan M. Wright	Avenue Q
2011 (11th)
2011 (11th)	Matthew Bourne and Stephen Mear	Mary Poppins
2011 (11th)	Jason Coleman	Hairspray
2011 (11th)	Kelly Devine	Dr Zhivago
2011 (11th)	Graeme Murphy	Love Never Dies
2012 (12th)
2012 (12th)	Kelly Devine	Rock of Ages
2012 (12th)	Kelly Aykers	Annie
2012 (12th)	Michael Bennett	A Chorus Line
2012 (12th)	Andrew Hallsworth	An Officer and a Gentleman
2013 (13th)
2013 (13th)	Jerry Mitchell	Legally Blonde
2013 (13th)	Sergio Trujillo	The Addams Family
2013 (13th)	Christopher Gattelli	South Pacific
2013 (13th)	Tony Bartuccio	Chess
2014 (14th)
2014 (14th)	Andrew Hallsworth	Sweet Charity
2014 (14th)	John O'Connell	Strictly Ballroom The Musical
2014 (14th)	David Atkins and Dein Perry	Hot Shoe Shuffle
2014 (14th)	Susan Kikuchi	The King and I
2015 (15th)
2015 (15th)	Andrew Hallsworth	Anything Goes
2015 (15th)	Michael Ashcraft and Geoffrey Garratt	Les Misérables
2015 (15th)	Steven Hoggett	Once
2015 (15th)	Kate Champion and Michelle Lynch	Dirty Dancing - The Classic Story on Stage
2016 (16th)
2016 (16th)	Peter Darling	Matilda the Musical
2016 (16th)	Andrew Hallsworth	Little Shop of Horrors
2016 (16th)	Arlene Phillips	The Sound of Music
2016 (16th)	Andrew Wright	Singin' in the Rain
2017 (17th)
2017 (17th)	Jerry Mitchell	Kinky Boots
2017 (17th)	Christopher Gattelli	My Fair Lady
2017 (17th)	Casey Nicholaw	Aladdin
2017 (17th)	Casey Nicholaw	The Book of Mormon
2018 (18th)	Tom Hodgson	Mamma Mia!
2018 (18th)	Karen Bruce	The Bodyguard
2018 (18th)	Josh Prince	Beautiful: The Carole King Musical
2018 (18th)	Andrew Hallsworth	Muriel's Wedding
2019 (19th)	Malik Le Nost and Mitchell Woodcock	Saturday Night Fever
2019 (19th)	Amy Campbell	In the Heights
2019 (19th)	Joshua Bergasse	Roald Dahl's Charlie and the Chocolate Factory
2019 (19th)	Julio Monge	Handa Opera on Sydney Harbour: West Side Story

== See also ==
- Helpmann Awards
