= Bella Figura =

1995 ballet choreographed by Jiří Kylián

- Choreographer: Jiří Kylián
- Music: Lukas Foss; Giovanni Battista Pergolesi; Alessandro Marcello; Antonio Vivaldi; Giuseppe Torelli
- Premiere: 12 October 1995; AT&T Danstheater
- Original ballet company: Nederlands Dans Theater
- Design: Joke Visser; Jiří Kylián
- Genre: contemporary ballet

Bella Figura is a contemporary ballet choreographed by Jiří Kylián to music by Lukas Foss, Giovanni Battista Pergolesi, Alessandro Marcello, Antonio Vivaldi and Giuseppe Torelli. The ballet was made for the Nederlands Dans Theater, and premiered on 12 October 1995, at AT&T Danstheater, The Hague.

== Choreography ==
Bella Figura is danced by a cast of nine: five women and four men. Kylián described the ballet as "a journey in time, light and space, addressing the ambiguity of aesthetics, performances and dreams." According to dance scholar Katja Vaghi, "The themes dealt with are the inexpressibility of feeling through words, the blurring of reality and fiction, and the fluidity of identities." Luke Jennings and Deborah Bull wrote, "The dance itself is a series of flicker-book images with every page impeccable – upper bodies sharply torsioned, arms cleaving space, leg-lines racily hyperextended."

Like many of Kylián's works, Bella Figura makes references to the Baroque, evident in the choreography, music and lighting design, the latter inspired by Caravaggio's chiaroscuro. In parts of the ballet, both men and women are in long red skirts and topless. Kylián intended to equalise the men and women and the costumes have no sexual meanings. The curtain moves in the ballet to frame and reshape the stage, drape on the dancers and echo the choreography.

== Development ==
In 1995, Kylián, Nederlands Dans Theater's artistic director, was commissioned by NRC Handelsblad's editor-in-chief to choreograph a ballet for the newspaper's 25th anniversary. Kylián requested and was granted full creative freedom, due to his belief that art is not art without independence. Bella Figura features both contemporary compositions by Lukas Foss, and Baroque music, by Giovanni Battista Pergolesi, Alessandro Marcello, Antonio Vivaldi and Giuseppe Torelli, with sound design by Dick Heuff and Jorn Mineur. The title of the ballet means both "beautiful body" and "putting on a brave face" in Italian.

In addition to choreographing Kylián also designed the set and lighting, the latter realised by Tom Bevoort. The costumes are designed by Joke Visser. Apart from the long red skirts the dancers wore when topless, the costumes also include leotards, tights and underwear in red, flesh colour and black mesh. According to dancer Johan Inger, none of the original cast members objected to appearing on stage nude. In some performances of the ballet, the dancers wear skin-coloured coverings, either because the dancers are not comfortable, or at the request of the venue the ballet is performed.

== Performances ==
Bella Figura premiered on 12 October 1995, at AT&T Danstheater, The Hague.

Other dance troupes that had performed Bella Figura include the Paris Opera Ballet, Boston Ballet, the Australian Ballet, Les Ballets de Monte-Carlo, Royal Swedish Ballet, Zürich Ballet and Finnish National Ballet.

== Music ==
- Lukas Foss: Lento and Andante from Salomon Rossi Suite
- Giovanni Battista Pergolesi: "Stabat Mater Dolorosa" and "Quando corpus morietur" from Stabat Mater
- Alessandro Marcello: Adagio from Hobo Concerto
- Antonio Vivaldi: Andante from Concerto for Two Mandolins and Strings
- Giuseppe Torelli: Grave from Concerto Grosso

== Original cast ==
- Brigitte Martin
- Stefan Źeromski
- Philippa Buckingham
- Joeri de Korte
- Elke Schepers
- Ken Ossila
- Lorraine Blouin
- Johan Inger
- Megumi Nakamura
