= Love in the Age of Therapy =

2002 opera by Paul Grabowsky

Love in the Age of Therapy is an opera composed by Paul Grabowsky with a libretto by Joanna Murray-Smith.

It premiered in October 2002 for OzOpera at the Playhouse, Victorian Arts Centre, as part of the Melbourne Festival. It also played a season at the Drama Theatre, Sydney Opera House, for the Sydney Festival in January 2003. The production received six nominations at the 2003 Helpmann Awards, including Best Opera, Best New Australian Work and Best Original Score.
