= Dinner (play) =

Theatre play

- West End Poster
- Written by: Moira Buffini
- Original language: English
- Genre: Comedy/Drama
- Setting: Contemporary; England

Premiere
- Date premiered: 18 October 2002
- Place premiered: Royal National Theatre, London

Dinner is a 2002 play by the British dramatist Moira Buffini. It premiered at the Royal National Theatre, London on 18 October 2002.

== Productions ==
=== Original Production ===
It was first performed at the Royal National Theatre in 2002, with the following cast:

- Harriet Walter - Paige
- Nicholas Farrell - Lars
- Penny Downie - Wynne
- Adrian Rawlins - Hal
- Catherine McCormack - Siân
- Paul Rattray - Mike
- Christopher Ettridge - The Waiter

The director was Fiona Buffini, and the designer was Rachel Blues.

It was revived at Wyndham's Theatre in December 2003, with Adrian Lukis as Hal, Flora Montgomery as Siân, Paul Kaye as Mike and Paul Sirr as The Waiter; all other parts were played by the original cast.

== Synopsis ==
Paige Janssen invites some friends over to dinner to mark the publication of a book, Beyond Belief, written by her husband, Lars. A succession of unusual courses, interrupted by the arrival of an unexpected guest, lead to some surprising revelations and, eventually, to death.

== See also ==
- Moira Buffini
