= Influence (play) =

2005 play by David Williamson

- Original language: English
- Written by: David Williamson

Premiere
- Date: March 2005
- Place: Drama Theatre, Sydney

Influence is a 2005 play by David Williamson about a right-wing radio "shock jock". It was inspired by the popularity of such personalities as Stan Zemanek, John Laws and Alan Jones.

Williamson described the lead character as "a racist, homophobic, neo-con, horrible shock jock ... I really enjoyed writing him because I let all my deep racist, sexist impulses and anti-Muslim impulses flow out, because I know they're there underneath and I know that I don't really believe in that value system but I know that lurking deep within us there's the capacity to be bigoted, shocking and terrible."
