= Life After George =

Play by Hannie Rayson

Life After George is a play by Australian playwright Hannie Rayson.

The play concerns the current and two former wives of Peter George, a charismatic professor, who dies in a plane crash. It explores progressive Australian intellectual and political life from the 1960s to the 1990s.

Life After George was originally produced by the Melbourne Theatre Company at the Fairfax Studio in 2000, which received the inaugural Helpmann Award for Best Play in 2001. Life After George also received various other Australian awards, including the AWGIE Award for stage and a Victorian Premier's Literary Award.

Its subsequent productions include a 2002 production at the Duchess Theatre in London's West End.
