= Batavia (opera) =

2001 opera by Richard Mills

Batavia is an opera in three acts and a prologue by Richard Mills to a libretto by Peter Goldsworthy, commissioned by Opera Australia. The plot is based on the historical events surrounding the Dutch sailing vessel Batavia's 1629 sinking and massacre of the shipwreck survivors.

The opera premiered on 11 May 2001 at the State Theatre (Melbourne) for the Centenary of Federation Festival. It received three Helpmann Awards and six Green Room Awards. The work lasts for about three hours and ten minutes with one interval. The CD recording was captured at the State Theatre, Victorian Arts Centre, Melbourne, on 11 and 13 May 2001.

Rolses, voice types, premiere cast
Role	Voice type	Premiere cast, 11 May 2001 Conductor: Richard Mills
Francis Pelsaert, commander	bass	Bruce Martin
Gijsbert Bastiensz, preacher	baritone	John Bolton-Wood
Wiebbe Hayes, provost	tenor	Barry Ryan
Jeronimus Cornelisz, undermerchant	baritone	Michael Lewis
Conraat van Huyssen, nobleman/company cadet	tenor	Jamie Allen
Lucretia Jansz	soprano	Anke Höppner
Zwaantie Hendricx, Lucretia's maid	soprano	Emma Matthews
Maria Bastiensz, the preacher's wife	mezzo-soprano	Elizabeth Campbell
Henchman	tenor	James Egglestone
Judit, the preacher's daughter	soprano	Joanne Blankfield
Willem, Judit's younger brother	boy soprano	Bill Dodd
Caspar, Wiebbe Hayes' son	boy soprano	Mark Casey
Bessel, Wiebbe Hayes' son	boy soprano	Christopher Toohey
Director		Lindy Hume
Design		Dan Potra
Lighting		Rory Dempster
Chorus
