= Helpmann Awards =

Awards for live performance in Australia

- Awarded for: "Distinguished artistic achievement and excellence in the many disciplines of Australia's vibrant live performance sectors"
- Country: Australia
- Presented by: Live Performance Australia
- First award: 2001
- Website: www.helpmannawards.com.au

Television/radio coverage
- Network: Ovation (2004–2005); Fox8 (2006); Bio. (2007–2009); Studio (2010–2012); Arena (2013–2014); Foxtel Arts (2015–2017); ABC (2018)

The Helpmann Awards are accolades for live entertainment and performing arts in Australia, presented by industry group Live Performance Australia (LPA) since 2001.

The annual awards recognise achievements in the disciplines of musical theatre, contemporary music, comedy, opera, classical music, theatre, dance and physical theatre. Over forty awards are given to productions, festivals and concerts, and for individuals for their work in performance, direction, choreography, lighting, sound, music, costume and scenic design.

They are named in honour of ballet dancer, choreographer, director and actor Sir Robert Helpmann.

The awards are the Australian equivalent of the United States' Tony Awards for Broadway theatre and the United Kingdom's Laurence Olivier Awards for West End theatre.

The Helpmann Awards were last awarded in 2019. LPA cancelled the 2020 and 2021 awards due to the COVID-19 pandemic. No public statement has been made for subsequent years.

== History ==
The Helpmann Awards were established in 2001 by the Australian Entertainment Industry Association (now known as Live Performance Australia (LPA)). They are named in honour of Australian actor, choreographer, dancer and theatre director, Sir Robert Helpmann.

At the inaugural Helpmann Awards, twenty six accolades were handed out for achievements in performance, direction, choreography, lighting, sound, music, costume and scenic design and production, in the disciplines of musical theatre, contemporary music, comedy, opera, classical music, theatre, dance and physical theatre. Over the years the categories expanded and now include many more honours.

== Aims and description ==
The aim of the awards is to promote Australia's live entertainment industry, both locally and internationally, by: recognising artistic achievements; administering the awards with integrity; ensuring the awards are celebrated by the industry and Australian community; and ensuring the ceremony is the most prestigious awards in the local industry and the highlight of each season.

Special non-competitive prizes are also bestowed upon individuals: the JC Williamson Award (named after theatre manager James Cassius Williamson), for one's life's work in Australia's live entertainment industry. This is the highest honour presented by Live Performance Australia. Other special awards are the Sue Nattrass Award, which recognises outstanding achievement in a field without high public profile, the Brian Stacey Memorial Award, and an award for Best Special Event.

== Eligibility and voting ==
To be eligible for the Helpmann Awards, a production must: be produced or presented by an LPA Member, or professionally produced by a non-Member that has paid an Industry Service Fee for the production; fall within the artistic or industry award categories; and officially open in Australia during the season (or for Best Regional Touring Production Award, undertake its first Australian regional tour during the season). Exemptions from the entry criteria can be granted in exceptional circumstances by a committee consisting of the LPA president, chief executive and chair of the Helpmann Awards Administration Committee (HAAC).

Nine nominating panels determine the nominees for their respective fields. These are: cabaret, children's presentation, comedy, contemporary music, dance and physical theatre, industry awards, musicals, opera and classical music, and theatre. The nominating panels comprises artists, creatives, arts administrators, writers, journalists, producers, promoters, venue managers and educators. The HAAC selects the chair of each panel, who in turn chooses the members of their respective fields. The nominations are then determined by each of them, who choose four per category. The winners are determined in a secret online ballot by the voters who are employees of LPA members, panelists and previous Helpmann winners and nominees.

== Award categories ==
The award categories are currently:

Theatre

- Best Play
- Best Direction of a Play
- Best Male Actor in a Play
- Best Female Actor in a Play
- Best Male Actor in a Supporting Role – Play
- Best Female Actor in a Supporting Role – Play

Musicals

- Best Musical
- Best Direction of a Musical
- Best Choreography in a Musical
- Best Male Actor in a Musical
- Best Female Actor in a Musical
- Best Male Actor in a Supporting Role – Musical
- Best Female Actor in a Supporting Role – Musical

Opera and classical music

- Best Opera
- Best Symphony Orchestra Concert
- Best Chamber and Instrumental Ensemble Concert
- Best Direction of an Opera
- Best Male Performer in an Opera
- Best Female Performer in an Opera
- Best Male Performer in a Supporting Role – Opera
- Best Female Performer in a Supporting Role – Opera
- Best Individual Classical Music Performance

Dance and physical theatre

- Best Ballet
- Best Dance Production
- Best Visual or Physical Theatre Production
- Best Choreography in a Dance or Physical Theatre Production
- Best Male Dancer in a Dance or Physical Theatre Production
- Best Female Dancer in a Dance or Physical Theatre Production

Contemporary music

- Best International Contemporary Concert
- Best Australian Contemporary Concert
- Best Contemporary Music Festival

Other

- Best Regional Touring Production
- Best Comedy Performer
- Best Cabaret Performer
- Best Presentation for Children

Industry

- Best New Australian Work
- Best Original Score
- Best Music Direction
- Best Costume Design
- Best Scenic Design
- Best Lighting Design
- Best Sound Design

Special awards

- JC Williamson Award
- Sue Nattrass Award
- Brian Stacey Memorial Award
- Best Special Event

Retired

- Best Ballet or Dance Work
- Best Classical Concert Presentation
- Best Contemporary Concert Presentation
- Best Live Music Presentation
- Best Performance in an Australian Contemporary Concert

== Ceremony ==
The annual Helpmann Awards ceremony is usually held between May and September. They have been variously held in Sydney at the Star City Show Room, Sydney Lyric, Sydney Opera House and the Capitol Theatre, and at the Arts Centre Melbourne. Australian stage and screen actor Simon Burke has presided over the event seven times, the most of any other person, from 2001 to 2006, and again in 2012. The awards have been broadcast since 2004 on various Foxtel channels, and since 2018 live on ABC Television.

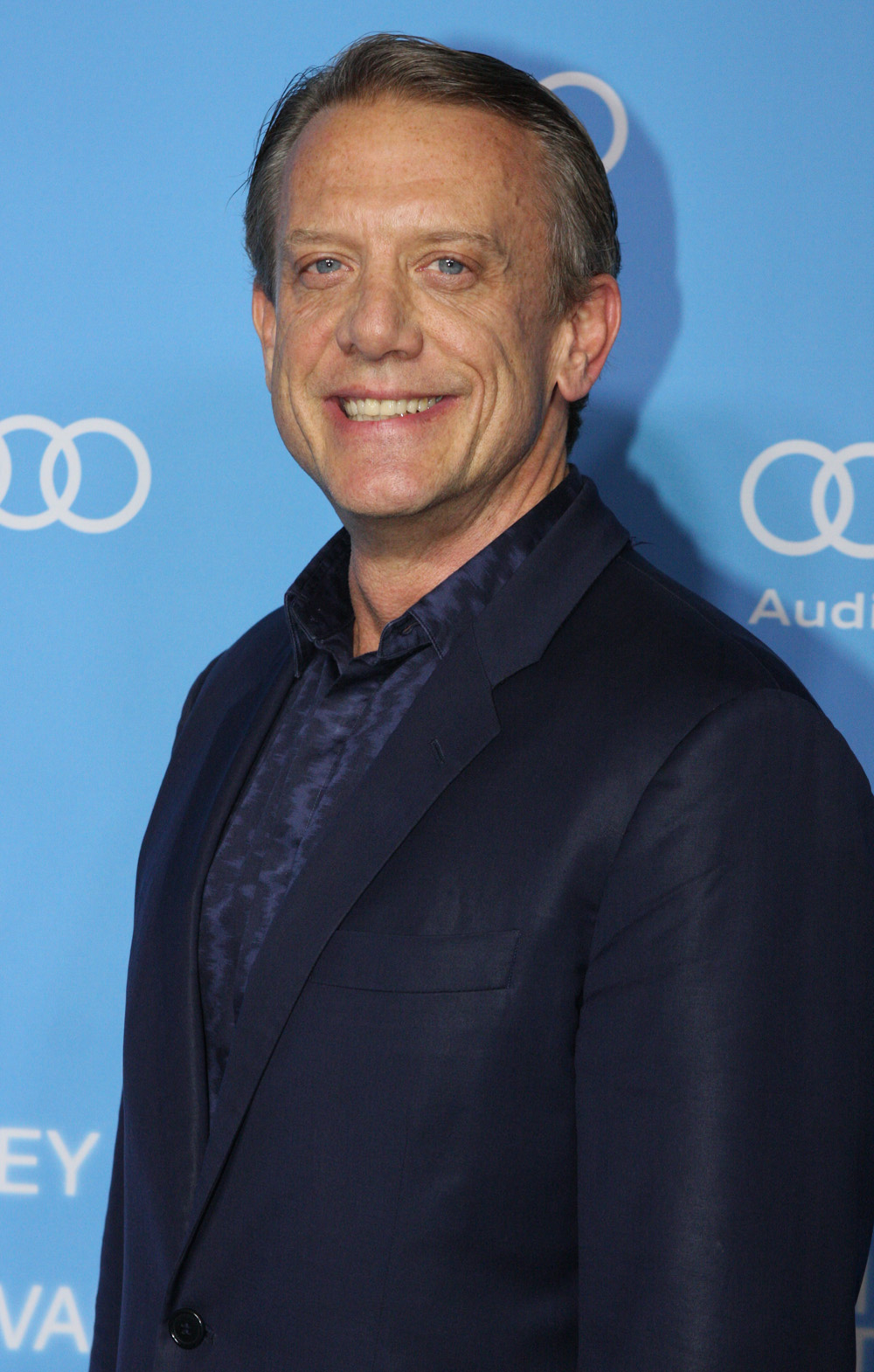
Simon Burke has hosted the awards seven times, more than any other person.

| Date^{[A]} | Host/Hosts | Network | Venue | Ref. |
|---|---|---|---|---|
| 25 March 2001 | Simon Burke | —N/a | Lyric Theatre | |
| 6 May 2002 | Simon Burke | —N/a | Star City Show Room | |
| 19 May 2003 | Simon Burke | —N/a | Star City Show Room | |
| 9 August 2004 | Simon Burke | Ovation | Lyric Theatre | |
| 8 August 2005 | Simon Burke | Ovation | Lyric Theatre | |
| 31 July 2006 | Simon Burke | Fox8 | Lyric Theatre | |
| 6 August 2007 | Jonathan Biggins | Bio. | Capitol Theatre | |
| 28 July 2008 | Jonathan Biggins and Julia Zemiro | Bio. | Lyric Theatre | |
| 27 July 2009 | Jonathan Biggins and Julia Zemiro | Bio. | Sydney Opera House | |
| 6 September 2010 | David Campbell | Studio | Sydney Opera House | |
| 1 August 2011 | Jonathan Biggins | Studio | Sydney Opera House | |
| 24 September 2012 | Simon Burke | Studio | Sydney Opera House | |
| 29 July 2013 | Eddie Perfect and Christie Whelan-Browne | Arena | Sydney Opera House | |
| 18 August 2014 | Jonathan Biggins | Arena | Capitol Theatre | |
| 27 July 2015 | Todd McKenney | Foxtel Arts | Capitol Theatre | |
| 25 July 2016 | Helen Dallimore, Guy Noble, Simon Philips, Queenie van de Zandt and The Umbilical Brothers | Foxtel Arts | Lyric Theatre | |
| 24 July 2017 | Jan van de Stool and Tim Draxl | Foxtel Arts | Capitol Theatre, Sydney | |
| 15 & 16 July 2018 | Glenn A Baker AM, Rafael Bonachela, David Campbell, Jacqueline Dark, Anne Edmonds and Tony Sheldon | ABC | Capitol Theatre, Sydney | |
| 14 & 15 July 2019 | Susie Youssef and Mitchell Butel | ABC | Arts Centre Melbourne | |
| 2020 and 2021 | Cancelled due to the COVID-19 pandemic | —N/a | | |
| 2022 and 2023 | Event did not occur | —N/a | | |

^{^[A]} Each year is linked to the full list of winners and nominees from that year following the ceremony.
