= Kim Gavin =

British director, choreographer, and former ballet dancer

Kim Gavin is a British director, choreographer, and former ballet dancer. He was the creative director of the 2012 Summer Olympics and Paralympics closing ceremonies.

Kim Gavin is the son of a plumber from Ilford in East London. He was brought up in Bournemouth. He and his wife live in Surrey and have four children; Hannah, the eldest, is following her father's footsteps training at Laine Theatre Arts. Kim Gavin trained at the Royal Ballet School. He followed a career as a dancer on television and in the theatre.

In 1997 Gavin directed and choreographed the musical Oh! What A Night.

In 2002 he choreographed the West End musical 125th Street. He is currently artistic director for Take That's live performances and has been since 1992.

He directed the Concert for Diana at Wembley Stadium in 2007 and the Help for Heroes concert at Twickenham Stadium in 2010.
