= Opera Queensland =

Opera Queensland is an opera company based in Brisbane, Queensland. The company was founded with funding from the Queensland State Government in 1981 under the name Lyric Opera of Queensland after the Queensland Opera Company was closed in December 1980.

Opera Queensland is the state’s major creator of opera and music theatre, and delivers opera productions and related projects including three mainstage productions annually at the Queensland Performing Arts Centre (QPAC).

Based in Brisbane the company presents works throughout the state.

== History ==
For the first two years of operation (1982–1983) the Lyric Opera of Queensland performed at Her Majesty's Theatre in Brisbane. The first production, Gilbert and Sullivan's Iolanthe, opened on 31 July 1982. In 1985, the Lyric Opera moved its productions to the newly opened Queensland Performing Arts Centre, where it continues to present its main stage productions each year.

In 1996 the company changed its name to Opera Queensland and moved its offices and rehearsal studio into new, purpose-built premises in South Bank that it shares with Queensland Conservatorium Griffith University.

== Funding ==
Opera Queensland is funded by the Queensland Government, the Federal Government through Australia Council for the Arts, corporate sponsors, major philanthropists and private donors.
