= Steven Heathcote =

Australian ballet dancer

- Born: Steven Anthony Heathcote; 16 October 1964 (age 62); Wagin, Western Australia
- Occupation: Ballet dancer
- Years active: 1980–2007
- Spouse: Kathy née Reid
- Children: 2

Steven Anthony Heathcote AM (born 16 October 1964, in Wagin, Western Australia) is a former Australian ballet dancer. Heathcote spent twenty-four years dancing with The Australian Ballet, twenty of them as a principal artist. He has received three Helpmann Awards, two Mo Awards and an Australian Dance Award for "Outstanding Performance by an Individual". On Australia Day (26 January) 1991 Heathcote was appointed a Member of the Order of Australia, General Division, for "service to ballet".

== Biography ==
Heathcote was born in Wagin, Western Australia on 16 October 1964, the second of four children. He was educated at Wesley College in South Perth. He was schooled in ballet by Shelley Rae and Kira Bousloff. In 1980 he obtained a scholarship with West Australian Ballet Company and the following year he was accepted into Australian Ballet School in Melbourne. Heathcote joined The Australian Ballet in 1983 and in 1987 was appointed as their principal artist. Heathcote danced for a season with the American Ballet Theatre in 1992, and has also guested with the Royal Danish Ballet and the Birmingham Royal Ballet.

Heathcote retired from the Australian Ballet in 2007 and then worked as a ballet coach, occasionally performing character roles. In 2010 he directed a production of Handel's Julius Caesar, for the Victorian Opera. In 2012 he choreographed their production of Stravinsky's The Rake’s Progress. He is a peer of Paul Mercurio, Greg Horsman and David McAllister.

Heathcote appeared in the 1994 film, Nutcracker: The Story of Clara, and in the 2009 feature film, Mao's Last Dancer. He also appeared in the Australian teen-oriented television drama, Dance Academy (2010).

=== Personal life ===
In 1984 Heathcote danced Lensky in The Australian Ballet's production of John Cranko's Onegin with Olga portrayed by Kathy Reid (born ca. 1958). He explained, "I think that had something to do with us getting together, playing the young lovers." Initially Heathcote was a boarder at Reid's house, before they became romantically involved. The couple married in 1991 and have two children.

Their daughter, Mia Heathcote (born 1996), is also a ballet dancer; she trained at The Australian Ballet School from 2010 and in January 2014 joined the Queensland Ballet as a company dancer, rising to principal artist. She joined The Australian Ballet in January 2024.

== Awards ==
=== Mo Awards ===
The Australian Entertainment Mo Awards (commonly known informally as the Mo Awards), were annual Australian entertainment industry awards. They recognised achievements in live entertainment in Australia from 1975 to 2016. Steven Heathcote won two awards in that time.

Year	Nominee / work	Award	Result (wins only)
1994	Steven Heathcote	Dance Performer of the Year	Won
2002	Steven Heathcote	Dance Performer/ Choreographer of the Year	Won
