= State Opera of South Australia =

Opera company in South Australia

State Opera South Australia (SOSA) is a professional opera company in Adelaide, South Australia, established in 1976.

== History ==
State Opera South Australia was established in 1976 as a statutory corporation under the State Opera of South Australia Act 1976, an initiative of Don Dunstan. The board created by this act reported to Arts SA (later Arts South Australia) from 1993 to 2018, when it started reporting directly to the Department of the Premier and Cabinet.

Its aim is to "present, produce, manage and conduct operatic performances that attract a diverse local, national and, potentially, international audience."

Its artistic director and CEO from 2011 until 2017 was Timothy Sexton before his "shock resignation" following charges of abuse of teenage girls for which he was sentenced to a maximum of 14 years in prison. Artistic director Stuart Maunder and executive director Yarmila Alfonzetti commenced in early 2018, and their first annual program was announced in September 2018.

In September 2022, Mark Taylor was appointed as Executive Director joining the company from Opera Queensland, a company he served for 12 years, leaving his role as the Director of Learning, Regional and Community.

In 2022, the company created the Australian Opera Digital Library where a selection of operas, curated by Stuart Maunder, by Australian composers are available for free to registered users.

== Notable productions ==
- Two complete cycles of Wagner's Der Ring des Nibelungen: the Théâtre du Châtelet (Paris) production in 1998, and in 2004 Elke Neidhardt's all-Australian production
- 2010 world premiere co-production of Moby-Dick by Jake Heggie between Dallas Opera, State Opera of South Australia, San Diego Opera, San Francisco Opera and Calgary Opera
- Australian premieres of John Adams' Nixon in China and El Niño; Jonathan Dove's Flight, and Sergei Prokofiev's The Fiery Angel
- Australian premiere of György Ligeti's opera Le Grand Macabre at the 2010 Adelaide Festival of Arts
- World premiere of George Palmer's opera based on Tim Winton's novel Cloudstreet in 2016
- Australian premiere of Barrie Kosky's production of Saul at the 2017 Adelaide Festival in association with Glyndebourne Festival Opera and Adelaide Festival of Arts
- Australian premiere of Brett Dean's Hamlet at the 2018 Adelaide Festival in association with Glyndebourne Festival Opera and Adelaide Festival of Arts
- A festival celebrating Gilbert & Sullivan in May 2023, the first to be held in the Southern Hemisphere

== Awards and nominations ==
=== ARIA Music Awards ===
The ARIA Music Awards is an annual awards ceremony held by the Australian Recording Industry Association. They commenced in 1987.

Year	Nominee / work	Award	Result	Ref.
2007	Wagner: Das Rheingold (with Adelaide Symphony Orchestra & Asher Fisch)	Best Classical Album	Nominated	
