= Saturn's Return =

Play written by Tommy Murphy

Saturn's Return is an Australian play by Tommy Murphy, first performed in 2008 in Sydney.

== Synopsis ==
Zara, the heroine of the play, is happily settled in a relationship with her partner, Matt. Marriage, mortgages and midwives lie on the horizon. Then, as the big planet does its thing, doubt creeps into Zara's mind. She must decide whether to continue on the path of the three Ms or break free from the constraints of rational living.

Tommy Murphy wrote about his thoughts on the themes of the play, "What is this final call to adulthood likely to do to my generation? Will it just be about gathering debt, finding a comfortable home in which to breed and finding time to edit the friends list on Facebook?".

The title refers to a Saturn return.

== Productions ==
The play was commissioned for the Sydney Theatre Company 2008 season by incoming co-artistic directors Cate Blanchett and Andrew Upton. Saturn's Return, written by Playwright Tommy Murphy, is published by Currency Press.

The project is from the writer-director team behind Holding the Man and Strangers in Between. It opened at Wharf 2 Theatre, Walsh Bay, NSW, 15 August 2008 with a later season Wharf 1, Sydney, NSW, 24 July 2009.

A revised version of the play and production, from the same team, opened at Sydney Theatre Company's Wharf 1 theatre on 29 July 2009.

=== Creative team ===
2008 production

- Director David Berthold
- Designer Adam Gardnir
- Lighting Designer Luiz Pampolha
- Sound Designer/Composer Basil Hogios
- Cast Matt Zeremes, Leeanna Walsman, Socratis Otto

2009 revised version

- Cast Toby Moore, Leeanna Walsman and Matt Zeremes.

== Reviews ==
In his review of the 2008 production Stephen Dunne called the play,

..well-made and thought-through play and production, very much about real and modern concerns ... Growing up, or not, is the point celebrated, delayed, mythologised and avoided in this psychologically deft and satisfying work. It's a fantastical drama about a very real moment: when each individual works out that no, this is your one-shot life, and there's a reason most of those younger hopes and fantasies are labelled "dreams.

In Australian Stage reviewer Alekskei Wechter writes that, "The nuances of each character are fleshed out which can only be contributed to a strong collaboration between the actors, director and writer."

The production returned in 2009. The original 2008 production was presented through STC's experimental arm but was now a main stage production. Alex Lalak wrote that, "... with a tweak of the script and a more solid design concept, it has developed more gravity but retained plenty of sparkle ... It makes an interesting addition to a growing list of locally produced shows telling local stories with a sense of humour."

"This production by David Berthold is a tense affair, all snappy dialogue and pithy black humor." writes Nic Connaughton. "It's a generally solid affair but there are a few weaknesses, with the play promising so much but ultimately leaving you feeling that the sum of all its parts has not really added up to achieve the kind of emotional catharsis that Murphy's work is noted for ... an intriguing and beguiling outing by some of the Australia's most exciting talent.
