= Holding the Man (play) =

Play by Tommy Murphy

Holding the Man is a 2006 Australian play written by Tommy Murphy, based on Tim Conigrave's memoir of the same title. It premiered in Sydney, where it won several awards, and then across Australia, as well as internationally–on London's West End and in Los Angeles.

== Productions ==
The original production, directed by David Berthold, premiered in 2006 in a critically acclaimed, sold-out season at Sydney's Griffin Theatre Company. It became the company's highest-grossing production in its 30-year history.

The production played six, highly successful seasons in various theatres around Australia:

- Griffin Theatre Company, 3 November – 23 December 2006
- Griffin Theatre Company, 7 February – 3 March 2007
- Sydney Opera House, 9–26 May 2007
- Company B at Sydney's Belvoir St Theatre, 22 September – 4 November 2007
- Brisbane Powerhouse, 5–9 March 2008
- Melbourne Theatre Company as part of its 2008 subscription season, 14 March – 26 April 2008

The production was remounted at La Boite Theatre Company with a new cast, 16 February – 9 March 2013.

The 2014 key poster art for the Australian Theater Company's Los Angeles production of Holding the Man

=== West End (London) season ===
This original Australian production was recreated in London's West End for a limited season from 23 April to 3 July 2010. The cast included Jane Turner, (Kath from TV's Kath & Kim), and Simon Burke. David Berthold directed and Brian Thomson designed the sets, with costumes and puppets by Micka Agosta.

The Trafalgar Studios season was produced by Daniel Sparrow and Mike Walsh, Matthew Henderson and Suzie Franke, Benjamin Jones and Neil Gooding Productions.

The production was nominated for Best Play and Berthold was nominated for Best Direction of a Play in the BroadwayWorld UK Awards.

=== Other productions ===
The North American premiere of Holding the Man was staged by San Francisco's New Conservatory Theater Center, 21 September – 4 November 2007.

A New Zealand production was produced by Silo Theatre (at Auckland's Herald Theatre, Aotea Centre) from 7–29 August 2009, directed by Shane Bosher.

The State Theatre Company of South Australia production ran from 21 October to 13 November 2011 at the Dunstan Playhouse, Adelaide Festival Centre, directed by Rosalba Clemente and starring Nic English, Luke Clayson, Catherine Fitzgerald, Nick Pelomis, Geoff Revell, and Ellen Steele. It was designed by Morag Cook, composed by Stuart Day, with lighting design by Mark Shelton and puppets created by Stephanie Fisher.

In 2019, Holding The Man was presented for the first time in New York, as a benefit reading for Gay Men's Health Crisis starring Greg Ramsey and Charlie Munday directed by Andrew Victor Myers and Morgan Bartholick.

=== Los Angeles season ===
The Australian Theatre Company presented their production in Los Angeles in May/June 2014 at the Matrix Theater with Larry Moss directing. The production was met with much fanfare with a launch hosted by the Australian Consul General in Los Angeles. The cast featured Nate Jones, Adam J. Yeend, Cameron Daddo, and Roxane Wilson.

== Awards for stage version ==
- Winner, 2005 Philip Parsons Young Playwrights Award
- Winner, 2007 New South Wales Premier's Literary Awards, Best Play
- Winner, 2007 Australian Writers' Guild Award (AWGIE), Best Play
- Nomination, 2007 Helpmann Award for Best Play
- Nomination, 2007 Sydney Theatre Awards, Best New Australian Work
- Nomination, 2007 Queensland Premier's Literary Awards, Best Play
- Judges' citation, NSW Premier's Literary Award for Best Play

== Publication ==
The stage version was published by Currency Press in November 2006 in a double volume with another play by Murphy, Strangers in Between. A new edition of the play was published in April 2010 by Nick Hern Books in the UK to coincide with the London season of the production.

== Creative teams ==
=== Original Australian creative team ===
- Director: David Berthold
- Designer: Brian Thomson
- Costume Designer: Micka Agosta
- Lighting Designer: Stephen Hawker
- Composer & Sound Designer: Basil Hogios
- Associate Sound Designer: Steve Toulmin
- Assistant Director: Nic Dorward
- Timothy Conigrave: Guy Edmonds
- John Caleo: Matthew Zeremes
- Mary-Gert Conigrave and various: Jeanette Cronin
- Dick Conigrave and various: Nicholas Eadie
- Phoebe and various: Robin McLeavy
- Peter Craig and various: Brett Stiller

=== London creative team ===
- Director: David Berthold
- Designer: Brian Thomson
- Costumes and puppets: Micka Agosta
- Lighting Designer: James Whiteside
- Composer & Original Sound Designer: Basil Hogios
- UK Sound Designer: Avgoustos Psillas
- Associate Director: Adam Spreadbury-Maher
- Associate Designer: Morgan Large
- Timothy Conigrave: Guy Edmonds
- John Caleo: Matthew Zeremes

=== New Zealand creative team ===
- Director: Shane Bosher
- Set Designer: Rachael Walker
- Costume Designer: Elizabeth Whiting
- Lighting Designer: Jeremy Fern
- Composer & Sound Designer: Andrew McMillan
- Timothy Conigrave: Dan Musgrove
- John Caleo: Charlie McDermott
- Mary-Gert Conigrave, Lois Caleo and various: Alison Bruce
- Dick Conigrave, Bob Caleo and various: Andrew Laing
- Phoebe and various: Michelle Blundell
- Peter Craig, Biscuit, Kevin and various: Matt Whelan
