= Tommy Murphy (Australian playwright) =

Australian playwright

- Born: 1979 (age 46–47); Queanbeyan, New South Wales, Australia
- Occupations: Playwright and screen writer
- Writing career
- Notable works: Troy's House, Holding the Man, Strangers in Between, Gwen in Purgatory and Mark Colvin's Kidney

Tommy Murphy (born 1979) is an Australian playwright, screenwriter, adaptor and director . He created and was head writer for the 2022 TV series Significant Others. He is best known for his stage and screen adaptation of Timothy Conigrave's memoir Holding the Man. His most recent plays are a stage adaptation of Nevil Shute’s On The Beach, Mark Colvin's Kidney and Packer & Sons.

== Early life ==
Murphy was born in Queanbeyan, New South Wales, Australia, the seventh of eight children in a Catholic family. Murphy attended St Edmund's College, Canberra. He is a graduate of the University of Sydney (BA 2004) and of the National Institute of Dramatic Art (Director's course).

== Career ==
He was a resident writer at Griffin Theatre Company 2004–06, for which he wrote Strangers in Between and Holding the Man. Both plays are published by Currency Press, in one volume. Strangers in Between won the national 2006 NSW Premier's Literary Award for Best Play, and Holding the Man won the same Award in 2007. Murphy is the youngest recipient of the award, and the only playwright to win in successive years.

Holding the Man had an encore season at Griffin before transferring to Sydney Opera House, Belvoir, Melbourne Theatre Company and Brisbane's Powerhouse. It played London's West End from 23 April to 3 July 2010. Guy Edmonds and Matt Zeremes were joined by new cast members Jane Turner and Simon Burke. David Berthold directed and Brian Thomson designed. The Trafalgar Studios season was produced by Daniel Sparrow and Mike Walsh. The play has been produced every year since its premiere with new productions in San Francisco, Auckland, Adelaide and encore productions in Brisbane and Sydney. In 2014 the play was also mounted in Los Angeles by The Australian Theatre Company with Larry Moss directing; Nate Jones, Adam J. Yeend, Cameron Daddo, and Roxanne Wilson were cast for the production.

Saturn's Return was commissioned by Sydney Theatre Company co-artistic directors Andrew Upton and Cate Blanchett for STC's Wharf 2 season 2008. In 2009 it transferred to the STC main stage. Saturn's Return is published by Currency Press.

Murphy's award-winning play, Gwen in Purgatory, was co-produced by Belvoir and La Boite Theatre and directed by Neil Armfield in 2010. The cast for this premiere production were Nathaniel Dean, Grant Dodwell, Sue Ingleton, Melissa Jaffer and Pacharo Mzembe. This play is also published by Currency Press.

He was writer-in-residence at Belvoir 2011–2012. His adaptation of Blood Wedding was commissioned for the London 2012 Olympiad and his reworking of Peter Pan for Belvoir transferred to New York in 2013.

After the multi-production international success of the stage play of Holding the Man, Murphy initiated the screen project. He partnered with executive producer Cameron Huang, producer Kylie Du Fresne of Goalpost Pictures, producers of The Sapphires and director Neil Armfield to see the film to fruition in 2015. It opened to strong domestic box office in Australia and is released globally via Netflix after an international cinema release. Murphy wrote the screenplay and worked as associate producer for the film.

Murphy's screen credits include teleplays for Offspring, Spirited, and Matchbox's 2014 Foxtel mini-series Devil's Playground.

Murphy is the recipient of a Centenary Medal and the British Council Realise Your Dream Award. In 2007, he had the title of honorary associate conferred by the Faculty of Education & Social Work, University of Sydney. He also sat on the board of directors of the Australian Theatre for Young People 2005–2010.

Murphy was commissioned to write a play for Black Swan State Theatre Company as recipient (joint) of the Richard Burton Award 2012, which carried $15,000 prizemoney . He is also currently writing for Belvoir Theatre as well as developing a number of screen projects. Murphy is the 2016 University of Queensland Drama Creative Fellow.

The Sydney Theatre Company has awarded Murphy the 2015 Patrick White Fellowship, worth $25.000. The gives the playwright a commission and 12 months work at the company. Each year the fellowship is awarded to an established playwright and Murphy said of the fellowship that it, "offers a sense of belonging to a pursuit that is often solitary."

In 2021 ABC Television commissioned Murphy to write a psychological drama series called Significant Others . The series, which was directed by Tony Krawitz, went to air from 16 October 2022.

Murphy won best For Audio – Fiction, for his radio play Call You Back as part of the Untrue Romance series at the AWGIE Awards 2022.

== Plays ==
Plays as listed on AusStage

Playwright

- Operation Marlowe, Newtown Theatre, Newtown, NSW, 9 March 2001
- Kinderspiel - Out of Bounds, The Studio (Sydney Opera House), Sydney, NSW, 5 January 2002
- Two-Up!, Bowlers' Club of NSW, Sydney, NSW, 7 January 2002
- Bendy, ATYP Studio 1, The Wharf, Walsh Bay, NSW, 5 July 2002; Performance Space, Wollongong, NSW, 11 September 2002
- 360 Positions In A One Night Stand, Arts House Meat Market, North Melbourne, VIC, 2 October 2002; The Store Room, North Fitzroy, VIC, 29 July 2003; Annexe Theatre, Launceston, TAS, 2004; The Ausdance Studio, Adelaide, SA, 9 March 2004
- Kings X Stories, Stables Theatre, Darlinghurst, NSW, 9 October 2003
- Troy's House, Carlton Courthouse, Carlton, VIC, 1 February 2005 (and Director); ATYP Studio 1, The Wharf, Walsh Bay, NSW, 11 October 1999
- Holding the Man, Stables Theatre, Darlinghurst, NSW, 3 November 2006; StablesTheatre, Darlinghurst, NSW, 8 February 2007; Playhouse (Sydney Opera House), Sydney, NSW, 9 May 2007; Belvoir Street Theatre, Surry Hills, NSW, 22 September 2007; Brisbane Powerhouse, New Farm, QLD, 5 March 2008; Merlyn Theatre, Southbank, VIC, 14 March 2008; Dunstan Playhouse, Adelaide, SA, 21 October 2011; Roundhouse Theatre, Kelvin Grove, QLD, 16 February 2013, Belvoir 2024
- Strangers in Between, The Q, Queanbeyan, NSW, 6 May 2008; Glen Street Theatre, Frenchs Forest, NSW, 13 May 2008; Stables Theatre, Darlinghurst, NSW, 11 February 2005
- Saturn's Return, Wharf 2 Theatre, Walsh Bay, NSW, 15 August 2008; Wharf 1, Sydney, NSW, 24 July 2009
- Rough Draft #3, Wharf 2 Theatre, Walsh Bay, NSW, 5 September 2009
- Gwen In Purgatory, Belvoir Street Theatre, Surry Hills, NSW, 31 July 2010; Roundhouse Theatre, Kelvin Grove, QLD, 29 September 2010
- Mark Colvin's Kidney, Belvoir Street Theatre, Surry Hills, NSW, 25 February 2017
- Packer & Sons, Belvoir Street Theatre, Surry Hills, NSW, 20 November 2019
- On The Beach, Sydney Theatre Company, July 2023

Adaptor

- The Massacre of Paris, TYP Studio 1, The Wharf, Walsh Bay, NSW, 2001
- Blood Wedding, Cultural Olympiad's London May 2012 Festival
- Peter Pan, Belvoir Street Theatre, Surry Hills, NSW, 5 January 2013

Director

- The Crucible, The Cellar, Camperdown, NSW, 28 March 2001
- NIDA Directors' Plays 2004 Program A, NIDA Studio, Kensington, NSW, 1 December 2004
- Speedy Mustard, Stables Theatre, Darlinghurst, NSW, 25 April 2006
- Three Little Fears, Old Fitzroy Hotel Theatre, Woolloomooloo, NSW, 9 July 2006
- Double Exposure, Belvoir Street Downstairs Theatre, Surry Hills, NSW, 5 January 2010

Assistant Director

- Stuff Happens, York Theatre, Chippendale, NSW, 21 July 2005; Comedy Theatre, Melbourne, VIC, 24 August 2005

== Films/TV ==
Writer

- Spirited, 2011 TV series, writer 1 episode
- Offspring, 2012 TV series, writer 1 episode
- Devil's Playground, 2014 TV miniseries, writer 2 episodes
- Holding the Man, 2015 film, screenplay
- Fighting Season, 2017 TV miniseries, writer 1 episode
- The Twelve, 2022 TV Series
- Significant Others, 2022 TV series, all 6 episodes

Producer

- Holding the Man, 2015 film, associate producer

== Awards ==
- Winner, Sydney Theatre Company Young Playwright's Award – For God, Queen & Country.
- Winner, ACT Young Playwright's Award – For God, Queen and Country
- Nomination, Best New Australian Work, 2005 Sydney Theatre Awards – Strangers in Between
- Winner, 2006 New South Wales Premier's Literary Awards, Best Play – Strangers in Between
- Nomination, Best New Australian Work, 2006 Sydney Theatre Awards – Holding the Man
- Nomination, 2006 Australian Writers' Guild Award (AWGIE) for Best Play – Strangers in Between
- Winner, 2007 New South Wales Premier's Literary Awards, Best Play – Holding the Man
- Winner, 2007 Australian Writers' Guild Award (AWGIE), Best Play – Holding the Man
- Winner, 2007 Aussietheatre.com Online Awards, Best New Play, Holding the Man
- Winner, 2007 Philip Parsons Young Playwrights Award
- Nomination, 2007 Helpmann Award for Best Play – Holding the Man
- Nomination, Best Play, 2007 Queensland Premier's Literary Awards – Holding the Man
- Winner British Council Realise Your Dream Award
- Winner 2010 WA Premier's Literary Awards, Best Play – Gwen in Purgatory
- Winner 2012 Richard Burton Award – Gwen in Purgatory
- Winner 2015 The Patrick White Playwrights’ Fellowship
- Shortlisted 2021 Nick Enright Prize for Playwriting, NSW Premier's Literary Awards
