= Timothy Conigrave =

Australian actor, activist and author

- Born: Timothy Fairfax Conigrave; 19 November 1959; Melbourne, Victoria, Australia
- Died: 18 October 1994 (aged 34); Sydney, New South Wales, Australia
- Cause of death: AIDS-related illness
- Education: National Institute of Dramatic Art (BFA)
- Notable work: Holding the Man
- Partner: John Caleo (1980 – 1992; Caleo's death)

Tim Conigrave (19 November 1959 – 18 October 1994) was an Australian actor, activist and author of the internationally acclaimed memoir, Holding the Man.

== Education and career ==
Conigrave was born in Melbourne, and attended the Jesuit-run Xavier College, and later Monash University, where he appeared in Bertolt Brecht's A Man's a Man and Ariane Mnouchkine's 1789. Following graduation, he worked with St Martin's Youth Arts Centre. Under the direction of Helmut Bakaitis, Alison Richards, and Val Levkowicz he performed in the touring productions of The Zig & Zag Follies, Cain's Hand and Quick-Eze Cafe. In July 1981 he performed in the Australian Performing Group's (APG) production of Bold Tales at The Pram Factory, under the direction of Peter King. Also in 1981 he worked on Edward Bond's Saved for the Guild Theatre Company and completed his first play, The Blitz Kids, which was performed at the La Mama Theatre (Adelaide) in August that year.

Conigrave later moved to Sydney to study at National Institute of Dramatic Art (NIDA), graduating in 1984. Two years later he was instrumental in initiating the acclaimed Soft Targets (1986) project at Sydney's Griffin Theatre Company, where for a period he served on the board of directors.

He appeared in such plays as Brighton Beach Memoirs, As Is, and On Top of the World. He was also a playwright, producing works including Thieving Boy, Like Stars in My Hands and The Blitz Kids.

He was a member of The Globos, a musical comedy cabaret group, performing at Sydney's Kinselas nightclub in the mid-1980s. And in the late 1980s and early 1990s he was a Peer Education Officer with the AIDS Council of NSW (ACON), running the Fun and Esteem project.

== Memoir ==
=== Book ===
His major work, the autobiographical Holding the Man (1995), is the story of his 15-year relationship with John Caleo. They met as students at Xavier College; Caleo was captain of the Australian Rules Football team and Conigrave wanted to be an actor. Conigrave finished the book shortly before dying of an AIDS-related illness. The book was published by Penguin Books in Australia in February 1995, and also in Spain and North America. It won the 1995 United Nations Award for Non-Fiction.

=== Play ===
Holding the Man has been adapted into a multi-award-winning play by Tommy Murphy. The premiere production was directed by David Berthold at Griffin Theatre Company. It later played a return season at Griffin, February – March 2007, where it also sold out, before transferring to the Sydney Opera House for a third sell-out season, 9–26 May 2007. Company B at the Belvoir St Theatre hosted a fourth season 22 September – 4 November 2007. A fifth season played at the Brisbane Powerhouse in early March 2008, with a sixth following as part of Melbourne Theatre Company's 2008 season, 19 March – 26 April 2008. In 2010 it played in London's Trafalgar Studios. There have also been productions in San Francisco, Auckland, New Zealand, and more recently a 2014 production in Los Angeles directed by Larry Moss and featuring Nate Jones, Adam J. Yeend, Cameron Daddo and Roxane Wilson, as well as a successful run in the summer of 2018 at Chicago's Pride Films and Plays.

=== Film ===
On 27 August 2015 a film version of Holding the Man opened in cinemas across Australia. The film is directed by Neil Armfield and features Ryan Corr (Tim) and Craig Stott (John).

A documentary based on the lives of Tim Conigrave and John Caleo, Remembering the Man, premiered at the Adelaide Film Festival on Sunday 18 October 2015. ArtsHub applauded the film as "powerful and engaging; a fitting tribute to Tim Conigrave, the author of an ur-text of the AIDS pandemic, and his husband, John Caleo." The Guardian said "this film goes straight (so to speak) to the gay pool room" when it placed the Remembering the Man on its list of Australia's 10 best LGBT films. FilmInk called the film a "Beautifully crafted documentary" and noted that "Despite the tragedy that is at the heart of this documentary, it, like Holding The Man, is a peculiarly uplifting and hopeful film. Operatic even. Tim would have liked that." Remembering the Man won the Audience Awards for best documentary at the Adelaide Film Festival 2015, Sydney's Mardi Gras Film Festival 2016 and the Melbourne Queer Film Festival 2016. The film also won the David McCarthy Award for best documentary at the Melbourne Queer Film Festival 2016, the jury prize for best documentary at the MiFo LGBT Festival 2016 and the award for Best Documentary (Biography) at the 2015 ATOM Awards. The documentary's directors, Nickolas Bird and Eleanor Sharpe, were nominated for best direction of a feature documentary at the 2016 Australian Director's Guild Awards.

== Theatre credits ==
=== As actor ===
Year	Title	Role	Type
	A Man's a Man		Monash University
	1789		Monash University
1980	The Zig & Zag Follies		Touring production
	Cain's Hand		Touring production
	Quick-Eze Cafe		Touring production
1981	Saved	Barry	University of Melbourne with Guild Theatre Company
1981	Bold Tales		The Pram Factory with Australian Performing Group (APG)
1983	Peer Gynt	Peer Gynt 5 / Pastor	NIDA Theatre
1983	Ivanov		NIDA Theatre
1964	Welcome the Bright World	Dr Mencken	UNSW Parade Theatre
1984	Pericles	Cienon / Fisherman	UNSW Parade Theatre, Playhouse Canberra, Community Arts Theatre, Newcastle
1984	Street Scene		UNSW Parade Theatre
1986	Brighton Beach Memoirs	Stanley	Comedy Theatre, Melbourne with The Fabulous Globos
1987	Shadowlands	Director	Bay Street Theatre
	As Is		with The Fabulous Globos
Mid-1980s	Cabaret shows		Kinselas nightclub with The Fabulous Globos

=== As writer / other ===
Year	Title	Role
1981	The Blitz Kids	Playwright
	Thieving Boy	Playwright
	Like Stars in My Hands	Playwright
1986	Soft Targets	Devisor
1986	On Top of the World	Production Coordinator
2006	Holding the Man	Author (based on Conigrave's 1995 memoir)

== Book ==
Year	Title	Type	Publisher
1995	Holding the Man	Autobiographical novel	Penguin Books

== Later life and death ==
Conigrave and Caleo were diagnosed with HIV in 1985. They remained relatively healthy until 1990. In 1991, Caleo was diagnosed with cancer. Conigrave nursed Caleo, despite fighting his own illness. John Caleo died on Australia Day, 26 January 1992, aged 31. Tim Conigrave died on 18 October 1994, aged 34.
