= Watchlist =

Watchlist or watch list may refer to:

- Watchlist (NGO), the Watchlist on Children and Armed Conflict, a non-governmental organization
- Watchlist (play), a 2021 Australian play.
- Watchlist (wiki), a tool for monitoring changes on wikis
- Interpol Terrorism Watch List, a list of fugitives and suspected terrorists

== See also ==
- Computer-Assisted Passenger Prescreening System, a watchlist maintained by the Transportation Security Administration in United States
  - Secure Flight, the successor to the Computer-Assisted Passenger Prescreening System
- No Fly List, United States list of people suspected of some involvement with terrorism
- No Fly List (India), list of people temporarily prohibited from boarding flights.
- "Priority Watch List" and a "Watch List" of the Special 301 Report
- Terrorist Screening Database (aka. Central Terrorist Watchlist), FBI's list of millions of people suspected of some involvement with terrorism
