= Strangers in Between =

2005 Australian play written by Tommy Murphy

Strangers in Between is a two-act Australian play by Tommy Murphy. It won the 2006 NSW Premier's Literary Award for Best Play. It was first staged at Sydney's Griffin Theatre Company in February 2005, where it broke box office records.

It is published by Currency Press with Murphy's stage adaptation of Timothy Conigrave's Holding the Man. It is published in the UK by Nick Hern Books.

== Synopsis ==
Strangers in Between explores brotherhood. Shane flees his family in regional Goulburn and finds himself in Sydney's Kings Cross. He attempts to build a surrogate family in the city. He confuses the two families. The city lover he worships is doubled and morphed with the brother he fears. Peter, an older man who is dealing with the imminent death of his elderly mother, is himself rendered maternal by the needs of runaway Shane.

== Reviews ==
A reviewer of the first UK performance wrote that:

Tommy Murphy’s Strangers in Between is one of the most beautifully written, achingly honest, and devastating insights into the life of a person growing up in a world that refuses to understand who that person truly is. Full of hope, raucous ribaldry, and sweet, tender moments of connection between disparate souls who eventually form a family,... It is wrapped in love, acceptance and understanding. Absolutely unmissable.

The Age describes the 2018 Melbourne revival of the play as "a three-hander exploring, with sharp humour and emotional nuance, the passions and fears of growing up gay... a story so funny and tender and wild, and so beautifully acted, that anyone might recognise and connect with it".

The Times critic in London wrote a four star review for the play. "Murphy unspools his dramatic premise neatly and with minimal contrivance, abetted by this admirably economical production’s almost ceremonially efficient scene changes. Yet what really hooks us into the people on stage is the cast’s three-dimensional grasp of character and their expertise with the rhythms of Murphy’s dialogue. Stephen Connery-Brown evinces especially crack timing as Peter, a mature male who is far more protector than predator. Dan Hunter manages the tricky task of essaying two roles – decent Will and manipulative Ben – with considerable aplomb. Pivotally, Roly Botha rides the edgy emotional rollercoaster that is Shane with a tender, bruised charm. The boy is insecure, even unstable; nervous to the point of paranoia; desperately needy and at times thoughtlessly impulsive and blunt. Yet we come to care about him. Sex, meanwhile, is treated with humorous candour. The key to understanding Murphy’s men is about much more than what they do in bed."

The Independent's critic lauded the play as deserving of its West End transfer. "...wise and witty coming-of-age play about facing fears, about friendships forged across the generations, and about making your own surrogate family. The tone combines the sharp and the sweet, the charmingly funny, the slightly rose-tinted and the completely explicit".

The original 2005 production was summed up by Sydney's Sun Herald critic Colin Rose. "…there’s an honesty and openness to Murphy's writing that is irresistibly heart-warming, an appeal which, I imagine, is pretty much universal". Sun Herald

== Details of premiere production ==
Griffin Theatre Company at the SBW Stables Theatre, Sydney, Australia.
17 February – 12 March 2005

Director: David Berthold
Designer: Alice Babidge
Lighting: Anthony Pearson

Shane – Sam Dunn
Peter – Anthony Phelan
Will/Ben – Brett Stiller

== Selected productions ==
27 – 31 May 2008 Riverside Theatre Parramatta (part of a national tour)

23 July – 16 August 2009 Store Room Theatre, North Fitzroy

1–3 August 2013 University of Wollongong

21 June – 16 July 2016 UK premiere at the King's Head Theatre.

10 January 2017 – 4 February 2017 West end transfer King's Head Theatre, Inner London New season

24 January – 11 February 2018 Forty Five Downstairs for Midsumma Festival http://www.fortyfivedownstairs.com/wp2016/event/strangers-tommy-murphy/

14 February – 2 March transfer to Seymour Centre for Mardi Gras Festival, Cameron Lukey Presents and Don't be Down Productions.

== Awards ==
- Winner, 2006 NSW Premier's Literary Award for Best Play ($15,000)
- Nomination, 2006 Australian Writers' Guild Award (AWGIE) for Best Play
