= Brian Thomson (scenic designer) =

Australian artist

- Born: 1946 (age 79–80); Australia
- Occupation: Scenic designer
- Website: brianthomson.com.au

Brian Thomson AM (b. 1946) is an Australian theatre, opera and film designer. He has been active in Australian stage design since the 1970s.

== Biography ==
Originally an architecture student, Thomson dropped out of university to become an artist, and began working in theatre after meeting director Jim Sharman in 1969. They had a long and successful work collaboration together, beginning at the Old Tote Theatre Company, before working on a series of hugely successful musical productions including the Melbourne production of Hair, and the original Australian and London productions of Jesus Christ Superstar and The Rocky Horror Show. When Sharman directed The Rocky Horror Picture Show movie based on the musical, and its sequel Shock Treatment, Thomson worked on their set design again.

Other musical credits include the Broadway production of The King and I, and Australian productions of Company, The Boy from Oz, and Priscilla: Queen of the Desert the Musical.

He has designed for all the major Australian theatre companies, with credits including Holding the Man, Keating!, The Gates of Egypt, Capricornia, Stuff Happens, Run Rabbit Run, Buried Child, My Zinc Bed, The Laramie Project, Aftershocks, The Tempest, The Master Builder and Ghosts. For Sydney Theatre Company, where he was Associate Director in 1981, Thomson has designed for productions of Chicago, Festen, The Ham Funeral, Coriolanus, King Lear, The Real Thing, The One Day of the Year, Up for Grabs, The White Devil, A Cheery Soul, The Doll Trilogy, Arcadia, and Steel City. In 1982 he directed and designed The Stripper, which opened Sydney Theatre Company's second venue Kinsela Theatre. The new musical was adapted from the novel by Carter Brown.

Thomson has designed opera for Opera Australia, Welsh National Opera, the English National Opera, the Royal Opera, London, and for films including The Rocky Horror Picture Show, Starstruck, Rebel, and Ground Zero. In 1983 he made his film directing debut with the short Night of Shadows, based on The Shadow Knows a short play he had staged the previous year.

He also designed sets for tours by Kylie Minogue, floats for the 2012 Mardi Gras, and was supervising designer for Sydney 2000 Olympic Games Closing Ceremony, the 2001 Centenary of Federation Ceremony, the 2003 Rugby World Cup Opening Ceremony, and the Closing Ceremony of the 2006 Melbourne Commonwealth Games. His archives are held by Australian Performing Arts Collection.

== Awards ==
In 1985 and 1987 he won an AFI for Best Achievement in Production Design, after being nominated in 1982 and 1984.

In 1996 he won a Tony Award for Best Scenic Design and Drama Desk Award for Outstanding Set Design for The King and I.

In 2007 he won a Helpmann Award for Best Design for The Boy from Oz.

In 2005 Thomson received an Order of Australia, AM, for services to the arts.

In 2016 he won Best Stage Design for Faith Healer at the Sydney Theatre Awards, and received their Lifetime Achievement Award in 2017.

In 2019 National Institute of Dramatic Art awarded him an honorary degree of Master of Fine Arts.

=== Mo Awards ===
The Australian Entertainment Mo Awards (commonly known informally as the Mo Awards), were annual Australian entertainment industry awards. They recognise achievements in live entertainment in Australia from 1975 to 2016. Brian Thomson won two awards in that time.

Year	Nominee / work	Award	Result (wins only)
1993	Brian Thomson	Outstanding Contribution to Musical Theatre	Won
1994	Brian Thomson	Outstanding Contribution to Musical Theatre	Won
