= Ryan Corr =

Australian actor (born 1989)

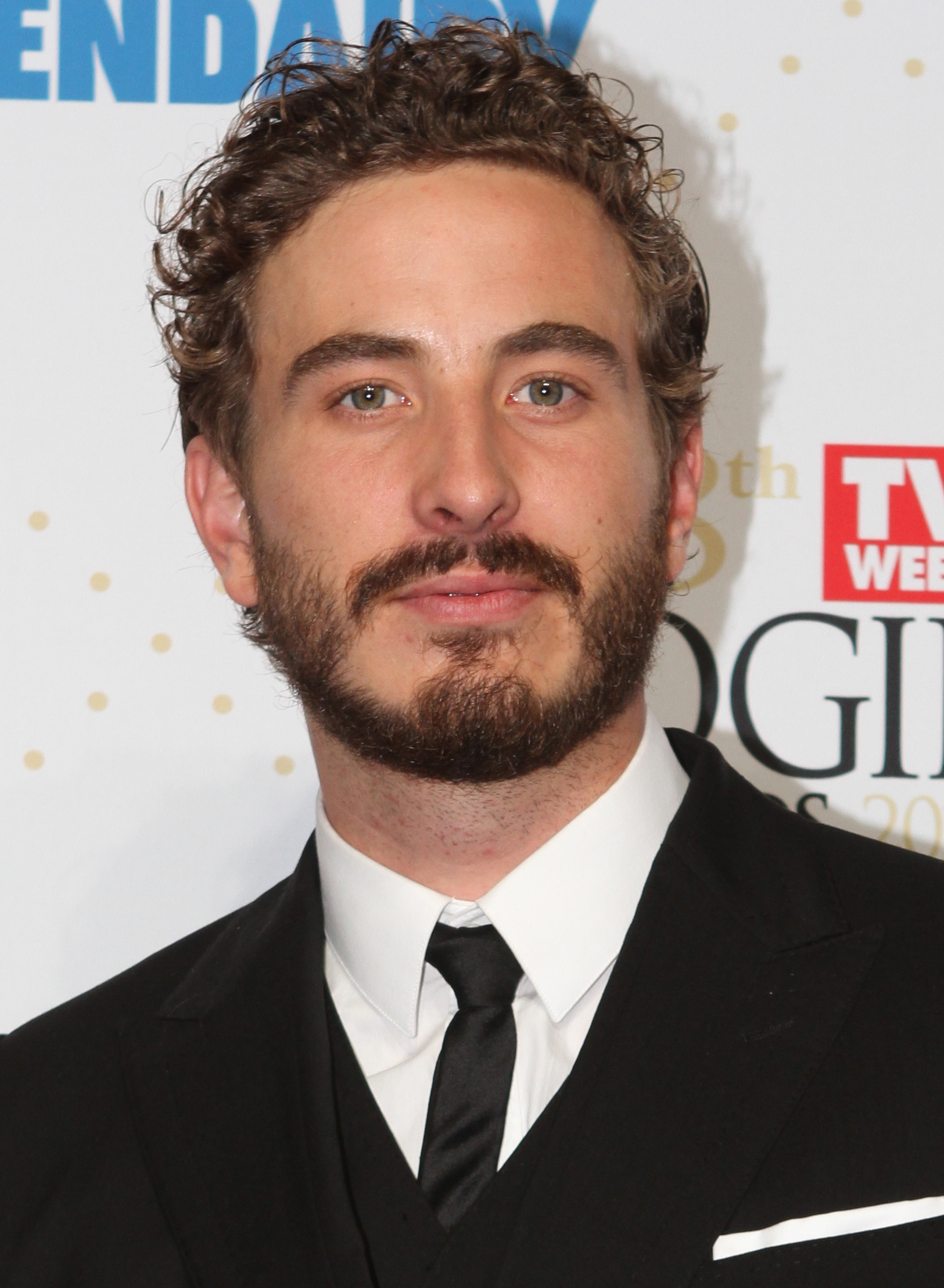
- Corr attending the May 2016 TV Week Logie Awards
- Born: 15 January 1989 (age 37); Melbourne, Victoria, Australia
- Education: National Institute of Dramatic Art (BFA) (2009)
- Occupation: Actor
- Years active: 2003–present
- Known for: Packed to the Rafters; Love Child; The Water Diviner (2014); Holding the Man (2015)

Ryan Corr is an Australian actor. He is known for his roles in the Australian drama series Packed to the Rafters, Love Child and Underbelly, along with film roles in Wolf Creek 2 (2013), The Water Diviner (2014), Holding the Man (2015), as well as the Game of Thrones prequel House of the Dragon.

== Early life ==
Corr was born in Melbourne. His father is Peter Corr, the head coach of the Australian women's goalball team.

In 2009, he graduated from the National Institute of Dramatic Art (NIDA).

== Career ==
He began making appearances in film and television from the age of five, but started his acting career in earnest at age thirteen with the film Opraholic. His first television performance was on The Sleepover Club with a supporting role as Matthew McDougal. Following this, he landed a lead role as Sheng Zamett on Silversun (2004).

Soon after, Corr had guest appearances on shows such as Scooter: Secret Agent, Blue Heelers, and Neighbours. As a voice actor, he voiced a sheep in Charlotte's Web. In 2006, the second series of Blue Water High aired on Australian TV in which Corr starred as young surfer Eric, one of the six chosen teens to attend Solar Blue. In 2010, Corr appeared in the final few episodes of Underbelly: The Golden Mile as Michael Kanaan.

From 2009 until 2013, Corr was a regular character on the Australian television show Packed to the Rafters, playing Dave Rafter's nephew Coby Jennings. He quit the show in order to pursue acting work in the United States. He also appeared in the romantic comedy Not Suitable for Children alongside Ryan Kwanten. In 2013, he appeared in the teen thriller film 6 Plots, and starred alongside John Jarratt in Wolf Creek 2, the 2013 sequel to the horror film Wolf Creek.

In 2015, Corr starred in Neil Armfield's romantic-drama film Holding the Man, adapted from Timothy Conigrave's 1995 memoir of the same name. He portrayed Conigrave opposite Craig Stott who portrayed Conigrave's partner, John Caleo.

In 2016, he starred in the television series Wanted.

Corr appeared as Joseph in Helen Edmundson's 2018 film Mary Magdalene.

In 2022, he had a recurring role in HBO's House of the Dragon as Ser Harwin Strong.

In 2024, Corr was named for feature film Kangaroo. On 25 August 2025, Corr was named as lead for the film Her Aussie Romance. On 13 January 2026, Corr was announced as part of the cast for season two of High Country.

== Legal issues ==
In May 2014, Corr was charged with heroin possession after being found with a freezer bag holding 0.26g (less than 1/100 of an ounce) of the drug in the Sydney suburb of Bondi. After admitting to the possession, the actor was given a 12-month good behaviour bond with no conviction recorded.

Corr later stated, "I found myself in a position where I was incredibly upset, someone offered me something and 200 metres after, I was picked up with it. It was an error of judgment."

== Filmography ==
=== Film ===
| Year | Title | Role | Type |
|---|---|---|---|
| 2003 | Opraholic | Simon Roberts | Short film |
| 2007 | Piranha | Andy | Short film |
| 2009 | Where the Wild Things Are | Claire's friend | |
| 2010 | Before the Rain | Max | |
| 2010 | Violet | Max | Short film |
| 2011 | Blue Monday | Ryan | Short film |
| 2012 | Not Suitable for Children | Gus | Feature film |
| 2013 | 6 Plots | Marty Pollock | |
| 2013 | The 8 Inch Pinch | Constance Raymond | Short film |
| 2013 | Wolf Creek 2 | Paul Hammersmith | |
| 2014 | The Water Diviner | Arthur Connor | |
| 2015 | Holding the Man | Timothy Conigrave | Feature film |
| 2016 | Love Yourseif | Self | Short film |
| 2016 | Eaglehawk | Jimmy | Short film |
| 2016 | Supernaturally | Loverman | Short film |
| 2016 | Hacksaw Ridge | Lt. Manville | |
| 2016 | Ali's Wedding | Wazza | |
| 2017 | A Few Less Men | Henry | |
| 2017 | 1% | Vice President Paddo | |
| 2018 | Ladies in Black | Rudi | |
| 2018 | Mary Magdalene | Joseph | |
| 2019 | Below | Dougie | |
| 2020 | High Ground | Braddock | |
| 2020 | Furlough | Rodney | Short film |
| 2023 | Catching Dust | Andy | |
| 2024 | Sting | Ethan Miller | |
| 2025 | Kangaroo | Chris Masterman | |

=== Television ===
| Year | Title | Role | Type |
|---|---|---|---|
| 2003 | The Sleepover Club | Matthew McDougal | 25 episodes |
| 2004 | Silversun | Sheng Zammett | 40 episodes |
| 2005 | Scooter: Secret Agent | Freddie | Episode: "Operation: Double Oh" |
| 2005 | Blue Heelers | Zac Bronski | Episode: "Playing by the Book" |
| 2006 | Neighbours | Charlie Hoyland | Episode: "You're a Big Boy Now" |
| 2006 | Blue Water High | Eric Tanner | Lead role, 26 episodes |
| 2010 | Underbelly: The Golden Mile | Michael Kanaan | 4 episodes |
| 2010 | Tangle | Isaac | 4 episodes |
| 2009–2013 | Packed to the Rafters | Coby Jennings | 65 episodes |
| 2012 | Redfern Now | Timmy | Episode: "Raymond" |
| 2014–2015 | Love Child | Johnny Lowry | 9 episodes |
| 2014 | The Moodys | Sammy | 1 episode |
| 2015 | Banished | Private MacDonald | 7 episodes |
| 2016 | Wanted | Chris Murphett | 2 episodes |
| 2016 | Cleverman | Blair Finch | 6 episodes |
| 2017 | Hoges: The Paul Hogan Story | John Cornell | Miniseries, 2 episodes |
| 2019 | Bloom | Sam / Tommy Brydon | 6 episodes |
| 2019 | Blue Water Empire | Captain Banner | Documentary miniseries |
| 2019 | My Life Is Murder | Samuel Morgan | Episode: "Another Bloody Podcast" |
| 2019 | The Commons | Shay | 8 episodes |
| 2020 | Hungry Ghosts | Ben Williams | 4 episodes |
| 2020–2022 | The Secrets She Keeps | Simon Beecher | 12 episodes |
| 2021 | Wakefield | Raff | 8 episodes |
| 2022 | House of the Dragon | Ser Harwin Strong | 4 episodes |
| 2023 | In Limbo | Charlie | 6 episodes; written by Lucas Taylor |
| 2026 | A Melbourne Match | Zach | Television film |
| 2026 | High Country: What Lies Beneath | Leo Pappas | TV series |

== Stage ==
| Year | Title | Role | Type |
|---|---|---|---|
| 2008 | Measure for Measure | Angelo / Abhorson | NIDA |
| 2012 | Sex with Strangers | | Wharf Theatre with STC |
| 2014 | Cyrano de Bergerac | | Sydney Theatre with STC |
| 2016 | Arcadia | | Sydney Opera House with STC |

== Accolades ==
| Year | Association | Category | Work | Result | Ref. |
|---|---|---|---|---|---|
| 2010 | IF Awards | Out of the Box IF Award | Himself | Won | |
| 2011 | AiF Breakthrough Awards | Heath Ledger Scholarship | Himself | Won | |
| 2011 | Logie Awards | Most Popular New Male Talent | Packed to the Rafters | Nominated | |
| 2011 | Logie Awards | Graham Kennedy Award for Most Outstanding New Talent | Packed to the Rafters | Nominated | |
| 2011 | Equity Ensemble Awards | Outstanding Performance by an Ensemble Series in a Drama Series | Packed to the Rafters | Nominated | |
| 2012 | Equity Ensemble Awards | Outstanding Performance by an Ensemble Series in a Drama Series | Packed to the Rafters | Nominated | |
| 2013 | Film Critics Circle of Australia Awards | Best Actor in a Supporting Role | Not Suitable for Children | Won | |
| 2013 | AACTA Awards | Best Supporting Actor | Not Suitable for Children | Nominated | |
| 2014 | Nocturna Madrid International Fantastic Film Festival | Best Acting Award (shared with John Jarratt) | Wolf Creek 2 | Won | |
| 2015 | GQ Awards | Breakthrough Actor Of The Year GQ MOTY Award | Himself | Won | |
| 2016 | Film Critics Circle of Australia Awards | Best Actor | Holding the Man | Nominated | |
| 2016 | Australian Film Critics Association Awards | Best Actor | Holding the Man | Won | |
| 2016 | Logie Awards | Most Outstanding Supporting Actor | Banished | Nominated | |
| 2018 | AACTA Awards | Best Lead Actor | 1% (Outlaws) | Nominated | |
| 2019 | Australian Film Critics Association Awards | Best Supporting Actor | Ladies in Black | Nominated | |
| 2021 | Equity Ensemble Awards | Outstanding Performance by an Ensemble in a Mini-series or Telemovie | Hungry Ghosts | Won | |
| 2024 | Logies Awards | Best Lead Actor in a Comedy | In Limbo | Nominated | |
