= Craig Stott =

Australian actor (born 1990)

Craig Matthew Stott
- Born: Craigieburn, Melbourne, Victoria, Australia
- Occupation: Actor
- Years active: 2006–present
- Website: craigstott.com

Craig Matthew Stott is an Australian actor, perhaps best known for his role as Josh Watkins in the ABC television drama East of Everything (2008–09), and as the co-lead character John Caleo in Neil Armfield's Holding the Man (2015).

== Personal life and career ==
Stott was born in Craigieburn, a suburb of Melbourne, Victoria, in 1990. A student of the University of Melbourne, Stott studied Middle Eastern Politics and Immigration Studies, and wrote articles on Middle Eastern affairs. Since 2016, he has been based in Amsterdam, Netherlands.

Stott commenced training as an actor at Screen Actors Australia in 2001, at the age of 11. In 2010, he won a scholarship to the Stella Adler Studio of Acting, a New York City–based acting school founded by American actress and writer, Stella Adler. He was named the runner–up to Bella Heathcote for the Heath Ledger Scholarship Award, in 2010.

He was cast in the 2006 Australian adaptation of William Shakespeare's Macbeth, in the role of Fleance. The film, directed by Geoffrey Wright, starred Sam Worthington as Macbeth. For his work in Macbeth, Stott was nominated for the Best Newcomer Award in 2006 by the Australian Film Institute. Also in 2006, Stott appeared in an Australian short film, Teenage Lust. In 2008, Stott appeared in the fourth episode of the eighth season of drama series McLeod's Daughters as Jamie Mitchell, a teenager who has run away from home. Throughout this period in Stott's career, he starred in multiple episodes of the SBS comedy drama Kick in 2007, a guest appearance in the second series of crime drama City Homicide in 2008 and a role in the short film, Leap Year.

His next project was East of Everything, where he landed the regular role of Josh Watkins, a character he portrayed from 2008 to 2009 in the series' two seasons. On his character, Stott drew parallels between himself and Watkins, noting, "He wants to be independent, and that's me all over. At the moment I'm looking to move out. Not because of family problems but because I want my own freedom and that's what Josh is about." His acting was praised by The Age, which heralded Stott's performance as "strong". In 2009, he starred in the Australian film, The Vapour Boys.

Since 2011, Stott has had roles in multiple films, including These Empty Streets (2011), independent comedy horror film Ghost Team One (2013), short films James & Quinn (2013), Grace (2015) and Haven (2015).

=== Holding the Man ===
Ryan and I, for all intents and purposes, were a couple before and during the shoot...We'd go to the bank as a couple, hanging off each other. We’d hold hands in the street. Ryan invited me to a family dinner and everyone assumed his date was going to be a girlfriend but we walked into this swank restaurant holding hands...On set Ryan was my go to. I was always looking for him – very much like John would have done with Tim. I needed him like a lover. I actually fell in love with him.

— Stott on his on-and-off-set romance with co-star Ryan Corr.

While Stott was in Los Angeles in November 2013, he received a brief for a "Gay love story, [set in] Melbourne, 1976" – a role within a film the actor believed "seldom comes along...in Australia’s deeply machismo-oriented society". The film would end up being a film adaption of the 1995 memoir Holding the Man by Australian writer, actor, and activist Timothy Conigrave on his life, and centrally of his relationship with his lover of fifteen years, John Caleo. Following auditions and chemistry tests in London, Stott and fellow Australian actor Ryan Corr were selected as the co-leads of Holding the Man, John Caleo and Timothy Conigrave, respectively. Actors Anthony LaPaglia, Guy Pearce and Geoffrey Rush were chosen for supporting roles within the film.

Production on the film was temporarily suspended in 2014 to allow Stott to lose "up to 12 kilograms" for scenes later in the film which show Caleo with AIDS. On portraying Caleo, Stott noted that, "He wasn’t a very complex person with striking, over-arching ambitions. He wasn’t a boisterous or flamboyant character in the way that Tim was. To try and create a character that was really understated, that is who John was...I was always pulling it back. John really comes through in the subtleties, he’s bubbling under the surface constantly."

The chemistry between Stott and Corr received praise among film reviewers and critics, with the two sharing in multiple sex and other intimate scenes throughout the film. Their on-set relationship also extended outside of Holding the Man, with the two going-out together as a couple and holding hands in public, so as to immerse themselves in the relationship of Conigrave and Caleo. The Guardian Australia praised Stott and Corr for their "memorable performances, both tender and strong, and it is their chemistry audiences will recall most vividly" and The Conversation commended both actors, noting their "palpable" chemistry "which is imperative in order to convey the deep bond [Conigrave and Caleo] had."

== Filmography ==
Film
Year	Title	Role	Notes
2006	Teenage Lust	Teenage Tom	Short film
2006	Macbeth	Fleance	
2008	Leap Year	Peter	Short film
2009	The Vapour Boys	Josh	
2011	These Empty Streets	Pauly	Short film
2013	Ghost Team One	Elder Ammon	
2013	James & Quinn	Hallway Victim	Short film
2015	Grace	Green Jacket	Short film
2015	Holding the Man	John Caleo	
2015	Haven	Shower	Short film
2018	Nigerian Prince	Wallace	

Television
Year	Title	Role	Notes
2007	Kick	Kris	Recurring; 2 episodes
2008	McLeod's Daughters	Jamie Mitchell	Guest; Season 8, episode 4: "Nowhere to Hide"
2008	City Homicide	Hayden Fosdyke	Guest; episode: "Somersaulting Dogs"
2008–09	East of Everything	Josh Watkins	Regular; 13 episodes
