= Suneeta Peres da Costa =

Australian author

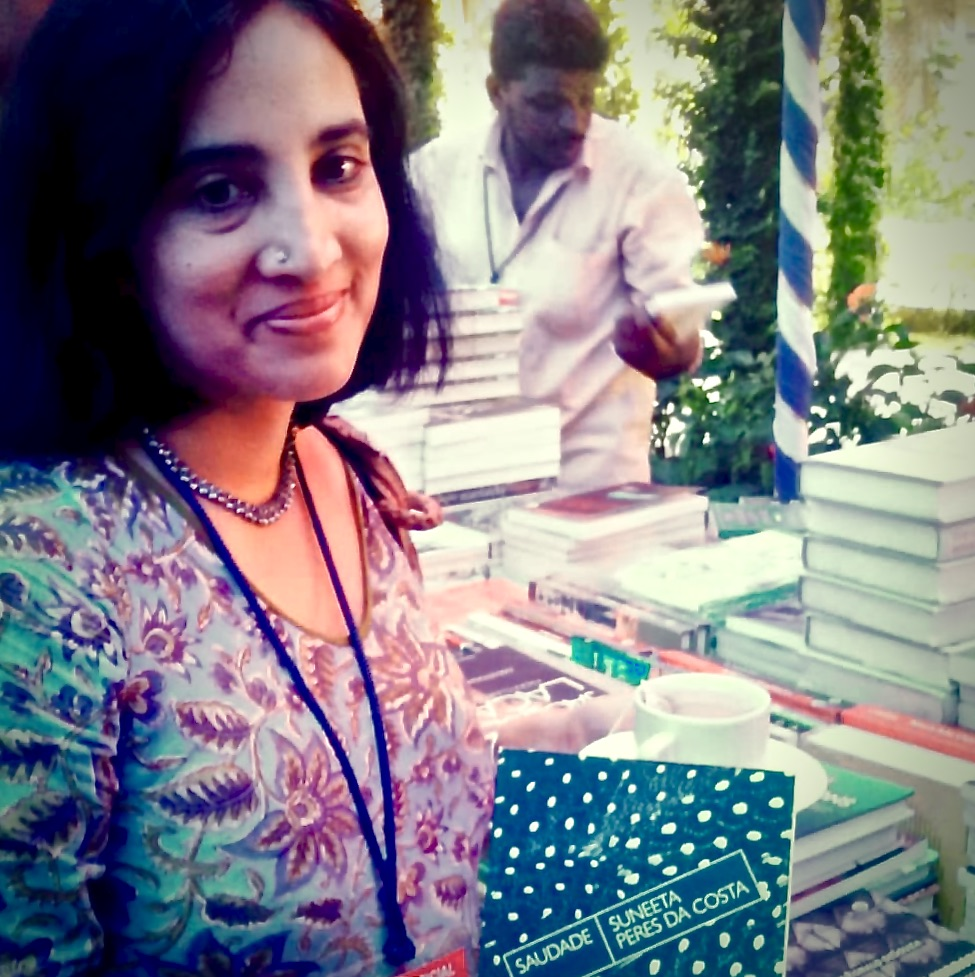
- Da Costa at Goa Arts and Literary Festival, 2018
- Born: Sydney, New South Wales, Australia
- Occupations: Author and playwright
- Writing career
- Notable works: Homework (1999), Saudade (2018)

Suneeta Peres da Costa is an Australian author acclaimed for her tragicomic novel, Homework (1999), a novella, Saudade (2018), and a poetry collection, The Prodigal (2024). She began her career as a playwright and also publishes poetry, non-fiction and literary criticism.

== Life ==
Peres da Costa was born in Sydney, New South Wales, Australia. Of Indian Goan descent, her work references Goan and Indian culture, history, families, lives of girls and women, racism and casteism, diaspora, and European colonialism and postcolonialism. She has also written on asylum seeker justice in Australia, technology and COVID-19, and women and endometriosis.

She graduated with First Class Honours and the University Medal from the Bachelor of Arts in Communication at the University of Technology Sydney, where she later taught creative writing. Among her own teachers were Australian poet Martin Harrison and novelist Glenda Adams. Peres da Costa was a Fulbright Scholar and received a Master of Fine Arts in Writing from Sarah Lawrence College, New York. She pursued doctoral studies on James Joyce at the University of Sydney.

== Career ==
Peres da Costa was twenty-three years old when her tragicomic novel Homework, about a dysfunctional Goan migrant family set in suburban Sydney, was published internationally by Bloomsbury. It was translated into German by Rowohlt, and shortlisted for the Dobbie Literary Award.

She is the author of plays and radio plays including I am an Island, Watermark, Angelina's Song, Children See Everything, Fire and Water. Two biographical works, The Art of Straying (which imagines the last night in the life of cultural philosopher, Walter Benjamin) and Estranged Muse (on James Joyce's daughter) were also produced by the Australian Broadcasting Corporation.

Her 2018 novella on the subject of saudade, follows Maria, a young girl from a Goan immigrant family, growing up in a political hierarchy of racism and colonialism in Portuguese Angola. Saudade was shortlisted in the fiction category of the Prime Minister's Literary Awards 2019, the 2020 Adelaide Festival Awards for Literature and was a finalist in Field Notes' 2020 Tournament of Books.

Suneeta Peres Da Costa's—Saudade— is a beautifully conceived story told from the perspective of a young Goan migrant who lives with her family in Angola during the last years of Portuguese occupation [...] Saudade is notable for the gorgeous fluency of its prose style. Its moving story is told with an elegance and concision that exemplify the virtues of the novella form.

— Judges' Comments, Prime Minister's Literary Awards'

Peres da Costa's writing has appeared in numerous publications and anthologies and she has worked with the National Gallery of Victoria, the Australian Broadcasting Corporation, the National Museum of Australia, the Australian Theatre for Young People, Belvoir St Theatre, Sydney Theatre Company and Sydney Review of Books, as well as many international organisations.

Her honours include grants, fellowships, awards and residencies from the Literature Board of the Australia Council for the Arts, the Copyright Agency, Asialink Arts, the MacDowell Colony for the Arts, the Corporation of Yaddo, the Bundanon Trust, Varuna, The Writers' House, the Valparaíso Foundation, Create NSW, and the Marten Bequest. She has been the guest of many writers' festivals, including the Miami Book Fair, the Stuttgarter Buchwochen, the Cervantes Institute Long Night of Literatures, New Delhi and the Ubud Writers & Readers Festival.

Peres da Costa has served as fiction editor for Mascara Literary Review, a Management Committee member of PEN Sydney and is currently on the Editorial Advisory Board of Heat: Australia's International Literary Magazine.

== Awards ==
- 2020 Field Notes' Tournament of Books, finalist for Saudade
- 2020 Adelaide Festival Awards for Literature, shortlisted for Saudade
- 2019 Australian Prime Minister’s Literary Awards, shortlisted for Saudade
- 2017 Woollhara Digital Literary Award, shortlisted for "A Home in Ananda and the World"
- 2000 Dobbie Literary Award, shortlisted for Homework
- 1997 ABC Ian Reed Foundation Prize for Radio Drama
- 1996 New South Wales Ministry for the Arts Philip Parsons Young Playwrights Award
- 1996 Sydney Theatre Company-ICI Young Playwrights' Award
- 1995 Sydney Theatre Company-ICI Young Playwrights' Award
