= List of children's rights organizations =

This is a list of children's rights organizations by country.

== Organisations ==
Country	Name	Notes
Asia	Child Workers in Asia	
Australia	ChilOut	
Belgium	International Falcon Movement	
Bangladesh	Phulkuri Ashar	
Canada	Canadian Centre for Child Protection	
Canada	Child Welfare League of Canada	
Colombia	Pies Descalzos Foundation	
France	Fondation pour l'enfance	
Germany	Kinderstern	
International	Watchlist	
Iran	Stop Child Executions Campaign	
Ireland	Children's Rights Alliance	
Israel	Israel National Council for the Child	
Pakistan	Children Parliament Pakistan	
South Africa	Children's Rights Project, UWC	
Switzerland	Defence for Children International	
Switzerland	Terre des hommes	
Thailand	Development and Education Programme for Daughters and Communities	
Thailand	ECPAT Thailand	
Thailand	Child Watch Phuket	
Nepal	Sano Sansar Initiative	
Philippines	DSWD	
Netherlands	KidsRights Foundation	
United Kingdom	Children's Rights Alliance for England	
United Kingdom	Action on Rights for Children	
United Kingdom	Child Rights Information Network	
United Kingdom	Save the Children	
United Kingdom	National Society for the Prevention of Cruelty to Children	
United Kingdom	5Rights Foundation	
India	Save the Children India	
United States	Children's Defense Fund	
United States	Children's Rights Council	
United States	Intact America	
United States	The Global Fund for Children	
United States	National Safe Place	
United States	National Center for Missing and Exploited Children	
United States	Stand for Children	
United States	Voices for America's Children	
United States	Distressed Children & Infants International	
International	The Centre for Child Rights and Business	

== See also ==
- Children's Ombudsman
- Children's rights movement
- Children's rights
- Odisha State Child Protection Society
