= Mark Colvin's Kidney =

Play by Tommy Murphy

Mark Colvin's Kidney is a stage play by playwright Tommy Murphy.

== Plot ==
The Sydney Morning Herald journalist Andrew Taylor described the play in a recent article: "Mary-Ellen Field's kidney is one of the better known body parts in Australia. Its new owner, veteran ABC journalist Mark Colvin, is one of this country's more notable organ recipients. Field is also notorious as the business advisor sacked by Elle Macpherson for allegedly leaking information about the supermodel that was later found to have been obtained through phone hacking.

Their relationship offered a dramatic arc that attracted playwright Tommy Murphy. "This is a story about a radio journalist who reaches out to an interviewee on Twitter, a woman who has been the victim of intrusions into her privacy via hacking," Murphy says. "For the most part they are pen pals, via new technologies. And then she saves his life."

== Premiere production ==
The play opened at Sydney's Belvoir on 25 February – 2 April 2017. The director for the premiere production was David Berthold.

=== Cast ===
- John Howard as Mark Colvin
- Sarah Peirse as Mary-Ellen Field
- Helen Thomson aa Elle Macpherson / other roles
- Peter Carroll as various roles
- Kit Esuruoso as various roles
- Christopher Stollery as various roles
