= NSW Philip Parsons Fellowship for Emerging Playwrights =

Australian award for emerging playwrights

The NSW Philip Parsons Fellowship for Emerging Playwrights, formerly the Philip Parsons Young Playwrights Award, is an Australian annual award for early-career playwrights in New South Wales, offered by Belvoir St Theatre and Arts NSW from 1995. It was last awarded in 2018.

== History ==
The award was established in 1995, named in honour of Philip Parsons AM (1926–1993), who was a co-founder of the performing arts publishing company Currency Press, and "an influential teacher and mentor to many of the students, scholars, actors, directors and playwrights who created the new wave of Australian theatre in the 1970s".

Hilary Bell won the inaugural award with her play Wolf Lullaby in 1995.

In 2010 Caleb Lewis turned down the award in protest against the lack of gender diversity in the company's 2010 season.

From 2013 the award was renamed the Philip Parsons Fellowship for Emerging Playwrights.

In 2019 (for 2020), the Fellowship evolved into the NSW Philip Parsons Early-Career Playwrights' Lab, whereby Belvoir would take on four new writers (or teams) along with one story developer or dramaturgical/ directorial participant. Successful applicants would work with Belvoir for a year (2020) on developing a new work. However, this did not appear to extend beyond 2020. (Note: Possibly because of the COVID-19 pandemic in Australia?)

== Description ==
Recipients of the original award had to be under the age of 35 years and a resident of New South Wales; but the fellowship, by 2016, was open to a playwright of any age, within the first eight years of their professional practice. This requirement continued when the fellowship became the playwrights' lab in the 2020 edition, which dropped the requirement to be a NSW resident.

The fellowship is presented as part of the Philip Parsons Memorial Lecture, given annually at the Belvoir St Theatre. The winner is selected on the basis of a completed and produced script and an outline for another work. The winner received a full commission from Belvoir to develop their outline into a full play.

== Winners of the award ==
NSW Philip Parsons Fellowship for Emerging Playwrights

- 2018 – Kendall Feaver – Almighty Sometimes
- 2017 – Emme Hoy – Exctinction
- 2016 – Holly Austin, Adriano Cappelletta and Jo Turner – Ruby's Wish
- 2015 – Nakkiah Lui – Kill the Messenger and S. Shakthidharan – A Counting and Cracking of Heads (two fellowships were awarded)
- 2014 – Julia-Rose Lewis – Samson
- 2013 – Ian Meadows – Between Two Waves

Philip Parsons Young Playwrights Award

- 2012 – Kit Brookman – Heaven
- 2011 – Zoe Coombs Marr – And That Was the Summer That Changed My Life
- 2010 – Matthew Whittet -Old Man
- 2009 – Tahli Corin – Blush
- 2008 – Khoa Do – To 100 Years of Happiness
- 2007 – Tommy Murphy – Holding the Man
- 2006 – Patrick Brammall and John Leary – Vital Organs
- 2005 – Brendan Cowell – Walk Don't Run (2001)
- 2004 – Kate Mulvany – The Seed (2008)
- 2003 – Jonathan Gavin – A Moment on the Lips
- 2002 – (to be identified)
- 2001 – (to be identified)
- 2000 – Emma Vuletic – Imago
- 1999 – Adam Grossetti – Lost Lagoon
- 1998 – (to be identified)
- 1997 – (to be identified)
- 1996 – Suneeta Peres Da Costa
- 1995 – Hilary Bell – Wolf Lullaby

== See also ==
- List of Australian literary awards
