= Night on Bald Mountain (play) =

Play by Patrick White

Night on Bald Mountain is a play by Australian writer Patrick White.

The action takes place during twenty-four hours on isolated Bald Mountain beyond Sydney. White had called it the first true Australian tragedy.

It premiered in March 1964 by the University of Adelaide Theatre Guild for the as yet unestablished "Fringe" alongside the Adelaide Festival of the Arts that year.

Later major productions include a 1996 Company B Belvoir (Sydney) & State Theatre Company of South Australia production directed by Neil Armfield, and a 2014 Malthouse Theatre (Melbourne) production directed by Matthew Lutton.

== Original cast ==
The cast for the premiere consisted of:

- Nita Pannell as Miss Quodling
- Alexander Archdale as Professor Hugo Sword
- Joan Bruce as Miriam Sword
- Barbara West as Stella Summerhayes
- Myra Noblett as Mrs Sibley
- James Hind as Cantwell
- Robert Leach as Denis Braig
- Don Barker as Second Hiker
- Laurie Davies as First Hiker
