= Katharine Brisbane =

Australian publisher and journalist

Katharine Brisbane AM
- Born: Katharine Elizabeth Brisbane; 7 January 1932 (age 94); Singapore
- Education: University of Western Australia
- Occupations: Journalist, publisher
- Known for: Founder of Currency Press
- Awards: Helpmann Award

Katharine Elizabeth Brisbane AM (born 7 January 1932) is a Singaporean-born Australian journalist and publisher, well known for her writings as a theatre critic and founding firm Currency Press.

== Early life and education ==
Katharine Brisbane was born in Singapore on 7 January 1932, to David Williams, a civil engineer, and Myra Glady Brisbane. She spent her early years growing up in Western Australia, living in Peppermint Grove.

Brisbane graduated from the University of Western Australia with a Bachelor of Arts, during her time at UWA she participated in student theatre, firstly designing costumes and then moving onto directing productions.

== Career ==
Brisbane upon graduating university became a cadet at newspaper The West Australian, and spent 18 months in London. She took up the position of theatre critic for The West Australian from 1959 to 1961, and again from 1962 to 1965. This work provided her the platform she needed to become the national theatre critic for The Australian from 1967 to 1974. In this role, she was a part of the changing Australian drama of the new wave at the time and saw many new emerging Australian plays and playwrights. She documents these productions in her 2005 book Not Wrong: Just Different. She also wrote as the national theatre writer for The National Times from 1981 to 1982.

Brisbane founded Currency Press with her husband Philip Edward Parsons in 1971 and it became the largest independent publishing company in Australia. The first play that Currency published was Macquarie, a 1972 play by Alex Buzo. In 1995, with Brisbane's continual backing, Currency published The Concise Companion to Australian Theatre (ed. Philip Parsons).

Brisbane's writings include contributions to The Literature of Australia, World Drama, Contemporary Australian Drama: Perspectives Since 1955, as well as New Currents in Australian Writing, which she co-edited. She has also written introductions for many plays published by Currency Press.

== High Court case ==
In 1967, Brisbane wrote a scathing review of the Sydney production of Othello in which Peter O'Shaughnessy both directed and played the part of Othello. Brisbane wrote, in part, "Stupidity and lack of talent are forgivable; brave failures are deserving of praise – these are every day human failings. But the waste and dishonesty of this production ... made me very angry indeed".

O'Shaughnessy sued Brisbane for libel – the first libel case against a critic in Australia. The case was argued before the High Court of Australia, where O'Shaughnessy won with a unanimous judgment. In a joint statement, Garfield Barwick, McTiernan, Menzies and Owen wrote: "This is one of those cases where the critic, in making her evaluation that the production was a disaster... did not plainly confine herself to commenting upon facts truly stated; she wrote what could, we think, have been regarded as amounting to a defamatory statement of fact...". In a separate judgment, Windeyer went further, "the matter published by the respondent in its newspaper was a vigorous, and in parts abusive criticism of a public performance of 'Othello'." The newspaper ultimately settled with O'Shaughnessy. However, it had a lasting impact on O'Shaughnessy's career, for he left for London shortly afterwards, effectively ending his career on the Australian stage. As for Brisbane, she saw it as the making of her career: "So they settled... which was a bit sad. But after that my columns were read".

== Honours and awards ==
In 1993, Brisbane was made a Member of the Order of Australia, "In recognition of service to Australian drama, particularly as co-founder of Currency Press".

=== Helpmann Awards ===
The Helpmann Awards is an awards show, celebrating live entertainment and performing arts in Australia, presented by industry group Live Performance Australia (LPA) since 2001. In 2012, Brisbane received the JC Williamson Award, the LPA's highest honour, for their life's work in live performance.

Year	Nominee / work	Award	Result
2012	Herself	JC Williamson Award	awarded
