= Heaven (play) =

Play by Kit Brookman

- Written by: Kit Brookman

Premiere
- Date: 16 November 2011
- Place: Old 505 Theatre, Surry Hills, New South Wales

Heaven is a 2011 play by Kit Brookman. The play premiered at the Old 505 Theatre, Surry Hills, New South Wales, Australia in November 2011.

== Plot ==
When schoolgirl Angela Farnsworth is run over and killed by a van, three other children, Max, Stewart and Sally, perform a ritual to bring her back.

== Production history ==
Heaven first premiered at the Old 505 Theatre in Surry Hills, New South Wales from November 16 and ran to November 27, 2011, with Geraldine Hakewill as Angela Farnsworth

In 2013, Heaven was performed at the La Mama Theatre in Carlton, Victoria, directed by Brookman.

== Awards ==
In 2012, Brookman was awarded the Philip Parsons Young Playwrights Award for Heaven.
