= Troy's House =

1999 play by Tommy Murphy

Troy's House is a play about growing up in Canberra by Tommy Murphy. Troy's House was first performed at the Sydney University Dramatic Society (SUDS) in 1999. The production was then presented by the Australian Theatre for Young People (ATYP) and the Tamarama Rock Surfers (TRS) at the Old Fitzroy Theatre in 2000. This production also travelled to the Queanbeyan Bicentennial Centre. The play has more recently been produced by La Mama (Melbourne) in 2005.

A synopsis to the play reads: The most important house in Canberra isn't on top of a hill and it doesn't have a flagpole. It's a small govie house in Waramanga where love blossoms in a cloud of pot smoke, where partying is infectious and so is the couch. (Source: Australian Script Centre)

A memorable scene is an intricately layered conversation between stoned teenagers and a security guard on Australia's Parliament House, Canberra.

'Murphy's grasp of the relevant vernacular is spot-on... What makes Troy's House enormously enjoyable is its irreverent satire, with a thread of subtextual seriousness in terms of class analysis...' Helen Thomson, The Age, Feb 7, 2005

The play was revived by SUDS in October 2023, directed by Bella Wellstead and starring Sahana Athreya.
