= Peter O'Shaughnessy =

Australian actor (1923–2013)

- Born: 5 October 1923
- Died: 17 July 2013 (aged 89)
- Occupations: Actor; theatre director; producer; writer

Peter O'Shaughnessy OAM (5 October 1923 – 17 July 2013) was an Australian actor, theatre director, producer and writer who presented the work of playwrights ranging from Shakespeare, Shaw, Ibsen, Strindberg, Chekhov to modern dramatists, such as Ionesco, Pinter and Beckett.

== Biography ==
O'Shaughnessy was born in 1923, he acted as a mentor to and collaborator with comedian Barry Humphries in his early career. He attended Xavier College, Melbourne.

O'Shaughnessy was a pioneering exponent of Samuel Beckett, both in Australia and in Ireland. He produced the first Waiting for Godot in Australia in 1957. He played Krapp in the Australian premier of Krapp's Last Tape at the Arts Theatre in Melbourne in 1959. He also toured a second production of Godot in Sydney and Canberra in 1969, and later directed the Irish premières of Not I (1978), Footfalls (1978), and Rockaby (1984), and unofficial world premiers of Theatre I and Theatre II (later published in modified form as Rough for Theatre I and II) in Cambridge in 1977.

O'Shaughnessy was also noted for his one-act performances of Diary of a Madman, adapted from Gogol. In 1968 he co-created an illustrated anthology, The Restless Years, based on his award-winning television program of the same name (not to be confused with the 1977–81 soap opera The Restless Years). After bringing Shakespeare to Australian audiences in the 1960s, his Australian career was cut short after a devastating review published in The Australian by Katharine Brisbane. After a trial and an unsuccessful appeal, the case was ultimately determined in the High Court of Australia, where a new trial was ordered. However, he ceased working in Australia. In 1970 he left for London and continued to act in and direct Shakespeare in the UK and Ireland. For The British Council he has lectured on the plays of Shakespeare to universities in many countries of Europe, and in West Africa and South America. As a historian, his two books on General Joseph Holt and his book on John Mitchel focused on Australian/Irish history.

== Collaboration with Barry Humphries ==
One of O'Shaughnessy's lasting legacies was his mentoring of the young Barry Humphries who has acknowledged that, "without O'Shaughnessy's nurturing and promotion, the character of Edna Everage would have been nipped in the bud after 1956 and never come to flower, while the character of Sandy Stone would never have taken shape as a presence on the stage". With O'Shaughnessy's encouragement, the character (Everage) ... developed considerably.

In September 1957, he staged the first Australian production of Samuel Beckett's Waiting for Godot at the Arrow Theatre in Melbourne with himself as Vladimir and Humphries as Estragon. It proved a hit with both audiences and critics. The critic of the Melbourne Sun wrote "so engrossing and well-done is this extraordinary adventure by Samuel Beckett regimented by Peter O'Shaughnessy's tender care that for me the evening passed by on wings". Later in the same year, O'Shaughnessy planned a production of George Bernard Shaw's Pygmalion for December, in tandem with a children's play to be performed at matinees. Part of the idea for a bush story involving a bunyip came from Frank Dalby Davison's book Children of the Dark People in which Old Man Bunyip is a wise guardian of the bush. After rejecting various scripts, O'Shaughnessy, Humphries and two radio scriptwriters, Jeff Underhill and Don Whitelock, produced their own script, which became The Bunyip and the Satellite.

The children's show was a hit, and Humphries' performance as the Bunyip widely praised. O'Shaughnessy himself wrote that "Barry's performance as The Bunyip was the finest and most touching he had ever given in the theatre, and the character very close to his secret heart." Humphries described his creation as a "prancing bird-like clown with a falsetto that inevitably got huskier after twelve performances a week".

In an interview in the Australian magazine Theatre in 1960, Humphries went further by linking the bush creature with another of his recent creations, the suburban denizen Edna Everage: 'I notice Mrs Everage sometimes behaves in a slightly Bunyippy way ... she gives a spasmodic leap, which I subsequently recognise as a rather bunyippy trait.

== High Court Case ==
O'Shaughnessy received a scathing review for the 1967 Sydney production of Othello, which he directed and starred as Othello, from theatre critic for The Australian, Katharine Brisbane. She said, in part: "Stupidity and lack of talent are forgivable; brave failures are deserving of praise – these are every day human failings. But the waste and dishonesty of this production ... made me very angry indeed." O'Shaughnessy launched action for defamation. The case for O'Shaughnessy was argued before the High Court by 27-year-old junior counsel Mary Gaudron (later a High Court judge) in her first High Court case after O'Shaughnessy sacked Clive Evatt. According to O'Shaughnessy, "she cut a valiant figure, this 'slip of a girl', who stood unsupported before the five legal elders of the land. They were obviously impressed by her courage, her sheer elegant dash, her shining intellect finding expression in felicitous language, her good manners, charm, poise. And perhaps, when all is said and done, by her sheer cheek in taking on the case." He won a unanimous judgment, successfully arguing that Brisbane had imputed that he had promoted his performance at the expense of his fellow actors, and that it was open to the jury to find that the use of the word 'dishonest' imputed such a dishonourable motive and therefore could be viewed as a statement of fact which had to be justified by evidence of which there was none to that effect. In a joint judgment, Barwick, McTiernan, Menzies and Owen wrote: "This is one of those cases where the critic, in making her evaluation that the production was a disaster ... did not plainly confine herself to commenting upon facts truly stated; she wrote what could, we think, have been regarded as amounting to a defamatory statement of fact, viz. that the producer dishonestly suppressed the roles of other players to highlight his own role."

In a separate judgment, Windeyer went further: "the matter published by the respondent in its newspaper was a vigorous, and in parts abusive criticism of a public performance of 'Othello'". The court held this was not fair comment on the performance as such, and ordered a retrial. However, the case did not go back to court. The newspaper settled with O'Shaughnessy. However, it had a lasting impact on O'Shaughnessy's career, for he left for London shortly afterwards effectively ending his career on the Australian stage. As for Brisbane, she saw it the making of her career: "So they settled ... which was a bit sad. But after that my columns were read."

== Legacy ==
Phillip Adams wrote in The Australian, under the banner "Gonged but not forgotten", an article pointing out a number of Australians who had made a significant contribution to their respective fields who had not received the public recognition of an Order of Australia' ... here's a partial list of the worthies who didn't make the cut ... Peter O'Shaughnessy for his titanic and sadly overlooked services to Australian theatre in the 1960s'.

In the 2013 Australia Day Honours List, O'Shaughnessy was awarded an Order of Australia Medal (OAM) "for service to the performing arts as a writer, theatre director, actor, historian and folklorist".

== Books by O'Shaughnessy ==
- Peter O'Shaughnessy, Graeme Inson, and Russel Ward, The Restless Years – Being Some Impressions of the Origin of the Australian, The Jacaranda Press (1968), ASIN: B004H4EYJI.
- Peter O'Shaughnessy, The Fabulous Journey of Mac Con Glin, Sabrainne (1989), ASIN: B0007BNZPY.

== See also ==
- Adam's Woman
- Mumba Jumba and The Bunyip
