= Margaret Thanos =

Australian theatre director

Margaret Thanos is an Australian theatre director, activist and arts advocate. She has made work for Belvoir St Theatre, Sydney Theatre Company, Sport for Jove, 25A, New Theatre and the Old Fitz Theatre. In 2026, she directed Sam Holcroft's A Mirror for Belvoir and Jez Butterworth's The River for Sydney Theatre Company.

== Career ==
Thanos began directing in Sydney's independent theatre sector. Her early directing credits included A Grain of Sand, Labyrinth and the Australian premiere of Lucy Prebble's A Very Expensive Poison at New Theatre.

In 2023, Thanos received the Sandra Bates Director's Award from Ensemble Theatre, alongside Emma Canalese.

In 2024, she was appointed the Andrew Cameron Fellow at Belvoir St Theatre. That year she created and directed Not Now, Not Ever: A Parliament of Women for Belvoir's 25A program, a contemporary adaptation after Aristophanes. In 2025, Thanos directed Melissa Reeves' Furious Mattress for Belvoir's 25A program, a dark comedy based on a true story from rural Victoria.

Thanos also directed I Hate People; Or Timon of Athens, an adaptation of Shakespeare's Timon of Athens for Sport for Jove. Reviewing the production in The Sydney Morning Herald, John Shand described it as "the pinnacle of Shakespeare in Sydney this century".

In 2026, Thanos directed Sam Holcroft's A Mirror at Belvoir St Theatre. The production was described by Belvoir as her mainstage debut at the company. The same year, she directed Jez Butterworth's The River for Sydney Theatre Company, starring Miranda Otto, Ewen Leslie and Andrea Demetriades.

Thanos has been profiled by media outlets including the Australian Broadcasting Corporation and Vogue Australia in relation to her work on A Mirror and The River.

== Activism and advocacy ==
Thanos has worked as a youth advocate with Plan International Australia, focusing on gender equality, online safety and youth participation in politics.

In 2021, she was quoted by SBS News in coverage of young women calling for reforms to address misogyny in Australia's Parliament. Thanos co-authored an article for Plan International Australia with Olivia Causer about online safety and gender-based harassment.
