= Aftershocks (play) =

1993 Australian play by Paul Brown

- Author: Paul Brown
- Cover artist: Design: Katy Wall. Photo: Steve Tickner
- Language: English
- Genre: Play
- Publisher: Currency Press
- Publication date: 1993
- Publication place: Australia
- Media type: Print (Paperback)
- ISBN: 978-0-86819-650-3

Aftershocks is a play by Australian playwright Paul Brown. It was first performed at the Newcastle Playhouse, Newcastle in 1991.

== Plot ==
A moving documentary play drawn from the traumatic recollections of members of the Newcastle Workers' Club, which was destroyed in the 1989 earthquake.

== First production ==
Aftershocks was first presented by the Workers’ Cultural Action Committee with the assistance of the Hunter Valley Theatre Company at the Newcastle Playhouse, Newcastle, on 12 November 1991 with the following cast and crew:

- HOWARD, WAYNE: David Yarrow
- BOB, STAN, EDDIE: Paul Makeham
- JOHN, STEFO: David Cameron
- LYN, MELBA, JULIE: Kath Leahy
- ELAINE, MARG, PATRON: Rebecca Brandon
- KERRY, FAY, JENNY: Susie Porter
- Writer-in-residence, Paul Brown
- Directors, Brent McGregor and David Watt
- Designed by the Company
- Lighting, Peter Ross
- Project Administration, Julie Pavlou Kirri, and David Owens
