= Nita Pannell =

Australian teacher, actor and theatre director (1904–1994)

Nita Pannell AM OBE
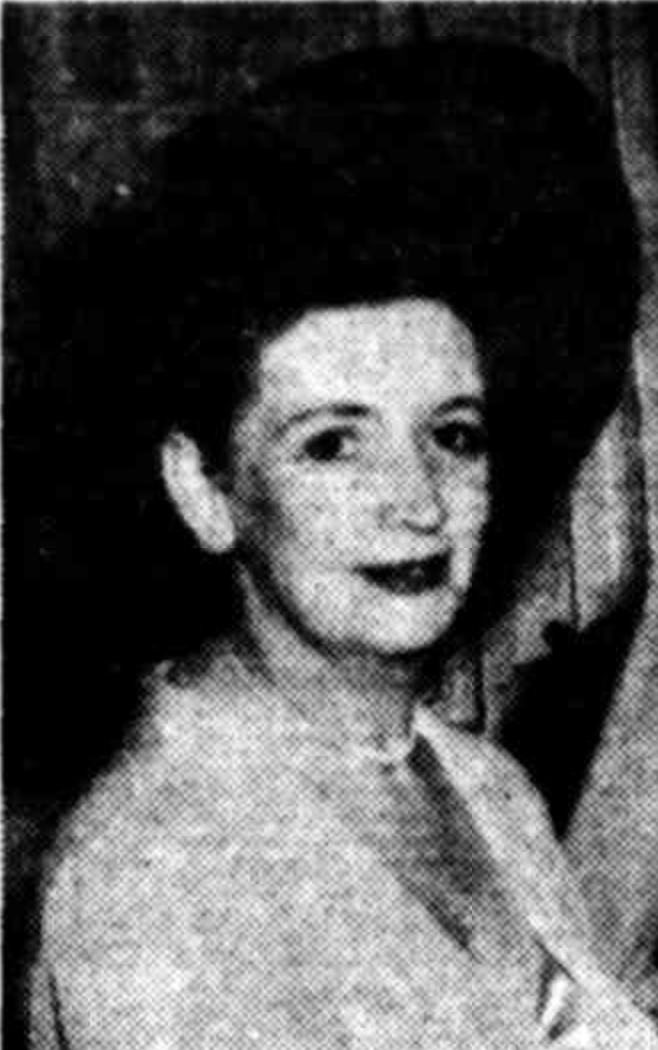
- Pannell in 1950, rehearsing for Noel Coward's Hay Fever
- Born: Nita Veronica Hanrahan; 1 July 1904; Wellington Mill, Western Australia
- Died: 29 September 1994 (aged 90); Claremont, Western Australia

Nita Veronica Pannell AM OBE (1 July 1904 – 29 September 1994) was an Australian teacher, actress and theatre director.

In the 1950s Pannell produced a number of plays and operettas for Perth amateur groups such as The Playboy of the Western World (Phoenix Players), The Pirates of Penzance (Gilbert and Sullivan Society), St Patrick's Day (Chiron Club) and The New Moon (Repertory Club).

== Notable performances ==
Pannell appeared as Mum in the professional premiere of Alan Seymour's The One Day of the Year at the Palace Theatre in Sydney. She toured with the play to England with fellow cast members Ron Haddrick and Reg Lye.

Patrick White wrote A Cheery Soul with Pannell in mind for the role of Miss Docker. In the 1963 premiere, her performance was described as "brilliant" by The Bulletin.

In 1964 she played the leading role of Miss Quodling in the premiere of Patrick White's play, Night on Bald Mountain in Adelaide.

Perth writer, Mary Durack and Pannell collaborated to create Swan River Saga, which the latter premiered at the 1972 Festival of Perth and then went on tour.

Pannell premiered her one-woman show, Adam's Rib, at the 1975 Festival of Perth and subsequently performed it at the Australia 75 festival in Canberra.

== Awards and recognition ==
Pannell was appointed an Officer of the Order of the British Empire in 1977 and a Member of the Order of Australia in 1989, in both cases for "service to the performing arts". In 1981 she was named Western Australian Citizen of the Year (arts).
