= A Cheery Soul =

1963 play by Patrick White

A Cheery Soul is a 1963 play by Australian writer Patrick White set in the fictional Sydney suburb of Sarsaparilla at the end of the 1950s. White described it as being about "the destructive power of good."

== Productions ==
A Cheery Soul premiered at the Union Theatre Repertory Company in Melbourne in November 1963 directed by John Sumner, with Nita Pannell as the 'cheery soul' Miss Docker.

Other major productions have included:

- 1979 Sydney Theatre Company directed by Jim Sharman starring Robyn Nevin
- 1992 Royal Queensland Theatre Company (Brisbane) directed by Neil Armfield starring Carole Skinner
- 2000 Company B Belvoir and Sydney Theatre Company directed by Neil Armfield starring Robyn Nevin
- 2018 Sydney Theatre Company directed by Kip Williams starring Sarah Peirse

== In popular culture ==
The play's chief character Miss Docker, as portrayed in 2018 by Sarah Peirse, was the subject of a portrait by Jude Rae, entered into the 2019 Archibald Prize. The artist had many sittings with the actor and has said of it: "Miss Docker's moments of isolation on stage also suggested a formal structure [for the painting] based on a famous 17th century portrait by Diego Velásquez of the actor Pablo de Valladolid, a buffoon in the court of King Phillip IV of Spain." The artist also said: "perhaps this painting is something of an anti-portrait, a reminder that we are to some degree actors, projecting various versions of ourselves..."

== 1966 TV adaptation ==
It was adapted for British TV - the setting relocated to 'the new new commuter-belt in the south of England' - and screened on the BBC on 27 April 1966. The Daily Mirror reviewer called it tedious, while the Daily Telegraph's critic declared that lead actor Hazel Hughes played Miss Docker with 'enormous zest in a performance sometimes caricatured and sometimes touching.'
