= Holding the Man (film) =

2015 Australian film directed by Neil Armfiel

- Theatrical release poster
- Directed by: Neil Armfield
- Screenplay by: Tommy Murphy
- Based on: Holding the Man by Timothy Conigrave
- Produced by: Kylie Du Fresne
- Starring: Ryan Corr; Craig Stott
- Cinematography: Germain McMicking
- Edited by: Dany Cooper
- Music by: Alan John
- Production company: Goalpost Pictures
- Distributed by: Transmission Films
- Release date: 27 August 2015
- Running time: 128 minutes
- Country: Australia
- Language: English
- Budget: $170,000
- Box office: US$909,122

Holding the Man is a 2015 Australian romantic drama film adapted from Timothy Conigrave's 1995 memoir of the same name. It was directed by Neil Armfield and stars Ryan Corr and Craig Stott, with supporting performances from Guy Pearce, Anthony LaPaglia, Sarah Snook, Kerry Fox and Geoffrey Rush. The screenplay was written by Tommy Murphy who also adapted the memoir for the stage play.

== Plot ==
In 1993, Timothy Conigrave (Ryan Corr) is in Lipari, Italy, and he calls his childhood friend Pepe Trevor (Sarah Snook) in a panic, asking her where his deceased partner John Caleo (Craig Stott) was sitting at a dinner party they had when they were teenagers. The time expires before Pepe can tell him. Later, a concierge at the hotel Tim is staying at passes on a message from Pepe to Tim.

In 1976, Tim and John are students at Xavier College in Melbourne. They have geography together. Tim falls in love with John, and invites him to the school play of Romeo and Juliet, where Tim is playing the role of Paris, but John does not make it. Tim invites John to a dinner party with Pepe and some of their friends from the play, and they pass a kiss around the table. Tim later asks John out and he accepts. Initially, John is not comfortable with doing anything sexual with Tim, who writes a letter to John apologising for reaching into his trousers while making out after school. The letter is intercepted by their geography teacher who tells them the staff already know about their relationship, and advises them to be careful. While on a study break, Tim and John are caught having sex by their school friends. They all later go streaking. When Tim returns home, his parents Dick (Guy Pearce) and Mary Gert (Kerry Fox) tell him John's father Bob (Anthony LaPaglia) found Tim's letter and threatens court action if Tim refuses to keep his distance. Tim angrily leaves and rides his bike to John's house, where he overhears Bob tell John that his mother Lois (Camilla Ah Kin) will make an appointment for his son to see a psychologist. Tim and John flee together.

In 1985, Tim interviews an HIV patient called Richard for a play he is writing. Later, Tim and John both go to the doctor for an HIV test. John is given a negative result, but Tim is given a positive result. Their doctor (Mitchell Butel) then reveals there was a filing mistake and both Tim and John are actually HIV positive.

In 1979, Tim is studying science at Monash University and an active member of the University's Gay Society. Tim becomes flirtatious with other men he and John spend time with, and starts cheating on John when he does not support Tim's request that they try having sex with other people. Tim reveals to John he put his name down to audition for NIDA and asks that they have a trial separation while Tim is in Sydney. Tim returns to Melbourne and reveals he has been accepted. He moves to Sydney for NIDA and has his classes under the instruction of his teacher Barry (Geoffrey Rush), but they clash during a rehearsal for A Streetcar Named Desire. Meanwhile, Tim has sex with different boys from his class and goes to a gay sauna. During a performance of Private Lives, Tim sees John in the audience and stumbles on a line ("I want you back. Please, John"). They reconcile and resume their relationship when John decides to move to Sydney.

In 1988, while in Melbourne for his sister's wedding, Tim is contacted by the Red Cross and is told that the blood that he donated in 1981 was pooled with blood from other donors, was given to a patient who has gone on to develop AIDS, and that he is the only donor to be contacted who tested positive to HIV. Despite his mother's warnings of ruining the wedding spirit, Tim tearfully expresses his grief at the fact that he may have infected John.

In 1991, John's condition gets worse and he is frequently in the hospital. Tim starts to notice his own condition is slowly deteriorating and collapses one day while looking after John. He has a manic episode after a swelling in his brain occurs and is diagnosed with Toxoplasmosis. Bob visits them to discuss John's will and is upset that all of John's possessions will go to Tim when he dies. They negotiate and it is revealed that Bob has been telling people John has cancer, not AIDS. John is well enough to return home and he and Tim make love. They go home to Melbourne for Christmas and John collapses while decorating the Christmas Tree. John is re-admitted. While exchanging Christmas presents, John confesses to Tim he was close to death and it felt so easy to let go, which deeply upsets Tim.

On 26 January 1992, Father Woods (Paul Goddard) approaches Tim while at the hospital and tells him he will include Tim during the funeral and refer to him as John's friend so as to not further alienate John's family. Tim angrily tells him that they have been together for 15 years and that John is his husband. John dies shortly after and the funeral is held with students from Xavier College.

The film returns to the beginning, and Pepe phones Tim's hotel. We see the note from earlier says "John was beside you." While on his travels in Italy, Tim narrates the closing chapter of his memoir, which is his final letter to John. The film tells the audience Tim completed his memoir (Holding the Man) in October 1994 and succumbed to his AIDS ten days later aged 34.

In a post-credits bonus, an excerpt from an interview of the real Tim Conigrave shortly before he died plays while a picture of John and Tim as teenagers is shown.

== Cast ==
- Ryan Corr as Timothy Conigrave
- Craig Stott as John Caleo
- Sarah Snook as Pepe Trevor
- Guy Pearce as Dick Conigrave
- Anthony LaPaglia as Bob Caleo
- Kerry Fox as Mary Gert Conigrave
- Camilla Ah Kin as Lois Caleo
- Tessa de Josselin as Anna Conigrave
- Tom Hobbs as Peter Craig
- PiaGrace Moon as Prue
- Caleb McClure as Nick Conigrave
- Geoffrey Rush as Barry
- Lee Cormie as Eric
- Kaarin Fairfax as herself
- Paul Goddard as Father Woods
- Jacob Collins-Levy as Andrew
- Tegan Higginbotham as Gina
- Kris McQuade as Aunt Mary
- Kerry Walker as Librarian in lift
- Gina Riley as Popcorn Seller (uncredited)

== Reception ==
The film received positive reviews, with particular praise for the chemistry between Craig Stott and Ryan Corr. The Guardian Australia praised their "memorable performances, both tender and strong, and it is their chemistry audiences will recall most vividly", and The Conversation commended both actors, noting their "palpable" chemistry "which is imperative in order to convey the deep bond [Conigrave and Caleo] had". On review aggregator website Rotten Tomatoes, the film has an 81% 'fresh' approval rating and an average score of 6.9 out of 10 based on 22 reviews.

== Accolades ==
Award	Category	Subject	Result
AACTA Awards (5th)	Best Film	Kylie Du Fresne	Nominated
AACTA Awards (5th)	Best Direction	Neil Armfield	Nominated
AACTA Awards (5th)	Best Adapted Screenplay	Tommy Murphy	Nominated
AACTA Awards (5th)	Best Actor	Ryan Corr	Nominated
AACTA Awards (5th)	Best Supporting Actor	Anthony LaPaglia	Nominated
AACTA Awards (5th)	Best Editing	Dany Cooper	Nominated
ASE Award	Best Editing in a Feature Film	Dany Cooper	Won
AFCA Awards	Best Film	Kylie Du Fresne	Nominated
AFCA Awards	Best Director	Neil Armfield	Nominated
AFCA Awards	Best Screenplay	Tommy Murphy	Nominated
AFCA Awards	Best Actor	Ryan Corr	Won
AFCA Awards	Best Supporting Actor	Anthony LaPaglia	Nominated
ASSG Award	Best Sound	Mark Cornish	Nominated
ASSG Award	Best Sound	Nicole Lazaroth	Nominated
ASSG Award	Best Sound	Dan Lustri	Nominated
AWGIE Award	Best Writing in a Feature Film — Adapted	Tommy Murphy	Won
FCCA Awards	Best Film	Kylie Du Fresne	Nominated
FCCA Awards	Best Director	Neil Armfield	Nominated
FCCA Awards	Best Script/Screenplay	Tommy Murphy	Won
FCCA Awards	Best Actor	Ryan Corr	Nominated
FCCA Awards	Best Supporting Actor	Anthony LaPaglia	Nominated
FCCA Awards	Best Editor	Dany Cooper	Nominated
FCCA Awards	Best Production Design	Josephine Ford	Won
Melbourne International Film Festival	People's Choice Award for Best Narrative Feature	Neil Armfield	2nd place
SPA Award	Best Feature Film Production	Kylie Du Fresne	Won
