= The Syringa Tree =

The Syringa Tree is a solo performance memory play of a childhood under apartheid, written and often performed by Pamela Gien, and directed by Larry Moss. It was produced by Matt Salinger, son of writer, J. D. Salinger.

== Synopsis ==
The play is set in apartheid-era South Africa, told through the eyes of a young white girl named Elizabeth Grace. The play, which spans four generations, explores the complex relationships between a white family and their Black nanny, Salamina, and their community, revealing the injustices and humanity of the time through a child's perspective.

== Production ==
The play debuted in Seattle, WA. It later opened at the Playhouse 91 intimate theater in Yorkville, Manhattan in Fall 2000. The Manhattan reception was lukewarm at first, but news of Gien's performance soon garnered attention, drawing the interest of celebrities such as Oprah and Rosie O'Donnell.“The San Francisco Chronicle praised her performance as ‘breathtakingly versatile, superb, graceful, emotionally generous, impressive,’ while The Washington Post noted that ‘every moment with this gifted young actress feels special.’”

It won an Obie Award for Best Play in 2001.

Gien often performs the play herself, portraying over twenty characters, and has also adapted it into a novel.

== Awards and nominations ==
=== 2000 Off-Broadway production ===
Year	Award	Category	Work	Result	Ref.
2001	Obie Award	Best Play		Won	
2001	Drama Desk Award	Outstanding Solo Performance	Pamela Gien	Won	
2001	Outer Critics Circle Award	Outstanding Solo Performance	Pamela Gien	Won	
2001	Drama League Award	Distinguished Production of a Play		Nominated	
