= Sandy Stone =

Sandy Stone may refer to:

- Sandy Stone (artist) (born 1936), American author and artist
- Sandy Stone (character), a character created by Barry Humphries
