= Watchlist (play) =

2021 Australian stage play

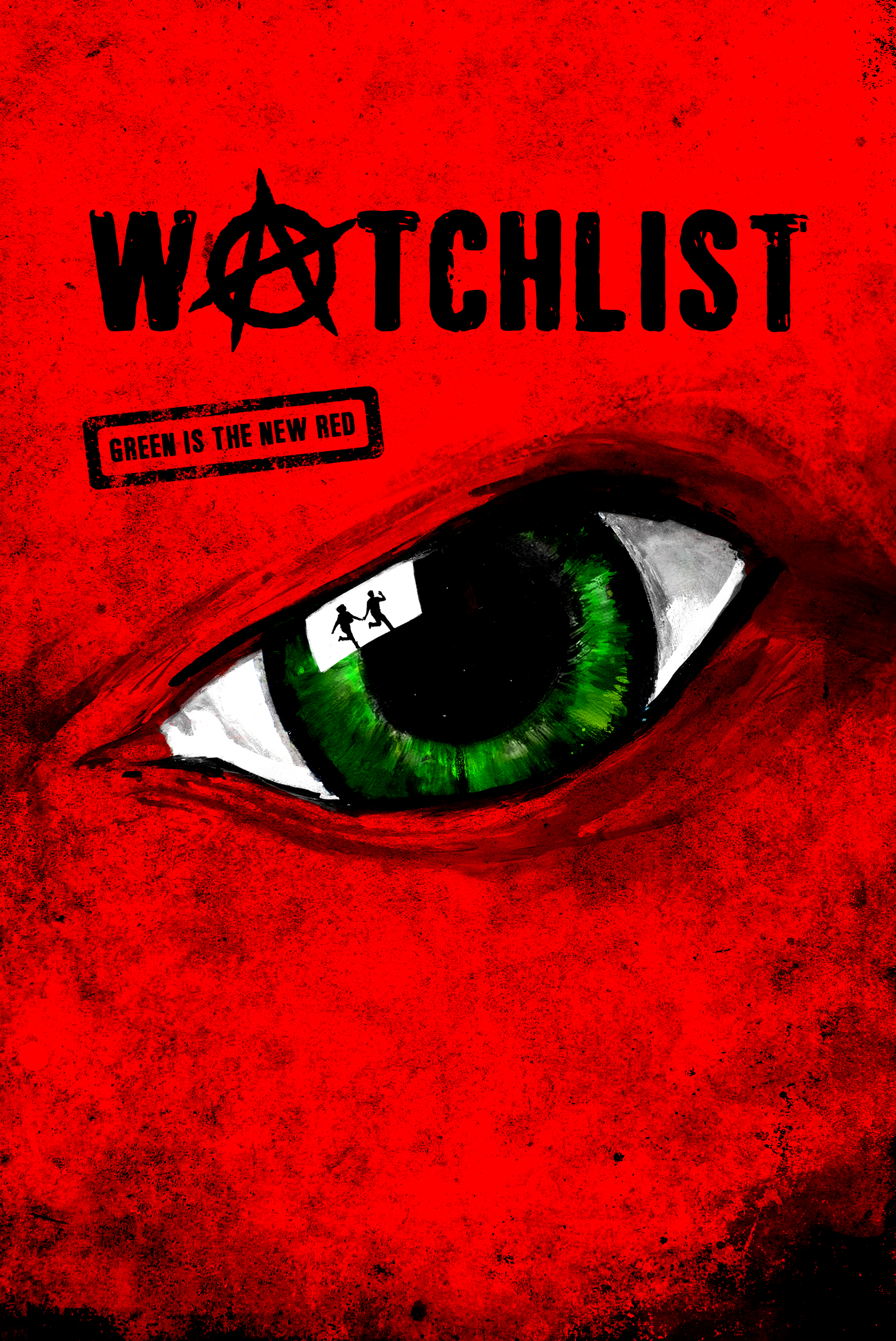
- Promotional poster for the 2021 premiere production
- Original language: English
- Written by: Alex Vickery-Howe
- Genre: Dark comedy, political satire

Premiere
- Date: 4 June 2021
- Place: Bakehouse Theatre, Adelaide, South Australia

Watchlist is a 2021 Australian stage play by Alex Vickery-Howe. It premiered on 4 June 2021 at the Bakehouse Theatre in Adelaide, produced by the South Australian Playwrights Theatre and directed by Lisa Harper Campbell. A dark comedy and political satire, the play follows Basil Pepper and Delia Dengel as their romantic lives intersect with political crises, climate activism and state surveillance. The script was published by Currency Press.

== Synopsis ==
Basil Pepper falls in love with animal rights activist Delia Dengel, who draws him into her world and forces him to confront climate collapse, his own complicity, and what ordinary people can do to save the world. Basil's best friend Roger and mother Marie attempt to disentangle him from Delia's influence, while government agents circle. As Delia's plan takes shape, each character is forced to choose between silence, dissent or self-interest.

== Production ==
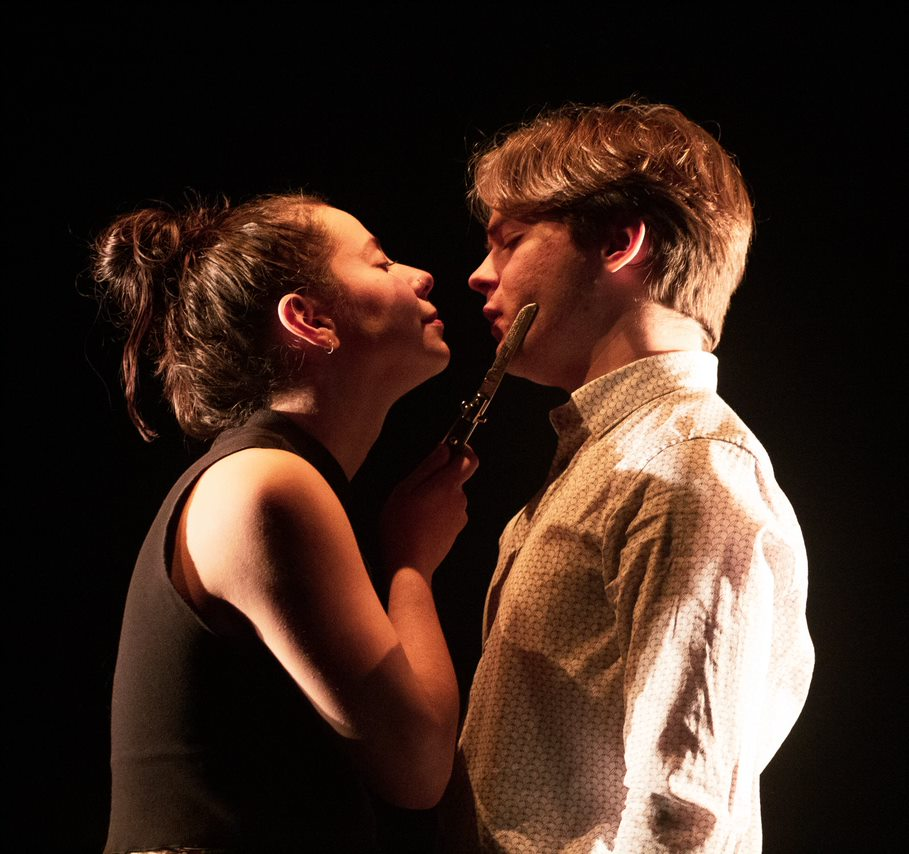
Delia (Katherine Sortini) and Basil (Gianluca Noble)

The premiere production was produced by Lucy Combe for the South Australian Playwrights Theatre and directed by Lisa Harper Campbell. The production featured lighting design and technical operation by Stephen Dean, sound design by Sascha Budimski, and stage management by Claire Miyuki Gueri.

The original cast comprised:

- Gianluca Noble as Basil
- Katherine Sortini as Delia
- Katie O'Reilly as Marie
- Eddie Morrison as Roger
- Matt Hawkins as Norman

The script was published by Currency Press.

== Reception ==
Watchlist received overwhelmingly positive critical reviews. Murray Bramwell, writing for InDaily, described the production as an "engagingly hyperactive new comic thriller" that is "amusing, ambitious, provocative", leaving the audience facing "unpalatable options".

In The Barefoot Review, Samela Harris called Watchlist a "brave, bold, agit-prop piece" and referred to Vickery-Howe as an Australian "playwright of substance".

Helen Karakulak of the Adelaide Theatre Guide praised the show as "dark and delightful", noting its treatment of climate change, surveillance culture and environmental activism. Steve Davis of The Adelaide Show Podcast found the work "darkly stupendous" and highlighted its use of wit, ideological conflict and political urgency.

Mark Wickett, writing for Stage Whispers, hailed the play as "prophetic" and "an outstanding and challenging piece of theatre", calling it "a call to arms" in response to apathy, resignation and fear of surveillance. In The Advertiser, Peter Burdon wrote that Watchlist "reminds us of the need for maturity in discerning what is fair, and what is reasonable" and affirmed "the need for that right to be respected".
