= Watchlist (NGO) =

Network of non-governmental organizations

The Watchlist on Children and Armed Conflict is a global network of local, national and international non-governmental organizations which strives to end violations against children in armed conflicts and to guarantee their rights. Together with its partners, Watchlist strategically collects and disseminates information on violations against children in conflicts in order to influence key decision-makers to create and implement programs and policies that effectively protect children. Watchlist's three main activities are Monitoring & Reporting, Advancing the Children and Armed Conflict Agenda and Strengthening Local Capacity.

== Monitoring & reporting ==
Through its country reports, Watchlist provides information on violations against children in situations of armed conflict and makes practical recommendations to policy makers to ensure protection and assistance for children. Watchlist has published reports on the situation of children in Afghanistan, Angola, Burundi, Colombia, D.R. Congo, Liberia, OPT/Israel, Myanmar, Nepal, Sri Lanka, and Sudan. Watchlist strengthens field-level monitoring, reporting and response to violations against children by building partnerships, enhancing the technical capacity of local NGOs and linking local voices with international policy makers.

== Policy Advice ==
Watchlist provides policy advice to high-level decision makers towards improving child protection programs and policies, with a focus on the UN Security Council and the UN-led Monitoring and Reporting Mechanism on Children and Armed Conflict (MRM). Watchlist has also published a series of policy papers and statements.
