= Larry Moss (acting coach) =

American actor, director, and acting coach

Larry Moss is an American actor, director and acting coach. He wrote the acting textbook, The Intent to Live, and has directed numerous theatre productions, most notably The Syringa Tree and Holding the Man.

== History ==
He first began his acting career in New York starring in Upstairs at the Downstairs and appearing on Broadway in West Side Story, Drat! The Cat!, God's Favorite, So Long, 174th Street, The Robber Bridegroom, and I Love My Wife. He switched to teaching after he started having stage fright before shows.

He taught at Juilliard and Circle in the Square in New York. He originally came to Los Angeles to train C. Thomas Howell for The Hitcher. After Helen Hunt thanked him in her acceptance speech after winning an Oscar in 1997 for As Good as It Gets, the A-List demand for Moss' coaching increased. He coached Hilary Swank in her Academy Award-winning performances in Boys Don’t Cry and Million Dollar Baby, Michael Clarke Duncan for his Oscar-nominated performance in The Green Mile, Hank Azaria's Emmy winning turn in Tuesdays with Morrie, and Tobey Maguire in Seabiscuit. He worked with Leonardo DiCaprio on his Oscar nominated and Golden Globe winning portrayals in The Aviator and The Wolf of Wall Street, as well as on DiCaprio's Oscar nominated turn in Blood Diamond, and The Departed.

Moss founded The Larry Moss Studio (now The Acting Studio at Edgemar Center for the Arts) with Michelle Danner. Larry Moss no longer teaches at the Edgemar Center for the Arts. He works internationally as a private acting coach.

== Method ==
He studied his craft under Stella Adler, Sanford Meisner and Warren Robertson.

== Director ==
Larry Moss has also directed a number of film and theatre productions including The Syringa Tree, Dos corazones both as a play and on film, Beast on the Moon, and Runt of the Litter, a 2002 play which was written and starred professional American football player Bo Eason. In 2014 Moss directed a Los Angeles production of the Australian classic Holding the Man for The Australian Theater Company. The production was met with strong critical praise citing Moss' direction and the performances of the cast. His next project will be a biographical film about Montgomery Clift entitled Monty Clift with Matt Bomer signed to play the title role.

== Credits ==
Year	Film	Role/Position	Notes
1984-1985	Sherlock Hound	Voice	Titular character
1986	The Hitcher	Production Consultant	
1990	Revenge	Dialect Coach	
1991	The Quarrel	Dialogue Coach	
1998	Lethal Weapon 4	Dialect Coach	
1998	Dos Corazones	Director	(Theater and Film)
1999	Lansky	Dialect Coach	(TV)
2000	Committed	Dialect Coach	
2000	Thirteen Days	Additional Dialect Coach	
2001	The Affair of the Necklace	Acting Consultant	
2002	The Syringa Tree	Director	(Theater / TV Movie)
2002/07	Runt of the Litter	Director	New York (Theater)
2004	Michael Blanco	The Acting Coach	
2004	Mementos	Self	(Special Thanks for Inspiration)
2006	Miracles and Mystery: Creating the Green Mile	Self	
2008	E! True Hollywood Story	Himself	
2009	The Process	Executive Producer/ Himself	
2009	Filmnut	Himself	
2010	Char·ac·ter: The Interviews	Himself	
2011	Relative Insanity	Director	
2014	Holding the Man	Director	Los Angeles (Theater)
2014	In a Dark Dark House	Director	Los Angeles (Theater)
2015	Monty Clift	Director	(Film)
