= Holding the Man =

1995 autobiography by Timothy Conigrave

- First edition
- Author: Timothy Conigrave
- Language: English
- Publisher: Penguin Group (Australia)
- Publication date: 1995
- Publication place: Australia
- Media type: Print (Paperback)
- Pages: 286 (Penguin, 1996)
- ISBN: 9-7-8014025784-7

Holding the Man is a 1995 memoir by Australian writer, actor, and activist Timothy Conigrave. It tells of his 15-year love affair with John Caleo, which started when they met in the mid-1970s at Xavier College, an all-boys Jesuit Catholic school in Melbourne, and follows their relationship through the 1990s when they both developed AIDS. The book, which won the 1995 Human Rights Award for Non-Fiction, has been adapted as a play, a docudrama, and in 2015 a film starring Ryan Corr, Craig Stott, Anthony La Paglia, Geoffrey Rush and Guy Pearce.

"Holding the Man" refers to a rule in Australian Rules Football where a defensive player is awarded a free kick for being tackled while not being in possession of the ball. Caleo, Conigrave's lover, was captain of the school football team.

Holding the Man was published in February 1995 by Penguin Books in Australia just a few months after Conigrave's death, and has since been published in Spain and North America.

== Plot ==
The story opens at Kostka, Xavier's junior (preparatory) school in Melbourne. Here, the author begins to sexually experiment with other boys, and comes to the realisation that he is gay. Several years later, on his first day at Xavier College (the Jesuit senior school), Conigrave sees John Caleo for the first time.

The two form a friendship, and at the suggestion of one of Tim's female friends, John is invited to a dinner party at Tim's house. The girls know Tim is in love with John, and "pass a kiss" around the table for his benefit.

A few weeks later, Tim rings John at home, and asks "John Caleo, will you go round with me?" The reply is an unambiguous "Yep".

The two graduate from high school in 1977, Tim attending Monash University and John studying to be a chiropractor at College. Despite parental opposition, Conigrave's eventual move to Sydney in order to attend NIDA, and youthful experimentation and infidelities, the relationship continues.

Tragically, when Tim and John finally move in together in Sydney and are genuinely happy, they are both diagnosed with HIV. The year is 1985.

Until 1990, the men have relatively mild symptoms. Sadly, in the autumn of 1991, John begins to rapidly deteriorate, suffering from lymphoma. Tim cares for his partner, whilst nursing symptoms of his own. The misery of HIV/AIDS is laid bare before the reader, with Conigrave sparing nothing in detailing the cruel progression of the disease. He watches as his lover's once-strong body is ravaged. The reader helplessly looks on as the story moves to its devastating conclusion.

At Christmas, in 1991, John is admitted to the Fairfield Hospital in Melbourne. A month later, on Australia Day 1992, he dies of an AIDS-related illness, with his lover by his side, gently stroking his hair. Nearly three years later, shortly after finishing Holding the Man, Tim Conigrave passes away in Sydney.

== Awards and notable reviews ==
Publishers have claimed that the book has won the Human Rights award for Non-Fiction in 1995, and has been listed as one of the "100 Favourite Australian Books" by the Australian society of Authors in 2003.

In 2015 UK singer Sam Smith praised the memoir on their Instagram account: "The most powerful thing for me was how this book captured what it's like to grow up gay and all those confusing scary and amazing moments I had coming out and realising who I was...this book and film pretty much changed my life".

Veteran London stage director, and director of the film, Neil Armfeld described the book as "extremely important in Australian gay history" going on to say that it "surveyed that time in Australian gay life."

Tim Robey of the Australian Telegraph described it as "Romeo and Juliet for the AIDS era.

Peter Kenneally from the Australian Book Review likens the story to Pyramus and Thisbe.

== Spanish and North American editions ==
The book was published in Spanish in 2002 under the title Amando En Tiempos De Silencio (Loving in the Days of Silence). (ISBN 84-95346-24-9).

The United States and Canadian edition of Holding the Man (with an afterword by Tommy Murphy) was released in September 2007 by Cuttyhunk Books, Boston, Massachusetts. (EAN/ISBN 978-0-97882595-9).

== Adaptations ==
Holding the Man was adapted for the stage by Tommy Murphy in 2006. The original production, directed by David Berthold, is one of the most successful Australian stage productions in recent years, playing in most Australian capital cities and London's West End.

Murphy also wrote the script for the 2015 film adaptation, directed by Neil Armfield.

A feature-length documentary about Tim and John's relationship, called Remembering the Man, was released in 2015. The documentary had its world premiere on 18 October (the 21st anniversary of Conigrave's death) at the Adelaide Film Festival where it won the audience award for best documentary.
