= Currency Press =

Specialist performing arts publisher in Australia

Currency Press Pty Ltd
- Founded: 1971
- Founders: Katharine Brisbane and Philip Parsons
- Country of origin: Australia
- Headquarters location: Surry Hills, Sydney
- Distribution: Regency Media
- Publication types: Books
- Nonfiction topics: Performing arts
- Fiction genres: Plays and screenplays
- Official website: currency.com.au

Currency Press is a leading performing arts publisher and its oldest independent publisher still active. Their list includes plays and screenplays, professional handbooks, biographies, cultural histories, critical studies and reference works.

== History ==
Currency Press was founded by Katharine Brisbane, then national theatre critic for The Australian newspaper, and her husband Philip Parsons, a lecturer in Drama at the University of New South Wales. After Philip's death in 1993, Katharine remained at the helm of the company until she retired as Publisher in December 2001 to devote her energies to Currency House, a non-profit association dedicated to the Australian performing arts. Currency press is currently run by her son Nicholas Parsons

== Description ==
Currency Press is a leading Australian specialist performing arts publisher, and its oldest independent publisher still active. It is located in the Sydney suburb of Surry Hills.

== Awards ==
In 2011, Currency Press received the Dorothy Crawford Award for Outstanding Contribution to the Profession at the AWGIE Awards.

== Selected titles ==
=== Plays ===
- Away by Michael Gow (1986) – winner of the 1986 New South Wales Premier's Literary Award – Play Award
- Blackrock by Nick Enright – It's Toby Ackland's birthday party down near the surf club – and that means grog, drugs and fun; by the morning a young girl is dead – raped and bashed with a rock. Included by the Australian Society of Authors in its list of Australia's 200 best literary works
- The Chapel Perilous by Dorothy Hewett – expressionist/epic drama. A defiant young poet engages in a quest for love and freedom, while oppressed by authority figures and disappointed by unsatisfactory lovers, ultimately finding only a limited fame.
- Cloudstreet by Nick Enright & Justin Monjo (1999) – an adaptation of Tim Winton's classic novel, and winner of the 1999 Gold AWGIE Award
- The Club by David Williamson – a play set behind the scenes of a football club; a head-on tackle of brawn versus bureaucracy
- Così by Louis Nowra – winner of the 1992 New South Wales Premier's Literary Award – Play Award
- Dead Heart by Nick Parsons – winner of the 1994 Australian Human Rights Award, the 1993 NSW State Premier's Literary Award – Play Award and the 1993 AWGIE Award for Drama
- Diving for Pearls by Katherine Thomson – winner of the 1991 Victorian Premier's Award – Louis Esson Prize for Drama
- Don's Party by David Williamson – on the night of the 1969 election, guests drink heavily and snipe about their failed aspirations and the emptiness of their lives
- The Ham Funeral by Patrick White (1948) – part lyric poem, part gothic drama, a dark and vulgar investigation of the human condition
- Holding the Man by Tommy Murphy (2007) – an adaptation of Timothy Conigrave's best-selling memoir
- Hotel Sorrento by Hannie Rayson (1990) – winner of the 1990 AWGIE Award – Stage Award, 1990 NSW Premier's Literary Award for Drama and the 1990 Green Room Award for Best Play.
- Macquarie by Alex Buzo – traces the decline of Governor Lachlan Macquarie's authority in the infant colony of New South Wales; it was the first play published by Currency Press
- The Man from Mukinupin by Dorothy Hewett (1978). Romantic romp through Dark and Light in a Western Australian wheatbelt town
- No Sugar by Jack Davis – winner of the 1992 Kate Challis RAKA Award for Drama and the 1987 WA Premier's Book Awards – Special Award
- Norm and Ahmed by Alex Buzo shows race prejudice as a profoundly irrational force in the behaviour of ordinary Australians
- Out of the Ordinary by Alex Vickery-Howe
- The Removalists by David Williamson – winner of the 1972 AWGIE Award – Best Stage Play and Best Script, as well as the Evening Standard Award for Most Promising Playwright. Included by the Australian Society of Authors in its list of Australia's 200 best literary works
- The Rivers of China by Alma De Groen (1987) – winner of the Premier's Award in both NSW and Victoria
- The Season at Sarsaparilla by Patrick White – neighbours are held by their environment, waiting with determination, but little expectation, for the inevitable cycle of birth, copulation and death
- Speaking in Tongues by Andrew Bovell (1996) – winner of the 1997 AWGIE Award – Stage Award; this is the play upon which Lantana was based
- Stolen by Jane Harrison – this tender and moving story brought the tragic history of the Stolen Generations to the Australian stage; winner of the 2002 Kate Challis RAKA Award
- Summer of the Seventeenth Doll by Ray Lawler (1955) – a defining moment in Australian theatre history, and a beacon in the Australian dramatic canon
- The Time is Not Yet Ripe by Louis Esson – a political comedy from 1912 in which the forces of socialism, feminism and conservatism fight out an election and an engagement to marry
- Watchlist by Alex Vickery-Howe
- The Woman in the Window by Alma De Groen – supported by the Literature Board of the Australia Council and short-listed for the 1999 NSW Premier’s Award for Drama

Seven of these plays have been included in the Australian Society of Authors' list of Australia's 200 best literary works.

=== Screenplays ===
- Blue Murder by Ian David – a powerful and frightening story about police corruption and Sydney's underworld
- Chopper by Andrew Dominik – goes inside the mind of Mark Brandon 'Chopper' Read, one of Australia's most notorious criminals
- Muriel's Wedding by P. J. Hogan – Muriel, an unhappy young woman in dismal surroundings, sets out to overcome obstacles such as her family, her joblessness, and her obsession with 70s glam rockers ABBA
- Rabbit Proof Fence by Christine Olsen – three Aboriginal girls are forcibly removed from their outback families in 1931 to be trained as domestic servants as part of official government policy
- Strictly Ballroom by Baz Luhrmann and Craig Pearce – an exuberant story about the struggle for love and creativity in a world limited by greed and regulation
