= Belvoir (theatre company) =

Australian theatre troupe

- Formation: 1984
- Type: Theatre group
- Location: Sydney, Australia
- Artistic director: Eamon Flack
- Website: belvoir.com.au

Belvoir is an Australian theatre company based at the Belvoir St Theatre in Sydney, Australia, originally known as Company B. Its artistic director is Eamon Flack. The theatre comprises two performing spaces: the Upstairs Theatre and the smaller Downstairs Theatre.

== History ==
=== Theatre ===
Belvoir St Theatre
- Interactive map of Belvoir St Theatre
- Location: Belvoir Street, Surry Hills, Sydney, New South Wales, Australia
- Coordinates: 33°53′20″S 151°12′33″E
- Seating type: Reserved
- Type: Indoor theatre

Construction
- Opened: 1984

Website
- belvoir.com.au

The theatre, converted from a former tomato sauce factory, opened in 1974 as the Nimrod Theatre for the Nimrod Theatre Company. The first production at the theatre was rock musical The Bacchoi. It was renamed as "'Belvoir St" in 1984 by Sue Hill and Chris Westwood when the building was purchased by a syndicate of people (Belvoir Street Theatre Pty Ltd).

Renovations costing around A$11.6 million commenced in 2005 and were delayed in 2006 with the discovery of asbestos in the building's roof. The theatre reopened in October 2006 with the Sydney season of It Just Stopped by Stephen Sewell.

The theatre contains a 330-seat auditorium called the Upstairs Theatre, and an 80-seat performing space called the Downstairs Theatre.

=== Formation of the company ===
Belvoir began, in 1984, when two syndicates were established: "Company A" with shares at $1000 each, which would own the building, and "Company B", with shares at $10 each. Company B aimed to stage theatre productions which were "contemporary, politically sharp, hard-edged Australian theatre; to develop new forms of theatrical expression; work by and about "Aboriginal Australians; work created by women; radical interpretations of the classics and work that is surprising, diverse and passionate.

=== Company ===
Belvoir was officially launched in February 1985. Later that year, Signal Driver, written by Patrick White and directed by Neil Armfield, was 'the first play produced from the ground up by Belvoir'. In the lead roles were Kerry Walker and John Gaden. The theatre poster was designed by Martin Sharp. Armfield later recalled that White, who had purchased ten shares in the theatre, was its 'greatest shareholder'.

From its foundation, Belvoir also instituted a "parity pay policy" where all employees, from actors to stage hands, received the same hourly rate of pay. This policy, which continued from 1985 to the end of the 2011 season, prompted former Australian Prime Minister Paul Keating to describe the Belvoir as "Australia's last commune".

In 2005, Belvoir temporarily moved to the Seymour Centre, Chippendale, while the theatre building underwent an $11.6 million renovation, and returned the following year.

In January 2011, Ralph Myers took over from Neil Armfield as artistic director, stating 'There's a wealth of Australian playwriting and 2500 years of great plays to draw on, I don't see a need to import new plays from overseas.' In July 2014, Myers announced that he would be stepping down from his role at the end of the 2015 season. Myers said he had 'an "ideological" commitment to the regular turnover of artistic directorships'.

Also in 2011, Belvoir appointed Simon Stone as the first director-in-residence. Stone's adaptation of Henrik Ibsen's The Wild Duck, with the Belvoir, went on to win both Helpmann and Sydney Theatre Awards, in 2011, before being taken to Oslo for a three night performance as part of the 2012 International Ibsen Festival. Stone resigned from his position in 2013, and was replaced by dual directors-in-residence Adena Jacobs and Anne-Louise Sarks.

In 2016 Myers was succeeded as artistic director by Eamon Flack. In February 2022 Carissa Licciardello and Hannah Goodwin were appointed directors-in-residence. After Licciardello's departure in 2025, Margaret Thanos was appointed Resident Artist.

In 2019 Belvoir collected an unprecedented thirteen Helpmann Awards, including Best Play, Best New Australian Work and Best Direction of a Play. In the same year actors in Belvoir productions collected Best Female Actor in a Play, Best Female Actor in a Supporting Role in a Play, Best Male Actor in a Play and Best Male Actor in a Supporting Role in a Play.

=== Past talent ===
Actors, writers and directors who have worked with Belvoir include Cate Blanchett, Simon Stone, Leah Purcell, Benedict Andrews, Mitchell Butel, Tommy Murphy, Kate Mulvany, Anne-Louise Sarks, Wesley Enoch, S. Shakthidharan, and former artistic director Neil Armfield.

== Governance and funding ==
As of 2024 the artistic director is Eamon Flack, while Aaron Beach is executive director.

In 2014 there were 600 shareholders, including noted actors, directors, writers and performers Robyn Archer, Gillian Armstrong, Peter Carey, Judy Davis, Mel Gibson, Max Gillies, Nicole Kidman, Juliet Jordan, Sam Neill, David Williamson, Neil Armfield and Colin Friels. Previous shareholders have also included Joan Sutherland, Ruth Cracknell, Gwen Plumb, Dorothy Hewett, Mike Willesee and Patrick White.

The Belvoir company receives government support for its activities from the federal government through the Major Performing Arts Board of the Australia Council for the Arts and the state government through Create NSW.

== Balnaves Fellowship ==
The Balnaves Foundation is a private philanthropic organisation founded by media executive Neil Balnaves AO in 2006.

In 2011 the Balnaves Foundation established support for two Indigenous-led works per year at Belvoir. It also created the Balnaves Award, which evolved into the Balnaves Fellowship in 2021. The fellowship is awarded to a playwright or director or writer/director, who is given A$25,000 over 12 months to create a new work, spending two days a week over 10 months as a resident artist at Belvoir.

Past recipients of the award or fellowship include:

- 2026 – Bianca Hunt
- 2025 – Hannah Belanszky
- 2023 – Guy Simon
- 2022 – Dalara Williams
- 2021 – Thomas Weatherall
- 2020 – Jorjia Gillis
- 2019 – Nathan Maynard (Note: This supported the writing of At What Cost? (see 2022 and 2023 seasons). Maynard received a Churchill Fellowship in the same year and has been named Tasmanian Aboriginal Artist of the Year twice, among other awards.)
- 2018 – Kodie Bedford
- 2017 – Megan Wilding
- 2016 – Ursula Yovich
- 2015 – Katie Beckett
- 2014 – Leah Purcell
- 2013 – Jada Alberts
- 2012 – Nakkiah Lui

== Andrew Cameron Fellowship ==
In 2018 philanthropist Andrew Cameron established support for an up-and-coming artist to have a two-year residency at Belvoir. The fellowship is awarded to a designer, director or writer/director, who is employed by the company over two years as a resident artist at Belvoir.

Past recipients of the award or fellowship include:

- 2026-27 – Mehhma Malhi
- 2024-25 – Margaret Thanos
- 2022-23 – Abbie-Lee Lewis
- 2020-21 – Hannah Goodwin
- 2018-20 – Carissa Licciardello

== Belvoir education program ==
The Belvoir's education program for students and teachers includes practical theatre workshops at the theatre or participating school, tours of backstage and behind the scenes areas of the theatre, technical tours led by a professional theatre technician and a Theatre Enrichment Program for "senior English and Drama students in Western Sydney and regional NSW". In addition, Belvoir's Outreach Program partners with local youth support organisations such as Youth Off The Streets, The John Berne School, Twenty10 and Regenesis Youth. Through the Priority Funded Schools Program Belvoir also allows selected students to attend some performances free of charge. Limited student work experience and work placement opportunities are also available.

== Seasons ==
=== 2026 ===
- Drive Your Plow Over The Bones Of The Dead by Eamon Flack after the Olga Tokarczuk novel, directed by Eamon Flack
- The Birds by Louise Fox after the Daphne Du Maurier novel, directed by Matthew Lutton
- Dear Son based on the Thomas Mayo book, directed by Isaac Drandic
- The Coconut Children by Vivian Pham, directed by Hannah Goodwin and Catherine Văn-Davies
- A Mirror by Sam Holcroft, directed by Margaret Thanos
- Runt by John Leary after the Craig Silvey novel, directed by Neil Armfield
  - Runt was placed on hiatus following Silvey's arrest and charges relating to child exploitation material.
- The Jungle and The Sea written and directed by S. Shakthidharan and Eamon Flack
- A Room With A View by Grace Chapple after the E. M. Forster novel, directed by Hannah Goodwin
- The Book of Everything by Richard Tulloch after the Guus Kuijer novel, directed by Neil Armfield. (This revival replaced Runt in the season.)

=== 2025 ===
- Jacky by Declan Furber Gillick, directed by Mark Wilson
- Big Girls Don't Cry by Dalara Williams, directed by Ian Michael
- The True History of the Life and Death of King Lear and his Three Daughters by Shakespeare, directed by Eamon Flack
- The Spare Room after the book by Helen Garner, directed by Eamon Flack
- Song of First Desire by Andrew Bovell, directed by Eamon Flack
- The Wrong Gods by S. Shakthidharan, directed by S. Shakthidharan and Hannah Goodwin
- Grief is the Thing with Feathers after the book by Max Porter, directed by Simon Phillips
- Orlando after the book by Virginia Woolf, directed by Carissa Licciardello
- The Red Shoes by Meow Meow, directed by Kate Champion

=== 2024 ===
- Tiddas by Anita Heiss, directed by Nadine McDonald-Dows & Roxanne McDonald
- August: Osage County by Tracy Letts, directed by Eamon Flack
- Tiny Beautiful Things adaptation of Cheryl Strayed's book by Nia Vardalos, directed by Lee Lewis
- Well Behaved Women music and lyrics by Carmel Dean, directed by Blazey Best
- Holding The Man adaptation of Timothy Conigrave's memoir by Tommy Murphy, directed by Eamon Flack
- The Curious Incident of the Dog in the Night-Time adaptation of Mark Haddon's novel by Simon Stephens, directed by Hannah Goodwin
- Lose to Win by Mandela Mathia, directed by Jess Arthur
- Nayika - a Dancing Girl co-created and co-directed by Nithya Nagarajan and Liv Satchell
- Counting & Cracking by S. Shakthidharan, directed by Eamon Flack
- Never Closer by Grace Chapple, directed by Hannah Goodwin

=== 2023 ===
- Blue by Thomas Weatherall, directed by Deborah Brown
- Blessed Union by Maeve Marsden, directed by Hannah Goodwin
- Into The Woods, music & lyrics by Stephen Sondheim, book by James Lapine, directed by Eamon Flack
- At What Cost? by Nathan Maynard, directed by Isaac Drandic
- Scenes From the Climate Era by David Finnigan, directed by Carissa Licciardello
- Miss Peony by Michelle Law, directed by Courtney Stewart
- The Weekend by Sue Smith, based on the book by Charlotte Wood, directed by Sarah Goodes
- Lady Day at Emerson's Bar & Grill by Lanie Robertson, directed by Mitchell Butel
- Robyn Archer: an Australian Songbook devised and performed by Robyn Archer
- The Master and Margarita adapted from the Bulgakov by Eamon Flack, directed by Eamon Flack

=== 2022 ===
- Black Brass by Mararo Wangai, directed by Matt Edgerton
- At What Cost? by Nathan Maynard, directed by Isaac Drandic, starring Luke Carroll
- Opening Night based on the screenplay by John Cassavetes, adapted & directed by Carissa Licciardello
- Wayside Bride by Alana Valentine, directed by Hannah Goodwin & Eamon Flack
- Light Shining in Buckinghamshire by Caryl Churchill, directed by Eamon Flack & Hannah Goodwin
- Tell Me I'm Here by Veronica Nadine Gleeson, based on the book by Anne Deveson, directed by Leticia Cáceres
- Sexual Misconduct of the Middle Classes by Hannah Moscovitch, directed by Petra Kalive
- The Jungle and The Sea written and directed by S. Shakthidharan and Eamon Flack
- Looking For Alibrandi by Vidya Rajan, based on the book by Melina Marchetta, directed by Stephen Nicolazzo

=== 2021 ===
- Fangirls by Yve Blake, directed by Paige Rattray
- Stop Girl by Sally Sara, directed by Anne-Louise Sarks
- A Room of One's Own by Virginia Woolf, adapted & directed by Carissa Licciardello
- The Cherry Orchard by Anton Chekhov, directed by Eamon Flack
- Miss Peony by Michelle Law, directed by Courtney Stewart
- At What Cost? by Nathan Maynard, directed by Isaac Drandic
- The Boomkak Panto by Virginia Gay, directed by Richard Carroll
- Light Shining in Buckinghamshire by Caryl Churchill, directed by Eamon Flack
- Wayside Bride by Alana Valentine, directed by Hannah Goodwin

(Miss Peony was rehearsed and produced but the season was cancelled due to Covid restrictions. At What Cost?, Light Shining in Buckinghamshire and Wayside Bride were likewise rehearsed but were postponed to the 2022 season.)

=== 2020 ===
- Every Brilliant Thing by Duncan Macmillan and Jonny Donahoe, directed by Kate Champion
- Jesus Wants Me For a Sunbeam adapted from the Peter Goldsworthy novella by Steve Rodgers, directed by Darren Yap
- Dance Nation by Clare Barron, directed by Imara Savage
- A Room of One's Own by Virginia Woolf, adapted & directed by Carissa Licciardello
- Escaped Alone by Caryl Churchill, directed by Anne-Louise Sarks
- The Jungle and The Sea by S. Shakthidharan, directed by Eamon Flack
- Miss Peony by Michelle Law, directed by Sarah Giles
- My Brilliant Career adapted from the Miles Franklin novel by Kendall Feaver, directed by Kate Champion
- Cursed! by Kodie Bedford, directed by Jason Klarwein
- Summerfolk by Maxim Gorky, adapted & directed by Eamon Flack

(Note that the outbreak of COVID-19 saw the theatre go dark after two performances of Dance Nation. The season resumed on 16 September with A Room of One's Own, followed by Cursed! and My Brilliant Career, which played into 2021. The productions of Escaped Alone and Summerfolk were cancelled.)

=== 2019 ===
- Counting & Cracking by S. Shakthidharan, directed by Eamon Flack
- The Wolves by Sarah DeLappe, directed by Jessica Arthur
- Every Brilliant Thing by Duncan Macmillan and Jonny Donahoe, directed by Kate Champion
- Barbara & The Camp Dogs by Ursula Yovich & Alana Valentine, directed by Leticia Cáceres
- Winyanboga Yurringa by Andrea James, directed by Anthea Williams
- Things I Know To Be True by Andrew Bovell, directed by Neil Armfield
- Life of Galileo by Bertolt Brecht, translated by Tom Wright, directed by Eamon Flack
- Fangirls by Yve Blake, directed by Paige Rattray
- Packer & Sons by Tommy Murphy, directed by Eamon Flack

=== 2018 ===
- My Name Is Jimi, by Jimi Bani, directed by Jimi Bani and Jason Klarwein
- My Urrwai, by Ghenoa Gela, directed by Rachael Maza
- Mother, by Daniel Keene, directed by Matt Scholten
- Single Asian Female, by Michelle Law, directed by Claire Christian
- Sami in Paradise, written and directed by Eamon Flack
- The Sugar House, by Alana Valentine, directed by Sarah Goodes
- Bliss, adapted from the Peter Carey novel by Tom Wright, directed by Matthew Lutton
- A Taste of Honey, by Shelagh Delaney, directed by Eamon Flack
- Random, by debbie tucker green, directed by Leticia Cáceres
- Calamity Jane, adapted from the Charles K. Freeman stage-play by Ronald Hanmer and Phil Park, directed by Richard Carroll
- An Enemy of the People, adapted from the Ibsen play by Melissa Reeves, directed by Anne-Louise Sarks
- The Dance of Death, by August Strindberg, directed by Judy Davis

=== 2017 ===
- Prize Fighter, by Future D. Fidel, directed by Todd MacDonald
- Which Way Home, by Katie Beckett, directed by Rachael Maza
- Boundless Plains To Share, performed by Tom Ballard
- Jasper Jones, revival of the 2016 production
- Mark Colvin's Kidney, by Tommy Murphy, directed by David Berthold
- The Dog/The Cat, by Lally Katz and Brendan Cowell, directed by Ralph Myers and Anthea Williams
- Guru of Chai, by Jacob Rajan and Justin Lewis, directed by Justin Lewis
- Mr Burns, by Anne Washburn, directed by Imara Savage
- The Rover, by Aphra Behn, directed by Eamon Flack
- Hir, by Taylor Mac, directed by Anthea Williams
- Ghosts, by Henrik Ibsen, directed by Eamon Flack
- The Bookbinder, by Ralph McCubbin Howell, directed by Hannah Smith
- Atlantis, by Lally Katz, directed by Rosemary Myers
- Barbara & The Camp Dogs, by Alana Valentine and Ursula Yovich, directed by Leticia Cáceres

=== 2016 ===
- Jasper Jones, adapted from the Craig Silvey novel by Kate Mulvany, directed by Anne-Louise Sarks
- The Blind Giant Is Dancing, by Stephen Sewell, directed by Eamon Flack
- The Great Fire, by Kit Brookman, directed by Eamon Flack
- The Events, by David Greig, directed by Clare Watson
- The Tribe, by Michael Mohammed Ahmad and Janice Muller
- Back at the Dojo, by Lally Katz, directed by Chris Kohn
- The Drover's Wife, by Leah Purcell, directed by Leticia Cáceres
- Twelfth Night, directed by Eamon Flack
- Title And Deed, by Will Eno, directed by Jada Alberts
- Ruby's Wish, by Holly Austin, Adriano Cappelletta and Jo Turner
- Faith Healer, by Brian Friel, directed by Judy Davis
- Girl Asleep, by Matthew Whittet, directed by Rosemary Myers

=== 2015 ===
- Radiance, by Louis Nowra, directed by Leah Purcell
- Kill the Messenger, by Nakkiah Lui, directed by Anthea Williams
- Blue Wizard, by Nick Coyle
- Elektra / Orestes, by Jada Alberts and Anne-Louise Sarks, directed by Anne-Louise Sarks
- The Wizard of Oz, adapted by Adena Jacobs
- Samson, by Julia-Rose Lewis, directed by Kristine Landon-Smith
- Mother Courage and Her Children, translated by Michael Gow, directed by Eamon Flack
- The Dog / The Cat, by Lally Katz and Brendan Cowell, directed by Ralph Myers
- Seventeen, by Matthew Whittet, directed by Anne-Louise Sarks
- La Traviata, by Ash Flanders and Declan Greene, directed by Declan Greene
- Ivanov, written and directed by Eamon Flack (after Chekhov)
- Mortido, by Angela Betzien, directed by Leticia Cáceres

=== 2014 ===
- Oedipus Schmoedipus, created by Zoe Coombs-Marr, Mish Grigor and Natalie Rose
- Once in Royal David's City, by Michael Gow, directed by Eamon Flack
- The Government Inspector, directed by Simon Stone
- 20 Questions, with Wesley Enoch
- Cain And Abel, created by Kate Davis and Emma Valente, directed by Emma Valente
- Brothers Wreck, by Jada Alberts, directed by Leah Purcell
- Hedda Gabler, directed by Adena Jacobs
- Nora, by Kit Brookman and Anne-Louise Sarks, directed by Anne-Louise Sarks
- Oedipus Rex, directed by Adena Jacobs
- The Glass Menagerie, directed by Eamon Flack
- Is This Thing On?, by Zoe Coombs-Marr, directed by Kit Brookman and Zoe Coombs-Marr
- A Christmas Carol, adapted by Benedict Hardie and Anne-Louise Sarks, directed by Anne-Louise Sarks
- Cinderella, by Matthew Whittet, directed by Anthea Williams

=== 2013 ===
- Peter Pan, adapted by Tommy Murphy, directed by Ralph Myers
- This Heaven, by Nakkiah Lui, directed by Lee Lewis
- Cat on a Hot Tin Roof, directed by Simon Stone
- Stories I Want to Tell You in Person, written and performed by Lally Katz, directed by Anne-Louise Sarks
- Forget Me Not, by Tom Holloway, directed by Anthea Williams
- Angels in America Part One: Millennium Approaches
- Angels in America Part Two: Perestroika, directed by Eamon Flack
- Persona, adapted and directed by Adena Jacobs
- The Baulkham Hills African Ladies Troupe, written and directed by Ros Horin
- Miss Julie, adapted by Simon Stone, directed by Leticia Caceres
- Small and Tired, written and directed by Kit Brookman
- Hamlet, directed by Simon Stone
- The Cake Man, by Robert J. Merritt, directed by Kyle J. Morrison
- Coranderrk, by Andrea James and Giordano Nanni, directed by Isaac Drandic

=== 2012 ===
- Buried City, by Raimondo Cortese, conceived and directed by Alicia Talbot
- I'm Your Man, creator and director Roslyn Oades
- Thyestes, co-written by Thomas Henning, Chris Ryan, Simon Stone and Mark Winter after Seneca, directed by Simon Stone
- Babyteeth, by Rita Kalnejais, director Eamon Flack
- Every Breath, written and directed by Benedict Andrews
- Food, by Steve Rodgers, directed by Kate Champion and Steve Rodgers
- Strange Interlude, by Simon Stone after Eugene O'Neill, directed by Simon Stone
- Old Man, by Matthew Whittet, directed by Anthea Williams
- Death of a Salesman, by Arthur Miller, directed by Simon Stone
- Conversation Piece, choreographer and director Lucy Guerin
- Private Lives, by Noël Coward, directed by Ralph Myers starring Toby Schmitz.
- Medea, by Kate Mulvany and Anne-Louise Sarks after Euripides, directed by Anne-Louise Sarks
- Beautiful One Day, created by Paul Dwyer, Eamon Flack, Rachael Maza and David Williams
- Don't Take Your Love To Town, created by Eamon Flack and Leah Purcell, based on the book Don't Take Your Love to Town by Ruby Langford Ginibi, directed by Leah Purcell

=== 2011 ===
- The Wild Duck, written and directed by Simon Stone, after Henrik Ibsen
- Jack Charles v the Crown, by Jack Charles and John Romeril, directed by Rachael Maza
- Cut, by Duncan Graham, directed by Sarah John
- The Business, based on Vassa Zheleznova by Maxim Gorky, adapted by Jonathan Gavin with Cristabel Sved, directed by Cristabel Sved
- The Kiss, by Anton Chekhov, Kate Chopin, Peter Goldsworthy and Guy de Maupassant, directed by Susanna Dowling
- The Seagull, by Anton Chekhov, directed by Benedict Andrews
- Neighbourhood Watch, by Lally Katz, directed by Simon Stone
- Windmill Baby, by David Milroy, directed by Kylie Farmer
- Human Interest Story, choreographed by Lucy Guerin
- And They Called Him Mr Glamour, by Gareth Davies, directed by Tom Wright
- Summer of the Seventeenth Doll, by Ray Lawler, directed by Neil Armfield
- The Dark Room, by Angela Betzien, directed by Leticia Cáceres
- As You Like It, by William Shakespeare, directed by Eamon Flack

=== 2010 ===
- That Face, by Polly Stenham, directed by Lee Lewis
- Love Me Tender, by Tom Holloway, directed by Matthew Lutton
- The Power of Yes, by David Hare, directed by Sam Strong
- Measure for Measure, by William Shakespeare, directed by Benedict Andrews
- Gwen in Purgatory, by Tommy Murphy, directed by Neil Armfield
- Namatjira, by Scott Rankin, directed by Scott Rankin and Wayne Blair
- The Diary of a Madman, by Nikolai Gogol (adapted by David Holman with Neil Armfield and Geoffrey Rush, directed by Armfield)
- The End by Samuel Beckett, directed by Eamon Flack
- The Bougainville Photoplay Project by Paul Dwyer, directed by David Williams

== See also ==
- NSW Philip Parsons Fellowship for Emerging Playwrights, a program formerly offered by Belvoir and Create NSW
