= Neil Armfield =

Australian theatre, opera and film director (born 1955)

Neil Armfield AO
- Born: 22 April 1955 (age 71); Sydney, New South Wales, Australia
- Education: Homebush Boys High School; University of Sydney
- Occupation: Creative director
- Organizations: Nimrod Theatre Company; State Theatre Company (SA); Queensland Theatre; Sydney Theatre Company; Seymour Group; Melbourne Theatre Company; Opera Australia; Welsh National Opera; Canadian Opera Company; Zurich Opera; English National Opera; The Royal Opera, Covent Garden; Lyric Opera of Chicago; Houston Grand Opera

Neil Geoffrey Armfield AO (born 22 April 1955) is an Australian director of theatre, film and opera.

== Biography ==
Born in Sydney, Armfield is the third and youngest son of Len, a factory worker at the nearby Arnott's Biscuits factory and Nita Armfield. He was brought up in the suburb of Concord, adjacent to Exile Bay. He was educated at the Homebush Boys High School where, in 1972, he was the vice-captain. In that year, Armfield directed the school's production of A. A. Milne's Toad of Toad Hall which garnered him the award of "Best Director" at the NSW High Schools Drama Festival. When asked in 2019: "Who or what was your biggest influence?" Armfield said; "Lindsay Daines at Homebush State High School, who encouraged my theatrical aspirations." He then went on to study at the University of Sydney, graduating in 1977, and became co-artistic director of the Nimrod Theatre Company in 1979. He joined South Australia's Lighthouse Theatre before returning to Sydney in 1985, where he was involved in the purchase of Belvoir St Theatre and the formation of Company B, becoming its first artistic director in 1994.

Armfield was the subject of a severe gay-hate attack in May 1986 in Sydney's Moore Park which the NSW Police failed to investigate.

In April 2008 he was selected as a participant in the Towards a creative Australia strand of the Australia 2020 Summit. Armfield announced in 2009 that the 2010 season would be his last as Belvoir artistic director, but he subsequently directed under his successor as artistic director Ralph Myers.

Armfield was appointed joint artistic director of the Adelaide Festival with Rachel Healy in 2017, with their original two-year term extended twice to 2023. This made them the longest serving artistic directors in the Festival's history.

== Company B work ==
For Company B, which became the Belvoir St Theatre in Sydney, he has directed

- Signal Driver
- State of Shock
- Aftershocks
- Master Builder
- The Diary of a Madman
- Diving for Pearls
- The Tempest
- Ghosts
- Hate
- No Sugar
- Hamlet
- The Blind Giant Is Dancing
- The Alchemist
- WASP
- The Seagull
- The Governor's Family
- As You Like It
- The Judas Kiss
- The Small Poppies
- Suddenly Last Summer
- The Marriage of Figaro
- Emma's Nose
- Aliwa
- My Zinc Bed
- Waiting for Godot
- The Underpants
- The Lieutenant of Inishmore
- Gulpilil
- The Spook
- The Fever
- Cloudstreet
- Picasso at the Lapin Agile
- Dead Heart
- A Cheery Soul
- Night on Bald Mountain
- Stuff Happens
- The Adventures of Snugglepot &
  Cuddlepie and Little Ragged Blossom
- Keating!
- Summer of the Seventeenth Doll

== Opera Australia work ==
For Opera Australia he has directed works such as Jenůfa, The Eighth Wonder, Tristan und Isolde and Billy Budd. In 2013, he directed Opera Australia's first full-length presentation of Richard Wagner's Ring Cycle, in Melbourne.

== Companies worked with ==
- Nimrod Theatre Company
- State Theatre Company of South Australia
- Queensland Theatre Company
- Sydney Theatre Company
- Seymour Group
- Melbourne Theatre Company
- Opera Australia
- Welsh National Opera
- Canadian Opera Company
- Zurich Opera
- English National Opera
- The Royal Opera, Covent Garden
- Lyric Opera of Chicago
- Houston Grand Opera
- Pinchgut Opera

== Film ==
- 1986: Twelfth Night
- 1991: The Castanet Club
- 2006: Candy
- 2015: Holding the Man

== Awards and honours ==
=== Australian ===
- Officer of the Order of Australia for "... service to the arts, nationally and internationally, as a director of theatre, opera and film, and as a promoter of innovative Australian productions including Australian Indigenous drama." (January 2007)
- Honorary Doctor of Literature at the University of Sydney (April 2006)
- Sydney Theatre Critics Circle Award for Best Director and Best Production
- 1989, Major Award for Significant Contribution to Sydney Theatre
- Several Green Room Awards
- AFI Award for Best Director (Mini-series Edens Lost)
- Several Helpmann Awards
- Sidney Myer Performing Arts Award for Outstanding Achievement in the Performing Arts in Australia

=== International ===
- Dublin Festival, Best Production (Cloudstreet)
- Dora Mavor Moore Award, Canada, Best Director and Best Musical for Billy Budd
- Barclays Best Opera Production Award (Billy Budd)
