= David Berthold =

Australian theatre director

David Berthold is an Australian theatre and festival director, who has also been artistic director of several major Australian arts organisations.

== Early life and education ==
David Berthold was born in Maitland, New South Wales.

He spent some years training as an opera singer, and won the Joan Sutherland Scholarship at the Sydney Opera House..

== Career ==
Berthold has been active in theatre since at least 1984, acting and directing. He began his career as an actor, one of his earliest roles being in the Hunter Valley Theatre Company's production of David Williamson's The Perfectionist in April to May 1984.

He has been director of several theatre companies in Australia. He was associate director of Sydney Theatre Company from 1994 to 1999, before being appointed artistic director and CEO of Australian Theatre for Young People in 1999. He then took up the post of artistic director and CEO of Griffin Theatre Company from 2003 until 2006.

Between 2008 and 2019, Berthold led major arts organisations in Brisbane. He was artistic director and CEO of La Boite Theatre Company from 2008 until 2014.

He was then appointed as artistic director of the Brisbane Festival, serving in that role from 2015 until 2019. He transformed the festival into Australia's largest major international arts festival, presenting more works to more people than any other.

Since January 2020, Berthold has been artistic director-in-residence at the National Institute of Dramatic Art in Sydney.

== Other activities ==
He was on the judging panels of Time Out's 2021 Future Shapers Awards, Nick Enright Prize for Playwriting in 2020/21, and the Sydney Theatre Awards in 2023.

As of September 2023 Berthold was a member of the NSW Government's Theatre and Musical Theatre Arts Advisory Board.

As of September 2024 he is on the boards of Hothouse Theatre and Australian Plays Transform. He is also a trustee of the Rodney Seaborn Playwrights Award.

== Recognition and awards ==
In 2010, Berthold was nominated for a BroadwayWorld UK Award for Best Direction of a Play, for his London West End production Holding the Man.

In 2010, Berthold won a Matilda Award for his "repositioning of La Boite Theatre Company and his direction of Hamlet".

== Productions ==
From 1984 until the present (2024), Berthold has assumed the role of actor, adaptor, artistic director, assistant director, director, and co-director on numerous productions, notably with the Sydney, Griffin, La Boite, and Queensland Theatre companies as well as the Australian Theatre for Young People.
