= Chimerica (disambiguation) =

Chimerica is a term describing economic relations between China and the US.

Chimerica may also refer to:

- Chimerica (play), a play by Lucy Kirkwood
- Chimerica (TV series), a 2019 British drama based on Kirkwood's play
- Chimerica, a fictional Central American country that serves as the setting for Hidden Agenda
