= Helpmann Award for Best Direction of a Play =

Annual Australian theatre award

- Awarded for: Best Direction of a Play
- Location: Australia
- Presented by: Live Performance Australia
- Currently held by: Leticia Cáceres for The Drover's Wife (2017)
- Website: HelpmannAwards.com.au

The Helpmann Award for Best Direction of a Play is a theatre award, presented by Live Performance Australia (LPA) at the annual Helpmann Awards since 2001. In the following list winners are listed first and marked in gold, in boldface, and the nominees are listed below with no highlight. Neil Armfield has won the most awards, with four, and is tied the most nominated director with Simon Phillips, both gandering nine nominations.

== Winners and nominees ==
Winners are listed first and marked in a separate colour.

Year	Director	Production
**2001** (1st)
**2001** (1st)	Benedict Andrews	La Dispute
**2001** (1st)	Kate Cherry	Life After George
**2001** (1st)	Neil Armfield	The Small Poppies
**2001** (1st)	Simon Phillips	Measure For Measure
**2002** (2nd)
**2002** (2nd)	Neil Armfield	Cloudstreet
**2002** (2nd)	Rodney Fisher	Master Class
**2002** (2nd)	Simon Phillips	The Tempest
**2002** (2nd)	Benedict Andrews	Three Sisters
**2003** (3rd)
**2003** (3rd)	Michael Blakemore	Copenhagen
**2003** (3rd)	Simon Phillips	The Blue Room
**2003** (3rd)	Simon Phillips	Great Expectations
**2003** (3rd)	Neil Armfield	Waiting for Godot
**2004** (4th)
**2004** (4th)	Simon Phillips	Inheritance
**2004** (4th)	John Bell	The Servant of Two Masters
**2004** (4th)	Julian Meyrick	Frozen
**2004** (4th)	Neil Armfield	The Lieutenant of Inishmore
**2005** (5th)
**2005** (5th)	Jim Sharman	Three Furies
**2005** (5th)	Robyn Nevin	Hedda Gabler
**2005** (5th)	Michael Blakemore	Democracy
**2005** (5th)	Wesley Enoch	Riverland
**2006** (6th)
**2006** (6th)	Marion Potts	The Goat, or Who Is Sylvia?
**2006** (6th)	Simon Phillips	King Lear
**2006** (6th)	Ariane Mnouchkine	Le Dernier Caravansérail
**2006** (6th)	Declan Donnellan	Twelfth Night
**2007** (7th)
**2007** (7th)	Barrie Kosky	The Lost Echo
**2007** (7th)	Benedict Andrews	The Season At Sarsaparilla
**2007** (7th)	Michael Hill	Waiting for Godot
**2007** (7th)	Wesley Enoch	Parramatta Girls
**2008** (8th)
**2008** (8th)	Neil Armfield	Toy Symphony
**2008** (8th)	Benedict Andrews	Who's Afraid of Virginia Woolf?
**2008** (8th)	Barrie Kosky	The Tell-Tale Heart
**2008** (8th)	John Tiffany	Black Watch
**2009** (9th)
**2009** (9th)	Benedict Andrews	War of the Roses
**2009** (9th)	Barrie Kosky	Women of Troy
**2009** (9th)	Peter Evans	Blackbird
**2009** (9th)	Neil Armfield	Scorched
**2010** (10th)
**2010** (10th)	Simon Phillips	Richard III
**2010** (10th)	Thomas Ostermeier	Hamlet
**2010** (10th)	Michael Kantor	Happy Days
**2010** (10th)	Neil Armfield	The Book of Everything
**2011** (11th)
**2011** (11th)	Neil Armfield	The Diary of a Madman
**2011** (11th)	Simon Stone	The Wild Duck
**2011** (11th)	Wesley Enoch	Waltzing The Wilarra
**2011** (11th)	Benedict Andrews	Measure for Measure
**2012** (12th)
**2012** (12th)	Benedict Andrews	Gross und Klein (Big and Small)
**2012** (12th)	Rachael Maza	Jack Charles v The Crown
**2012** (12th)	Simon Phillips	Songs for Nobodies
**2012** (12th)	Sam Strong	The Boys
**2013** (13th)
**2013** (13th)	Neil Armfield	The Secret River
**2013** (13th)	Lee Lewis	The School for Wives
**2013** (13th)	Anne-Louise Sarks	Medea
**2013** (13th)	Rosemary Myers	School Dance
**2014** (14th)
**2014** (14th)	Michael Kantor	The Shadow King
**2014** (14th)	Andrew Upton	Waiting For Godot
**2014** (14th)	Ivo van Hove	Roman Tragedies
**2014** (14th)	Sam Strong	The Floating World
**2015** (15th)
**2015** (15th)	Kip Williams	Suddenly Last Summer
**2015** (15th)	Andrew Upton	Endgame
**2015** (15th)	Sarah Goodes	Switzerland
**2015** (15th)	Clare Watson	What Rhymes With Cars And Girls
**2016** (16th)
**2016** (16th)	Lee Lewis	The Bleeding Tree
**2016** (16th)	Kip Williams	Love and Information
**2016** (16th)	Eamon Flack	Ivanov
**2016** (16th)	Simon Phillips	North by Northwest
**2017** (17th)
**2017** (17th)	Leticia Caceres	The Drover's Wife
**2017** (17th)	Kip Williams	Chimerica
**2017** (17th)	Judy Davis	Faith Healer
**2017** (17th)	Susie Dee	SH*T
**2018** (18th)
**2018** (18th)	Sarah Goodes	The Children
**2018** (18th)	Matthew Lutton	The Real and Imagined History of the Elephant Man
**2018** (18th)	Kip Williams	Cloud Nine
**2018** (18th)	Kip Williams	The Resistible Rise of Arturo Ui
**2019** (19th)
**2019** (19th)	Eamon Flack and S. Shakthidharan	Counting and Cracking
**2019** (19th)	Declan Greene	Blackie Blackie Brown: The Traditional Owner of Death
**2019** (19th)	Imara Savage	Saint Joan
**2019** (19th)	Kip Williams	The Harp in the South: Part One and Part Two

== See also ==
- Helpmann Awards
