= Eryn Jean Norvill =

Australian stage and television actress

- Born: c.1984 New South Wales, Australia
- Education: Victorian College of the Arts (VCA); École Philippe Gaulier
- Occupation: Actor

Eryn Jean Norvill (born c.1984), sometimes spelt Eryn-Jean Norvill, is an Australian stage and television actress. She has mostly performed in Sydney Theatre Company productions, and frequently collaborated with STC artistic director Kip Williams. In May 2022 she played all 26 characters in an adaptation of The Picture of Dorian Gray.

== Early life and education ==
Norvill was born in around 1984, and grew up in Sydney. As a child, she loved watching Star Trek and Star Wars, and enjoyed reading science fiction and fantasy fiction. As a school student, she attended classes at the now-defunct Australian Youth Theatre, and decided to make a career in theatre.

After leaving school, Norvill auditioned for the National Institute of Dramatic Art, but was not accepted, so she tried out for the PACT Centre for Emerging Artists' imPACT ensemble in 2003, also in Sydney. There she was successful, and went on to study at the Victorian College of the Arts (VCA) in Melbourne.

== Career ==
After graduation from VCA, Norvill toured as part of Bell Shakespeare's Actors at Work program, which she did not enjoy but taught her rigour. It was there that she met Emily Tomlins, with whom she later performed in a clowning act, A Tiny Chorus, which played at the Melbourne, Sydney and Adelaide Fringe festivals.

She then joined a collective of theatre creatives known as the Hayloft Project, headed by actor/ playwright/ director Simon Stone, and worked with them from around 2007 to 2010. She also had a role in Kenneth Lonergan's Lobby Hero at Red Stitch Actors Theatre, before moving back to Sydney and landing the role of trainee detective Graves in the long-running TV soap Home and Away.

In 2011, Norvill had her first big stage role, as Ophelia, playing opposite Ewen Leslie as Hamlet in the Melbourne Theatre Company's production, directed by Simon Phillips. The following year, she played supporting roles in MTC's Top Girls and Griffin Theatre Company's The Boys.

A year after meeting Kip Williams when playing in a small indie production, the two participated in a Sydney Theatre Company (STC) workshop run by UK director Declan Donnellan, the first of several collaborations. Williams cast Norvill as Juliet in his 2013 production of Romeo and Juliet for STC.

She then won a grant to travel to Berlin and France, and attended a clowning course at the École Philippe Gaulier. Returning to Australia, she was given several mainstage roles, including with STC (which was headed by Kip Williams as artistic director from 2016).

In late 2015 Norvill was awarded a Marten Bequest Travelling Scholarship, funding travel to Los Angeles, where she studied improv at The Groundlings school for two months.

Returning to Australia, Norvill took the role as Cordelia, playing opposite Geoffrey Rush in King Lear, in Neil Armfield's production for STC, in November 2015.

In August 2017 she once again partnered with Emily Tomlins, along with Melbourne Theatre Company Elbow Room (of which Tomlins is co-director), to present Niche, a sci-fi thriller, which drew glowing reviews.

After her involvement in a court case involving Geoffrey Rush had taken a toll on her personal and professional life, Norvill travelled to Japan with Tomlins in 2019 and stayed on for some time on her own. Back in Australia, she again collaborated with Williams, this time as dramaturg, on an STC production of Lord of the Flies. She also recorded two audiobooks.

In the STC's adaptation of Oscar Wilde's Picture of Dorian Gray, Norvill played 26 characters. The first season ran from 2020 to 2021, and she reprised the role in 2022, in a performance that was highly praised, with one reviewer suggesting that she could be the new Cate Blanchett.

In late 2024, Norvill was named in series three of Foxtel / Binge series The Twelve.

== Recognition and awards ==
- 2015: Sydney Theatre Awards, Best Actress in a Leading Role in a Mainstage Production, for Suddenly Last Summer
- A painting of Norvill by Oliver Watts was entered for the Archibald Prize in 2021. Watts has painted her many times, and she has featured in his video works.

== Advocacy ==
In 2017, Norvill and Sophie Ross founded Safe Theatres Australia, to combat "sexual harassment, discrimination and bullying in the theatre sector". Their advocacy led the Media Entertainment and Arts Alliance (MEAA) to commission a survey about these issues, and in March 2018 the pair hosted the inaugural Safe Theatres Forum.

== Legal proceedings ==
On 30 November 2017, as Norvill was in the middle of the Three Sisters season, The Daily Telegraph published a front-page article alleging that Rush engaged in "inappropriate behaviour" on stage with a co-star during the STC's 2015 production of King Lear. The story contained no corroboration for the allegations, though the STC divulged to the paper that they had received a complaint about alleged sexual harassment by Rush from Norvill. Rush denied the allegations and in December filed a defamation suit with the Federal Court against Nationwide News, charging that The Telegraph had "made false, pejorative and demeaning claims". Norvill testified at the trial, which began in October 2018. Justice Michael Wigney ruled in favour of Rush in April 2019, saying that her evidence was "not credible or reliable and contradicted by other members of the cast". He criticised The Telegraph for irresponsible journalism and ordered the paper to pay Rush A$2.87m.

The trial and the media coverage of it took its toll on Norvill, causing her to withdraw from a starring role in a March 2018 Melbourne Theatre Company's production of Mike Leigh's comedy Abigail's Party.

== Theatre ==
=== As actor ===
| Year | Title | Role | Notes | Ref |
|---|---|---|---|---|
| 2003 | Brokenville | | Wharf Theatre, Sydney with ATYP | |
| 2007 | A Man for All Seasons | | University of Melbourne & VIC regional tour with Complete Works Theatre Company | |
| 2008 | Chekhov Re-Cut: Platonov | | The Hayloft, Melbourne | |
| 2008 | Three Sisters | | Arts House Meat Market, Melbourne | |
| 2009 | Lobby Hero | Dawn | Red Stitch Actors Theatre, Melbourne | |
| 2009 | Mercy | | Fortyfivedownstairs, Melbourne with Shy Tiger Productions | |
| 2011 | Hamlet | Ophelia | Southbank Theatre, Melbourne with MTC | |
| 2012 | The Boys | Nola | Stables Theatre, Sydney with Griffin Theatre Company for Sydney Festival | |
| 2012 | Truck Stop | Sam | Seymour Centre, Sydney with Q Theatre Company | |
| 2012 | Top Girls | Angie | Southbank Theatre, Melbourne with MTC | |
| 2012 | Romeo and Juliet | Juliet | Sydney Opera House with STC | |
| 2014 | The Government Inspector | Eryn | Malthouse Theatre, Melbourne, Belvoir St Theatre, Sydney | |
| 2014 | Cyrano | Roxane | Sydney Theatre Company | |
| 2015 | Suddenly Last Summer | Catherine | Sydney Opera House | |
| 2015 | King Lear | Cordelia | STC | |
| 2016 | All My Sons | Ann | Roslyn Packer Theatre, Sydney with STC | |
| 2017 | Niche | Niche | Northcote Town Hall, Melbourne with MTC Elbow Room & Darebin Arts Speakeasy | |
| 2017 | Three Sisters | Masha | Sydney Opera House with STC | |
| 2018 | Abigail's Party | Beverly | Southbank Theatre, Melbourne | |
| 2018 | Melancholia | Justine | Malthouse Theatre, Melbourne | |
| 2019 | Anthem | Various characters | Playhouse, Melbourne with Performing Lines for Melbourne International Arts Festival | |
| 2020 | Fidelio | Narrator | Perth Concert Hall with West Australian Symphony Orchestra | |
| 2020–2022 | Picture of Dorian Gray | Dorian Gray | Heath Ledger Theatre, Perth, Roslyn Packer Theatre, Sydney, Her Majesty's Theatre, Adelaide, Playhouse, Melbourne with STC | |
| 2023 | The Confessions | Alice | Odéon-Théâtre de l'Europe | |

=== As crew ===
| Year | Title | Role | Notes |
|---|---|---|---|
| 2009 | A Tiny Chorus | Devisor / Writer / Dramaturg | Meeting Room, Melbourne with Elbow Room Productions for Melbourne Fringe Festival |
| 2017 | Niche | Creator / Soundtrack / Music | Northcote Town Hall, Melbourne with MTC Elbow Room & Darebin Arts Speakeasy |
| 2019 | Lord of the Flies | Dramaturg | Roslyn Packer Theatre, Sydney with STC |
| 2020–2022 | Picture of Dorian Gray | Dramaturg / Creative Associate | Heath Ledger Theatre, Perth, Roslyn Packer Theatre, Sydney, Her Majesty's Theatre, Adelaide, Playhouse, Melbourne with STC |

== Filmography ==
=== Television ===
| Year | Title | Role | Notes | Ref |
|---|---|---|---|---|
| 2010 | Home and Away | Detective Graves | 14 episodes | |
| 2012 | Death Star PR | Green | 6 episodes | |
| 2021 | Preppers | Kirby | 6 episodes | |
| 2022 | It's Fine, I'm Fine | Jeanne | 1 episode | |
| 2023 | Love Me | Julia | 2 episodes | |
| 2025 | The Twelve | Amanda Taylor | Season 3: "Cape Rock Killer" | |

=== Film ===
| Year | Title | Role | Notes |
|---|---|---|---|
| 2006 | Blood Ballad | Natalie | Short |
| 2006 | God's Algorithm | Peaches | Short |
| 2010 | Tethered | Erin | Short |
| 2013 | Felony | Police | |
| 2014 | Test Drive | Sadie | Short |
| 2015 | How I Won the Miles Franklin Book Award | Edith | Short |
| 2018 | Shadows | | |
