= The Picture of Dorian Gray (play) =

2020 stage play by Kip Williams

- Original language: English
- Written by: Kip Williams
- Genre: Drama

Premiere
- Date: November 24, 2020
- Place: Roslyn Packer Theatre
- Official website

The Picture of Dorian Gray is a stage play written by Australian writer Kip Williams, based on the 1891 novel of the same name by Oscar Wilde. The play has one performer portraying 26 roles from the original novel.

== Production history ==
=== Sydney (2020) ===
Kip Williams wrote the play during the COVID-19 pandemic and it premiered for the Sydney Theatre Company on November 24, 2020 at the Roslyn Packer Theatre, starring Eryn Jean Norvill and directed by Williams. The show received positive critical and audience reception and was extended from its original run until it closed on January 9, 2021. The show then toured in Australia, including a run at the Adelaide Festival in 2022.

=== West End (2024) ===
The show transferred to the West End in London in 2024, with Sarah Snook in the lead role. The show opened at the Theatre Royal Haymarket on February 6, 2024 and closed on May 11, 2024. At the 2024 Laurence Olivier Awards, the show won for Best Actress and Best Costume Design.

=== Broadway (2025) ===
The show next transferred to Broadway at the Music Box Theatre, with previews beginning on March 10, 2025 and opening on March 27, 2025 again starring Snook and directed by Kip Williams. The show closed on June 29, 2025.

The production received a Drama League Award nomination for Outstanding Production of a Play, in addition to Williams receiving a nomination for Outstanding Direction of a Play, and Snook receiving a nomination for Distinguished Performance.

== Cast and characters ==
Character	Sydney (2020)	West End (2024)	Broadway (2025)
Dorian Gray, et al.	Eryn Jean Norvill	Sarah Snook	Sarah Snook

== Awards and nominations ==
=== Original Sydney production ===
Year	Award	Category	Nominee	Result	Ref.
2022	Sydney Theatre Awards	Best Mainstage Production		Won	
2022	Sydney Theatre Awards	Best Direction of a Mainstage Production	Kip Williams	Won	
2022	Sydney Theatre Awards	Best Performance in a Leading Role in a Mainstage Production	Eryn Jean Norvill	Won	
2022	Sydney Theatre Awards	Best Stage Design of a Mainstage Production	Marg Horwell and David Bergman	Won	
2022	Sydney Theatre Awards	Best Lighting Design of a Mainstage Production	Nick Schlieper	Nominated	
2022	Sydney Theatre Awards	Best Sound Design of a Mainstage Production	Clemence Williams	Nominated	
2023	Green Room Awards (Theatre Companies category)	Best Production		Won	
2023	Green Room Awards (Theatre Companies category)	Outstanding Direction	Kip Williams	Won	
2023	Green Room Awards (Theatre Companies category)	Outstanding Performance	Eryn Jean Norvill	Won	
2023	Green Room Awards (Theatre Companies category)	Outstanding Set Design	Marg Horwell and David Bergman	Nominated	
2023	Green Room Awards (Theatre Companies category)	Outstanding Costume Design	Marg Horwell	Won	
2023	Green Room Awards (Theatre Companies category)	Outstanding Ensemble		Nominated	

=== Original West End production ===
Year	Award	Category	Nominee	Result	Ref.
2024	Laurence Olivier Awards	Best Actress	Sarah Snook	Won	
2024	Laurence Olivier Awards	Best Costume Design	Marg Horwell	Won	
2024	The Stage Debut Awards	Best Creative West End Debut (Direction)	Kip Williams	Nominated	
2025	WhatsOnStage Awards	Best Costume Design	Marg Horwell	Nominated	
2025	WhatsOnStage Awards	Best Video Design	David Bergman	Nominated	
2025	WhatsOnStage Awards	Best Wigs, Hair and Make Up Design	Marg Horwell	Nominated	

=== Original Broadway production ===
Year	Award	Category	Nominee	Result	Ref.
2025	Tony Awards	Best Actress in a Play	Sarah Snook	Won	
2025	Tony Awards	Best Direction of a Play	Kip Williams	Nominated	
2025	Tony Awards	Best Scenic Design in a Play	David Bergman and Marg Horwell	Nominated	
2025	Tony Awards	Best Costume Design in a Play	Marg Horwell	Won	
2025	Tony Awards	Best Lighting Design in a Play	Nick Schlieper	Nominated	
2025	Tony Awards	Best Sound Design in a Play	Clemence Williams	Nominated	
2025	Drama Desk Awards	Outstanding Lead Performance in a Play	Sarah Snook	Won	
2025	Drama Desk Awards	Outstanding Director of a Play	Kip Williams	Nominated	
2025	Drama Desk Awards	Outstanding Sound Design in a Play	Clemence Williams	Nominated	
2025	Drama Desk Awards	Outstanding Projection and Video Design	David Bergman	Won	
2025	Drama Desk Awards	Unique Theatrical Experience		Won	
2025	Drama League Awards	Outstanding Production of a Play		Nominated	
2025	Drama League Awards	Outstanding Direction of a Play	Kip Williams	Nominated	
2025	Drama League Awards	Distinguished Performance	Sarah Snook	Nominated	
2025	Outer Critics Circle Awards	Outstanding Solo Performance	Sarah Snook	Won	
2025	Outer Critics Circle Awards	Outstanding Video/Projections	David Bergman	Won	
2025	Theatre World Awards	Outstanding Broadway or Off-Broadway Debut Performance	Sarah Snook	Honored	
2025	Broadway.com Audience Choice Awards	Favorite New Play		Nominated	
2025	Broadway.com Audience Choice Awards	Favorite Leading Actress in a Play	Sarah Snook	Nominated	
2025	Broadway.com Audience Choice Awards	Favorite Breakthrough Performance (Female)	Sarah Snook	Nominated	
2025	Broadway.com Audience Choice Awards	Performance of the Year (Play)	Sarah Snook	Nominated	
2025	Dorian Theater Awards	Outstanding Broadway Play		Nominated	
2025	Dorian Theater Awards	Outstanding Lead Performance in a Broadway Play	Sarah Snook	Won	

== Film adaptation ==
In April 2024, Cate Blanchett's film production company Dirty Films acquired the screening rights to The Picture of Dorian Gray.
