= Kip Williams =

Australian theatre director

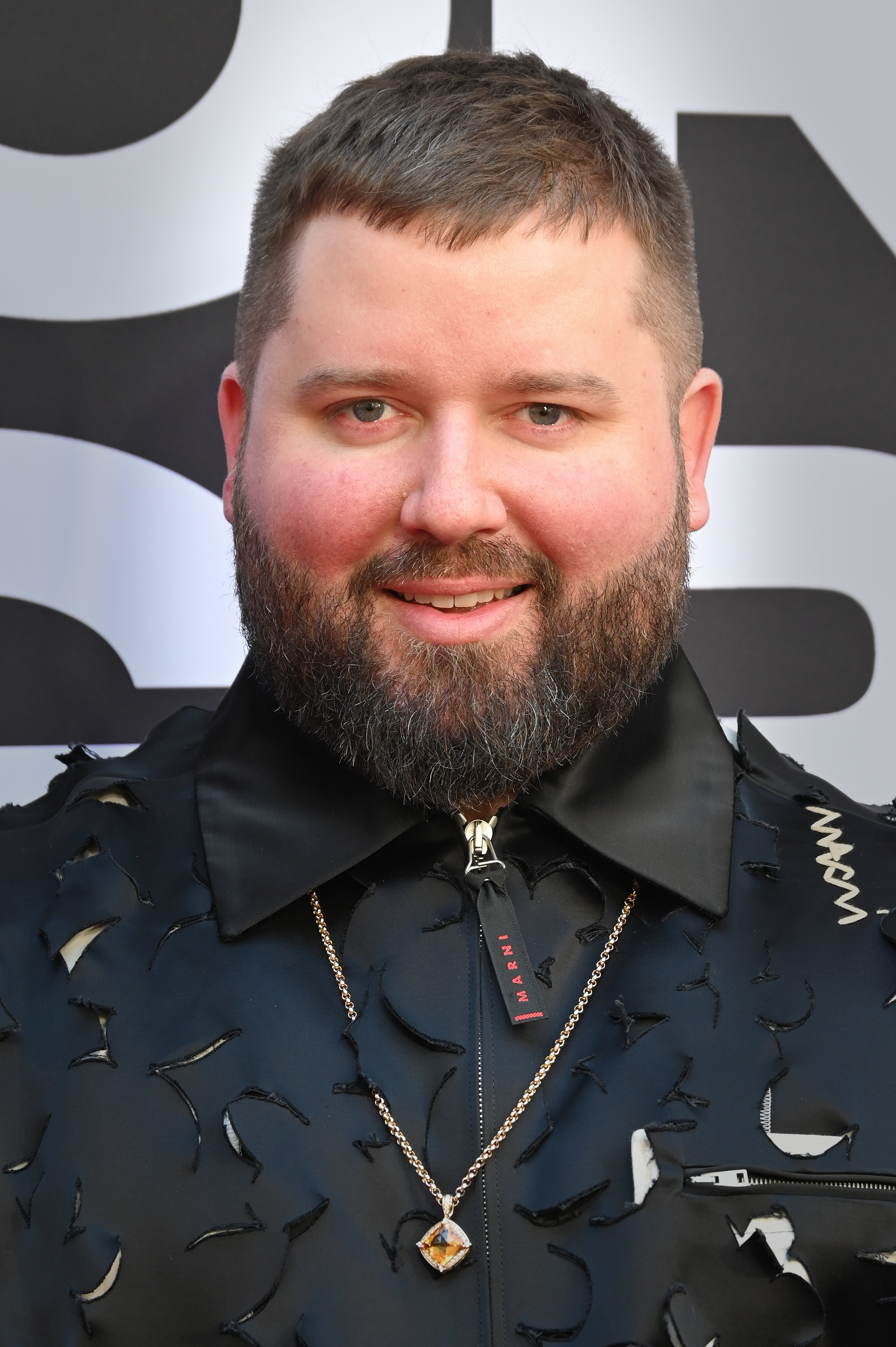
- Williams in 2025
- Education: National Institute of Dramatic Art; University of Sydney
- Occupations: Theatre and opera director
- Known for: Artistic director of Sydney Theatre Company
- Notable work: The Picture of Dorian Gray; The Harp in the South; The Resistible Rise of Arturo Ui; Strange Case of Dr Jekyll and Mr Hyde

Kip Williams is an Australian Tony-nominated director and writer of theatre and opera.

Williams was artistic director of Sydney Theatre Company from 2016 to 2024. His appointment at age 30 made him the youngest artistic director in the company's history.

== Life and career ==
Williams is a graduate of the National Institute of Dramatic Art (NIDA), and the University of Sydney. He is the grandson of actress Wendy Playfair, and the nephew of folk musician Sean Cullip.

Williams first joined Sydney Theatre Company (STC) in January 2012, when he was appointed Directing Associate by then Artistic Directors Cate Blanchett and Andrew Upton. He was subsequently made Resident Director in 2013, before being named artistic director and Co-CEO in November 2016, a role in which he served until November 2024, marking 13 years with the company.

Williams won the 2015 Helpmann Award for Best Direction of a Play for his STC production of Tennessee Williams's Suddenly Last Summer.

He has won the Green Room Award for Best Director twice, first in 2016 for his production of Miss Julie for Melbourne Theatre Company, and again in 2023 with STC's The Picture of Dorian Gray.

He is a three-time winner of the Sydney Theatre Award for Best Director. His first win came in 2018 for his STC production of The Harp in the South, his second in 2021 for STC's The Picture of Dorian Gray, and his third in 2022 for STC's Strange Case of Dr Jekyll and Mr Hyde.

Williams made his West End and Broadway debuts with his adaptation of The Picture of Dorian Gray, for which he was nominated for the Tony Award for Best Direction of a Play, the Drama League Award for both Outstanding Direction of a Play and Outstanding Production of a Play, the Drama Desk Award for Outstanding Director of a Play, and The Stage Debut Award for Creative West End Debut (Direction), and for which he won the Drama Desk Award for Unique Theatrical Experience.

=== Theatre ===
Williams has directed both on Broadway and in the West End, as well as for many leading theatre companies and festivals around the world, including Sydney Theatre Company, Donmar Warehouse, Melbourne Theatre Company, Malthouse Theatre, Adelaide Festival, Perth Festival, Sydney Opera House, Auckland Arts Festival, Arts Centre Melbourne, and Rising Festival.

Williams' first production for Sydney Theatre Company came in 2012, where at age 25 he directed Dylan Thomas's Under Milk Wood, at the Sydney Opera House, starring Jack Thompson. In 2013 he adapted and directed a reimagining of Romeo and Juliet, focussing the text on Juliet, again at the Sydney Opera House; as well as an all female production of William Golding's Lord of the Flies at Malthouse Theatre, Melbourne, as part of the Helium Festival. In 2014, for Sydney Theatre Company he directed productions of Macbeth starring Hugo Weaving and Maxim Gorky's Children of the Sun adapted by Andrew Upton.

In 2015, Williams directed a radical staging of Tennessee Williams's Suddenly Last Summer, using a blend of live video and stage action. The production earned him a Best Director nomination at the Sydney Theatre Awards, and won him the Helpmann Award for Best Direction of a Play. He also directed the Australian premiere of Caryl Churchill's Love and Information for Malthouse Theatre, Melbourne, and the Sydney Theatre Company. The production garnered Williams a second nomination for the Helpmann Award for Best Direction of a Play, as well as Best Director nominations from the Sydney Theatre Awards, and Melbourne's Green Room Awards.

In 2016, for STC Williams directed a revival of the Australian classic The Golden Age by Louis Nowra, Shakespeare's A Midsummer Night's Dream, and Arthur Miller's All My Sons, for which he was nominated for Best Director at the Sydney Theatre Awards. He also adapted and directed a production of Miss Julie for the Melbourne Theatre Company. It was his second time combining live video and stage action. The production was nominated for eight Green Room Awards, winning Best Production, Best Digital Media Design and Integration, and Best Director for Williams.

In 2017, Williams directed the Australian premiere of Lucy Kirkwood's Chimerica for Sydney Theatre Company. The production featured an ensemble cast of 32, including a chorus of students from NIDA, with set design by David Fleischer. Hailed "a triumph" by The Australian, Chimerica was nominated for two Helpmann Awards; Jason Chong for Best Actor, and Williams for Best Direction of a Play. This was followed by a staging of Caryl Churchill's Cloud 9, Williams' second professional production of a Churchill play. The production was nominated for nine Sydney Theatre Awards, including Best Production and Best Director for Williams. It was also nominated for two Helpmann Awards, Best Director for Williams, and Best Supporting Actor for Harry Greenwood. Later in 2017 he directed an adaptation by Andrew Upton of Chekhov's Three Sisters for the STC.

In 2018, Williams directed Bertolt Brecht's The Resistible Rise of Arturo Ui, starring Hugo Weaving in the titular role. The production was nominated for six Helpmann Awards, including Best Production, Best Director for Williams, and winning Best Supporting Actress and Best Actor for Anita Hegh and Weaving respectively. Later, it was nominated for a further nine Sydney Theatre Awards, again for Best Production and Best Director for Williams, and winning four awards including Best Actor for Weaving, Best Stage Design for Robert Cousins, and Best Supporting Actor for Mitchell Butel. Next Williams directed a 7-hour stage adaptation of The Harp in the South: Part One & Part Two by Kate Mulvany. The highly acclaimed production brought to life Ruth Park's celebrated trilogy of novels, Missus, The Harp in the South, and Poor Man's Orange, using an ensemble of 18 actors to perform the marathon work across two nights of theatre. The production was nominated for 11 Sydney Theatre Awards, winning Best Production, Best New Australian Work for Mulvany, and Best Direction for Williams. It was nominated for a further six Helpmann Awards, including Best Production of a Play, Best New Australian Work, and Best Director for Williams. Williams finished 2018 with an operatic take on Patrick White's classic play A Cheery Soul, featuring his signature use of live video. Staged at the Sydney Opera House, the production starred Sarah Peirse, with an ensemble including Anita Hegh, Shari Sebbens, and Tara Morice.

2019 saw Williams take on Tennessee Williams' masterpiece Cat on a Hot Tin Roof , in a contemporary adaptation featuring Zahra Newman, Harry Greenwood, Pamela Rabe, and Hugo Weaving as Big Daddy. The production marked Weaving and Williams' third time collaborating. This was followed by a gender blind staging of William Golding's Lord of the Flies. Starring Mia Wasikowska as Ralph, the production featured an ensemble including Joseph Althouse, Justin Amankwa, Nyx Calder, Yerin Ha, Daniel Monks, Mark Paguio, Rahel Romahn, Eliza Scanlen, Contessa Treffone, and Nikita Waldron.

In 2020 Williams wrote and directed an adaptation of Oscar Wilde's novel The Picture of Dorian Gray. The one-person show saw actor Eryn Jean Norvill play 26 characters in a two-hour performance at the Roslyn Packer Theatre that incorporated Williams' signature use of live video. Hailed a "tour de force" by The Guardian, the show received a slew five star reviews and was extended twice. The production was reprised in 2022, first touring to the Adelaide Festival, then playing a sold out return season in Sydney, followed by a sold out ten week season in Melbourne at the Arts Centre Melbourne, opening in Rising Festival and presented by Michael Cassel Group. The production received further five star reviews in Melbourne and Adelaide, including from The Age, which called the production a "dazzling masterpiece", and Time Out, which declared it a "reinvention of theatre". The production was nominated for six Sydney Theatre Awards, winning Best Production, Best Director for Williams, Best Performer for Norvill, and Best Stage Design for Designer Marg Horwell. The production's Melbourne season was nominated for six Green Room Awards, winning Best Production, Best Director for Williams, Best Performer for Norvill, and Best Costume Design for Horwell.

In 2021 Williams reunited with playwright Kate Mulvany to direct her adaptation of Ruth Park's cult classic Playing Beatie Bow. The production starred Catherine Văn-Davies and Sophia Nolan, with Heather Mitchell and Guy Simon in supporting roles, and was the reopening work of the Sydney Theatre Company's newly renovated Wharf Theatres. The production was nominated for two Sydney Theatre Awards, Best Production for Young People and Best Supporting Actor for Mitchell. Following Sydney's second lockdown, Williams reopened STC's theatres with an innovative production of William Shakespeare's Julius Caesar. Adapted by Williams, the production was performed at The Wharf Theatre in-the-round by just three actors, Zahra Newman as Brutus, Ewen Leslie as Cassius and Caesar, and Geraldine Hakewill as Mark Antony, using live video filmed by the performers on mobile phones and displayed on a giant flying cube of LED screens. Time Out magazine praised the work as bringing "Shakespeare's revered classic right up to the very minute", while The Guardian declared Williams a "technological innovator in theatre".

In addition to the national tour of Dorian Gray, 2022 saw Williams write and direct an acclaimed adaptation of Robert Louis Stevenson's Strange Case of Dr Jekyll and Mr Hyde. The production, starring Ewen Leslie and Matthew Backer, was the second part of Williams' trilogy of Victorian Gothic adaptations, further expanding his signature interweaving of live performance, live video, and prerecord video. The work received a rare five star review from the Sydney Morning Herald, which praised the work's "mind-boggling virtuosity". The production was nominated for six Sydney Theatre Awards, including Best Production and Best Original Score, and winning three awards including Best Director for Williams. Williams also directed and adapted a new production of Shakespeare's The Tempest starring Richard Roxburgh as Prospero. The production, featuring an ensemble including Guy Simon, Mandy McElhinney, Shiv Palekar, Claude Scott-Mitchell, Megan Wilding, and Susie Youssef, was designed by Jake Nash and was praised by The Guardian for its "outstanding" performances and "revolutionary approach" to the script, which interpolated texts from other Shakespeare works including Richard II, Pericles, The Merchant of Venice, and Hamlet in order to amplify the voices of Caliban and Miranda. The production was nominated for six Sydney Theatre Awards, winning Best Supporting Actor for Peter Carrol's performance of Ariel.

At the start of 2023, Williams revived his adaptations of The Picture of Dorian Gray and Strange Case of Dr Jekyll and Mr Hyde. Dorian Gray played a third sold out season in Sydney, before touring to Auckland Arts Festival, playing the Tiri Te Kanawa Theatre. Jekyll & Hyde played to five star reviews and standing ovations at His Majesty's Theatre as part of the Perth Festival. It then played Her Majesty's Theatre at the Adelaide Festival, becoming the highest grossing show in the festival's 60-year history. Williams then directed Tommy Murphy's stage adaptation of Nevil Shute's novel On the Beach, with an ensemble cast featuring Tai Hara, Michelle Lim Davidson, and Ben O'Toole. In five star reviews, Time Out called the production "achingly beautiful", while Artshub described the staging as "the work of genius".

In February 2024, the London season of The Picture of Dorian Gray, starring Sarah Snook, premiered at the Theatre Royal Haymarket to wide critical acclaim. In a five star review The Guardian declared the production to be “unmissable”, while also giving five stars The Telegraph described Williams’ production as “a gamechanging piece of theatre”. The Sunday Times also gave five stars, calling Williams’ modern adaptation “thrillingly relevant”, while The New York Times declared the production "a triumph". The Washington Post heralded Williams’ innovative use of video as "theatre’s future", and The Stage wrote “I’m unsure if I will ever see a more perfectly executed use of digital visual art forms on stage. The Picture of Dorian Gray represents the pinnacle of what can be achieved with technology in theatre”. The production sold out its season and went on to win two 2024 Olivier Awards, Sarah Snook for Best Actress in a Play and Marg Horwell for Best Costumes, while Williams was nominated for The Stage Debut Awards for Best Creative West End Debut for his direction. The production was named on many of London's Best Theatre of 2024 lists, including The Stage, The Mirror, Time Out, The I, London Theatre, The Queer Review, and The Guardian, which listed the show as the No. 2 production across the UK for 2024. Later in 2024, Williams staged Dracula as the third instalment in his "gothic trilogy" and his final production as artistic director of the Sydney Theatre Company. The play, starring Zahra Newman in 23 roles, ran from July 2 to August 4. Williams will direct a West End production of the play at the Noël Coward Theatre in 2026, with Cynthia Erivo set to star.

In 2025, Williams transferred The Picture of Dorian Gray to Broadway, where it played a sold out 14 week season and broke multiple box office records at the 104-year-old Music Box Theatre, including repeatedly breaking the record for the highest grossing week in the venue's history of any play. The production was met with huge critical and popular acclaim, with The New Yorker declaring “if you can see only one show this season, make it this perception-altering adaptation, directed by Kip Williams, an Australian megatalent exploring the cutting edge of video onstage”. The production received 6 nominations for the 2025 Tony Awards, the most ever for a one-person play in Tony's history, as well as 5 Drama Desk nominations, and 3 Drama League nominations, with Williams nominated for Best Director across all three ceremonies, as well receiving nominations for Best Production at the Drama League Awards and winning Best Unique Theatrical Experience at the Drama Desk Awards. The Picture of Dorian Gray was honoured with two wins at the 78th Tony Awards, Snook for Best Actress and Horwell for Best Costume, and three Drama Desk Awards.

=== Opera ===
Williams has directed opera for Opera Australia, Victorian Opera, Sydney Chamber Opera, Dark Mofo Festival, Tasmanian Symphony Orchestra, Australian String Quartet, Ensemble Offspring, and Carriageworks. Williams has collaborated extensively with Sydney Chamber Opera Artistic Director Jack Symonds since 2011, including productions of Peter Maxwell Davies's The Lighthouse, Fausto Romitelli's An Index of Metals, and stagings of J. S. Bach's cantata Ich habe genug and Symonds' original work Nunc dimittis.

Williams staged a song cycle for SCO and the 18th Biennale of Sydney titled Through the Gates, consisting of works from Shostakovich to Bach.

In 2017 he co-directed with Elizabeth Gadsby a gender bending reinterpretation of Benjamin Britten's chamber opera The Rape of Lucretia. The production involved singers lip synching and performing multiple characters in a radical reframing of Britten's original piece. The production was a co-production between Victorian Opera, SCO, and Dark Mofo, and premiered in Sydney at Carriageworks. It was revived in June 2018 for Dark Mofo and played at the Theatre Royal, Hobart. In 2024 he directed the world premiere of Jack Symond's Gilgamesh, the first English language operatic adaptation of the Epic of Gilgamesh. The production received the Art Music Awards for Performance of the Year and Work of the Year: Dramatic.

Williams was set to direct Handel's Hercules for English National Opera in the autumn of 2020, but the production was unable to proceed due to the Coronavirus pandemic. Williams will return to ENO to direct the European premiere of Angel's Bone by Du Yun and Royce Vavrek in May 2026, in collaboration with Factory International and BBC Philharmonic.

== Works ==
=== Theatre ===
Year	Title	Role	Company	Theatre
2026	The Maids	Writer and Director	St. Ann’s Warehouse, Donmar Warehouse	St. Ann’s Warehouse
2026	Dracula	Writer and Director	Michael Cassel Group, Kindred Partners, Sydney Theatre Company	Noël Coward Theatre
2025	The Maids	Writer and Director	Donmar Warehouse	Donmar Warehouse
2025	The Picture of Dorian Gray	Writer and Director	Michael Cassel Group, Kindred Parters, Sydney Theatre Company	Music Box Theatre, Broadway
2024	Dracula	Writer and Director	Sydney Theatre Company	Roslyn Packer Theatre
2024	The Picture of Dorian Gray	Writer and Director	Michael Cassel Group, Kindred Parters, Sydney Theatre Company	Theatre Royal Haymarket, West End
2023	On the Beach	Director	Sydney Theatre Company	Roslyn Packer Theatre
2023	Strange Case of Dr Jekyll and Mr Hyde	Writer and Director	Adelaide Festival, Perth Festival, Sydney Theatre Company	Her Majesty's Theatre, Adelaide, His Majesty's Theatre, Perth
2023	The Picture of Dorian Gray	Writer and Director	Auckland Arts Festival, Sydney Theatre Company	Dame Kiri Te Kanawa Theatre, Aotea Centre, Roslyn Packer Theatre
2022	The Tempest	Adaptor and Director	Sydney Theatre Company	Roslyn Packer Theatre
2022	Strange Case of Dr Jekyll and Mr Hyde	Writer and Director	Sydney Theatre Company	Roslyn Packer Theatre
2022	The Picture of Dorian Gray	Writer and Director	Adelaide Festival, Rising (festival), Michael Cassel Group, Sydney Theatre Company	Her Majesty's Theatre, Adelaide, Playhouse, Arts Centre Melbourne, Roslyn Packer Theatre
2021	Julius Caesar	Adaptor and Director	Sydney Theatre Company	Wharf 1 Theatre
2021	Playing Beatie Bow	Director	Sydney Theatre Company	Wharf 3 Theatre
2020-21	The Picture of Dorian Gray	Writer and Director	Sydney Theatre Company	Roslyn Packer Theatre
2019	Lord of the Flies	Director	Sydney Theatre Company	Roslyn Packer Theatre
2019	Cat on a Hot Tin Roof	Director	Sydney Theatre Company	Roslyn Packer Theatre
2018	A Cheery Soul	Director	Sydney Theatre Company	Drama Theatre, Sydney Opera House
2018	The Harp in the South: Part 1 & Part 2	Director	Sydney Theatre Company	Roslyn Packer Theatre
2018	The Resistible Rise of Arturo Ui	Director	Sydney Theatre Company	Roslyn Packer Theatre
2017	Three Sisters	Director	Sydney Theatre Company	Drama Theatre, Sydney Opera House
2017	Cloud 9	Director	Sydney Theatre Company	Wharf 1 Theatre
2017	Chimerica	Director	Sydney Theatre Company	Roslyn Packer Theatre
2016	A Midsummer Night's Dream	Adaptor and Director	Sydney Theatre Company	Drama Theatre, Sydney Opera House
2016	All My Sons	Director	Sydney Theatre Company	Roslyn Packer Theatre
2016	Miss Julie	Writer and Director	Melbourne Theatre Company	Sumner Theatre
2016	The Golden Age	Director	Sydney Theatre Company	Wharf 1 Theatre
2015	Love and Information	Director	Malthouse Theatre, Sydney Theatre Company	Merlyn Theatre, Wharf 1 Theatre
2015	Suddenly Last Summer	Director	Sydney Theatre Company	Drama Theatre, Sydney Opera House
2014	Children of the Sun	Director	Sydney Theatre Company	Drama Theatre, Sydney Opera House
2014	Macbeth	Adaptor and Director	Sydney Theatre Company	Roslyn Packer Theatre
2013	Romeo and Juliet	Adaptor and Director	Sydney Theatre Company	Drama Theatre, Sydney Opera House
2013	Lord of the Flies	Director	Malthouse Theatre, Helium Festival, US-A-UM	The Tower Theatre
2013	Cloud 9	Director	National Institute of Dramatic Art	Parade Theatre
2012	Fallout	Director and Dramaturg	US-A-UM, Tamarama Rock Surfers	Old Fitz Theatre
2012	Under Milk Wood	Director	Sydney Theatre Company	Drama Theatre, Sydney Opera House
2010	Lord of the Flies	Director	NIDA	The Space
2009	Not I	Adaptor and Director	NIDA	The Studio

=== Opera ===
Year	Title	Role	Company	Theatre
2026	Angel's Bone	Director	English National Opera, Factory International, BBC Philharmonic	Aviva Studios, London Coliseum
2024	Gilgamesh	Director	Opera Australia, Sydney Chamber Opera, Australian String Quartet, Ensemble Offspring, Carriageworks	Carriageworks Bay 17
2018	Lucretia	Director	Victorian Opera, Dark Mofo Festival, Sydney Chamber Opera, Tasmanian Symphony Orchestra, Theatre Royal, Hobart	Theatre Royal, Hobart
2017	Lucretia	Director	Victorian Opera, Sydney Chamber Opera, Carriageworks	Carriageworks Bay 20
2015	An Index of Metals	Director	Sydney Chamber Opera, Carriageworks, Ensemble Offspring	Carriageworks Bay 20
2012	The Lighthouse	Director	Sydney Chamber Opera, Carriageworks	Carriageworks Bay 20
2012	Through the Gates	Director	Sydney Chamber Opera, Biennale of Sydney	Pier 2/3
2011	Ich Habe Genug + Nunc Dimittis	Director	Sydney Chamber Opera	Playhouse

== Awards and nominations ==
Award	Category	Year	Nominee	Result
Tony Awards	Best Direction of a Play	2025	The Picture of Dorian Gray	Nominated
Drama Desk Awards	Drama Desk Award for Outstanding Director of a Play	2025	The Picture of Dorian Gray	Nominated
Drama Desk Awards	Drama Desk Award for Unique Theatrical Experience	2025	The Picture of Dorian Gray	Won
Drama League Award	Drama League Award Outstanding Direction of a Play	2025	The Picture of Dorian Gray	Nominated
Drama League Award	Drama League Award Outstanding Production of a Play	2025	The Picture of Dorian Gray	Nominated
The Stage Debut Awards	Best Creative West End Debut - Direction	2024	The Picture of Dorian Gray	Nominated
Helpmann Awards	Best Direction of a Play	2015	Suddenly Last Summer	Won
Helpmann Awards	Helpmann Award for Best Play	2015	Suddenly Last Summer	Nominated
Helpmann Awards	Best Direction of a Play	2016	Love and Information	Nominated
Helpmann Awards	Best Direction of a Play	2017	Chimerica	Nominated
Helpmann Awards	Best Direction of a Play	2018	Cloud 9	Nominated
Helpmann Awards	Best Direction of a Play	2018	The Resistible Rise of Arturo Ui	Nominated
Helpmann Awards	Helpmann Award for Best Play	2018	The Resistible Rise of Arturo Ui	Nominated
Helpmann Awards	Best Direction of a Play	2019	The Harp in the South	Nominated
Helpmann Awards	Helpmann Award for Best Play	2019	The Harp in the South	Nominated
Green Room Awards	Best Director	2015	Love and Information	Nominated
Green Room Awards	Best Director	2016	Miss Julie	Won
Green Room Awards	Best Production	2016	Miss Julie	Won
Green Room Awards	Best Digital Design and Integration	2016	Miss Julie	Won
Green Room Awards	Best Director	2023	The Picture of Dorian Gray	Won
Green Room Awards	Best Production	2023	The Picture of Dorian Gray	Won
Sydney Theatre Awards	Best Direction of a Mainstage Production	2015	Suddenly Last Summer	Nominated
Sydney Theatre Awards	Best Mainstage Production	2015	Suddenly Last Summer	Nominated
Sydney Theatre Awards	Best Direction of a Mainstage Production	2015	Love and Information	Nominated
Sydney Theatre Awards	Best Direction of a Mainstage Production	2016	All My Sons	Nominated
Sydney Theatre Awards	Best Mainstage Production	2016	All My Sons	Nominated
Sydney Theatre Awards	Best Direction of a Mainstage Production	2017	Cloud 9	Nominated
Sydney Theatre Awards	Best Mainstage Production	2017	Cloud 9	Nominated
Sydney Theatre Awards	Best Direction of a Mainstage Production	2018	The Harp in the South	Won
Sydney Theatre Awards	Best Mainstage Production	2018	The Harp in the South	Won
Sydney Theatre Awards	Best Direction of a Mainstage Production	2018	The Resistible Rise of Arturo Ui	Nominated
Sydney Theatre Awards	Best Mainstage Production	2018	The Resistible Rise of Arturo Ui	Nominated
Sydney Theatre Awards	Best Direction of a Mainstage Production	2021	The Picture of Dorian Gray	Won
Sydney Theatre Awards	Best Mainstage Production	2021	The Picture of Dorian Gray	Won
Sydney Theatre Awards	Best Production For Young People	2021	Playing Beatie Bow	Nominated
Sydney Theatre Awards	Best Direction of a Mainstage Production	2022	Strange Case of Dr Jekyll and Mr Hyde	Won
Sydney Theatre Awards	Best Mainstage Production	2022	Strange Case of Dr Jekyll and Mr Hyde	Nominated
Dorian Awards	Best Play	2025	The Picture of Dorian Gray	Nominated

== See also ==
- List of English speaking theatre directors in the 20th and 21st centuries
