= Es Devlin =

British stage designer (born 1971)

Es Devlin CBE RDI
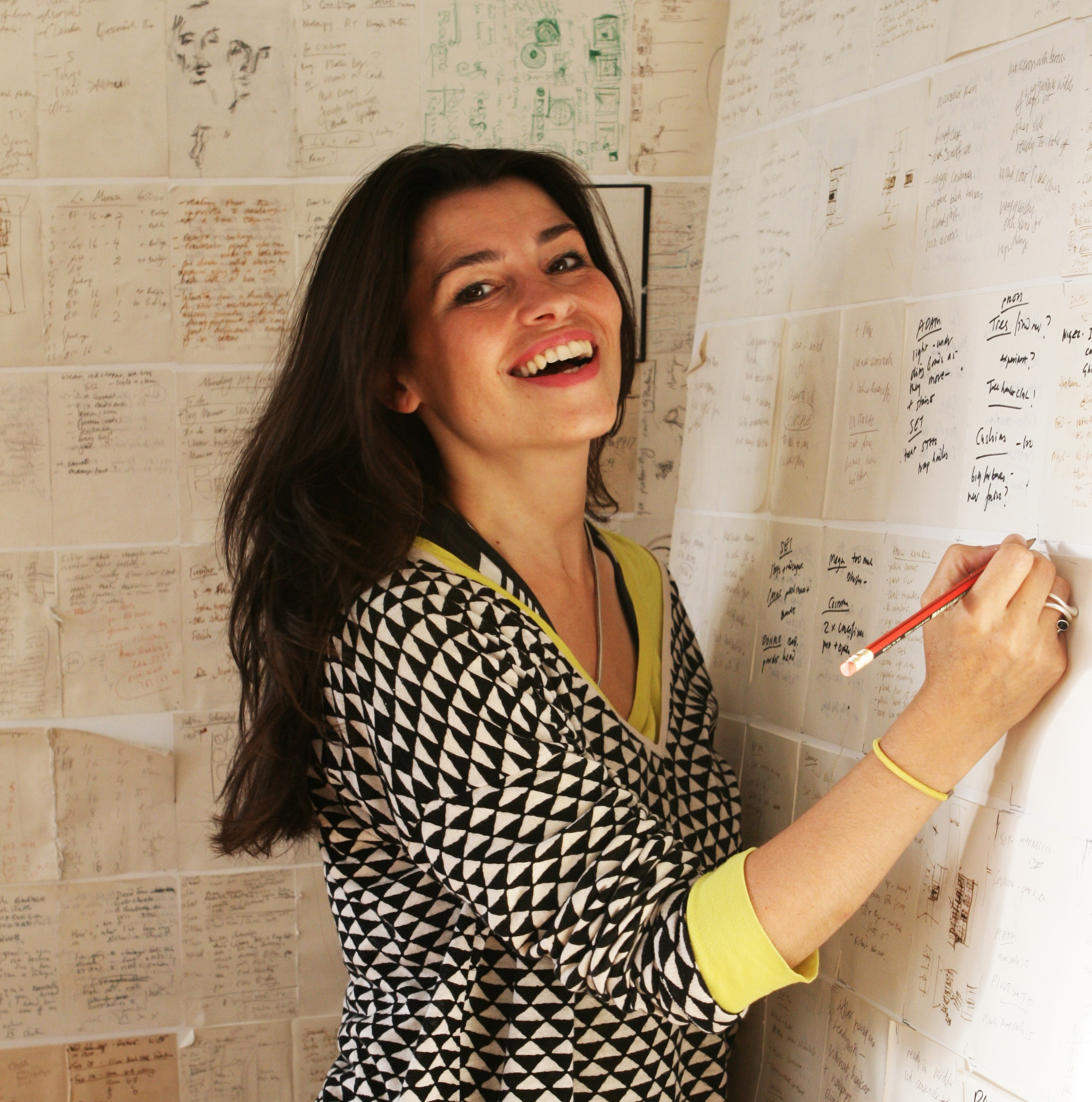
- Devlin in 2016
- Born: Esmeralda Devlin; 24 September 1971 (age 55); Kingston upon Thames, London, England
- Education: Central Saint Martins; Bristol University (BA); Motley Theatre Design Course
- Occupations: Artist and designer
- Spouse: Jack Galloway
- Children: 2
- Awards: 3 Olivier Awards; 1 Tony Award; Royal Designer for Industry
- Website: esdevlin.com

Esmeralda Devlin CBE RDI (/ɛz/; born 24 September 1971) is an English artist and stage designer who works in a range of media, often mapping light and projecting film onto kinetic sculptural forms. She has received several accolades including a Tony Award and two Olivier Awards. She was appointed Officer of the Order of the British Empire (OBE) in the 2015 New Year Honours and Commander of the Order of the British Empire (CBE) in the 2022 New Year Honours by Queen Elizabeth II for services to design. She was recognized as one of the BBC's 100 women of 2013.

Devlin is known for her extensive work in the theatre. For her work in the West End she won two Laurence Olivier Awards for Best Set Design for Chimerica (2014), and The Nether (2015). She was Olivier-nominated for Hamlet (2016), The Lehman Trilogy (2019), and Dear England (2024). For her work on Broadway she won the Tony Award for Best Scenic Design of a Play for The Lehman Trilogy (2022). She was Tony-nominated for Machinal (2014), and American Psycho (2016). She is also known for her The Hunt (2019) and The Motive and the Cue (2023).

== Early life and education ==
Devlin was born in Kingston upon Thames, London, on 24 September 1971. She attended Cranbrook School, Kent.

She studied English literature at Bristol University, followed by a Foundation Course in Fine Art at Central St. Martin's eventually specialising in theatre design. While undertaking her studies, she prepared the props for Le Cirque Invisible, the circus company founded by Victoria Chaplin and Chaplin's husband, Jean-Baptiste Thierrée.

== Career ==
Es Devlin's career began in narrative theatre and experimental opera, with early work at London's Bush Theatre. In 1998, she made her National Theatre debut when Trevor Nunn invited her to design the set for Harold Pinter's Betrayal. Since then, Devlin has gained a reputation for her sculptural and innovative designs for the stage.

In 2003, she ventured into concert design with her first collaboration, working with the band Wire. In 2005, Kanye West hired her to design his Touch the Sky tour, marking the start of a long-term collaboration, which continued with his Glow in the Dark, Watch the Throne, and Yeezus tours.

In 2012, Devlin designed the scenic elements for the closing ceremony of the London Olympics. Four years later, in 2016, she created the set design for the opening ceremony of the Rio Olympics.

Her work on installations also began gaining attention, with her 2016 installation Mirrormaze in Peckham drawing large crowds. In 2017, she designed the Singing Tree at the Victoria and Albert Museum, an interactive machine-learning-based installation, viewed by over 10,000 visitors during Christmas. That same year, she created Room2022, a 7,000 square-foot installation at Art Basel Miami.

In 2018, Devlin's Fifth Lion installation in Trafalgar Square, which roared AI-generated poetry to crowds, was a highlight of the London Design Festival. Also in 2018, she collaborated with theoretical physicist Carlo Rovelli on a performance of The Order of Time, narrated by Benedict Cumberbatch at BOLD Tendencies in Peckham. Later that year, she designed MASK, a projection-mapped model city displayed at Somerset House.

In 2019, Devlin delivered a talk at the TED Conference in Vancouver titled Mind-blowing sculptures that fuse art & technology, which was selected by TED curator Chris Anderson as one of the best talks of the year. She also worked on The Hunt, a play directed by Rupert Goold, which premiered in London and transferred to St. Ann's Warehouse in New York in 2024.

Devlin's career took on international projects, including designing the UK Pavilion at the 2020 World Expo in Dubai, making her the first woman to receive such a commission since the inception of world expositions in 1851.

In 2021, her collaboration with rapper Dave and producer Fraser T. Smith won the Ivor Novello Award for Best Contemporary Song. She also co-designed the Brit Awards statuettes with artist Yinka Ilori.

In 2022, Devlin's work on the Super Bowl Halftime Show, featuring Dr. Dre, Kendrick Lamar, and Eminem, earned her three Emmy Awards, including one for Best Production Design. That same year, her scenic design for Adele's performance at Griffith Observatory won five additional Emmy Awards. Her scenic design for The Lehman Trilogy, directed by Sam Mendes, won her the Tony Award for Best Scenic Design.

Throughout her career, Devlin has collaborated on large-scale stage designs for artists including Kanye West, Beyoncé, Adele, U2, The Weeknd, Lorde, and Pet Shop Boys and worked with institutions such as the Royal Opera House in London.

== Style ==
The Poem Pavilion she designed at the 2020 World Expo in Dubai — following the UK's theme "Innovating for a Shared Future" — featured an illuminated "message to space" to which each of the Expo's million visitors would be invited to contribute.

Using plastic trees, sellotape, stretchy mirrored sheeting, string, she builds "dream-like constellation of things" explaining that “the piece happens between those objects.”

"Each of her designs is an attack on the notion that a set is merely scenery" wrote Andrew O'Hagan in The New Yorker in 2016. Devlin "is in demand because she can enter the psychic ether of each production and make it glow with significance." For Hamlet director Lyndsey Turner, Devlin “doesn't design what a play wants but what it needs.”

== Recognition ==
- 2006: Olivier Awards for Best Costume Design for The Dog in the Manger
- 2014–2015: Olivier Awards for Best Set Design for Chimerica (2014) and The Nether (2015)
- 2015: Officer of the Order of the British Empire (OBE)
- 2018: Royal Designer for Industry for Theatre Design
- 2022: Commander of the Order of the British Empire (CBE) for services to design
- Fellow of University of the Arts London

Devlin is the subject of episode three of the Netflix documentary series Abstract: The Art of Design.

== Work ==
=== Theatre ===
Year	Project	Credit	Venue	Ref.
1999	Howie the Rookie	Scenic Design	Bush Theatre, London	
2001	A Day in the Death of Joe Egg	Scenic Design / Costume Design	Ambassador's Theatre, West End	
2003	A Day in the Death of Joe Egg	Scenic Design / Costume Design	American Airlines Theatre, Broadway	
2013	Chimerica	Scenic Designer	Almeida Theatre, West End	
2014	Machinal	Set Design	American Airlines Theatre, Broadway	
2014	The Nether	Scenic Designer	Royal Court Theatre, London	
2014	American Psycho	Scenic Design	Almeida Theatre, West End	
2016	American Psycho	Scenic Design	Gerald Schoenfeld Theatre, Broadway	
2015	Hamlet	Scenic Designer	Barbican Theatre, West End	
2018	Aristocrats	Scenic Designer	Donmar Warehouse, West End	
2018	Girls & Boys	Set Designer	The Royal Court Theatre, London	
2018	Girls & Boys	Set Designer	Minetta Lane Theatre, Off-Broadway	
2018	The Lehman Trilogy	Scenic Design	Lyttelton Theatre, West End	
2021	The Lehman Trilogy	Scenic Design	Nederlander Theatre, Broadway	
2019	The Hunt	Scenic Design	Almeida Theatre, West End	
2024	The Hunt	Scenic Design	St. Ann's Warehouse, Brooklyn	
2023	The Crucible	Scenic Designer	Olivier Theatre, West End	
2023	Dear England	Scenic Designer	Olivier Theatre, West End	
2023	The Motive and the Cue	Scenic Designer	Lyttelton Theatre, West End	
2024	The Motive and the Cue	Scenic Designer	Noël Coward Theatre, West End	
2024	Coriolanus	Scenic Designer	Olivier Theatre	

=== Television ===
Year	Project	Credit	Notes
2008	Salome	Production designer	Television movie
2014	Julie Taymor's A Midsummer Night's Dream	Production designer	Television movie
2015	Hamlet	Production designer	Television movie
2015	Adele Live in London	Production designer	Television special
2015	Adele Live in New York City	Production designer	Television special
2018	The 60th Annual Grammy Awards	Creative director	Television special
2021	Adele One Night Only	Production designer	Television special
2022	The Pepsi Super Bowl LVI Halftime Show	Creative director	Television special
2023	The Weekend Live at SoFi Stadium	Production designer	Television special
2023	The Crucible	Set Decorator	National Theatre Live special

=== Concert ===
Year	Project	Artist
2003	Flag: Burning	Wire
2005	Touch the Sky	Kanye West
2007–2008	Glow in the Dark Tour	Kanye West
2009	VH1 STORYTELLERS	Kanye West
2009–2010	Monster Ball US Theatre Tour	Lady Gaga
2009–2010	The Resistance Tour	Muse
2010	Madrid	MTV Europe Music Awards
2011	World Arena Tour	Batman Live
2011	Watch The Throne Arena Tour	Kanye West & Jay-Z
2011	Progress Live	Take That
2011	Revel Theatre	Kanye West
2013	Hyde Park	Rolling Stones
2013	Electric Tour	Pet Shop Boys
2013	Yeezus	Kanye West
2014	Bangerz World Arena Tour	Miley Cyrus
2015	Innocence & Experience World Tour	U2
2015	Live in New York	Adele
2016	Jimmy Fallon	The Weeknd
2016	World Arena Tour	Adele
2016	AMAS	The Weeknd
2016	Formation World Stadium Tour	Beyoncé
2017	Legend of the Fall Tour	The Weeknd
2017	GLASTONBURY	Lorde
2018	Brit Awards	Stormzy
2018	Experience + Innocence Tour	U2
2018	Coachella	The Weeknd
2019	Pretty Crazy Concert	Joey Yung
2021	ONE NIGHT ONLY	Adele
2022	Super Bowl Halftime Show	DR DRE with Kendrick Lamar, Eminem, Mary J Blige, Snoop Dogg, 50 Cent
2022	After Hours til Dawn	The Weeknd
2023	After Hours til Dawn	The Weeknd
2023	Renaissance – World Tour	Beyoncé
2023	The Sphere	U2

=== Fashion ===
Year	Collaboration	Season	Notes
2015	Louis Vuitton	SS	
2015	Louis Vuitton	Series 2	
2015	Louis Vuitton	AW	
2016	Louis Vuitton	SS	
2016	Louis Vuitton	Series 3	
2016	Louis Vuitton	AW	
2016	Louis Vuitton	Cruise	
2020	Louis Vuitton	AW	
2021	Chanel	Celebration	
2022	Dior	SS	Men
2023	YSL	SS	Men

=== Publication ===
Year	Name	Publisher	Notes
2023	An Atlas of Es Devlin	Thames & Hudson	updated 2026

=== Exhibition ===
Year	Name	Location	Notes
2023	An Atlas of Es Devlin	Cooper Hewitt Museum	
2026	Es Devlin: Other Worlds	Design Museum, London	

== Accolades ==
Year	Award	Category	Nominated work	Result	Ref.
2014	Laurence Olivier Award	Best Set Design	Chimerica	Won	
2015	Laurence Olivier Award	Best Set Design	The Nether	Won	
2016	Laurence Olivier Award	Best Set Design	Hamlet	Nominated	
2019	Laurence Olivier Award	Best Set Design	The Lehman Trilogy	Nominated	
2024	Laurence Olivier Award	Best Set Design	Dear England	Nominated	
2014	Tony Award	Best Scenic Design of a Play	Machinal	Nominated	
2016	Tony Award	Best Scenic Design of a Musical	American Psycho	Nominated	
2022	Tony Award	Best Scenic Design of a Play	The Lehman Trilogy	Won	

== Personal life ==
Devlin is married to the theatrical costume designer Jack Galloway; they have two children and live in London. Her husband works on The Lion King Musical franchise.
