= The Female of the Species (play) =

Play written by Joanna Murray-Smith

- Original language: English
- Written by: Joanna Murray-Smith
- Characters: Margot Mason; Molly Rivers; Tess Thornton; Bryan Thornton; Frank; Theo Reynolds
- Subject
- Genre: Comedy
- Setting: The Present

Premiere
- Date: 30 August 2006
- Place: Melbourne, Australia
- Official website

The Female of the Species is a comic play by Joanna Murray-Smith first performed in 2006. The play is a satire about celebrity feminists, with a plot loosely inspired by a real-life incident in 2000, when author Germaine Greer was held at gunpoint in her own home by a disturbed student.

The play was premiered in Australia, where it had several productions in 2006 and 2008. A London production opened in the West End in 2008.

== Productions ==
The Female of the Species was premiered in Australia, produced by the Melbourne Theatre Company in 2006. It was also produced by the Queensland Theatre Company at the Cremorne Theatre in South Brisbane in February and March 2008. It was then produced by the Black Swan Theatre Company at the Playhouse Theatre in Perth in June and July 2008, and toured in Western Australia in August 2008. The production was directed by Patrick Nolan with music by the composer David Chesworth.

The play had its London West End premiere in previews at the Vaudeville Theatre on 10 July 2008, with the official opening on 16 July 2008. It ran until 4 October 2008. The production was directed by Roger Michell and the cast included Dame Eileen Atkins, Anna Maxwell Martin, Sophie Thompson, Paul Chahidi, Con O'Neill and Sam Kelly.

A Broadway production, originally scheduled for 2008 with Annette Bening, was postponed until the showings scheduled for 24–29 June 2013 at the Lace Market Theatre

== Synopsis ==
Margot Mason is a feminist writer suffering from writer's block; she can not meet the deadlines for her next book. Molly Rivers, a deranged former student of Margot's, arrives unexpectedly at her country home with a gun and handcuffs Mason to her desk. Molly blames Margot for warping her mother's mind with her hit book The Cerebral Vagina. Following Margot's advice, Molly's mother gave Molly away as a baby so that she wouldn't be enslaved by motherhood and then killed herself. Molly has had herself sterilized to preserve her creativity, only to be told by Margot that she has no talent.

Margot's daughter Tess arrives, exhausted from her house full of children. Margot has accused Tess of throwing her life away to embrace the role of housewife. Tess agrees that her mother should be shot. Tess's sensitive stockbroker husband, Bryan also arrives to debate the virtues of Margot's best-sellers, her inconsistent philosophy, and her inability to "mother". Even a macho taxi driver (Frank) and Margot's flamboyantly gay publisher (Theo) comment on her feminist failings.

== Characters and London cast ==
- Margot Mason - Eileen Atkins
- Molly Rivers - Anna Maxwell Martin
- Tess Thornton - Sophie Thompson
- Bryan Thornton - Paul Chahidi
- Frank - Con O'Neill
- Theo Reynolds - Sam Kelly

== Critical reception ==
Reviews of the West End production were mostly positive. The Independent wrote that "the emphasis is on the jokes, of which there are many.... All the actors in Michell's production are excellent.... The show is stolen by Sophie Thompson, as the daughter whose only means of opposing Margot is to be the perfect mother and housewife... the unconvincing ending is neat without being tidy...." This Is London gave unqualified praise: "...the splendid Dame Eileen mounts another witty display of brisk imperiousness and self-admiring froideur, effortlessly swatting away complaints as if they were mere gnats. It makes for an evening of wicked, educated and reactionary amusement."

On the other hand, The Sunday Times commented that the play was only "fitfully amusing". Likewise, Variety complained, "laugh-strewn though many of [the speeches] are, they don't build tension because the plot lacks consistency... this plot has more holes than a tennis net. Murray-Smith seems to put ideas and gags way ahead of consistent characterization and motive."
