= The Children (play) =

2016 play by Lucy Kirkwood

- Original language: English
- Written by: Lucy Kirkwood
- Setting: British coast

Premiere
- Date: 17 November 2016
- Place: Royal Court Theatre

The Children is a play written by Lucy Kirkwood which premiered in London in 2016 and then on Broadway in 2017.

== Premise ==
The play concerns two retired nuclear physicists, the married couple Hazel and Robin, who live in a remote cottage on the British coast. The world outside is dealing with a major disaster at a nuclear power station. They are visited by Rose, who is also a nuclear physicist.

The event that served as the inspiration for the play was the 2011 Fukushima nuclear explosion in Japan.

== Productions ==
The play premiered in London at the Royal Court Theatre, running from 17 November 2016 through 14 January 2017. The cast featured Francesca Annis, Deborah Findlay, and Ron Cook, directed by James Macdonald.

The play premiered on Broadway, produced by the Manhattan Theatre Club with the same cast, running at the Samuel J. Friedman Theatre from 28 November 2017 to 4 February 2018. Direction was again by James Macdonald. The play received two nominations at the 2018 Tony Awards, for Best Play and Best Featured Actress in a Play (Findlay).

The Australian co-production by the Melbourne Theatre Company and the Sydney Theatre Company won the 2018 Helpmann Award for Best Play. Its director, Sarah Goodes, won the 2018 Helpmann Award for Best Direction of a Play and Pamela Rabe won the 2018 Helpmann Award for Best Female Actor in a Play.

A production of the play ran in Toronto at the Canadian Stage Theater from 25 September to 21 October 2017. The Steppenwolf Theatre in Chicago ran a production of the play, directed by Jonathan Berry, from 18 April to 9 June 2019.

The Houston premiere of the play, directed by Brandon Weinbrenner, ran at Rec Room Arts from 9 November to 7 December 2019.

Alumnae Theatre in Toronto staged a production running 8 March to 23 March 2024.

Nottingham Playhouse has announced it will revive the play in early 2024.

In 2025 Lucy Kirkwood gave permission for the Queensland premiere to be set in Australia, with related minor script changes. A possible nuclear energy future was a key issue in the 2025 Australian federal election campaign. The production was staged at PIP Theatre, produced by A Moveable Theatre and Amanda McErlean and directed by Heidi Gledhill.

== Reception ==
In 2019, writers for The Guardian placed The Children third on a list of the greatest theatrical works since 2000.

== Awards and nominations ==
=== Original Broadway production ===
Year	Award	Category	Nominee	Result
2018	Tony Award	Best Play		Nominated
2018	Tony Award	Best Featured Actress in a Play	Deborah Findlay	Nominated

=== Original Australian production ===
Year	Award	Category	Nominee	Result
2018	Helpmann Awards	Best Play		Won
2018	Helpmann Awards	Best Female Actor in a Play	Pamela Rabe	Won
2018	Helpmann Awards	Best Direction of a Play	Sarah Goodes	Won
