= The Smoke (TV series) =

British drama television series

- Genre: Drama
- Created by: Lucy Kirkwood
- Written by: Lucy Kirkwood; Chloe Moss; Daragh Carville; Tim Price
- Directed by: Mike Barker; Samuel Donovan; Julian Holmes
- Starring: Jamie Bamber; Jodie Whittaker; Rhashan Stone; Taron Egerton; Pippa Bennett-Warner; Gerard Kearns; Dorian Lough; David Walmsley; Martyn Ellis
- Country of origin: United Kingdom
- Original language: English
- No. of series: 1
- No. of episodes: 8

Production
- Production location: London
- Running time: 60 minutes (Including Advertisements)

Original release
- Network: Sky1
- Release: 20 February – 10 April 2014

The Smoke is a British firefighter television drama that debuted on Sky1 on 20 February 2014. The series was created and written by Lucy Kirkwood and stars Jamie Bamber, Taron Egerton, Jodie Whittaker and Rhashan Stone.

The show was cancelled after one series.

== Plot ==
The series describes the high-adrenaline adventures of White Watch, a team of London firefighters. Leading the crew is Kev, a good man injured and betrayed during the worst fire of his career. Standing by Kev's side as he returns to work is his gutsy girlfriend Trish and his cocksure friend and fellow firefighter Mal. Other members of the crew include the fearless Ziggy and the mysterious new boy Dennis.

== Cast ==
=== Main ===
- Jamie Bamber as Kev Allison, the leader of White Watch.
- Jodie Whittaker as Trish Tooley, Kev's supportive girlfriend.
- Rhashan Stone as Mal Milligan, a member of White Watch and Kev's best friend.
- Taron Egerton as Dennis "Asbo" Severs, the rookie of White Watch with a troubled past.
- Pippa Bennett-Warner as Ziggy Brown, a member of White Watch.
- Gerard Kearns as Little Al, a member of White Watch.
- Dorian Lough as Billy "Mince", a member of White Watch.
- David Walmsley as Rob, a member of White Watch.
- Martyn Ellis as Big Al, station manager.

=== Recurring ===
- Amit Shah as Nick Chandrakala, White Watch Commander.
- Sam Gittins as Gog, the one responsible for Kev's accident.
- Sinead Matthews as Julia Tooley, Trish's sister.
- Elizabeth Berrington as Pauline Pynchon, a therapist.

== Episodes ==
| No. | Title | Directed by | Written by | Original release date | Viewers |
|---|---|---|---|---|---|
| 1 | "Episode 1" | Mike Barker | Lucy Kirkwood | 20 February 2014 | 939,000 |
Fire chief Kev returns to duty after receiving serious injuries at the hands of arsonists.
| 2 | "Episode 2" | Mike Barker | Lucy Kirkwood | 27 February 2014 | 807,000 |
Emotional wounds are reopened when Kev and Mal fall out after witnessing a tragic accident, paving the way for a threatening figure to get closer to Kev.
| 3 | "Episode 3" | Samuel Donovan | Lucy Kirkwood | 6 March 2014 | 659,000 |
It's the morning after the night before and morale is low in White Watch as the team launch a risky rescue attempt. Kev discovers that Gog, a friend of fellow firefighter Asbo, was the thug responsible for his injuries and Little Al gets in over his head at a cage fight. Guest Starring: Jessica-Jane Clement as Tanya the ring girl and Geoff Bell as Betting Thug
| 4 | "Episode 4" | Samuel Donovan | Lucy Kirkwood, Chloe Moss & Tim Price | 13 March 2014 | 632,000 |
Things get very personal during a rescue when a secret of Ziggy's is exposed. The firefighters use a crane to rescue a very fat woman from her burning house. Meanwhile, Kev gets revenge on Gog by taking his pit bull to the dog pound and Trish shares some shocking news.
| 5 | "Episode 5" | Julian Holmes | Lucy Kirkwood & Daragh Carville | 20 March 2014 | 623,000 |
The animosity between Dennis (Asbo) and Mal reaches boiling point, which has explosive consequences during a rescue at a dilapidated building. Meanwhile Trish visits her daughter. Guest Starring: Lolita Chakrabarti as Rachel
| 6 | "Episode 6" | Julian Holmes | Lucy Kirkwood | 27 March 2014 | 641,000 |
It's the one-year anniversary of the Churchill Estate fire and, while Dennis reaches breaking point, information comes to light that could lead Kev to the truth. Guest Starring: Gary Lewis as Dennis's father
| 7 | "Episode 7" | Mike Barker | Lucy Kirkwood | 3 April 2014 | 734,000 |
The powerful drama intensifies as White Watch try to save Trish from an explosive situation in the Blackwall Tunnel. Guest Starring: Simone McAullay as Nurse Janine
| 8 | "Episode 8" | Mike Barker | Lucy Kirkwood | 10 April 2014 | 675,000 |
Following the Blackwall Tunnel explosion, Kev takes drastic measures to move on. Gog is subjected to an arson attack by Rosa, a mother whose baby was murdered by Gog in the first episode.

== Reception ==
Sam Wollaston of The Guardian was positive, remarking the first episode, 'crackles along with a tidy script and some nice performances, though it's really more about plot than getting inside the souls of its characters.' Ellen E Jones of The Independent was also positive, remarking that, 'The script by fêted young playwright Lucy Kirkwood was also full of warm moments of the non-third-degree-burn-causing kind, like a raucous sing-a-long to Adele's "Someone Like You" in the back of the fire engine'. Tom Rowley in The Telegraph found it full of familiar cliches, but found it showed promise. The Times gave it four stars.

As the series broadcast, the London Fire Brigade used social media to send out fire safety tips and encouraged members of the public to tweet or post on Facebook their own fire escape plans.

== See also ==
- London's Burning
- Steel River Blues
- Chicago Fire
