= Bernadette Robinson =

Australian singer and actor

Bernadette Robinson is an Australian singer and actor.

Robinson was born in Sydney and grew up in Melbourne where she attended the Victorian College of the Arts and was taught opera by Joan Hammond.

She is best known for her ability to sing in the style of many well-known female singers. These skills were featured in the stage productions Songs for Nobodies, directed by Simon Phillips, and Pennsylvania Avenue, both written for her by Joanna Murray-Smith. She appeared with her show The Show Goes On in 2017 at the Sydney Opera House.

Robinson was nominated for a Helpmann Award for Best Female Actor in a Play in 2012 for Songs for Nobodies.
