= Love and Information =

Play by Caryl Churchill

- Original language: English
- Written by: Caryl Churchill

Premiere
- Date: September 2012
- Place: Royal Court Theatre

Love and Information is a play written by the British playwright Caryl Churchill. It first opened at the Royal Court Theatre in September 2012. It received many positive reviews from critics.

== Synopsis ==
The play is a compilation of seven sections each with a number of scenes that range from less than a minute in length to a few minutes long. The seven sections of the play must be done in order; however, the scenes/vignettes within each section can be done in whatever order the director wishes. The "random" section of scenes, included at the end of the play, are able to be incorporated anywhere within the play. The loose structure of the play and the wide range of casting options—nothing is specific in terms of casting—allows the director ample freedom to develop the storyline of the play along with the particular themes and questions they want to highlight with their production. Within the play are over 100 characters, but none of the characters are named and they can be double cast. After watching the play, writer Jennifer Wilkinson wrote, "The play asks us to consider how meaning is constructed and to participate in the process. The script has few stage directions, the characters are not gendered, the scenes can appear in a different order, and there are some random scenes which can be inserted anywhere in the play. This gives any director and company broad scope for creative input."

== Production history ==
=== Original production ===
The original production of Love and Information was performed by the Royal Court Theatre. It was directed by James Macdonald. The run time of this play was about an hour and 40 minutes. Macdonald's "energetic production supplies much in the way of context, anchoring each episode in a particular place and creating a kind of social kaleidoscope in the process." In this production, Macdonald cast 16 actors to rotate around and play a large variety of characters throughout the play. The set was designed by Miriam Buether. She created a "clinical white-cube set, each piece [had] a slightly hallucinatory distinctness. Kristin Tillotson of the Minnesota Star Tribune wrote: "Caryl Churchill's sound-bite exploration of the modern state of human connections and the ever-increasing onslaught of knowledge both useless and profound has something for everyone, especially those with short attention spans. ... [this play] reminds us that no matter how many sophisticated modes of communicating with other flawed humans that we can access, we'll still manage to misconstrue, misconvey, then kiss and make up, just like always."

Macdonald also helmed a production at the Minetta Lane Theatre in New York City, presented as a co-production between New York Theatre Workshop and the Royal Court, from February 4 through April 6, 2014. The production, which included Noah Galvin, Maria Tucci, and James Waterston, was slightly "tweaked" in collaboration with its American cast.

=== Other notable productions ===
Minneapolis-based Frank Theatre produced Love and Information January 30-February 22 of 2015. This production went on at the Ritz Theatre in Minneapolis, MN. The show was directed by Wendy Knox and featured Patrick Bailey, Virginia Burke, Joy Dolo, Kirby Bennett, Katherine Ferrand, Tessa Flynn, Emily Grodzik, Brianne Hill, Leif Jurgensen, Taous Khazem, Sam Pearson, Elohim Pena and Carl Schoenborn.

Malthouse Theatre and Sydney Theatre Company co-produced an Australian production which opened in Melbourne in June 2015 and toured to Sydney in July 2015. The show was directed by Kip Williams and featured an ensemble cast of Ursula Yovich, Anita Hegh, Alison Whyte, Zahra Newman, Marco Chiappi, Glenn Hazeldine, Anthony Taufa, and Harry Greenwood. The acclaimed production received two Green Room Awards nominations, four Sydney Theatre Awards Nominations, and a nomination for Williams for the Helpmann Award for Best Direction of a Play.

Lyric Theatre (Hammersmith) produced Love and Information on the 9 and 10 of August 2016. The show was directed by Sherrill Gow and performed by the Lyric Young Company.

Mohit Takalkar directed Caryl Churchill’s Love and Information for National Centre for the Performing Arts (India) in April 2024 with a cast of 13. The piece was played out in multiple languages like English, Hindi, Marathi, Hariyanvi and Gujarati.

== Reception ==
Elin Diamond of Rutgers University lauded Churchill's text as "beautifully wrought". Michael Billington of The Guardian awarded the Royal Court Theatre performance four out of five stars and argued that the playwright "is saying that we have to be [the master of technology] rather than its slave and learn how to live with the cascade of fact and opinion. [...] For me, Churchill suggests, with compassionate urgency, that our insatiable appetite for knowledge needs to be informed by our capacity for love." Matthew Tucker of HuffPost UK wrote that the success of the performance is "only partly down to the succinct and thought-provoking script – director James Macdonald has taken a gift of a play, with dialogue that is open to huge interpretation, and has run with it." The critic stated that while some may consider it a gimmick, "the form of the play speaks volumes about the fast turnover of modern life – our jobs, our homes, relationships, media – a pervading sense of impermanence many people feel."

Ben Brantley of The New York Times lauded Love and Information as a "thought-churning, deeply poignant new play", arguing, "As a whole, these parts compel us to think about the paradoxical variety and similarity in the ways we try to make sense of our universe and our place in it. And every little snippet of a play here leaves us wondering about what happened before and what happens after what we’ve seen." Slant's Jason Fitzgerald wrote that Macdonald "turns a play that’s intellectually interesting but potentially tedious into a funny, vivacious, and often tender cornucopia of human experience." Fitzgerald said that the playwright "makes lyrical irony out of our inability to make sense of our universe". Calling Churchill "not only one of the most radically inventive dramatists of the modern era but also one of the most trenchantly observant", Charles McNulty of Los Angeles Times said that "she appears to concur with her dramatic forebears from 21/2 millenniums ago that knowledge must be irradiated by emotion to become wisdom. Churchill lays bare the frenetic zeitgeist with surgical precision, but she allows mystery and poetry to hold sway."

Jesse Green of Vulture wrote that some scenelets "are not developed enough to build much internal drama, and the sequencing of them builds none. [...] a few scenes are too smarty-pants to produce any direct satisfaction. Focusing on that, though, is to ignore the other kinds of pleasure and information the play is providing." Green said that "the writing remains ripe with the recognizable Churchillian qualities of wit and paradox, astringency and forgiveness." Chris Jones of Chicago Tribune criticized director Shawn Douglass' production because "the individual scenes are mostly not specific and fully realized enough that you can believe they really are happening", but said that the play itself is "a terrific and important play". John Del Signore of Gothamist praIsed the work for avoiding being heavy-handed: "Churchill [...] is not here to condemn our Information Age, but to understand how it's changed us". The critic stated, "A few of the shorter scenes have the disposable feel of cheap one-liners [...] But other short scenes are surprisingly affecting, and the overall tone is whimsical and sweet."

Karen Fricker stated in Toronto Star that "it’s the brilliant specificity of Churchill’s observations and the clarity of her writing that linger long after the performance is over". In 2018, Catherine Love of The Guardian noted the "diverse forms of Churchill's writing" despite giving the performance she had seen three out of five stars and comparing it unfavorably to the original performance directed by Macdonald. Dmitry Samarov of Chicago Reader argued, "By employing a crazy-quilt approach to storytelling, Churchill ably evokes the mediated existence most of us are currently drowning in. It's a place where context is removed, meaning is only fleetingly visible, and distraction passes for hope." Chicago's Malvika Jolly called the play "poignant".

Some reviews were less favorable. Now's Glenn Sumi wrote that "the play’s barrage of data becomes as overwhelming as the stuff on our screens, with only intermittent moments holding our interest. [...] There’s too much information in this play, and too little love." J. Kelly Nestruck of The Globe and Mail stated that the play leaves one with that "uneasy, queasy feeling that you get after spending a similar amount of time on Facebook or Twitter." John Nathan of The Jewish Chronicle admitted to "a nagging doubt that it would not have made it to the stage if it had not been written by the Royal Court’s most revered living writer", and stated that "sometimes the message is buried in banal exchanges — so deeply it might as well not be there at all."

Michael Lake of The Coast called it a beautiful mess and wrote, "At its best, Love and Information feels like getting tiny glimpses into huge worlds. When it achieves this, we feel the weight of many small moments strung together, and the promise that it might all add up to something. We see friends, lovers, parents, children, strangers, all trying hard to connect, or to say something to one another. At its worst, it feels like a constant scrolling through your newsfeed and seeing something catch your eye but not stopping to find out what it is." In The Telegraph, Charles Spencer dubbed Love and Information "the dramatic equivalent of going through countless emails, some interesting, some touching, some funny, some alarming, and many downright dull. A bewildering sense of information overload sets in and on my return from the theatre I realised that probably only half a dozen of the many scenes had lodged themselves firmly in my memory. So I read the play and once again a good deal of it still failed to linger in my mind." He argued, of the vignette in which a woman confides to a young boy that she is his mother, that Churchill insufficiently explores the emotional consequences.

== General references ==
- Churchill, Caryl. Love and Information. New York: Theatre Communications Group, 2013. Print.
- Cousin, Geraldine. Churchill, the Playwright. London: Methuen Drama, 1989. Print.
- Gagliano, Lynne, and Caitlin McLeod. Love and Information: Background Pack. London: Royal Court Theatre. PDF.
- Kritzer, Amelia Howe. Open-ended Inquiries: The Plays of Caryl Churchill. Ann Arbor, MI: U Microfilms Internat., 1988. Print.
- "Love and Information - Frank Theatre." Frank Theatre. Web. 201.
- Lyall, Sarah. "The Mysteries of Caryl Churchill." New York Times 5 Dec. 2004. Print.
- Selmon, Michael Layne. Engendering Drama: Caryl Churchill and the Stages of Reform. College Park, Md: U of Maryland, 1988. Print.
- Taylor, Paul. The Independent. Independent Digital News and Media, 18 Sept. 2012. Web.
- Thompson, Tim. The Embodied Mind: Character and Subjectivity in the Work of Samuel Beckett, Tom Stoppard, Caryl Churchill and Jacques Lacan. 1996. Print.
- Tillotson, Kristin. "'Love and Information': Snapshots of Modern Communication." Star Tribune. 4 Feb. 2015. Web.
- Tripney, Natasha. "Love and Information." The Stage. 20 Sept. 2015. Web. Wilkinson, Jennifer. "Love and Information." Socialist Review. Oct. 2012. Web.
