= Sarah Goodes =

Australian theatre director

Sarah Goodes is an Australian theatre director.

She graduated from the Victorian College of the Arts with a masters of theatre directing, was the associate director for the Melbourne Theatre Company from 2016 to 2020 and resident director at the Sydney Theatre Company from 2012 to 2016.

Goodes' 2018 production of The Children by Lucy Kirkwood won three Helpmann Awards including Best Director.

In 2023 she directed the world premiere of Joanna Murray-Smith's one woman show Julia, a play which imagines the life of first female prime minister, Julia Gillard, starring Australian actress Justine Clarke. The play opened at the Canberra Theatre Centre and was followed by an STC season at the Sydney Opera House. In 2024 it toured Melbourne and Adelaide and had return seasons in Canberra and Sydney. 2025 saw the play performed in Brisbane and Wollongong, with a return season in Melbourne.

Goodes had previously directed another of Joanna Murray-Smith's works, Switzerland.
