= Lucy Kirkwood =

British playwright and screenwriter

Lucy Ann Kirkwood FRSL (born c. 1984) is a British playwright and screenwriter. She is known for her plays Chimerica (2013) and The Children (2016).

== Early life and education ==
Kirkwood was born in Leytonstone around 1984 and raised in east London. She has a degree in English literature from the University of Edinburgh, where she performed as part of an improvisational comedy troupe, the Improverts and wrote for the Edinburgh University Theatre Company.

== Career ==
=== Plays ===
In 2005, Kirkwood wrote and starred in her first play, Grady Hot Potato, at the Bedlam Theatre. It was also selected for the National Student Drama Festival.

The following year, in 2006, Kirkwood took two productions of her second play, Geronimo to the Edinburgh Fringe, under the title The Umbilical Project. The two productions, Cut and Uncut, were an experiment in cutting the cord between writer and production. Uncut was directed by Kirkwood herself and Cut by a completely separate company under the direction of Matt Addicott. No contact was made between the two companies during the rehearsal period, prompting the tag line "Two casts, two crews, two directors, two venues, one new play... no communication".

Kirkwood's third play, Guns or Butter, about soldiers being overcome by the horror of war, was written for the Terror 2007 Festival at the Union Theatre, London.

Tinderbox, a dark comedy set in a fictional 21st-century England, premiered at the Bush Theatre in April 2008 starring Jamie Foreman and Sheridan Smith. She also contributed to the Bush's 50 Ways to Leave Your Lover, a play co-created in collaboration with Leah Chillery, Ben Ellis, Stacey Gregg, Morgan Lloyd Malcolm and Ben Schiffer which debuted in July 2008, and was revised and restaged in December of the same year. Her short horror piece Psychogeography premiered at the Bush in 2008 and was revived at Southwark Playhouse. Her version of Ibsen's Hedda Gabler, titled Hedda, premiered at London's Gate Theatre in 2008 to favourable reviews.

Kirkwood's promenade play about sex trafficking, It Felt Empty When the Heart Went At First but It Is Alright Now, was produced by Clean Break Theatre at the Arcola Theatre in October 2009.

Her short play Bloody Wimmin debuted at the Tricycle Theater (now the Kiln Theatre) as part of their Women, Power and Politics season in June 2010. Additionally, a fresh and humorous version of Beauty and the Beast was devised by Kirkwood and director Katie Mitchell and written by Kirkwood. It premiered at the National Theatre in London as Christmas show in December 2010.

In January 2011 her one-woman short play Small Hours debuted at Hampstead Theatre.

In October 2012, Kirkwood's play NSFW premiered at the Royal Court Theatre, starring Janie Dee and Julian Barrett and directed by Simon Godwin.

In May 2013, Kirkwood's play Chimerica, which examines the relationship between the US and China since the Tiananmen Square protests through the eyes of a former activist, and features over forty scene changes and British-Chinese actors, opened at the Almeida Theatre. The play transferred to the West End a few months later, in August 2013. The play's title echoes the portmanteau word "Chimerica", invented by economists to define the intertwined economies of the US and China. At the 2014 Olivier Awards, Chimerica won for best new play, best director (Lyndsey Turner), best lighting (Tim Lutkin and Finn Ross), best sound (Carolyn Downing), and best set design (Es Devlin).

Kirkwood was writer in residence at Clean Break, a theatre company focused on telling the stories of imprisoned women, in 2015.

Kirkwood's play The Children opened at the Royal Court Theatre in November 2016, directed by James Macdonald and starring Ron Cook, Francesca Annis and Deborah Findlay, receiving positive reviews from critics. The production transferred to the Samuel J. Friedman Theatre on Broadway in November 2017 (previews), officially on 12 December 2017, with its original cast. The play was nominated for the 2018 Outer Critics Circle Award as Outstanding New Broadway Play. The play was nominated for the 2018 Tony Award for Best Play and the Tony Award, Best Performance by an Actress in a Featured Role in a Play (Deborah Findlay).

Rufus Norris directed her stage play Mosquitoes, which illustrates family disputes between sisters by referencing collisions in experimental physics, at London's National Theatre in 2017. Kirkwood received a commissioning grant from the Manhattan Theatre Club to write the play. Thomas Bockelmann directed Mosquitoes at the German Staatstheater Kassel on 30 August 2018 as a three-hour stage production.

Kirkwood's next play was titled The Welkin and concerned the case of a woman convicted of murder who claims to be pregnant, preventing a death sentence from being carried out. The play revolves around a group of 12 matrons assembled to determine the truth of her claim. The Welkin was performed at London's National Theatre in the first half of 2020.

In 2021, Kirkwood wrote the play Maryland, which was staged shortly after at the Royal Court Theatre, and later adapted into a BBC dramatic television film.

In June 2022, Kirkwood's play Rapture, opened at the Royal Court Theatre, credited in the marketing under the pseudonym Dave Davidson, and the false title That Is Not Who I Am. The misleading advertisement ties into the themes and world of the story. The play purports to be a verbatim docudrama concerning paranoia and distrust of the UK Government following the 2020 pandemic and ensuing political scandals. It details the relationship, surveillance, and murder of two climate activist content creators, leaving lingering questions about the State's involvement. In the universe of this play, the UK Government has placed an embargo on the Royal Court (or theatre in question) over the contents presented, and the legality of its production are in question. Thus the opening moments of the play include an explanation that the theatre has decided to stage the play covertly. It features both an actor playing Kirkwood and a supposed cameo from the real Kirkwood herself. Kirkwood portrayed this latter version of herself in the original production at select performances.

In 2023, it was announced that Kirkwood would write a new musical adaptation of Roald Dahl's The Witches at London’s National Theatre with music by Dave Malloy and lyrics by both Malloy and Kirkwood. The musical premiered in November 2023.

=== Screenwriting ===
Kirkwood wrote for the second, third, and fourth series of the teen drama Skins, broadcast between 2008 and 2010.

In 2014, her drama series The Smoke, made by Kudos, was televised on Sky 1.

She adapted her play Chimerica into a four-part miniseries for Channel 4, broadcast in 2019, and then wrote the four-part series Adult Material, following a woman's life in the adult film industry.

== Recognition and awards ==
In June 2018 Kirkwood was elected Fellow of the Royal Society of Literature in its "40 Under 40" initiative.

=== Theatre ===
Year	Award	Category	Work	Result
2010	Susan Smith Blackburn Prize		It Felt Empty When The Heart Went At First But It Is Alright Now	Nominated
2013	Critics’ Circle Theatre Award	Best New Play	Chimerica	Won
2013	Evening Standard Theatre Award	Best Play	Chimerica	Won
2014	Laurence Olivier Award	Best New Play	Chimerica	Won
2014	South Bank Sky Arts Award	Theatre	Chimerica	Nominated
2014	Susan Smith Blackburn Prize		Chimerica	Won
2018	Tony Award	Best Play	The Children	Nominated
2018	Outer Critics Circle Award	Outstanding New Broadway Play	The Children	Nominated
