= Suddenly Last Summer =

1958 play by Tennessee Williams

- First edition cover (New Directions)
- Original language: English
- Written by: Tennessee Williams
- Characters: Violet Venable; Sebastian Venable; Catharine Holly; Mrs. Holly; George Holly; Dr. Cukrowicz; Miss Foxhill; Sister Felicity
- Subject: Aging, greed, hypocrisy, sexual repression
- Genre: Drama
- Setting: room and garden of Mrs. Venable's mansion in the Garden District of New Orleans

Premiere
- Date: January 7, 1958 (68 years ago)
- Place: York Playhouse; New York City, New York, U.S.

Suddenly Last Summer is a one-act play by Tennessee Williams, written in New York in 1957. It opened off Broadway on January 7, 1958, as part of a double bill with another of Williams's one-acts, Something Unspoken (written in London in 1951). The presentation of the two plays was given the overall title Garden District, but Suddenly Last Summer is now more often performed alone. Williams said he thought the play "perhaps the most poetic" he had written, and Harold Bloom ranks it among the best examples of the playwright's lyricism.

== Plot ==
In 1936, in the Garden District of New Orleans, (Note: Mrs. Venable tells us that Sebastian's fateful trip with Catharine, during which he failed to write a poem, took place in 1935. The play is set "between late summer and early fall" the following year.) Mrs. Violet Venable, an elderly socialite widow from a prominent local family, has invited a doctor to her home. She talks nostalgically about her son Sebastian, a poet who died under mysterious circumstances on the fictional island of Cabeza de Lobo, not (as it is sometimes assumed) in South America, by referring to Catharine's return "from Europe" aboard the Berengaria, an Atlantic liner. During the course of their conversation, she offers to make a generous donation to support the doctor's psychiatric research if he will perform a lobotomy on Catharine, her niece, who has been confined to St. Mary, a private mental institution, at her expense since returning to America. Mrs. Venable is eager to "make her peaceful" once and for all by erasing her memories of Sebastian's violent death and his homosexuality; Mrs. Venable is especially adamant that Catharine stop talking about the latter, in order to preserve her late son's reputation.

Catharine arrives, followed by her mother and brother. They are also eager to suppress her version of events, since Mrs. Venable is threatening to keep Sebastian's will in probate until she is satisfied, something Catharine's family can't afford to challenge. But the doctor injects Catharine with a truth serum and she proceeds to give a scandalous account of Sebastian's moral dissolution and the events leading up to his death, how he used her to procure young men for his sexual exploitation, and how he was set upon, mutilated, and partially devoured by a mob of starving children in the street. Mrs. Venable lunges at Catharine but is prevented from striking her with her cane. She is taken off stage, screaming "cut this hideous story from her brain!" Far from being convinced of Catharine's insanity, however, the doctor concludes the play by stating he believes her story could be true.

== Analysis ==
From its first page, the script is rich in symbolic detail open to many interpretations. The "mansion of Victorian Gothic style" immediately connects the play with Southern Gothic literature, with which it shares many characteristics. Sebastian's "jungle-garden," with its "violent" colours and noises of "beasts, serpents, and birds ... of savage nature" introduces the images of predation that punctuate much of the play's dialogue. (Note: e.g. after Mrs. Holly says "don't laugh like that; it scares me, Catharine," there is the stage direction "jungle birds scream in the garden") These have been interpreted variously as implying the violence latent in Sebastian himself; depicting modernity's vain attempts to "contain" its atavistic impulses; and standing for a bleak "Darwinian" vision of the world, equating "the primeval past and the ostensibly civilised present." (Note: Thompson sees the opening stage direction as introducing "the dual role of victim and victimizer, predator and prey, engaged in a struggle for survival rather than salvation.)

The Venus flytrap mentioned in the play's opening speech can be read as portraying Sebastian as the "pampered" son, or "hungry for flesh"; (Note: According to Pecorari, the plant is "a rather transparent metaphor for Sebastian himself: Predatory yet vulnerable, perfectly handsome in a delicate, feminine way, like the goddess of beauty, and also hungry for flesh, in his case, adolescent boys instead of flies.") as portraying the "seductive deadliness" concealed beneath Mrs. Venable's "civilized veneer," while she "clings desperately to life" in her "hothouse" home; as a joint "metaphor for Violet and Sebastian, who consume and destroy the people around them"; as symbolising nature's cruelty, like the "flesh-eating birds" of the Galapagos; as symbolising "a primitive state of desire," and so on.

Williams referred to symbols as "the natural language of drama" and "the purest language of plays." The ambiguity arising from the abundance of symbolism is therefore not unfamiliar to his audiences. What poses a unique difficulty to critics of Suddenly Last Summer is the absence of its protagonist. All we can know of Sebastian must be gleaned from the conflicting accounts given by two characters of questionable sanity, leaving him "a figure of unresolvable contradiction."

In spite of its difficulties, however, the play's recurrent images of predation and cannibalism (Note: e.g. Catharine tells us how Sebastian talked about people, as if they were items on a menu – 'That one's delicious-looking, that one is appetizing' ... blonds were next on the menu ... Cousin Sebastian said he was famished for blonds"; she describes the "hot, ravenous mouth" of the married man she met at the Mardi Gras ball.) point to Catharine's cynical pronouncement as key to understanding the playwright's intentions: "we all use each other," she says in Scene 4, "and that's what we think of as love." Accordingly, Williams commented on a number of occasions that Sebastian's death was intended to show how:

Man devours man in a metaphorical sense. He feeds upon his fellow creatures, without the excuse of animals. Animals actually do it for survival, out of hunger ... I use that metaphor [of cannibalism] to express my repulsion with this characteristic of man, the way people use each other without conscience ... people devour each other.

== Productions and Adaptations ==
=== 1958 original New York production ===
The first production of the play was performed off-Broadway, starting on January 7, 1958. Produced alongside Something Unspoken under the collective title Garden District, it was staged by the York Playhouse company at the York Theatre on First Avenue in New York. Anne Meacham won an Obie Award (Annual Off-Broadway Theatre Awards) for her performance as Catherine. The production also featured Hortense Alden as Mrs. Venable, Robert Lansing as Dr. Cukrowicz, Eleanor Phelps as Mrs. Holly and Alan Mixon as George Holly, and was directed by Herbert Machiz, with the set designed by Robert Soule and costumes by Stanley Simmons. Incidental music was by Ned Rorem.

=== 1958 original London production ===
The play's London debut was presented, under club conditions, at the Arts Theatre on September 16, 1958, running until October 11. (The venue, though situated in the West End, was a club and therefore not technically a West End theatre.) Directed, like the off Broadway production, by Herbert Machiz, it was coupled once again with Something Unspoken, with the cast headed by Patricia Neal as Catherine, Beatrix Lehmann as Mrs. Venable and David Cameron as Dr Cukrowicz. The set was by Stanley Moore, the costumes by Michael Ellis, and the music by Ned Rorem.

=== 1959 film ===
The film version was released by Columbia Pictures in 1959, starring Elizabeth Taylor, Katharine Hepburn and Montgomery Clift; it was directed by Joseph L. Mankiewicz from a screenplay by Gore Vidal and Williams. The movie differs greatly from the stage version, adding many scenes, characters and subplots. The Hollywood Production Code forced the filmmakers to cut out the explicit references to homosexuality. The film received three Academy Award nominations: Hepburn and Taylor were both nominated for Best Actress in a Leading Role, and it was also up for Best Art Direction-Set Decoration, Black-and-White.

=== 1993 BBC TV play ===
The play was adapted for BBC Television in 1993 under the direction of Royal National Theatre head Richard Eyre and starring Maggie Smith, Rob Lowe, Richard E. Grant and Natasha Richardson. It aired in the United States on PBS as an episode of Great Performances. Smith was nominated for an Emmy Award for Outstanding Actress in a Miniseries or TV Movie. According to Lowe, his personal driver during production was also the personal driver for Montgomery Clift on the 1959 film.

=== 1995 Broadway debut ===
The play made its Broadway debut in 1995. It was performed together with Something Unspoken, the other one-act play that it originally appeared with under the title Garden District. It was presented by the Circle in the Square Theatre. The cast included Elizabeth Ashley, Victor Slezak and Celia Weston.

=== 1999 West End debut ===
The play debuted in the West End in 1999 at the Comedy Theatre, London, starring Sheila Gish as Mrs. Venable, Rachel Weisz as Catharine, Gerard Butler as Dr. Cukrowicz and directed by Sean Mathias.

=== 2004 West End revival ===
Michael Grandage directed a 2004 production at the Lyceum Theatre, Sheffield, featuring Diana Rigg as Mrs. Venable and Victoria Hamilton as Catherine. The production toured nationally before transferring to the Albery Theatre, London. The production received enthusiastic reviews, and Hamilton won the Evening Standard Theatre Award for Best Actress for her performance.

=== 2006 off-Broadway ===
An off-Broadway production in 2006 by the Roundabout Theatre Company starred Blythe Danner, Gale Harold and Carla Gugino.

=== 2015 Sydney Theatre Company ===
The play was part of the Sydney Theatre Company's 2015 season. Director Kip Williams blended live camerawork with traditional stagecraft in a production starring Eryn Jean Norvill as Catherine and Robyn Nevin as Venable. The production received three nominations at the 2015 Helpmann Awards, with Nevin nominated for Best Actress, the production nominated for Best Play, and Williams winning for Best Director.

=== 2017 Théâtre de l'Odéon, Paris ===
A French translation of the play was staged at the Théâtre de l'Odéon in March-April 2017. Stéphane Braunschweig directed Luce Mouchel as Mrs. Venable, Marie Rémond as Catherine, Jean-Baptiste Anoumon as Dr. Cukrowicz, Océane Cairaty as Miss Foxhill, Virginie Colemyn as Mrs. Holly, Glenn Marausse as George, and Boutaïna El Fekkak as Sœur Félicité.

=== 2026 opera adaptation ===
A new opera adaptation of the play, composed by Courtney Bryan with a libretto by Gideon Lester and Daniel Fish, premiered at Bard SummerScape from June 25 to July 19, 2026.

=== 2027 National Theatre adaptation ===
A revival running between February 19 and April 24, 2027 has been announced at the National Theatre in London, UK, starring Emma Corrin and Harriet Walter.

== See also ==
- List of one-act plays by Tennessee Williams
