= Joanna Murray-Smith =

Australian playwright (born 1962)

Joanna Murray-Smith AM
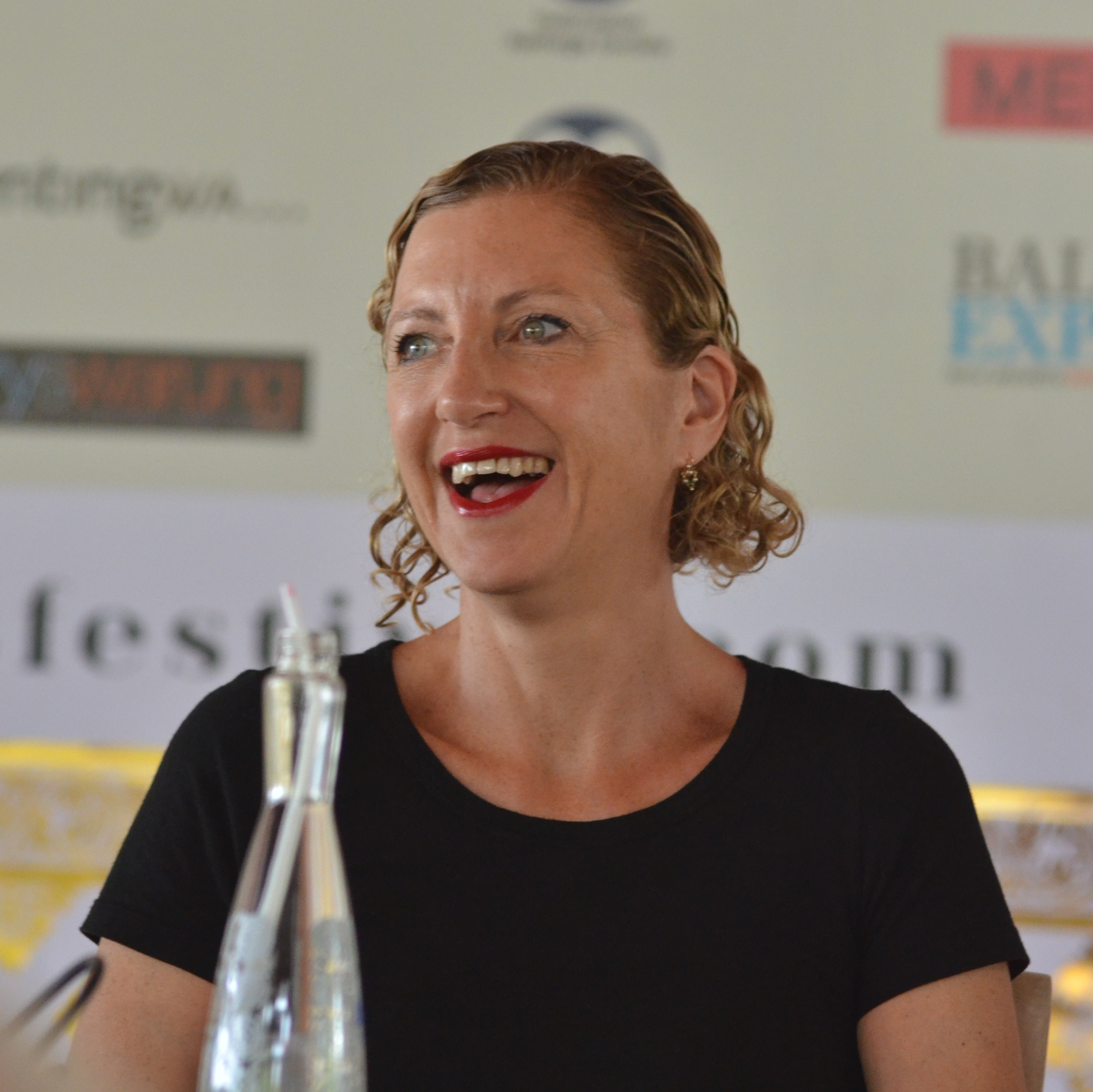
- Murray-Smith in 2012
- Born: 17 April 1962; Mount Eliza, Victoria, Australia
- Occupations: Playwright, screenwriter, novelist, librettist, and newspaper columnist
- Writing career
- Notable awards: 2016 Mona Brand Award, winner

Joanna Murray-Smith AM (born 17 April 1962) is an Australian playwright, screenwriter, novelist, librettist, and newspaper columnist.

== Early life and education ==
Joanna Murray-Smith was born on 17 April 1962 in Mount Eliza, Victoria. Her father was the literary editor and academic Stephen Murray-Smith (1922–1988), and her uncle was the actor John Bluthal.

She attended Toorak College and graduated with a BA (Hons) from the University of Melbourne. On a Rotary International Scholarship in 1995, Murray-Smith attended the writing program at Columbia University, New York.

== Recognition ==
In 2000 she was awarded a Commonwealth Medal for Services to Playwriting, and in 2012 she was made a Vice-Chancellor's Fellow at the University of Melbourne.

In the 2025 Australia Day Honours, Murray-Smith was appointed a Member of the Order of Australia "for significant service to the performing arts as a writer".

== Personal life ==
She is married to Raymond Gill and has two sons and one daughter.

In 2003, she took a sabbatical in Italy.

== Notable productions ==
Many of Murray-Smith's plays have been performed around the world. Honour has been produced in more than three dozen countries, including productions on Broadway and at the Royal National Theatre in London.

=== Honour ===
Honour was created in 1995 when Murray-Smith was studying in the writing program at Columbia University in New York. There, the play's first public appearance was in a reading with Meryl Streep, Sam Waterston, and Kyra Sedgwick. The play was then performed at the Belasco Theatre on Broadway in 1998 with Jane Alexander, Robert Foxworth, Laura Linney and Enid Graham; it earned Tony Award nominations for Alexander and Graham. It was performed at London's Royal National Theatre with Eileen Atkins who won best actress in the Laurence Olivier Awards for the role. Its West End performance took place at Wyndham's Theatre in 2006 with Diana Rigg, Martin Jarvis, and Natascha McElhone. The play was remounted in London in 2018 at the Park Theatre, starring Henry Goodman and Imogen Stubbs in the lead roles.

=== Ridge’s Lovers ===
Ridge's Lovers was performed in New York under the direction of Brian Leahy Doyle.

=== Scenes from a Marriage ===
Scenes from a Marriage was performed in January 2008 at the Belgrade Theatre, Coventry, directed by Trevor Nunn, with Iain Glen and Imogen Stubbs. Nunn recast the production for its West End season at the St James Theatre in 2013; Olivia Williams and Mark Bazeley played the warring couple. The adaptation was produced in Australia at Queensland Theatre in 2017 starring Marta Dusseldorp and her husband Ben Winspear.

=== The Female of the Species ===
The Female of the Species, based on events in the life of Germaine Greer, opened in the West End at the Vaudeville Theatre in July 2008, directed by Roger Michell and starring Eileen Atkins. A Broadway production, originally planned for 2008 with Annette Bening was postponed. It was nominated for Best New Comedy in the 2009 Olivier Awards. In February and March 2010, the play was staged at the Geffen Playhouse in Los Angeles with David Arquette and Bening. Charles Isherwood of The New York Times wrote about this production: "The Female of the Species is not just antifeminist. In its depiction of women as variously pompous, deluded, self-obsessed, hypocritical, sexually obsequious or just plain crazy, it comes closer to being antifemale."

=== Switzerland ===
Switzerland was commissioned by the Geffen Theatre in Los Angeles but by arrangement with the Sydney Theatre Company artistic directors Andrew Upton and Cate Blanchett had its world premiere production at the Sydney Theatre Company starring Sarah Peirse as Patricia Highsmith in 2014. A new production of Switzerland was produced at the Geffen Theatre in 2015 directed by Mark Brokaw and starred Laura Linney in the Highsmith role. The play was also produced at the Melbourne Theatre Company, the Queensland Theatre Company, the State Theatre Company of South Australia and Black Swan Theatre, Perth. It has been produced in numerous productions in Germany, Denmark and Switzerland. In 2019 it played an off-Broadway season at 59E59 Theaters in New York City. Its UK premiere was in 2018 at the Theatre Royal, Bath, starring Phyllis Logan as Highsmith. The production moved to the West End in November 2018 at the Ambassadors Theatre.

=== Songs for Nobodies ===
Murray-Smith's 2010 one-woman play written for Bernadette Robinson, Songs for Nobodies, opened immediately after Switzerland at the same theatre in January 2019 and marked Robinson's West End debut. The show was nominated for an Olivier award. Songs for Nobodies has toured Australian cities starring Robinson three times since its 2010 premiere production. The play's first production featuring another performer in the role was in New Zealand in 2017 and 2018 when Ali Harper performed the play. Its US premiere at Milwaukee Rep in 2018 starred Bethany Thomas, who also performed the role at the Northlight Theatre in Chicago in May 2020.

=== L'Appartement ===
Murray-Smith made her directorial debut when Queensland Theatre produced her 2019 comedy L'Appartement.

=== Julia ===
In 2023, a production of Julia, written by Murray-Smith and produced by the Sydney Theatre Company and Canberra Theatre Centre, premiered at the Sydney Opera House. The play, a one-woman drama about Julia Gillard, Australia's first female prime minister, then went on to seasons in Melbourne and Canberra. The play begins and ends with Gillard's powerful misogyny speech to parliament in 2012 and details Gillard's early life and her pathway to power. Directed by Sarah Goodes and starring Justine Clarke and Jessica Bentley, the production played in Melbourne and Canberra in mid-2024, and was presented by the State Theatre Company of South Australia in Adelaide in August 2024.

== Works ==
The plays and novels of Murray-Smith have been translated and performed widely around the world.Fourteen of the plays have been published by Currency Press (Australia) and others have been published by Nick Hern Books (UK) and Dramatist Play Service (US). According to the Australia Council, Murray-Smith and Daniel Keene account for half of all foreign productions of Australian plays. However, Murray-Smith feels that within Australia, and especially at the Sydney Theatre Company, her work and that of other Australian writers, e.g., David Williamson's, is insufficiently supported.

=== Plays ===
- Angry Young Penguins, 1987 (Church Theatre, Melbourne) (see also: Ern Malley)
- Atlanta, 1990 (Playbox Theatre Company, Melbourne)
- Love Child, 1993 (Playbox Theatre Company)
- Ridge's Lovers, 1993 (La Mama, Melbourne)
- Flame, 1994 (Griffin Theatre Company, Sydney)
- Honour, 1995 (Playbox Theatre Company)
- Redemption, 1997 (Playbox Theatre Company)
- Nightfall, 1999 (Playbox Theatre Company)
- Bombshells, 2001 (Melbourne Theatre Company, written for Caroline O'Connor)
- Rapture, 2002 (Playbox Theatre Company)
- The Female of the Species, 2006 (Melbourne Theatre Company)
- Ninety, 2008 (Melbourne Theatre Company)
- Scenes from a Marriage, 2008 (based on the 1973 Bergman film) (Belgrade Theatre Coventry)
- Rockabye, 2009 (Melbourne Theatre Company)
- Songs for Nobodies, 2010 (Melbourne Theatre Company, written for Bernadette Robinson)
- The Gift, 2011 (Melbourne Theatre Company)
- Day One, a Hotel, Evening, 2011 (Red Stitch Actors Theatre, Melbourne)
- True Minds, 2013 (Melbourne Theatre Company)
- Fury, 2013 (Sydney Theatre Company)
- Hedda Gabler, 2013 (adaptation of Ibsen play, [State Theatre Company of South Australia]
- Switzerland, 2014 (Sydney Theatre Company)
- Pennsylvania Avenue, 2014 (Melbourne Theatre Company, written for Bernadette Robinson)
- American Song, 2016 (Milwaukee Rep)
- Three Little Words, 2017 (Melbourne Theatre Company)
- Fury (revised), 2018
- L'Appartement, 2019 (Queensland Theatre)
- Berlin, 2021 (Melbourne Theatre Company)
- Rio Sombrio, 2022 (National Theatre of Portugal/ Teatro Nacional D. Maria II)
- Julia, 2023 (Sydney Theatre Company, Canberra Theatre Centre, Melbourne Theatre Company)
- The Talented Mr. Ripley, 2025 (Based on the novel of the same name) (Sydney Theatre Company)

=== Novels ===
- Truce, 1994 ISBN 978-0-14-015252-4
- Judgement Rock, 2002 ISBN 978-0-14-025429-7
- Sunnyside, 2005 ISBN 978-0-14-300536-0

=== Other ===
- The Poems of Ern Malley (ed) 1988, ISBN 978-0-04-150088-2
- Georgia, 1988 (film)
- Cassidy, 1989 (for ABC Television, after the novel by Morris West)
- "Mimi Goes to the Analyst" in Six Pack, 1992 (for SBS TV)
- "Greed" in Seven Deadly Sins, 1993 (for ABC Television)
- Lyrics to a song cycle about Harold Holt, music by Paul Grabowsky
- Janus: episodes "Fit to Plead", "An Unnatural Act", "A Prima Facie Case", 1995 (for ABC Television)
- Libretto to the opera Love in the Age of Therapy, 2002 (by Paul Grabowsky for Opera Australia, Melbourne Festival and Sydney Festival)
- Libretto to The Divorce, 2015 (by Elena Kats-Chernin, for ABC Television)
- Palm Beach, 2019 (film, co-written with director Rachel Ward)
- A Talent for Murder, 2026 (film)
- Uncle Vanya, translation for Melbourne Theatre Company (2026)

== Awards ==
- Australian Film Institute Award nomination in 1989 for the screenplay to Georgia (shared with Ben Lewin, Bob Weis)
- Braille Book of the Year for Judgement Rock
- Victorian Premier's Literary Award: Southbank Pacific Prize for Drama for Honour in 1996
- Victorian Premier's Literary Award: Louis Esson Prize for Drama for Rapture in 2003
- Winner 2004 Fringe First Award, Edinburgh Festival Fringe for Bombshells
- International Dublin Literary Award nomination in 2004 for Judgement Rock
- Winner 2005 London Theatregoers Choice Award for Bombshells
- Final list of twelve of the Miles Franklin Award in 2006 for Sunnyside
- Co-winner New South Wales Premier's Literary Awards (Play Award) 2012 for The Gift
- Inaugural Winner 2016 of Mona Brand Award, awarded by the State Library of New South Wales in recognition of "an outstanding Australian woman writing for the stage or screen".
- Lifetime Achievement Award 2019, University of Melbourne Faculty of Arts
- Patrick White Playwrights' Fellowship 2024, Sydney Theatre Company
- Member of the Order of Australia 2025.
