= Chimerica (TV series) =

British television adaptation of Lucy Kirkwood's play

- Genre: Drama; Mystery
- Based on: Chimerica by Lucy Kirkwood
- Written by: Lucy Kirkwood
- Directed by: Michael Keillor
- Country of origin: United Kingdom
- Original language: English
- No. of series: 1
- No. of episodes: 4

Production
- Executive producers: Colin Callender; Sophie Gardiner; Adrian Sturges
- Running time: 56 minutes
- Production company: Playground Entertainment

Original release
- Network: Channel 4
- Release: 17 April – 8 May 2019

Chimerica is a four-part British drama that aired in April 2019 on Channel 4. It was based on the play of the same name by Lucy Kirkwood.

== Plot ==
A young photojournalist captures a photo of the Tank Man in Beijing during the 1989 Tiananmen Square protests and massacre. Twenty years later, he goes on a journey to discover the man's true identity.

== Cast ==
- Alessandro Nivola as Lee Berger
- Cherry Jones as Mel Kincaid
- Sophie Okonedo as Tessa Kendrick
- F. Murray Abraham as Frank Sams
- Terry Chen as Zhang Lin
- Katie Leung as Liuli
- Vera Chok as Shen

== Episodes list ==
| No. | Title | Directed by | Written by | Original release date | U.K viewers (millions) |
|---|---|---|---|---|---|
| 1 | "Kodak Ergo Sum" | Michael Keillor | Lucy Kirkwood | 17 April 2019 | N/A |
| 2 | "Gray Areas" | Michael Keillor | Lucy Kirkwood | 24 April 2019 | N/A |
| 3 | "The Brace Position" | Michael Keillor | Lucy Kirkwood | 1 May 2019 | N/A |
| 4 | "Neither East nor West" | Michael Keillor | Lucy Kirkwood | 8 May 2019 | N/A |

== See also ==
- Tank Man § Legacy
