= Chimerica (play) =

2013 play by Lucy Kirkwood

- Original language: English
- Written by: Lucy Kirkwood

Premiere
- Date: May 20, 2013

Chimerica is a 2013 play by the British dramatist Lucy Kirkwood. It draws its title from the term Chimerica, referring to the predominance of China and America in modern geopolitics. The play premiered in London at the Almeida Theatre and was directed by Lyndsey Turner. Turner's production received several awards and was well-reviewed. A Channel 4 four-part drama of the same name based on the play was released in 2019.

== Development ==
Playwright Lucy Kirkwood was commissioned to write the play that would become Chimerica in 2006, seven years before it eventually premiered.

The title of the play comes from the portmanteau Chimerica, coined by Niall Ferguson and Moritz Schularick, referring to the significance of the sociopolitical relationship between China and America, especially in the global economy. Kirkwood has also cited the similarity in sound between 'Chimerica' and the word 'chimera' as a reason for the title.

== Synopsis ==
Chimerica follows photojournalist Joe Schofield, who photographed the unidentified Tank Man during the 1989 Tiananmen Square protests and massacre. Twenty years later, Chinese dissident and ESL teacher Zhang Lin, who was present during the 1989 pro-democracy protests and subsequent massacre, assists Joe in his quest to find Tank Man. Zhang Lin's fiancée, Liuli, died in the protests and flashback scenes between Liuli and Zhang Lin appear throughout the play. Joe's journalist colleagues recommend that Joe not pursue the Tank Man. After Joe returns to America, where Lin suggests the Tank Man is living, Zhang Lin is tortured by the Chinese authorities. Joe develops a relationship with Englishwoman, Tessa, who is profiling the Chinese population so that her employer can have an advantage in China. At the end of the play, it is revealed that Zhang Lin was the Tank Man.

== Characters ==
- Joe Schofield, an American photojournalist
- Frank Hadley, Joe's editor
- Mel Stanwick, a journalist
- Tessa Kendrick, a market analyst
- Zhang Lin, an ESL teacher and Joe's primary contact in China
- Liuli, Zhang Lin's former fiancée, killed during Tiananmen Square protests
- Benny, Zhang Lin's nephew
- Zhang Wei, Zhang Lin's brother, Benny's assistant
- Paul Kramer, in 1989 was the Beijing correspondent for The Herald
- Feng Meihui, a Chinese businesswoman living in New York
- Jennifer Lee, Feng Meihui's daughter
- Maria Dubiecki, a senator
- David Barker, Maria's assistant
- Mary Chang, a Chinese woman living in New York
- Ming Xiaoli, Zhang Lin's neighbour
- Doreen, Frank's assistant
- Michelle, an Asian-American police officer
- Officer Hyte, Michelle's partner
- Herb, an American tourist, married to Barb
- Barb, an American tourist, married to Herb
- Kate, a British reporter at Tiananmen Square
- Deng, a young Chinese businesswoman
- Peter Rourke, an American CEO of a company with an office in Beijing
- Dawn, Peter's secretary
- Judy, a lawyer for Peter's company
- Pengsi, a Chinese man living in New York
- Pengsi's Wife
- Guard
- Nurse
- Woman in Strip Club
- Drug Dealer

== Production history ==
=== Premiere ===
Chimerica premiered at the Almeida Theatre, London from 20 May 2013 to 6 July 2013, in a production co-produced with Headlong before transferring to the Harold Pinter Theatre. The production was directed by Lyndsey Turner with stage design by Es Devlin.

==== Premiere cast ====
Actor	Character(s)
Claudie Blakley	Tessa Kendrick
Stephen Campbell Moore	Joe Schofield
Elizabeth Chan	Liuli/Jennifer
Vera Chok / Wendy Kweh	Michelle/Mary Chang/Deng
Karl Collins	David Barker/Peter Rourke/Paul Kramer/Officer Hyte
Trevor Cooper	Frank/Herb/Drug Dealer
Nancy Crane	Doreen/Maria Dubiecki/Judy
Sean Gilder	Mel Stanwick
Sarah Lam	Feng Meihui/Ming Xiaoli
Andrew Leung	Young Zhang Lin/Benny
David K S Tse	Zhang Wei/Wang Pengsi
Benedict Wong	Zhang Lin
Rosie Armstrong	Ensemble/Understudy for Tessa Kendrick, Doreen, Maria Dubiecki, Judy
Tina Chiang	Ensemble/Understudy for Liuli, Jennifer, Michelle, Mary Chang, Deng, Feng Meihui, Ming Xiaoli
Christopher Hollinshead	Ensemble/Understudy for Joe Schofield
Math Sams	Ensemble/Understudy for David Barker, Peter Rourke, Paul Kramer, Officer Hyte, Frank, Herb, Drug Dealer, Mel Stanwick
Kevin Shen	Ensemble/Understudy for Zhang Lin, Young Zhang Lin, Benny, Zhang Wei, Wang Pengsi

=== Subsequent productions ===
In September 2015, Chimerica was performed for the first time in the United States. The production was directed by David Muse at Studio Theatre in Washington, D.C., Rob Yang played Zhang Lin opposite Ron Menzel's Joe Schofield.

Chimerica made its Canadian premiere at the Royal Manitoba Theatre Centre in 2016. The production was directed by Chris Abraham and starred Evan Buliung as Joe and Paul Sun-Hyung Lee as Zhang Lin. Filmmaker Deco Dawson provided video which was projected during the performance. This production was co-produced by the Royal Manitoba Theatre Centre and by Toronto's Canadian Stage. After playing in Winnipeg from February till mid-March, the production travelled to Toronto and played from the end of March to mid-April.

Later in 2016, Chimerica played in Chicago at TimeLine Theatre under the direction of Nick Bowling.

Chimerica premiered in Australia in March 2017. Kip Williams directed the Sydney Theatre Company production at the Roslyn Packer Theatre. The production starred Mark Leonard Winter as Joe and Jason Chong as Zhang Lin among the cast of 32 actors.

In February and March 2022, the Crane Creations Theatre Company led a play reading of Chimerica on its Play Date. This play reading is meant to spread awareness and increase appreciation of playwrights and playwriting from around the world and to global audiences.

A French adaptation of Chimerica premiered in Montreal in January 2024 at the Jean-Duceppe Theatre of Place des Arts.

=== Adaptations ===
In 2019, Channel 4 released a four-part drama called Chimerica inspired by the play. The adaptation was penned by Lucy Kirkwood who made several changes from the original script including changing the setting from 2012 to 2016. The main character in the series is called Lee Berger and is played by Alessandro Nivola.

== Reception ==
The play as a whole has been criticized for its ambitious runtime of over three hours.

The Almeida production was described in one review as "fluent and seductive", with a "filmic quality", with the multiple set changes well-handled. The premiere was well received and garnered many awards.

In September 2019, The Guardian writers listed it as the 10th best theatre show since 2000.

=== Awards ===
Year	Award	Category	Result	Notes	Ref.
2013	Evening Standard Awards	Best Play	Won		
2014	Olivier Awards	Best New Play	Won		
2014	Olivier Awards	Best Director	Won	for Lyndsey Turner	
2014	Olivier Awards	Best Lighting Design	Won	for Tim Lutkin and Finn Ross	
2014	Olivier Awards	Best Sound Design	Won	for Carolyn Downing	
2014	Olivier Awards	Best Set Design	Won	for Es Devlin	
2014	Susan Smith Blackburn Prize		Won	for Lucy Kirkwood	

== See also ==
- Tank Man § Legacy
