= Melbourne Theatre Company =

Theatre company in Melbourne, Australia

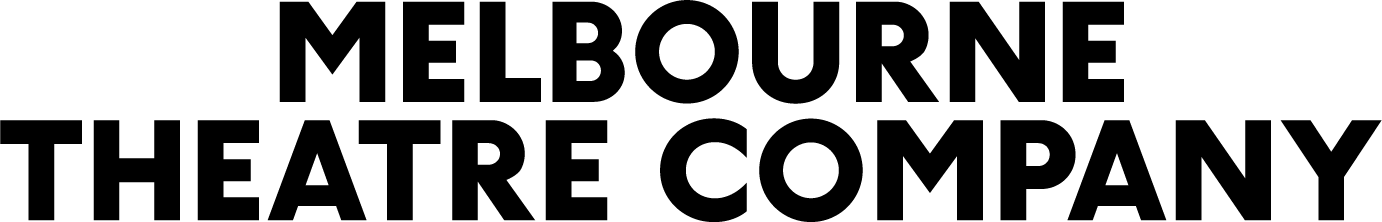
- Industry: Theatre
- Founded: 1953; 73 years ago, as Union Theatre Repertory Company
- Founder: John Sumner
- Headquarters: Melbourne, Australia
- Products: Theatrical productions
- Website: www.mtc.com.au

The Melbourne Theatre Company is a theatre company based in Melbourne, Victoria, Australia. Founded in 1953 as the Union Theatre Repertory Company at the Union Theatre at the University of Melbourne, it is the oldest professional theatre company in Australia.

The company's Southbank Theatre houses the 500-seat Sumner and the 150-seat Lawler, and the company also performs in the Arts Centre Melbourne's Fairfax Studio and Playhouse, all located in Melbourne's Arts Precinct in Southbank. Considered Victoria's state theatre company, it formally comes under the auspices of the University of Melbourne. As of 2013 it offered a Mainstage Season of ten to twelve plays each year, as well as education, family and creative development activities, and reported having a subscriber base of approximately 20,000 people and played to around a quarter of a million people annually.

== History ==
The Melbourne Theatre Company was founded in 1953 by John Sumner as the Union Theatre Repertory Company, based at the Union Theatre of the University of Melbourne's Student Union building. Sumner's original idea was to present a season of plays over those months when the Union Theatre was not being used by student drama societies. It was Australia's first professional repertory theatre, presenting a new play every two weeks during the season. Later, that became three weekly repertory. The first play, Jean Anouilh's Colombe, opened on 31 August 1953, starring Zoe Caldwell (who was later to have considerable success on Broadway), George Fairfax and Alex Scott.

Over the years, Melbourne Theatre Company has championed Australian writing, introducing the works of writers such as Alan Seymour, Vance Palmer, Patrick White, Alan Hopgood, Alexander Buzo, David Williamson, John Romeril, Jim McNeil, Alma De Groen, John Powers, Matt Cameron, Ron Elisha, Justin Fleming, Janis Bolodis, Hannie Rayson, Louis Nowra, Michael Gurr, Jack Davis, Michael Gow and Joanna Murray-Smith (to mention only a few) to mainstream Melbourne audiences. The first Australian play produced by the company, Summer of the Seventeenth Doll by Ray Lawler, in 1955 was quickly recognised as an Australian classic.

Lawler had by that time succeeded Sumner as Director of the company, taking it through the 1955 and 1956 seasons. When Lawler left to perform The Doll in London, he handed the directorship to Wal Cherry, who oversaw the company from 1956 until 1959. Cherry's experimental and daring approach to theatre did much to broaden the tastes of Melbourne theatre-goers, though the company suffered at the box-office. In 1959, John Sumner returned and subsequently steered the company through twenty-eight years of growth, watching it become, by the time he retired in 1987, the largest theatre company in Australia. Since then the company has had three artistic directors: Roger Hodgman (1987–1999), who steered MTC through the financially troublesome period of the late 1980s and 1990s; Simon Phillips, who was Artistic Director from 2000 to 2011; and Brett Sheehy from 2012. Robyn Nevin, Pamela Rabe, and Aidan Fennessy managed the 2012 season in the interim between Phillips and Sheehy.

Fennessy was Associate Director for some time.

The Melbourne Theatre Company has performed in many Melbourne venues in its history, including the Russell Street Theatre, the Melbourne Athenaeum, St Martins Theatre, the Merlyn and Beckett Theatres at the Malthouse, the Playhouse and Fairfax Studio of the Arts Centre Melbourne, the Comedy Theatre and the Princess Theatre.

== Directors ==
=== Artistic directors ===
- 1953–1955 John Sumner
- 1955–1956 Ray Lawler
- 1956–1959 Wal Cherry
- 1959–1987 John Sumner
- 1987–1999 Roger Hodgman
- 2000–2011 Simon Phillips
- 2012 Robyn Nevin, Pamela Rabe, Aidan Fennessy
- 2013–2022 Brett Sheehy
- 2023– Anne-Louise Sarks

=== Associate directors ===
Petra Kalive was appointed associate director in 2020. In November 2024, she left to take up the appointment of artistic director of the State Theatre Company South Australia.

== Awards and nominations ==
=== Helpmann Awards ===
The Helpmann Awards is an awards show, celebrating live entertainment and performing arts in Australia, presented by industry group Live Performance Australia since 2001. Note: 2020 and 2021 were cancelled due to the COVID-19 pandemic.

Year	Nominee / work	Award	Result	Ref.
2001	Life After George (Melbourne Theatre Company)	Helpmann Award for Best Play	Won	
2001	Art (Melbourne Theatre Company)	Helpmann Award for Best Play	Nominated	
2001	Simon Phillips – Measure for Measure (Melbourne Theatre Company)	Helpmann Award for Best Direction of a Play	Nominated	
2001	Caroline O'Conner – Piaf (Melbourne Theatre Company)	Helpmann Award for Best Female Actor in a Play	Won	
2001	John Gaden – The Unexpected Man (Company B Belvoir and Melbourne Theatre Company)	Helpmann Award for Best Male Actor in a Play	Won	
2001	Company (Melbourne Theatre Company)	Helpmann Award for Best Musical	Nominated	
2001	Dale Ferguson – Trelawny of the 'Wells' (Melbourne Theatre Company)	Helpmann Award for Best Costume Design	Nominated	
2002	The Tempest (Melbourne Theatre Company)	Best Play	Nominated	
2002	Caroline O'Connor - Bombshells (Melbourne Theatre Company)	Best Female Actor in a Play	Nominated	
2002	Dale Ferguson – The Seagull (Melbourne Theatre Company)	Best Scenic Design	Nominated	
2003	Simon Phillips – The Blue Room (Melbourne Theatre Company)	Best Direction of a Play	Nominated	
2003	Simon Phillips – Great Expectations	Best Direction of a Play	Nominated	
2003	Rachael Griffiths - Proof (Melbourne Theatre Company)	Best Female Actor in a Play	Won	
2003	Christopher Gabardi – Cloud Nine (Melbourne Theatre Company)	Helpmann Award for Best Male Actor in a Supporting Role in a Play	Nominated	
2004	Inheritance	Best Play	Won	
2004	Frozen	Best Play	Nominated	
2004	Julian Meyrick – Frozen (Melbourne Theatre Company)	Best Direction of a Play	Nominated	
2004	Helen Morse – Frozen (Melbourne Theatre Company)	Best Female Actor in a Play	Nominated	
2004	Frank Gallacher – Frozen (Melbourne Theatre Company)	Best Male Actor in a Play	Nominated	
2004	Belinda McClory – Frozen (Melbourne Theatre Company)	Best Female Actor in a Supporting Role in a Play	Won	
2005	The Sapphires	Best Play	Won	
2005	Pamela Rabe – Dinner (Melbourne Theatre Company)	Best Female Actor in a Play	Nominated	
2005	Richard Piper – The Daylight Atheist (Melbourne Theatre Company)	Best Male Actor in a Play	Nominated	
2005	Urinetown, the Musical (Melbourne Theatre Company)	Helpmann Award for Best Musical	Nominated	
2005	Ros Horin – Through the Wire (Performing Lines in association with Melbourne Theatre Company)	Helpmann Award for Best New Australian Work	Nominated	
2006	Simon Phillips – King Lear (Melbourne Theatre Company)	Best Direction in a Play	Nominated	
2006	Hamish Michael – Two Brothers (Melbourne Theatre Company & Sydney Theatre Company)	Best Male Actor in a Supporting Role in a Play	Nominated	
2006	The 25th Annual Putnam County Spelling Bee (Melbourne Theatre Company)	Best Musical	Won	
2007	Jefferson Mays – I Am My Own Wife (Melbourne Theatre Company, Sydney Theatre Company and Hothouse Theatre)	Best Male Actor in a Play	Won	
2007	Matthew Newton – The History Boys (Melbourne Theatre Company)	Best Male Actor in a Supporting Role in a Play	Nominated	
2007	Dan Wyllie – The Pillowman (Melbourne Theatre Company)	Best Male Actor in a Supporting Role in a Play	Nominated	
2008	Geneviève Picot – Rock n Roll (Melbourne Theatre Company)	Best Female Actor in a Play	Nominated	
2008	Alison Whyte – Don's Party (Melbourne Theatre Company and Sydney Theatre Company)	Best Female Actor in a Supporting Role in a Play	Nominated	
2008	Travis McMahon – Don's Party (Melbourne Theatre Company and Sydney Theatre Company)	Best Male Actor in a Supporting Role in a Play	Nominated	
2009	Peter Evans – Blackbird (Melbourne Theatre Company)	Best Direction of a Play	Nominated	
2009	Grant Piro – Realism (Melbourne Theatre Company)	Best Male Actor in a Supporting Role in a Play	Nominated	
2010	Richard III (Melbourne Theatre Company)	Best Play	Won	
2010	August: Osage County (Melbourne Theatre Company)	Best Play	Nominated	
2010	Jane Menelaus – August: Osage County (Melbourne Theatre Company)	Best Female in a Play	Nominated	
2010	Robyn Nevin – August: Osage County (Melbourne Theatre Company)	Best Female in a Play	Nominated	
2010	The Drowsy Chaperone	Best Musical	Nominated	
2012	The Importance of Being Earnest (Melbourne Theatre Company)	Best Play	Nominated	
2012	Simon Phillips – Songs for Nobodies (Melbourne Theatre Company in association with Duet)	Best Direction of a Play	Nominated	
2012	Colin Friels – Red (Melbourne Theatre Company)	Best Male Actor in a Play	Nominated	
2012	Bob Hornery – The Importance of Being Earnest (Melbourne Theatre Company)	Best Male Actor in a Supporting Role in a Play	Won	
2012	Patrick Brammall – Clybourne Park (Melbourne Theatre Company)	Best Male Actor in a Supporting Role in a Play	Nominated	
2013	Alison Bell – Constellations (Melbourne Theatre Company)	Best Female Actor in a Play	Nominated	
2013	Valerie Bader – Australia Day (Sydney Theatre Company and Melbourne Theatre Company)	Best Female Actor in a Supporting Role in a Play	Nominated	
2014	Zahra Newman – The Mountaintop (Melbourne Theatre Company)	Best Female Actor in a Play	Nominated	
2014	Tom Budge – The Beast (Melbourne Theatre Company)	Best Male Actor in a Supporting Role in a Play	Nominated	
2015	Clare Watson – What Rhymes with Cars and Girls (Melbourne Theatre Company)	Best Direction of a Play	Nominated	
2015	Julie Forsyth – Endgame (Melbourne Theatre Company)	Best Female Actor in a Supporting Role in a Play	Nominated	
2015	Damien Millar – Marlin (Arena Theatre Company and Melbourne Theatre Company)	Best New Australian Work	Nominated	
2016	North by Northwest (Melbourne Theatre Company and Kay + McLean Productions)	Best Play	Nominated	
2016	Mark Leonard Winter – Birdland (Melbourne Theatre Company)	Best Male Actor in a Play	Won	
2016	Katrina Milosevic – The Distance (Melbourne Theatre Company)	Best Female Actor in a Supporting Role in a Play	Nominated	
2017	Jasper Jones (Melbourne Theatre Company)	Best Play	Nominated	
2017	Helen Morse – John (Melbourne Theatre Company)	Best Female Actor in a Play	Nominated	
2018	The Children – (Melbourne Theatre Company and Sydney Theatre Company)	Best Play	Won	
2018	Sarah Goodes - The Children – (Melbourne Theatre Company and Sydney Theatre Company)	Best Direction	Won	
2018	Pamela Rabe – The Children – (Melbourne Theatre Company and Sydney Theatre Company)	Best Female Actor in a Play	Won	
2018	Sarah Peirse – The Children – (Melbourne Theatre Company and Sydney Theatre Company)	Best Female Actor in a Play	Nominated	
2018	John Bell – The Father (Sydney Theatre Company and Melbourne Theatre Company)	Best Male Actor in a Play	Nominated	
2018	Jane Montgomery-Griffiths – Macbeth (Melbourne Theatre Company)	Best Female Actor in a Supporting Role in a Play	Nominated	
2018	Bunny Christie – The Curious Incident of the Dog in the Night-Time (National Theatre, Melbourne Theatre Company and Arts Centre Melbourne)	Best Scenic Design	Nominated	
2019	Melita Jurisic – Arbus & West (Melbourne Theatre Company)	Best Female Actor in a Play	Nominated	
2019	Zoe Terakes – A View from the Bridge (Melbourne Theatre Company)	Best Female Actor in a Supporting Role in a Play	Nominated	
2019	Kate Miller-Heidke & Keir Nuttall – Twelfth Night (Melbourne Theatre Company)	Helpmann Award for Best Original Score	Nominated	

== Bibliography ==
- Geoffrey Hutton (1975). "It won't last a week!": the first twenty years of the Melbourne Theatre Company. Melbourne: Macmillan. ISBN 0-333-17506-9.
- Julian Meyrick, ed. (2004). The Drama Continues: MTC the first fifty years 1953–2003. Southbank: Melbourne Theatre Company. ISBN 0-9751712-0-8.
