= Chimerica =

Term describing economic relations between China and the United States

Chimerica is a neologism and portmanteau coined by Niall Ferguson and Moritz Schularick describing the symbiotic relationship between China and the United States, with incidental reference to the legendary chimera. Although the term is largely in reference to economics, there is also a political element.

== Origin ==
Historian Niall Ferguson and economist Moritz Schularick first coined the term in late 2006, arguing that saving by the Chinese and overspending by Americans led to an incredible period of wealth creation that contributed to the 2008 financial crisis. For years, China accumulated large currency reserves and channeled them into US government securities, which kept nominal and real long-term interest rates artificially low in the United States. Ferguson describes Chimerica as one economy which "accounts for around 13 percent of the world's land surface, a quarter of its population, about a third of its gross domestic product, and somewhere over half of the global economic growth of the past six years." He suggests Chimerica could end if China were to decouple from the United States bringing with it a shift in global power and allowing China "to explore other spheres of global influence, from the Shanghai Cooperation Organisation, of which Russia is also a member, to its own informal nascent empire in commodity-rich Africa."

The accumulation of American debt, which has been estimated at over $800 billion, suggests the two nations are intrinsically linked; the economic symbiosis prevalent between the two suggests that separation would harm both countries and be disastrous for the global economy. Another way to measure this integration is the trade deficit. The US trade deficit with China was $295 billion in 2011, meaning the US imported that much more goods and services from China than it exported to China. The Economic Policy Institute estimated that from 2001 to 2011, 2.7 million US jobs were lost to China. The concept of Chimerica supplements and/or supplants Nichibei, or the similarly constructed Japan-U.S. economic model and relationship that had been prominent in years before the development of Chimerica. The idea of Chimerica features prominently in Ferguson's 2008 book and adapted television documentary The Ascent of Money, which reviews the history of money, credit, and banking.

== See also ==
- Alan M. Taylor's collaboration with Moritz Schularick
- Becoming Chinese
- Bretton Woods II
- Chindia
- Global saving glut
- Group of Two
- Moritz Schularick on German Wikipedia
- Pacific Century
- Sino-American relations
- Chimerica, the play
