= 16th Helpmann Awards =

2016 theatre awards in Australia

- Date: 25 July 2016
- Location: Sydney Lyric Theatre
- Website: http://www.helpmannawards.com.au/

Television/radio coverage
- Network: Foxtel Arts

The 16th Annual Helpmann Awards for live performance in Australia were held on 25 July 2016 at the Sydney Lyric Theatre.

The Australian production of Matilda the Musical received thirteen awards including every award for musicals. Griffin Theatre Company's drama The Bleeding Tree received three awards including Best Play. Brisbane Baroque's production of Handel's Agrippina received four awards including Best Opera, and Bangarra Dance Theatre's Sheoak received three awards including Best Ballet or Dance Work. New musical Ladies in Black was named Best New Australian Work.

== Winners and nominees ==
In the following tables, winners are listed first and highlighted in boldface. The nominees are listed below the winner and not in boldface.

=== Theatre ===
Best Play
**The Bleeding Tree – Griffin Theatre Company**; North by Northwest – Melbourne Theatre Company and Kay + McLean Productions by special arrangement with Warner Bros. Theatre Ventures; Piece for Person and Ghetto Blaster – Performing Lines and Nicola Gunn; Prize Fighter – La Boite Theatre Company and Brisbane Festival
Best Direction of a Play
**Lee Lewis – The Bleeding Tree**; Eamon Flack – Ivanov (Belvoir); Simon Phillips – North by Northwest; Kip Williams – Love and Information (Sydney Theatre Company and Malthouse Theatre)
Best Female Actor in a Play	Best Male Actor in a Play
**Paula Arundell – The Bleeding Tree**; Cate Blanchett – The Present (Sydney Theatre Company); Noni Hazlehurst – Mother (If Theatre); Catherine McClements – The Events (Belvoir, Malthouse and State Theatre Company of South Australia)	**Mark Leonard Winter – Birdland (Melbourne Theatre Company)**; Pacharo Mzembe – Prize Fighter; Richard Roxburgh – The Present; Dan Spielman – The Blind Giant is Dancing (Belvoir)
Best Female Actor in a Supporting Role in a Play	Best Male Actor in a Supporting Role in a Play
**Sarah Peirse – The Golden Age (Sydney Theatre Company)**; Michelle Doake – Romeo and Juliet (Bell Shakespeare); Katrina Milosevic – The Distance (Melbourne Theatre Company); Anna Samson – Birdland	**Mark Leonard Winter – King Lear (Sydney Theatre Company)**; Colin Friels – Mortido (Belvoir and State Theatre Company of South Australia); John Howard – Ivanov; Thuso Lekwape – Prize Fighter

=== Musicals ===
Best Musical
**Matilda the Musical – The Royal Shakespeare Company and Louise Withers, Michael Coppel and Michael Watt with Chokey Productions, Just for Laughs Theatricals, Glass Half Full Productions, Paula Marie Black, Greenleaf Productions and Michael Lynch**; Fiddler on the Roof – Tim Lawson for TML Enterprises; Ladies in Black – Queensland Theatre Company; The Sound of Music – Andrew Lloyd Webber, David Ian, John Frost and The Really Useful Group
Best Direction of a Musical	Best Choreography in a Musical
**Matthew Warchus – Matilda the Musical**; Dean Bryant – Little Shop of Horrors (Luckiest Productions and Tinderbox Productions); Roger Hodgman – Fiddler on the Roof; Simon Phillips – Ladies in Black	**Peter Darling – Matilda the Musical**; Andrew Hallsworth – Little Shop of Horrors; Arlene Phillips – The Sound of Music; Andrew Wright – Singin' in the Rain (Lunchbox Theatrical Productions, Michael Cassel Group, David Atkins Enterprises and Dainty Group)
Best Female Actor in a Musical	Best Male Actor in a Musical
**Molly Barwick, Dusty Bursill, Tiana Mirra, Alannah Parfett, Sasha Rose, Georgia Taplin, Bella Thomas and Ingrid Torelli – Matilda the Musical**; Antoinette Halloran – Sweeney Todd (Victorian Opera and New Zealand Opera); Esther Hannaford – Little Shop of Horrors; Amy Lehpamer – The Sound of Music	**James Millar – Matilda the Musical**; Brent Hill – Little Shop of Horrors; Rob Mills – Ghost the Musical (Ambassador Theatre Group Asia Pacific, GWB Entertainment and Red Live); Anthony Warlow – Fiddler on the Roof
Best Female Actor in a Supporting Role in a Musical	Best Male Actor in a Supporting Role in a Musical
**Elise McCann – Matilda the Musical**; Wendy Mae Brown – Ghost the Musical; Jacqueline Dark – The Sound of Music; Erika Heynatz – Singin' in the Rain	**Daniel Frederiksen – Matilda the Musical**; Jack Chambers – Singin' in the Rain; Tyler Coppin – Little Shop of Horrors; Simon Gallaher – Wicked (Marc Platt, David Stone, Universal Pictures, The Araca Group, Jon B. Platt, John Frost)

=== Opera and classical music ===
Best Opera	Best Direction of an Opera
**Agrippina – Brisbane Baroque in association with QPAC**; Fly Away Peter – Arts Centre Melbourne and Sydney Chamber Opera in association with Melbourne Festival; Luisa Miller – Opera Australia; The Marriage of Figaro – Opera Australia	**David McVicar – The Marriage of Figaro**; Laurence Dale – Agrippina; Michael Gow – Voyage to the Moon (Victorian Opera, Musica Viva and the ARC Centre of Excellence for the History of Emotions); Cameron Menzies – The Grumpiest Boy in the World (Victorian Opera)
Best Female Performer in an Opera	Best Male Performer in an Opera
**Nicole Car – Luisa Miller**; Latonia Moore – Don Carlos (Opera Australia); Jessica Pratt – Lucia di Lammermoor (Victorian Opera); Ulrike Schneider – Agrippina	**Carlo Vistoli – Agrippina**; Andrei Bondarenko – The Marriage of Figaro; Ferruccio Furlanetto – Don Carlos; Yonghoon Lee – Turandot (Sydney Winter) (Opera Australia)
Best Female Performer in a Supporting Role in an Opera	Best Male Performer in a Supporting Role in an Opera
**Keri Fuge – Agrippina**; Sally-Anne Russell – Voyage to the Moon	**João Fernandes – Agrippina**; Russell Harcourt – Agrippina; Jeremy Kleeman – Voyage to the Moon; Douglas McNicol – Don Giovanni (State Opera of South Australia)
Best Symphony Orchestra Concert	Best Chamber and/or Instrumental Ensemble Concert
**Sir Simon Rattle Conducts the Australian World Orchestra – Australian World Orchestra**; Anima Eterna Brugge Beethoven's Symphonies conducted by Jos Van Immerseel – Sydney Festival; Beethoven's Missa Solemnis – Sydney Symphony Orchestra; Britten's War Requiem – Melbourne Symphony Orchestra	**French Baroque with Circa – Australian Brandenburg Orchestra**; Home – Camerata of St John's; Kirill Gerstein in Recital – Sydney Symphony Orchestra; Winterreise – Festival d'Aix-en-Provence
Best Individual Classical Performance
**Pierre-Laurent Aimard – Pierre-Laurent Aimard (Melbourne Recital Centre and Sydney Symphony Orchestra)**; Florian Boesch and Malcolm Martineau – Florian Boesch and Malcolm Martineau (Melbourne Recital Centre and Sydney Opera House); Renée Fleming – Renée Fleming in Recital (Sydney Opera House, QPAC and Brisbane Festival in association with Opera Queensland); Andrew Haveron – Sibelius 2 (Sydney Symphony Orchestra); Gil Shaham – Tchaikovsky's Manfred (Sydney Symphony Orchestra)

=== Dance and physical theatre ===
Best Ballet or Dance Work	Best Visual or Physical Theatre Production
**Sheoak – Bangarra Dance Theatre**; Cockfight – Performing Lines and The Farm; Habitus – Australian Dance Theatre; Spectra – Dancenorth	**Il Ritorno – Brisbane Festival and Circa**; Plexus – Compagnie 111–Aurélien Bory and Perth International Arts Festival; Tangi Wai... The Cry of Water – Victoria Hunt, Artful Management and Performance Space; The Last Blast – The Farm and Bleach* Festival
Best Choreography in a Dance or Physical Theatre Work
**Frances Rings – Sheoak**; Kyle Page and Amber Haines – Spectra; Stephen Page, Bernadette Walong-Sene, Djakapurra Munyarryun – Ochres (Bangarra Dance Theatre); Garry Stewart and Larissa McGowan – Habitus
Best Female Dancer in a Dance or Physical Theatre Work	Best Male Dancer in a Dance or Physical Theatre Work
**Yolanda Lowatta – Sheoak**; Juliette Barton – Lux Tenebris (Sydney Dance Company); Lonii Garnons-Williams – Habitus; Amber Haines – Syncing Feeling (Dancenorth)	**Kimball Wong – Habitus**; Chengwu Guo – The Dream (The Australian Ballet); Daryl Brandwood – Natalie Weir's The Host (Expressions Dance Company and QPAC); Gavin Webber – Cockfight

=== Contemporary music ===
Best Australian Contemporary Concert	Best Contemporary Music Festival
**MOFO 2016 Kate Miller-Heidke and the Tasmanian Symphony Orchestra with visuals by Amy Gebhardt – MOFO 2016**; A State of Grace: The Music of Tim and Jeff Buckley – Gaynor Crawford Presents, Kirsten Siddle, State of Grace Company; Flight Facilities Perform Live with Melbourne Symphony Orchestra – Flight Facilities with Melbourne Symphony Orchestra, Melbourne Festival; Vance Joy – Fire and Flood Tour April 2016 – Vance Joy, Frontier Touring, Unified and Village Sounds	**WOMADelaide 2016 – The World's Festival – Womadelaide Foundation**; The 27th Annual Byron Bay Bluesfest – Bluesfest; MOFO 2016 – MONA; St Jerome's Laneway Festival 2016 – Laneway Presents and Chugg Entertainment
Best International Contemporary Music Concert
**Prince 'Piano & a Microphone Tour' 2016 – Prince, Dainty Group and ICO ApS**; Brian Wilson Live at the Palais Theatre – Brian Wilson and Bluesfest Touring; Florence and the Machine – Florence and The Machine, Laneway Presents, Chugg Entertainment in association with Sydney Opera House; On With the Show Tour 2015 – Fleetwood Mac and Live Nation

=== Other ===
Best Cabaret Performer	Best Comedy Performer
**Michael Griffiths – Cole (Adelaide Festival Centre's Adelaide Cabaret Festival)**; Michaela Burger and Greg Wain – Exposing Edith (Adelaide Festival Centre's Adelaide Cabaret Festival with I'll Wager Productions); Alan Cumming – Alan Cumming Sings Sappy Songs (Brisbane Powerhouse, NORPA, Arts Centre Melbourne and Sydney Festival with Hyam, Horne and Hall); Phil Scott – Reviewing The Situation (Tekule in association with Hayes Theatre Co)	**Tom Ballard – The World Keeps Happening (Token Events)**; Zoë Coombs Marr – Trigger Warning (Zoë Coombs Marr); Doug Anthony Allstars – Paul McDermott, Tim Ferguson, Paul Livingston – Reunion. Rebirth (Doug Anthony Allstars); Julia Morris – I Don't Want Your Honest Feedback (Live Nation)
Best Presentation for Children	Best Regional Touring Production
**Bambert's Book of Lost Stories – Barking Gecko Theatre Company**; Oddysea – Performing Lines WA and Sensorium Theatre; Roald Dahl's Revolting Rhymes & Dirty Beasts – shake & stir theatre co originally co-produced with La Boite Theatre Company; The Young King – Slingsby Theatre Company	**Sugarland – Australian Theatre for Young People and Performing Lines**; De Novo – Sydney Dance Company; Mother – If Theatre; Roald Dahl's Revolting Rhymes & Dirty Beats – shake & stir theatre co and arTour Queensland

=== Industry ===
Best New Australian Work
**Carolyn Burns and Tim Finn with Simon Phillips – Ladies in Black**; Future D. Fidel – Prize Fighter; Dan Giovannoni and Luke Kerridge – Bambert's Book of Lost Stories; Christopher Latham, Omar Faruk Tekbilek, Gareth Farr, Richard Nunns, Graeme Koehne AO, Peter Sculthorpe AO OBE, Elena Kats-Chernin, Kamran Ince, Ross Harris, Andrew Schultz, Ross Edwards and Demir Demirkan – The Gallipoli Symphony (Department of Veterans' Affairs, Queensland Government, QPAC and Qantas Airways); Frances Rings, Deborah Brown and Waangenga Blanco – lore (Bangarra Dance Theatre); Tom Wright – Picnic at Hanging Rock (Malthouse Theatre and Black Swan State Theatre Company)
Best Original Score	Best Music Direction
**Tim Minchin – Matilda the Musical**; Tim Finn – Ladies in Black; David Page – Ochres; Eddie Perfect – Songs From The Middle (Adelaide Festival Centre's Adelaide Cabaret Festival)	**Stephen Amos – Matilda the Musical**; Nicolette Fraillon – The Sleeping Beauty (The Australian Ballet); Iain Grandage, Lucky Oceans and Wayne Freer – Home (Perth International Arts Festival); Isaac Hayward – Ladies in Black
Best Scenic Design	Best Costume Design
**Rob Howell – Matilda the Musical**; Dan Potra – Handa on Sydney Harbour – Turandot (Opera Australia); Nick Schlieper and Simon Phillips – North by Northwest; Gabriela Tylesova – The Sleeping Beauty	**Rob Howell – Matilda the Musical**; Jenny Tiramani – The Marriage of Figaro; Gabriela Tylesova – Ladies in Black; Gabriela Tylesova – The Sleeping Beauty
Best Lighting Design	Best Sound Design
**Hugh Vanstone – Matilda the Musical**; Paul Jackson – Picnic at Hanging Rock; Nick Schlieper – North by Northwest; Hugh Vanstone – Ghost the Musical	**Simon Baker – Matilda the Musical**; Ian McDonald – North by Northwest; David Page – Ochres; Michael Waters – Fiddler on the Roof

=== Lifetime achievement ===
JC Williamson Award	Sue Nattrass Award
**Stephen Page**	**Michael Lynch**
