= Ladies in Black =

- Promotional image featuring Tim Finn (left) and Christen O'Leary (right)
- Music: Tim Finn
- Lyrics: Tim Finn
- Book: Carolyn Burns
- Setting: Sydney; 1950s
- Basis: Novel The Women in Black by Madeleine St John
- Productions: 2015 Brisbane/Melbourne; 2017 national tour
- Awards: Helpmann Award for Best New Australian Work

Ladies in Black is an Australian musical with music and lyrics by Tim Finn and book by Carolyn Burns, based on the 1993 novel The Women in Black by Madeleine St John.

== Synopsis ==
Set in Sydney in the 1950s, the musical tells the story of bookish school leaver Lisa who joins the sales staff in fashionable department store, F.G. Goode's. Over a summer that changes her life, she befriends the colourful denizens of the women's clothing department. Each of the characters is on the precipice of change – facing independence, working for a living and what it means to be a woman.

== Productions ==
Ladies in Black premiered in Brisbane in a season from 14 November to 6 December 2015 at the Playhouse, Queensland Performing Arts Centre, produced by the Queensland Theatre Company in association with the Queensland Performing Arts Centre. It transferred to Melbourne for the Melbourne Theatre Company, playing at The Sumner, Southbank Theatre from 16 January to 27 February 2016.

The production was directed by Simon Phillips with musical direction by Isaac Hayward, choreography by Andrew Hallsworth and orchestrations by Guy Simpson. The cast included Sarah Morrison (Lisa), Christen O'Leary (Magda), Bobby Fox (Rudi), Kathryn McIntyre (Myra/Dawn), Lucy Maunder (Patty), Naomi Price (Fay), Carita Farrer Spencer (Mrs Miles), Kate Cole (Miss Cartright/Joy), Andrew Broadbent (Frank), Deidre Rubenstein (Miss Jacobs/Mrs Crown) and Greg Stone (Mr Miles/Stefan).

Ladies in Black was remounted for a four-city engagement in 2017:

- Sydney from 3 January, at the Sydney Lyric
- Brisbane from 28 January, at the Playhouse, QPAC
- Melbourne from 25 February, at the Regent Theatre
- Canberra from 27 March, at the Canberra Theatre

== Critical reception ==
The musical was very positively received.

The Age called Ladies in Black "a unicorn of the stage: a full-blown, home-grown musical that actually works" and "probably the best Aussie musical since Priscilla went global". It wrote: "Tim Finn's songs range from Broadway-inspired big numbers to true-blue ballads, from witty patter songs to shades of blues and jazz standards. They're beautifully integrated with the dramatic action, and the comic lyrics are priceless."

The Australian stated that Finn "has approached Ladies in Black with such wholehearted sincerity and creative generosity ...creating an immensely engaging score filled with gorgeous melodies that make you care about the characters singing them."

ArtsHub indicated that "a comedy of mid-20th century manners, Ladies in Black is a paean to an optimistic future – the future of an uncomplicated gender equality and seamless multiculturalism. But Finn’s canny lyricism transports the play from its late 50s context to a subtle but salient comment on social issues of today."

== Awards and nominations ==
=== Helpmann Awards ===
Ladies in Black was nominated for six 2016 Helpmann Awards including Best Musical. It received the award for Best New Australian Work.

Year	Award	Category	Nominee	Result
2016	Helpmann Awards			
2016	Helpmann Awards	Best Musical	Queensland Theatre Company	Nominated
2016	Helpmann Awards	Best Direction of a Musical	Simon Phillips	Nominated
2016	Helpmann Awards	Best New Australian Work	Carolyn Burns and Tim Finn with Simon Phillips	Won
2016	Helpmann Awards	Best Original Score	Tim Finn	Nominated
2016	Helpmann Awards	Best Music Direction	Isaac Hayward	Nominated
2016	Helpmann Awards	Best Costume Design	Gabriela Tylesova	Nominated

=== Other ===
At the 2015 Matilda Awards for Brisbane theatre, Ladies in Black was nominated for Best Musical or Cabaret. Naomi Price received the award for Best Female Actor in a Supporting Role, and Sarah Morrison was nominated for Best Emerging Artist.

At the 2016 Green Room Awards for Melbourne music theatre, Ladies in Black received eight nominations, including Production (Queensland Theatre/MTC), Female Lead (Sarah Morrison), Female in a Supporting Role (both Christen O'Leary and Naomi Price), Male in a Supporting Role (Bobby Fox), Set Design (Gabriela Tylesova), Costume Design (Tylesova) and Lighting Design (David Walters).

At the 2017 Sydney Theatre Awards, Ladies in Black was nominated for Best Production of a Mainstage Musical.
