= Muriel's Wedding (musical) =

Australian stage musical

- Logo for the premiere production
- Music: Kate Miller-Heidke; Keir Nuttall; ABBA
- Lyrics: Kate Miller-Heidke; Keir Nuttall; ABBA
- Book: P. J. Hogan
- Basis: Muriel's Wedding by P. J. Hogan
- Premiere: 6 November 2017: Roslyn Packer Theatre, Sydney
- Productions: 2017 Sydney; 2019 Australian Tour; 2025 Leicester

Muriel's Wedding the Musical is an Australian stage musical based on P. J. Hogan's dramedy film of the same name. The musical has a book by Hogan and music and lyrics by Kate Miller-Heidke and Keir Nuttall, with additional songs originally written for ABBA by Benny Andersson, Björn Ulvaeus, and Stig Anderson.

== Productions ==
=== Sydney (2017–2018) ===
The original production began previews from 6 November 2017 with an official opening on 18 November 2017, and ran until 27 January 2018 at the Roslyn Packer Theatre in Sydney, produced by Sydney Theatre Company and Global Creatures. Simon Phillips directed, and Gabriela Tylesova designed the set and costumes. The 28-person cast included Max McKenna in the title role, Justine Clarke (Muriel's mother, Betty), Gary Sweet (Muriel's father, Bill Heslop), Madeleine Jones (Rhonda), Helen Dallimore (Deidre Chambers), Christie Whelan Browne (Tania Degano), Briallen Clarke (Joanie), Michael Whalley (Perry), Connor Sweeney (Malcolm), Ben Bennett (Brice Nobes) and Stephen Madsen (Alexander Shkuratov).

In 2017 it was announced that the Sydney production (and cast) were going to be transferring to Toronto's Ed Mirvish Theatre, in April 2018. However, the North American premiere was later postponed due to "scheduling conflicts", with producer David Mirvish planning to stage the show in a subsequent season.

=== Australian tour (2019) ===
The musical embarked national tour beginning 12 March 2019 at Her Majesty's Theatre in Melbourne. The production then opened at the Sydney Lyric Theatre on 28 June and was followed by the Queensland Performing Arts Centre in Brisbane from 19 September.

With McKenna performing in the Dear Evan Hansen US tour and Jones joining the Melbourne cast of Harry Potter and the Cursed Child, casting began in September 2018 for two new female leads. On 7 October it was announced that Natalie Abbott would be making her professional debut as Muriel alongside Elizabeth Esguerra as Rhonda. Days before opening, amidst several rumours it was announced that Esguerra had been removed from the production, with official releases stating "personal reasons", and she was replaced by her first understudy, Stefanie Jones.

=== Leicester (2025) ===
The musical had its UK premiere at the Curve, Leicester from 10 April to 10 May 2025 with Simon Phillips again directing, produced by Curve in association with Sydney Theatre Company. Casting included Megan Ellis as Muriel, Darren Day as Bill Heslop.

== Original casts ==
Character	Sydney	Australian tour	Leicester, U.K.
Character	2017	2019	2025
Muriel Heslop	Max McKenna	Natalie Abbott	Megan Ellis
Rhonda Epinstall	Madeleine Jones	Stefanie Jones	Annabel Marlow
Bill Heslop	Gary Sweet	David James	Darren Day
Betty Heslop	Justine Clarke	Pippa Grandison	Laura Medforth
Tania Degano	Christie Whelan Browne	Christie Whelan Browne	Helen Hill
Brice Nobes	Ben Bennett	Jarrod Griffiths	Ethan Pascal Peters
Alexander Shkuratov	Stephen Madsen	Stephen Madsen	Stephen Madsen
Ken Blundell	Dave Eastgate	Dave Eastgate	Chris Bennett
Agnetha Fältskog	Jaime Hadwen	Jaime Hadwen	Jasmine Hackett
Anni-Frid Lyngstad	Sheridan Harbridge	Laura Bunting	Bronte Alice-Tadman
Björn Ulvaeus	Mark Hill	Maxwell Simon	Jamie Doncaster
Benny Andersson	Aaron Tsindos	Evan Lever	Aaron Tsindos
Deidre Chambers	Helen Dallimore	Chelsea Plumley	Bronte Alice-Tadman
Janine Nuttall	Laura Murphy	Imogen Moore	Daisy Twells
Cheryl Moochmore	Manon Gunderson-Briggs	Catty Hamilton	Lillie-Pearl Wildman
Nicole Stumpf	Hilary Cole	Rachel Cole	Jasmine Beel
Joanie Heslop	Briallen Clarke	Manon Gunderson-Briggs	Lena Pattie Jones
Perry Heslop	Michael Whalley	Jacob Warner	Jacob Warner
Malcolm Heslop	Connor Sweeney	Caleb Vines	Joseph Peacock
Charlie Chan	Kenneth Moraleda	Kenneth Moraleda	
Peter "Chook" Vernell	Aaron Tsindos	Joshua Robson	

== Musical numbers ==
Act 1

- "Sunshine State of Mind" – Company
- "The Bouquet" – Muriel
- "Meet the Heslops" – Perry, Malcolm, Joanie and Betty
- "Dancing Queen"† / "The Bouquet" (reprise) – Muriel, Agnetha, Anni-Frid, Benny and Björn
- "Progress" – Bill, Deidre and Company
- "Can't Hang" – Tania, Cheryl, Nicole and Janine
- "Lucky Last/Perry Heslop" – Muriel and Perry
- "Money, Money, Money"† – Agnetha, Anni-Frid, Benny and Björn
- "People People" – Tania, Cheryl, Nicole and Janine
- "Girls Like Us" – Rhonda and Muriel
- "Waterloo"† – Rhonda, Muriel, Agnetha, Anni-Frid, Benny and Björn
- "Amazing" – Rhonda and Muriel
- "Sydney" – Company
- "Any Ordinary Night"^{[a]} – Company
- "Strangely Perfect Stranger" – Muriel and Brice
- "Here comes the Bride"^{[a]} – Company

Act 2

- "Never Stick your Neck out" - Brice and Male Company
- "Here Comes the Bride" – Company
- "A True Friend" – Muriel and Rhonda
- "Why Can't That Be Me?" – Muriel
- "True Friend" (reprise) / "Take a Chance on Ken" – Rhonda, Muriel, Agnetha, Anni-Frid, Benny and Björn
- "Life is a Competition" – Ken and Company
- "Mr and Mrs Shkuratov" – Muriel, Alexander, Ken and Company
- "Shared, Viral, Linked, Liked" – Tania, Cheryl, Nicole and Janine
- "I Do, I Do, I Do, I Do, I Do"† – Tania, Cheryl, Nicole, Muriel, Agnetha, Anni-Frid, Benny and Björn
- "The Bouquet" / "Can't Hang" (reprises) – Company
- "SOS"† – Agnetha, Anni-Frid, Benny and Björn
- "My Mother (Eulogy)" – Muriel, Perry, Malcolm, Joanie and Company
- "Strangely Perfect Stranger" (reprise) – Brice and Muriel
- "A True Friend" (reprise)^{[b]} – Company

All songs by Kate Miller-Heidke and Keir Nuttall, except as noted (†): "Dancing Queen", "Waterloo", "I Do, I Do, I Do, I Do, I Do" and "SOS" by Benny Andersson, Björn Ulvaeus and Stig Anderson; "Money, Money, Money" and "Super Trouper" by Benny Andersson and Björn Ulvaeus.

=== Original cast recording ===
Muriel's Wedding The Musical (The Original Cast Recording)

Cast recording by Various artists
- Released: 12 January 2018
- Studios: Sony Studios; Turning Studios; Sydney Theatre Company
- Length: 66:00
- Label: Sony Music Australia
- Producers: Carmen Pavlovic (exec.); Angela Dalton (exec.); Guy Simpson; Pip Norman

The original cast recording was released 12 January 2018 and debuted at #17 on the ARIA Albums Chart in Australia. At the ARIA Music Awards of 2018, the album was nominated for Best Original Soundtrack, Cast or Show Album.

No.	Title	Performer(s)	Length
1.	"Sunshine State of Mind"	The Cast of Muriel's Wedding The Musical	3:33
2.	"The Bouquet"	Maggie McKenna	2:14
3.	"Meet the Heslops"	Michael Whalley; Connor Sweeney; Briallen Clarke; Justine Clarke	2:19
4.	"Progress"	Gary Sweet; Helen Dallimore; The Cast of Muriel's Wedding The Musical	4:00
5.	"Can't Hang"	Christie Whelan Browne; Manon Gunderson-Briggs; Hilary Cole; Laura Murphy	3:18
6.	"Lucky Last / Perry Heslop"	Maggie McKenna; Michael Whalley	1:52
7.	"Girls Like Us"	Madeleine Jones; Maggie McKenna	1:35
8.	"Waterloo"	Madeleine Jones; Maggie McKenna; Sheridan Harbridge; Jaime Hadwen; Aaron Tsindos; Mark Hill	2:10
9.	"Amazing"	Madeleine Jones; Maggie McKenna	3:25
10.	"Sydney"	The Cast of Muriel's Wedding The Musical	2:54
11.	"Strangely Perfect Stranger"	Maggie McKenna; Ben Bennett	2:32
12.	"Here Comes the Bride"	The Cast of Muriel's Wedding The Musical	3:36
13.	"Never Stick Your Neck Out"	Ben Bennett; The Male Cast of Muriel's Wedding The Musical	3:13
14.	"Why Can't That Be Me?"	Maggie McKenna	2:36
15.	"Life Is a Competition"	Dave Eastgate; The Cast of Muriel's Wedding The Musical	3:42
16.	"Mr and Mrs Shkuratov"	Maggie McKenna; Stephen Madsen; Dave Eastgate; The Cast of Muriel's Wedding The Musical	5:44
17.	"Shared, Viral, Linked, Liked"	Christie Whelan Browne; Manon Gunderson-Briggs; Hilary Cole; Laura Murphy	1:55
18.	"SOS"	Jaime Hadwen; Sheridan Harbridge; Aaron Tsindos; Mark Hill	3:58
19.	"My Mother (Eulogy)"	Maggie McKenna; Michael Whalley; Connor Sweeney; Briallen Clarke; The Cast of Muriel's Wedding	4:54
20.	"A True Friend"	The Cast of Muriel's Wedding	3:57
21.	"Sydney (Remixed by Pip Norman)"	The Cast of Muriel's Wedding	3:29

== Reception ==
Muriel's Wedding received very positive critical responses. The Sydney Morning Herald commented that: "Muriel's Wedding feels like the complete package: a beloved film seamlessly updated; a central character who retains all the ambiguities that made you root for her in the first place; a conspicuously inventive score peppered with classic pop hits, and a mainstage debut that will be talked about for years. Adapting his own screenplay to the stage and into the social media present, PJ Hogan's book amplifies the Cinderella aspects of Muriel's story without sacrificing the satirical and melancholic elements that gave the film its depth and heart."

=== Awards and nominations ===
Muriel's Wedding received seven 2017 Sydney Theatre Awards, including Best Production of a Mainstage Musical and Best Original Score of a Mainstage Production, as well as for its direction, choreography, musical direction, Jones as female actor in a supporting role in a musical, and McKenna as newcomer. It was nominated for Best New Australian Work, and in four other categories.

Its text received the 2018 AWGIE Award for Music Theatre, and the AWGIE Awards' David Williamson award for excellence in writing for Australian theatre.

The musical won five 2018 Helpmann Awards including Best Original Score, and was also nominated for Best Musical and Best New Australian Work, amongst others.

At the 2020 Melbourne Green Room Awards, Muriel's Wedding received four Musical Theatre category awards for Original Australian Writing, Choreography, Set Design and Costume Design, and was also nominated for Production, Direction, Lead Role (Abbott), Supporting Role (Jones), and Lighting and Multimedia Design (Trent Suidgeest for the lighting).

Year	Award	Category	Nominee	Result	Ref(s)
2018	Helpmann Awards	Best Choreography in a Musical	Andrew Hallsworth	Won	
2018	Helpmann Awards	Best Direction of a Musical	Simon Phillips	Nominated	
2018	Helpmann Awards	Best Female Actor in a Musical	Maggie McKenna	Nominated	
2018	Helpmann Awards	Best Female Actor in a Supporting Role in a Musical	Christie Whelan Browne	Nominated	
2018	Helpmann Awards	Best Female Actor in a Supporting Role in a Musical	Madeleine Jones	Nominated	
2018	Helpmann Awards	Best Musical	Sydney Theatre Company and Global Creatures	Nominated	
2018	Helpmann Awards	Best New Australian Work	PJ Hogan, Kate Miller-Heidke & Keir Nuttall	Nominated	
2018	Helpmann Awards	Best Original Score	Kate Miller-Heidke & Keir Nuttall	Won	
2018	Helpmann Awards	Best Music Direction	Isaac Hayward	Won	
2018	Helpmann Awards	Best Costume Design	Gabriela Tylesova	Won	
2018	Helpmann Awards	Best Sound Design	Michael Waters	Won	

== Notes ==
^a While these songs are titled the same, the latter is a reprise.
^b This song is retitled on the cast recording as simply "A True Friend".
