= Stephen Madsen =

Australian actor (born 1992)

- Born: 15 August 1992 (age 34)
- Occupation: Actor
- Years active: 2015–present
- Known for: Muriel's Wedding; Heathers: The Musical

Stephen Madsen is an Australian actor. He is best known for his role as Jason "J.D." Dean in the Australian production of Heathers: The Musical, and for originating the role of Alexander Shkuratov in the musical Muriel's Wedding.

== Early life and education ==
Madsen is the son of Sally, a doctor, and Ross, growing up in Mona Vale, New South Wales. As a child, he attended Mona Vale Public School and Manly Selective Campus. Madsen graduated from the Western Australian Academy of Performing Arts in 2014.

== Career ==
Madsen made his Sydney theatre debut as Jason "J.D." Dean in the Australian premiere of Heathers: The Musical at the Hayes Theatre in 2015. That same year, he portrayed Mark Cohen in Rent; also at the Hayes Theatre.

In 2016, Madsen returned to the role of Jason Dean for the Australian tour of Heathers: The Musical. He subsequently appeared in Sport For Jove Theatre Company's production of One Flew Over the Cuckoo's Nest at the Seymour Centre, Sydney.

He originated the role of swimmer Alexander Shkuratov in the world premiere of Muriel's Wedding at Sydney Theatre Company. He features on the Original Cast Recording released by Sony Music Australia.

He returned to the Hayes Theatre in 2018 as Patrick in the Australian premiere of The View Upstairs. He played Alan in Darlinghurst Theatre Company's 2018 production of Torch Song Trilogy.

In 2022, he played conniving frenchman Marcel Benoit in the Sydney Theatre Company production of White Pearl by Anchuli Felicia King at the newly-renovated Wharf Theatre. He toured with the production to Canberra and Parramatta. That same year, he played Carl in the first major Australian production of Sarah Kane's Cleansed.

He starred as the legendary warrior Achilles in Holding Achilles, an epic co-production between Dead Puppet Society and Legs on the Wall, for its world premiere at Brisbane Festival in 2022 and a subsequent season for Sydney Festival in 2023. He appeared in Sex Magick at Griffin Theatre Company in the same year.

In 2025, he reprised his performance in Muriel's Wedding for the UK Premiere at the Curve Theatre. He also appeared in Spartacus: House of Ashur, and joined the supporting cast of Australian soap opera Home and Away as Eddie Shepherd. He made his debut in October 2025.

== Personal life ==
Madsen lives in Elizabeth Bay, New South Wales.

== Theatre credits ==
Year	Production	Role	Venue
2015	Heathers: The Musical	Jason "J.D." Dean	Hayes Theatre
2015-16	Rent	Mark Cohen	Hayes Theatre
2016	Heathers: The Musical	Jason "J.D." Dean	QPAC Playhouse, Arts Centre Melbourne Playhouse, Sydney Opera House Playhouse
2017	One Flew Over the Cuckoo's Nest	Ruckly	Reginald Theatre, Seymour Centre
2017–18	Muriel's Wedding	Alexander Shkuratov	Roslyn Packer Theatre, Sydney Theatre Company
2018	The View UpStairs	Patrick	Hayes Theatre
2018	Torch Song Trilogy	Alan	Eternity Playhouse
2019	Muriel's Wedding	Alexander Shkuratov	Her Majesty's Theatre, Melbourne, Sydney Lyric, QPAC Lyric Theatre
2022	White Pearl	Marcel Benoit	Wharf Theatre, Sydney Theatre Company
2022	Cleansed	Carl	Old Fitzroy Theatre
2022	Holding Achilles	Achilles	QPAC Playhouse
2023	Sex Magick	Manmatha/Drayton/Gazza	SBW Stables Theatre
2023	Holding Achilles	Achilles	Carriageworks
2025	Muriel's Wedding	Alexander Shkuratov	Curve Theatre

== Filmography ==
=== Film ===
Year	Title	Role
2021	Marley, Someone	Lola
2025	Zombucha!	Kai

=== Television ===
Year	Title	Role
2019	Ms Fisher's Modern Murder Mysteries	Duane Gordon
2019	Secret Bridesmaids' Business	Brent Harcourt
2025	Spartacus: House of Ashur	Creticus
2025–2026	Home and Away	Eddie Shepherd

== Awards and nominations ==
Year	Awards	Category	Production	Result
2015	Sydney Theatre Awards	Best Newcomer	Heathers: The Musical	Nominated
2015	Sydney Theatre Awards	Judith Johnson Award for Best Performance by an Actor in a Musical	Rent	Nominated
2015	Sydney Theatre Awards	Best Performance by an Actor in a Supporting Role in a Musical	Heathers: The Musical	Nominated
2022	Sydney Theatre Awards	Best Ensemble	Cleansed	Nominated
