= Helpmann Award for Best Direction of a Musical =

Annual Australian musical theatre award

- Awarded for: Best Direction of a Musical
- Location: Australia
- Presented by: Live Performance Australia
- Currently held by: Trey Parker and Casey Nicholaw for The Book of Mormon (2017)
- Website: HelpmannAwards.com.au

The Helpmann Award for Best Direction of a Musical is a musical award, presented by Live Performance Australia (LPA) at the annual Helpmann Awards since 2001. This is a list of winners and nominations for the Helpmann Award for Best Direction of a Musical.

== Winners and nominees ==
Winners are listed first and marked in a separate colour

=== 2000s ===
Year	Director(s)	Production
2001 (1st)
2001 (1st)	Gale Edwards	The Boy from Oz
2001 (1st)	Nigel Jamieson	The Theft of Sita
2001 (1st)	Richard Wherrett	Shout! The Legend of the Wild One
2001 (1st)	Simon Phillips	Company
2002 (2nd)
2002 (2nd)	Gale Edwards	Sweeney Todd: The Demon Barber of Fleet Street
2002 (2nd)	David Atkins	Singin' in the Rain
2002 (2nd)	Phyllida Lloyd	Mamma Mia!
2002 (2nd)	Graeme Murphy	Tivoli
2003 (3rd)
2003 (3rd)	B.T. McNicholl, Sam Mendes and Rob Marshall	Cabaret
2003 (3rd)	Graham Gill and Sam Mendes	Oliver!
2003 (3rd)	James Powell	The Witches of Eastwick
2003 (3rd)	Nadia Tass	The Lion, the Witch and the Wardrobe
2004 (4th)
2004 (4th)	Julie Taymor	The Lion King
2004 (4th)	Dean Bryant	The Last Five Years
2004 (4th)	Ben Elton	We Will Rock You
2004 (4th)	Jack O'Brien (Originating Director). Recreated by Matt August	The Full Monty
2005 (5th)
2005 (5th)	Susan Stroman	The Producers
2005 (5th)	Stuart Maunder	H.M.S. Pinafore and Trial by Jury
2005 (5th)	Simon Phillips	Urinetown
2005 (5th)	Robert Wilson	The Black Rider
2006 (6th)
2006 (6th)	Simon Phillips	The 25th Annual Putnam County Spelling Bee
2006 (6th)	Stuart Maunder	Dusty – The Original Pop Diva
2006 (6th)	Robyn Nevin	Summer Rain
2006 (6th)	Gary Young	Menopause The Musical
2007 (7th)
2007 (7th)	Neil Armfield	Keating!
2007 (7th)	Laurence Connor	Miss Saigon
2007 (7th)	Craig llott	Hedwig and the Angry Inch
2007 (7th)	Simon Phillips	Priscilla, Queen of the Desert
2008 (8th)
2008 (8th)	Stephen Daldry in association with Julian Webber	Billy Elliot the Musical
2008 (8th)	Gale Edwards	Company
2008 (8th)	Michael Grandage and Jamie Lloyd	Guys and Dolls
2008 (8th)	Roger Hodgman	Little Me
2009 (9th)
2009 (9th)	Lisa Leguillou	Wicked
2009 (9th)	Geordie Brookman	Metro Street
2009 (9th)	Neil Gooding	Gutenberg! The Musical!
2009 (9th)	Stuart Maunder	My Fair Lady

=== 2010s ===
Year	Director(s)	Production
2010 (10th)
2010 (10th)	Jonathan Biggins	Avenue Q
2010 (10th)	Des McAnuff	Jersey Boys
2010 (10th)	Rosemary Myers	The Wizard of Oz
2010 (10th)	Simon Phillips	The Drowsy Chaperone
2011 (11th)
2011 (11th)	Richard Eyre and Matthew Bourne	Mary Poppins
2011 (11th)	David Atkins	Hairspray
2011 (11th)	Des McAnuff	Dr Zhivago
2011 (11th)	Simon Phillips	Love Never Dies
2012 (12th)
2012 (12th)	Roger Hodgman	Grey Gardens
2012 (12th)	Michael Bennett	A Chorus Line
2012 (12th)	Kristin Hanggi	Rock of Ages
2012 (12th)	Simon Phillips	An Officer and a Gentleman
2013 (13th)
2013 (13th)	Jerry Mitchell	Legally Blonde
2013 (13th)	Simon Phillips	A Funny Thing Happened on the Way to the Forum
2013 (13th)	Jerry Zaks	The Addams Family
2013 (13th)	Bartlett Sher	South Pacific
2014 (14th)
2014 (14th)	Dean Bryant	Sweet Charity
2014 (14th)	Baz Luhrmann	Strictly Ballroom The Musical
2014 (14th)	Christopher Renshaw	The King and I
2014 (14th)	Rosemary Myers	Pinocchio
2015 (15th)
2015 (15th)	John Tiffany	Once
2015 (15th)	Dean Bryant	Anything Goes
2015 (15th)	Laurence Connor and James Powell	Les Misérables
2015 (15th)	Stuart Maunder AM	Into the Woods
2016 (16th)
2016 (16th)	Matthew Warchus	Matilda the Musical
2016 (16th)	Roger Hodgman	Fiddler on the Roof
2016 (16th)	Simon Phillips	Ladies in Black
2016 (16th)	Dean Bryant	Little Shop of Horrors
2017 (17th)
2017 (17th)	Trey Parker and Casey Nicholaw	The Book of Mormon
2017 (17th)	Julie Andrews	My Fair Lady
2017 (17th)	Jerry Mitchell	Kinky Boots
2017 (17th)	Casey Nicholaw	Aladdin
2018 (18th)
2018 (18th)	Marc Bruni	Beautiful: The Carole King Musical
2018 (18th)	Simon Phillips	Dream Lover: The Bobby Darin Musical
2018 (18th)	Dean Bryant	Assassins
2018 (18th)	Simon Phillips	Muriel's Wedding
2019 (19th)
2019 (19th)	Francesca Zambello	Handa Opera on Sydney Harbour: West Side Story
2019 (19th)	Luke Joslin	In the Heights
2019 (19th)	Jack O'Brien	Roald Dahl's Charlie and the Chocolate Factory
2019 (19th)	Hal Prince	Evita

== See also ==
- Helpmann Awards
