= The Notebook of Trigorin =

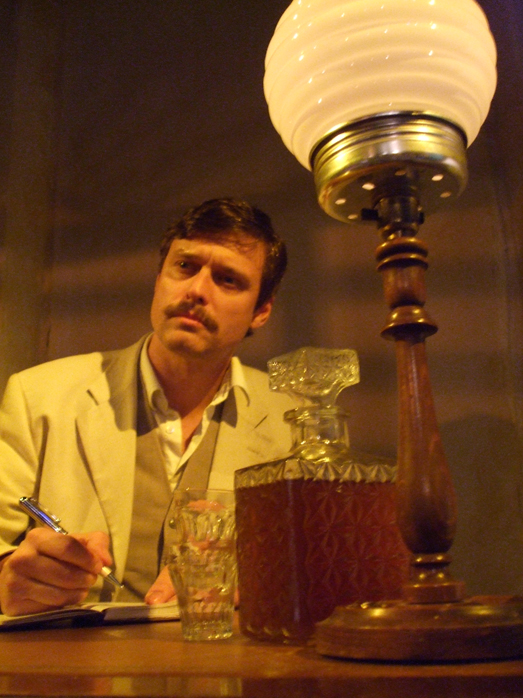
- Stephen Billington as Trigorin in the London première, April 2010.
- Original language: English
- Written by: Tennessee Williams

Premiere
- Date: 1981
- Place: Vancouver Playhouse, Vancouver, British Columbia

The Notebook of Trigorin is a play by American playwright Tennessee Williams, adapted from Anton Chekhov's drama The Seagull (1895). Williams based his adaptation primarily on Ann Dunnigan's 1960 translation.

The play was first produced in 1981 by the Vancouver Playhouse in Vancouver, British Columbia. In 1980, Williams' play The Red Devil Battery Sign had been given a new production at the Playhouse by artistic director Roger Hodgman while Williams was Writer in Residence at the University of British Columbia. Invited to return with a new play, Williams confessed his desire to adapt Chekov's The Seagull. The October 1981 production was confirmed before a single page of the adaptation was written. A 1996 production of the play by the Cincinnati Playhouse in the Park directed by Stephen Hollis and starring Lynn Redgrave as Madame Arkadina was the American premiere. The play received its London premiere at the Finborough Theatre in 2010. The production was directed by Phil Willmott and starred Stephen Billington as Trigorin. The play received its New York premiere with the Attic Theatre Company in 2013 at The Flea Theater. The production was directed by Laura Braza and starred Michael Schantz as Trigorin, with scenic design by Julia Noulin-Mérat.
