= Michael Beckley =

Australian actor

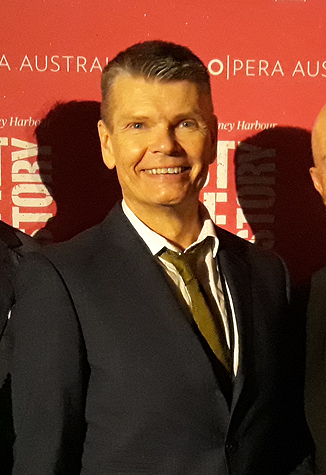
- Beckley at the opening night of Opera Australia's 'West Side Story' in which he appeared as Officer Krupke. 2019.
- Born: 1 November 1963 (age 62)
- Occupation: Actor
- Known for: Home and Away (2000–2004)

Michael Beckley is an Australian actor. He has worked with major theatre companies in both Australia and the United Kingdom, appearing on London's West End in A Few Good Men (starring Rob Lowe) and Cabaret. He is best known for playing Rhys Sutherland in Australian television series Home and Away from 2000 to 2004.

== Early life ==
Beckley decided on an acting career just before completing his senior high school studies. Despite protests from teachers he left school one week before his final exams. A week later – at 17 years of age – he had landed a permanent position on the Entertainment Staff at Old Sydney Town, an historical theme park near his home town of Gosford, NSW. Here he earned his Actors Equity of Australia card and officially became a working actor.

== Career ==
=== Acting ===
Beckley made his first permanent move to the UK in 1984. He appeared on the London Fringe in All The Way Home and attended dozens of plays in and around London, including many on the West End starring actors such as Anthony Hopkins (in Pravda) and Glenda Jackson (in Phaedra). He also took drop-in acting classes at the London Actors' Centre studying Chekhov, Shakespeare, comedy, voice and movement. It was during this time in London that he decided to commit to becoming an actor.

On returning to Australia in late 1986 he auditioned for Australia's leading drama school NIDA (National Institute of Dramatic Art) but was not accepted. He studied part-time under Gillian Owen, a RADA-trained actor, who ran the Sydney Acting School, and then auditioned for NIDA again in late 1987. He was accepted, and the next three years saw him studying there full-time.

With just one week of study to go – echoing his departure from high school – Beckley was approached by Wayne Harrison, then-artistic director of Sydney Theatre Company, to appear as Frid in the company's production of Sondheim's A Little Night Music. He appeared opposite a then-unknown Toni Collette as Petra. With the school's blessing, Beckley began his post-student career a week earlier than expected and graduated with his class at the official ceremony in early 1991.

The next few years saw Beckley work for various companies in a range of projects. These included a rigorous 6-month T.I.E. (theatre in education) tour for the Bell Shakespeare Company which he still considers as "earning one's stripes". Julia Zemiro was also a cast member.

He had guest roles on the Australian police series Water Rats and the Australian/American sci-fi series Farscape.

Wayne Harrison invited him back to the STC to appear in Antony and Cleopatra. The prestigious Griffin Theatre Company cast him in Clark in Sarajevo and then as the leading role of Dave in Neil Cole's play Alive at Williamstown Pier, the true story of a politician's fight with bipolar disorder and his consequent 'outing' by the Australian media. Beckley received strong praise for his portrayal from national critics.

Shortly after this, Beckley was cast as Rhys Sutherland in the long-running television program Home and Away, where he stayed for just over four years (2000–2004). His character arrived with a wife and three daughters. The Sutherlands went on to be one of the most popular families to ever appear on the program. While on the show, the production company made two specials for release on DVD – Hearts Divided and Secrets and the City, the latter film concerning Rhys's disappearance after the revelation of a previous affair.

Upon leaving Home and Away Beckley returned to England in 2005. Signing with a London agent, he booked his first audition, which found him playing Captain Roger Wittaker at the Theatre Royal Haymarket on London's West End. The play starred Rob Lowe in the role made famous by Tom Cruise in the film version, which was also written by Aaron Sorkin. Sorkin was very much involved in the casting process. The play ran for several months and was a major success in that year's West End calendar.

Beckley was soon cast in David Pownall's play Masterclass for Derby Theatre playing Joseph Stalin’s right-hand man Andrei Zhdanov, alongside Christopher McKay (Me and Orson Welles), Russell Dixon and Terry Mortimer. McKay and Mortimer, accomplished pianists, played a real grand piano in their respective roles of Shostakovich and Prokofiev. Beckley was also required to play some Chopin while seemingly drunk on vodka – a moment in the play that terrified him each night. Although a pianist, he was not as accomplished as McKay and Mortimer. Nonetheless, reviews were exceptional, with most of the London papers including it in their must-see lists.

Beckley continued to enjoy a run of successful and critical theatre roles. He returned to the West End for nearly a year to play Ernst Ludwig in Rufus Norris' wildly successful Cabaret at the Lyric Theatre, London. He played leading man Matt Holden in Chris England's play Breakfast with Jonny Wilkinson for the (then newly successful) Menier Chocolate Factory in London, and reprised the role in the film version in 2012.

One of Beckley's major roles was that of Randle P McMurphy in One Flew Over The Cuckoo's Nest, based on the novel by Ken Kesey, made particularly famous by the film version starring Jack Nicholson (as Randle P McMurphy). The production was staged by Curve in Leicester, with Catherine Russell as Nurse Ratched. Beckley in fact auditioned for the role of Dale Harding, however, director Michael Buffong decided Beckley was the right man to play McMurphy and offered him the part. During the run of Cuckoo's Nest, Curve's artistic director Paul Kerryson offered Beckley the role of Bradley in Sam Shephard's Pulitzer Prize-winning Buried Child. It starred Olivier Award-winner Matthew Kelly as Dodge. Bradley remains one of Beckley's favourite roles.

Kelly and Beckley would work together again in the 5-star hit production of Chekhov's The Seagull for Southward Playhouse in London in 2012 (Beckley credits a student production of this play at NIDA, seen in 1979, as being his catalyst for thinking about acting as a career). The Southwark Playhouse production also featured a then-unknown Lily James as Nina. The season was a sell-out.

Derby Theatre asked him back to play Joe Josephson in Sondheim’s Merrily We Roll Along. Menier Chocolate Factory also cast him again in The Invisible Man. The prestigious York Theatre Royal cast him as leading character Dr Robert Smith in the highly acclaimed play Blue/Orange.

Beckley also spent three years (2009, 2014, 2015) travelling to 30 countries in the role of Bill Austin in the world-wide hit musical Mamma Mia!. It was at the end of his last year with that show that he decided to return to Australia, where he has been since early 2016.

Since returning to his native country Beckley has appeared on the television programs Here Come The Habibs, Doctor Doctor, The Secret Daughter and House of Bond, as well as the new Australian musical Melba based on the life of opera star Dame Nellie Melba (played by international opera star Emma Matthews).

In 2019, Beckley appeared in the Opera Australia / Handa Opera on Sydney Harbour production of West Side Story as Officer Krupke – the titular character of the show's famous comedy number "Gee, Officer Krupke". The production was directed by multi-award-winning director Francesca Zambello. It was Beckley's first appearance with Opera Australia.

=== Directing ===
Michael Beckley was resident director on The Rocky Horror Show for Australian and New Zealand tours during the 1990s. He began in the chorus as a Phantom and then became Dance Captain. After the first one-year tour, director Nigel Triffitt offered Beckley the position of assistant director for the show's New Zealand tour. This position was changed to Resident Director when the show began a new Australian tour starring Jason Donovan in Perth.

Triffitt also used Beckley as his assistant for a revival of his 1990 Melbourne International Arts Festival hit production of Moby Dick for Sydney Theatre Company in 1998.

Beckley continued to direct through the late 1990s on shows such as The Seventh Knob (Belvoir St Theatre), Leader of the Pack (Laycock St Theatre, Gosford, 1996, return season 1997), Damn Yankees (full charity fund-raiser production, 1999) and assisted Jeremy Sims on the hugely successful Pork Chop Production of Rosencrantz and Guildenstern Are Dead (Belvoir St Theatre) and then again on the same company's production of Hamlet. Beckley also directed The Players for Pork Chop Productions at The Stables Theatre, Sydney.

== Filmography ==
=== Television ===
Year	Title	Character	Notes
1991	Home and Away	Vet	Season 4, 1 episode
1992	A Country Practice	Dr. Peter O'Sullivan	Episode: "Heartbreaker Part 1 & 2"
1993	Phoenix	Youth	Episode: "Safe as Houses"
1996	Water Rats	Roger Mulray	Episode: "Floater"
1999	Farscape	Hasko	Episode: "Rhapsody in Blue"
2000–2004	Home and Away	Rhys Sutherland	Seasons 13−17 (main role)
2013	Raw	Peter Mitchell	Season 5 (Ireland)
2016	Doctor Doctor	Radall McPherson	Season 1, 1 episode
2017	House of Bond	Kevin Bradley	Miniseries, parts 1 & 2
2017	Here Come the Habibs	Roland	2 episodes
2017	The Secret Daughter	Jasper	
2021	Australian Gangster	Locksmith	Miniseries, 1 episode
2022	The PM's Daughter	Carl	2 episodes
2022	After the Verdict	Vincent Lang	Miniseries, 3 episodes
2023	Ten Pound Poms	Head teacher	Episode 3
2023	North Shore	Gary Weaver	1 episode

=== Film ===
Year	Title	Role	Notes
2001	The New Crusaders	New Crusader	Short film
2012	Coma	Rupert	Short film (UK)
2012	Breakfast with Jonny Wilkinson	Matt Holden	Feature film (UK)

== Theatre ==
Year	Title	Character	Notes
1984	All The Way Home	John	Odyssey Theatre Company
1991	A Little Night Music	Frid	STC
1991	Macbeth	Duncan / Doctor	We Happy Few
1992	Actors at Work	Hamlet / Macbeth	Bell Shakespeare
1993	Three More Sleepless Nights	Pete	NIDA Theatre Company
1993	Antony and Cleopatra	Maecenus	STC
1994	Dylan	Angus Marius	Illustrious Theatre Company
1996	The Rocky Horror Show	Eddie / Dr Scott	Dainty Consolidated Entertainment
1997	Rosencrantz and Guildenstern Are Dead	Polonius	Pork Chop Productions
1998	Clark in Sarajevo	Various characters	Griffin Theatre Company
1999	Alive at Williamstown Pier	Dave	Griffin Theatre Company
2005	The Duck Variations	Emil	Pork Chop Productions
2005	Bill	Narrator / Detective	Short+Sweet
2005	A Few Good Men	Captain Roger Wittaker	Bill Kenwright Ltd
2006	Master Class	Andrei Zhdanov	Derby Playhouse
2006	Breakfast with Jonny Wilkinson	Matt Holden	Menier Chocolate Factory, London
2007	Merrily We Roll Along (musical)	Joe Josephson	Derby Theatre
2008	Cabaret	Ernst Ludwig	West End, London with Bill Kenwright Ltd
2009	Mamma Mia!	Bill Austin	International tour with Little Star Productions
2010–2011	The Invisible Man	Cuss / Fearenside / Colonel Adye	Menier Chocolate Factory, London
2011	One Flew Over the Cuckoo's Nest	Randall P McMurphy	Curve Theatre, Leicester
2011	Buried Child	Bradley	Curve Theatre, Leicester
2012	Blue/Orange	Dr Robert Smith	York Theatre Royal
2012	The Seagull	Shamreyev	Southwark Playhouse, London
2014–2015	Mamma Mia!	Bill Austin	International tour with Little Star Productions
2017	Melba	David Mitchell	Hayes Theatre, Sydney
2019	West Side Story	Officer Krupke	Handa Opera on Sydney Harbour with Opera Australia
2020	The Bridges of Madison County	Charlie	Hayes Theatre, Sydney with Neil Gooding Productions
