= Ladies in Black (TV series) =

- Genre: Drama
- Based on: The Women in Black by Madeleine St John
- Written by: Greg Waters; Sarah Bassiuoni; Joan Sauers; Randa Sayed
- Directed by: Gracie Otto
- Starring: Debi Mazar; Miranda Otto; Jessica De Gouw
- Country of origin: Australia
- Original languages: English; Korean; Italian
- No. of series: 1
- No. of episodes: 6

Production
- Executive producers: Greg Waters; Sue Milliken; Allanah Zitserman
- Producers: Sophia Zachariou; Angela Littlejohn; Greer Simpkin; David Jowsey
- Production company: Bunya productions

Original release
- Network: ABC
- Release: 16 June 2024 – present

Ladies in Black is a 2024 Australian television drama series based on the novel The Women in Black by Madeleine St John and second adaptation after the 2018 film, Ladies in Black. It aired on ABC on 16 June 2024.

== Production ==
In September 2023, it was announced the ABC had commissioned a six part series based on the book, which would see the women enter the sixties. In November 2023, the series was confirmed to be filming in South Australia, along with the announcement of the cast. On 11 September 2024, ABC announced that a second season of the series was in development.

== Cast ==
- Debi Mazar as Magda Szombathelyi, former head of Model Gowns, whose attempts to open her own boutique hits a staggering halt
- Miranda Otto as Virginia Ambrose, former Harrods employee taking over Magda's role
- Jessica De Gouw as Fay Janosi, a Goodes employee navigating married life with husband Rudi
- Kate Box as Cheri St. Claire, writer at Goodes
- Clare Hughes as Lisa Miles, a Goodes employee, also navigating life at university which includes writing for the school paper
- Azizi Donnelly as Angela Mansour, daughter of Dawud Mansour, the head of a rival fashion house, who starts at Goodes with the intent to steal their designs
- Julian Maroun as Elias Kahlil
- Carlos Sanson Jr as George Szombathelyi, Stefan's illegitimate son, who unexpectedly shows up in Sydney
- Tom Wilson as Richard White
- Sacha Horler as Dorothy Miles
- Huw Higginson as Mr. Ryder, boss of Goodes Department Store
- Russell Dykstra as Stefan Szombathelyi, Magda's husband
- Ryan Corr as Rudi Janos
- Eloise Mignon as Jenny Giles, a Goodes employee
- Hamish Michael as Ken Marlow, a businessman who had an affair with Fay years ago
- Krew Boylan as Enid Marlow, Ken's wife
- Ngali Shaw as Adam Conroy
- Hazem Shammas as Dawud Mansour, head of a rival fashion house and Angela's father
- Peter O’Brien as Don 'The Wolf' Holloway
- Gemma Ward as Sadie Chalmers
- Todd McKenney as Mr. MacKenzie, Goodes Chief Buyer

== Episodes ==
No.	Title	Directed by	Written by	Original release date	Australian viewers
1	"Beautiful Dream"	Gracie Otto	Greg Waters	16 June 2024	540,000
2	"Secret Designs"	Gracie Otto	Sarah Bassiuoni	23 June 2024	380,000
3	"Bikini Wars"	Gracie Otto	Joan Sauers	30 June 2024	344,000
4	"Spring Carnival"	Gracie Otto	Joan Sauers	7 July 2024	315,000
5	"Men in Briefs"	Gracie Otto	Sarah Bassiuoni	14 July 2024	322,000
6	"New Season"	Gracie Otto	Randa Sayed & Greg Waters	21 July 2024	285,000
