= Cleansed =

Play by Sarah Kane

- Original London poster
- Original language: English
- Written by: Sarah Kane
- Characters: Graham; Tinker; Carl; Rod; Grace; Robin; Woman
- Genre: In-yer-face theatre
- Setting: A university

Premiere
- Date: 30 April 1998
- Place: Royal Court Theatre Downstairs, London

Cleansed is the third play by the English playwright Sarah Kane. It was first performed in 1998 at the Royal Court Theatre Downstairs in London. The play is set in a university which (according to the blurb of the published script) is operating as "an institution designed to rid society of its undesirables" where "a group of inmates try to save themselves through love" while under the rule of the sadistic Tinker. When the play premiered at the Royal Court in April 1998, Kane played the part of Grace for the last three performances because of an injury that the original actress suffered.

It is sometimes claimed that Tinker was named after the theatre critic for British newspaper The Daily Mail, Jack Tinker, whose review of Kane's first play Blasted was headlined "this disgusting feast of filth", but there does not appear to be any evidence of Kane confirming this.

Sarah Kane's brother and executor of her estate, Simon Kane, in 2005 remarked that "overseas many, many people think that Cleansed is Sarah's best play."

== Synopsis ==
In the first scene, a timid Graham approaches Tinker, who appears to be a drug dealer. He says he 'wants out' and also asks for drugs. Tinker refuses. They then have an argument about whether or not they are friends. Tinker eventually injects Graham with drugs and he overdoses and dies.

Rod and Carl sit in a room together. Carl asks Rod if he can have his ring as a proposal of marriage. Rod initially refuses. Carl promises to always love him, never betray him, and never lie to him. Rod is cynical. Rod claims that Carl does not even know his real name, and states that he would never die for Carl. Carl is not fazed and keeps asking for the ring. Rod surrenders the ring but only says that he loves him now, and does not promise to love him forever. They kiss.

Grace enters the hospital demanding her brother, Graham's, clothes. The dialogue between her and Tinker imply that her twin brother, Graham, has died. Tinker brings Robin in, who is wearing Graham's clothes. The two switch clothing, with Grace wearing her brother's clothes and Robin wearing the dress Grace came in with (Robin was originally written as a man but is sometimes played by a woman). After a psychotic break triggered by her brother's lingering scent, Grace is admitted into the hospital. Grace asks Robin to write her father for her, but Robin reveals he cannot write.

In the next scene, Tinker beats Carl, wanting him to admit that he and Rod are romantically involved. He sodomizes Carl with a long pole, threatening to shove it through his body entirely. Carl gives up Rod's name and apologizes to Rod for it. Tinker then cuts out Carl's tongue and makes him swallow Rod's ring.

Grace has begun to hallucinate her brother. Stage directions and dialogue between them throughout the play imply that they had an incestuous relationship. Haunted by Graham, Grace tries to teach Robin how to read. Robin states his love for her, but Grace rejects him. Tinker comes into the room, tears out the writing in Robin's notebook, and leaves again. He goes and cuts off Carl's hands in front of Rod, who lays there and comforts him.

Tinker goes to see an exotic dancer, known simply as Woman, in a booth. He attempts to masturbate, but gets upset and leaves.

Rod sits in a room with Carl, remorsefully crying. Tinker enters and cuts off Carl's feet.

Robin buys a box of chocolates for Grace, who had mentioned that her previous boyfriend had bought her chocolates. Tinker confiscates the box of chocolates and questions Robin about them, who says they are for Grace. Tinker stands above him and throws chocolates on the ground towards him, demanding that he eats them. Crying, Robin is force-fed the whole box of chocolates.

In the next scene, Rod is crying, still, as Carl crawls up to him. They embrace, and then have sex. Rod vows never to lie to him, never to betray him, and to always love him. Tinker enters the room after they are finished, and slits Rod's throat in front of Carl, who holds him as he dies.

Grace and Robin sit together with Graham looking on. Robin works on counting the number of days in his 30-year sentence. Upset that Grace is not listening, Robin takes off the stockings he has been wearing and ties them around his neck. Grace continues not to pay attention, and Robin hangs himself.

Grace gets a sex change while in the hospital. She arrives onstage with bandages on her groin and breasts. Tinker says she's a lovely man, just like her brother. Carl awakes from the bed beside her. Upon the realization that his genitals were cut off and grafted onto Grace, he starts to cry. Tinker goes and has sex with the Woman, declaring his love for her.

In the final scene, Grace sits on stage with Carl, who is now wearing her dress. She speaks to Graham until she realizes he is not there. She thanks Tinker as Carl begins to cry again. Grace and Carl are alone on stage, when, finally, the sun comes out.

== Development ==
Sarah Kane stated that she "started [writing Cleansed] before Blasted was even staged" and that "it took three years to finish it."

Kane's friend and fellow playwright Mark Ravenhill has said "Kane told me she wrote Cleansed when she was in love" and that the play "[was not] written by a person who knew she would commit suicide."

Kane sent a draft of the script to the playwright Edward Bond. In a letter that Bond sent to Kane in September 1997, he wrote how he suspected that "Cleansed is even more powerful than [Blasted] because it takes any two or three minutes of Blasted and subjects them to great pressure."

According to Kane's agent, Mel Kenyon, The Royal Court theatre "commissioned [Cleansed] quite quickly, although again it took them a long time to put it on – in fact it took them so long they had to renew the rights after twelve months."

Kane claimed that she had written Cleansed specifically as a play that would only work as a piece of theatre and could not be adapted to other dramatic mediums: "I made the deliberate decision to write something that couldn't be film or television. Some people will argue that it can't be theatre either, but I want to stretch the theatrical language. Theatre might not be hip and cool, but at least there isn't any direct censorship, and you're never going to have that with film or TV".

Artistic influences

"The choice of acknowledged sources that inform Cleansed [is] the widest and more disparate of all of Kane's work"

— Graham Saunders, 'Love Me Or Kill Me': Sarah Kane and the Theatre of Extremes, page 87.

The play was partly inspired by Roland Barthes' work A Lover's Discourse. Kane commented that "There's a point in A Lover's Discourse when he says the situation of a rejected lover is not unlike the situation of a prisoner in Dachau. And when I read it I was just appalled and thought how can he possibly suggest the pain of love is as bad as that. But then the more I thought about it I thought actually I do know what he is saying. It's about the loss of self. And when you lose yourself where do you go? There's nowhere to go, it's actually a kind of madness. And thinking about it I made the connection with Cleansed."

Kane claimed that she based the structure of Cleansed on the play Woyzeck by Georg Büchner. She also directed a production of Woyzeck at the Gate Theatre, Notting Hill in 1997.

Other inspirations include Shakespeare's Twelfth Night, August Strindberg's The Ghost Sonata, Franz Kafka's The Trial and George Orwell's Nineteen Eighty-Four.

Grace's line directed at Graham "Love me or kill me" is taken from John Ford's tragedy 'Tis Pity She's a Whore. The line is said in Ford's play by the characters Bologna and Annabella who, like Grace and Graham in Cleansed, are siblings that are engaged in an incestuous relationship with each other.

Abandoned 'war' trilogy

At one point Kane planned for Cleansed to form the second part of a loose trilogy on the subject of war, with the first part being Blasted. Kane explained in a 1997 interview that "The link between [Blasted and Cleansed] is thematic rather than narrative for the simple reason that everyone at the end of Blasted is dead. [Cleansed is] a completely different play in every way. The trilogy will eventually amount to three responses to war." However, she then said to the interviewer "I've changed my mind about what the trilogy is about just in that second. They are not about war at all but about faith, hope and love in the context of war […] Blasted is about hope. Cleansed is about love. Scrap the bit before the war. It's suddenly become clear to me."

It was originally thought that the final part of this supposed trilogy was incomplete due to Kane's untimely death in 1999. However, according to Simon Kane (who is Sarah's brother and the executor of her estate) she only wrote "a very rough first draft" of the third play under the working title of "Viva Death" but she "abandoned the idea" as she thought it had too many similarities to her previous work and "she didn't want to repeat herself". Another reason why Viva Death might have been abandoned is because, according to Nils Tabert who was the German translator of Cleansed, Sarah Kane had purposely moved away from creating representations of violence when she wrote her next play Crave: "she called from Edinburgh at some stage saying 'I'm past violence – I'm really sick of it. It's becoming like Trainspotting with film – so marketable and boring and I don't want to deal with it anymore.'"

== Staging ==
=== Stage directions ===
The play is notable for its many difficult to achieve stage directions which have been described as "impossible". Examples include: "Tinker produces a large pair of scissors and cuts off Carl's tongue" (Scene Four). "A sunflower bursts through the floor and grows above their heads" (Scene Six). "The rats carry Carl's feet away" (Scene Fourteen).

Sarah Kane said "There's a Jacobean play with the stage direction 'Her spirit rises from her body and walks away, leaving her body behind.' Anyway, Shakespeare has a bear running across the stage in A Winter's Tale, and his stage craft was perfect".

Sarah Kane's friend and fellow playwright, David Greig, wrote about the play's stage directions in his introduction to Sarah Kane: Complete Plays:

"Theatrically, Cleansed is a daring challenge. It's physicalisation of lyrical imagery raises the same question that dogs Kane's first three plays: how do-able are they? […] This is a question that goes to the heart of Kane's writing. Every one of her plays asks the director to make radical staging decisions […] In a Kane play the author makes demands but she does not make solutions. Kane believed passionately that if it was possible to imagine something, it was possible to represent it. By demanding an interventionist and radical approach from her directors she was forcing them to go the limits of their theatrical imagination, forcing them into poetic and expressionistic solutions. […] With Cleansed, Kane wrote a play which demanded that its staging be as poetic as its writing."

Director of the 2016 National Theatre production of the play, Katie Mitchell, has said "Kane's stage directions request literal violence […] A tongue is cut off with a pair of scissors. Hands are cut off. So how do you do that in a way that is not symbolic?"

== Sarah Kane's performance as Grace ==
Towards the end of the production's run actress Suzan Sylvester was unable to perform as Grace due to being injured. Subsequently, two performances of the play were cancelled but the last three performances went ahead with Sarah Kane portraying the role of Grace instead.

Actor Daniel Evans, who played Robin, said that Sylvester "injured her back during one of the flying sequences". However, Sarah Kane and director James MacDonald claimed the injury was a result of Sylvester trying to pull her dog off another dog.

Kane explained:

"There are rumours circulating that I pushed an actress downstairs. It's not true. Her dog was trying to have sex with another dog in a park. And she was puling it off and slipped a disc. […] That is honestly what happened. And so we sort of sat there for two days going “what are we going to do? Could it be pushed back in place?” but the problem was that she had to be flown halfway up a wall and do all sorts of extraordinary things, which is just not possible to do with a slipped disc. So we were going to close, at which point I got very depressed and thought: "I can't quite bear for the play to end in this way". And in a moment of rashness I said "well, look, I know the lines. I could do it". And the next thing I knew I was being flown halfway up a wall going: “Nah, I can't do this...” But in the end, I did the last three nights. And it was amazing."

Director James MacDonald said that while rehearsing with Kane in the role they had reworked "the bit in which the actress used to be thrown up against the wall and beaten up" as "we couldn't risk a writer".

The Guardian reported that "Despite the fact that one insensitive member of the audience laughed himself silly when Kane's starring role was announced before the show, the playwright acquitted herself admirably in a role that offers nowhere to hide. It's even possible – at a stretch – to see the play's climatic stitching of a penis to her character's crotch as a symbol of the success of this audacious theatrical transplant."

Actor Daniel Evans said that Kane "learnt the lines and went on with almost no rehearsal – and she blew us all away. She was fearless and connected. The performance required her to dance, to fly, to remove all her clothes – and she did it without blinking." He also said "She was brilliant – extraordinary and above all raw. I always said that she made us look like actors, because she was so raw. She wasn't acting in the accepted sense of that term and any acting next door to that just seems like huge acting." Evans has also stated that "I consider that one of the great privileges of my life having acted alongside her as well as being in her plays."

Kane's performance was also praised by actor Stuart McQuarrie, who played Tinker. McQuarrie said "to have acted with Sarah when she took over for those last performances were some of the most extraordinary nights I'll ever have in the theatre. Her delivery was just perfect. That's how we all ought to have been doing it in – that was the way she wrote it. She couldn't have done it any other way just saying the lines."

Sarah Kane's agent, Mel Kenyon, remarked that "If I was going to put my hand on my heart I'd say [Kane] was a far better director than she was an actress".

Kane stated that she learnt more about acting from her experience of performing in Cleansed. In 1998 she sent a letter to the playwright Edward Bond, in which she wrote "I now know a) how hard acting is and b) how easy it is. I'm taking no more crap from directors about what is and isn't possible in performance. It can be such a simple thing, in fact I think it's the simplicity that makes it difficult, difficult but not complicated." Kane elaborated on this realisation of hers in a 1998 interview at Royal Holloway University:

"I can't talk about all acting, but what Cleansed asked for was extreme simplicity. And that's a very very difficult thing to do when you're standing in front of 400 people with no clothes on. Be simple […] Your instinct is to run away. But actually It's a very simple thing. What do I want? What do I feel? And how do I enable myself to feel that? I also learnt how difficult it is to do that, particularly in a play like Cleansed where you kind of disappear through a hole in the stage and you have precisely three and a half seconds to remove all your clothes, run around the back of the stage and get into a thing and come whizzing up through another hole. And I think at one point I said to one of the other actors: “God, this is really really hard isn't it?” And he said “Yes, it is.”"

== Initial reception ==
=== Audience response ===
The first production of Cleansed was attended by low audience numbers, with it reportedly playing to an average of just 14 percent of the theatre's audience capacity.

At an interview and Q&A session in 1998 at Royal Holloway University, Kane said:

"most good plays are only really liked in retrospect […] When Cleansed was on at the Royal Court there was one point we were playing to very very small audiences. I saw, God knows what it was on, but there was this bit of old TV footage [of] some actors who were in Serjeant Musgrave's Dance. One of the most brilliant plays of the last hundred years. And one of the actors was saying "You know, we don't understand it. We think it's a really good play and last night no one came". Literally no one turned up to see it. […] So how did it become such a classic, which it has. To me I think it's kind of, anything which no one turns up [to see] at some point is bound to turn out to be quite good. And anything that sells to packed out audiences, there's probably something wrong with it. There's probably a real problem there".

According to critic Aleks Sierz in his book In-Yer-Face Theatre: British Drama Today, when he saw the play "The audience, many of whom were gay, was very small but appreciative. People loved the play's gender confusions, laughing at Robin's clumsiness as he and Grace swap clothes, and were also gripped by the raw emotion onstage; only one person walked out."

However, this seems to be contradicted by critic Graham Saunders who said "I gather Cleansed was not the most audience friendly of plays and sometimes got a hostile reaction" when interviewing actor Stuart McQuarrie, who originated the role of Tinker. In response McQuarrie said the following:

"We regularly got booed especially towards the end when they saw the sewed up penis on Grace. I remember one particular time – again right at the end of the performance and the audience was clapping and someone shouted out, 'boo! What's it all about?' And what I desperately wanted to do was climb down and go into the audience to find him and bring him up onstage and try to explain the play, but then I'm glad I didn't because it would've been a terrible thing to do, because I really respect that guy for making his feelings known when everyone else may have been clapping out of duty. There was another occasion when people were just uncontrollably laughing, and again I had to just try and get rid of the anger and just carry on, because when it happens during a show it's often not the real feelings of these people. In a way it's gratifying to get an effect – even if that effect is sometimes negative. I think many people came away from Cleansed thinking 'what the fuck was that about. It was atrocious. It was awful.' I remember some friends of mine came to see it and they just couldn't say anything."

== Cast and characters ==
| Character | London | Hamburg | London Revival | London Revival | Sydney | London Revival |
| Character | 1998 | | 2005 | 2016 | 2022 | 2026 |
|---|---|---|---|---|---|---|
| Graham | Martin Marquez | Uwe Bohm | Garry Collins | Graham Butler | Tommy Misa | Jack Riddiford |
| Tinker | Stuart McQuarrie | Ulrich Mühe | Paul Brennan | Tom Mothersdale | Danny Ball | Leo Bill |
| Carl | James Cunningham | Philipp Hochmair | Toby Dantzic | Peter Hobday | Stephen Madsen | Luke Cinque-White |
| Rod | Danny Cerqueira | Knut Koch | Sean Gallagher | George Taylor | Charles Purcell | Parth Thakerar |
| Grace | Suzan Sylvester | Susanne Lothar | Polly Frame | Michelle Terry | Mây Tran | Pearl Chanda |
| Robin | Daniel Evans | August Diehl | Craig Gazey | Matthew Tennyson | Jack Richardson | Stuart Thompson |
| Woman | Victoria Harwood | Gabi Herz | Lisa Daveney | Natalie Klamar | Fetu Taku | Lizzy Connolly |

== Production history ==
=== London (1998) ===
The play received its world premiere on 30 April 1998 at London's Royal Court Theatre. It was directed by James Macdonald. For the last three performances Grace was played by Sarah Kane as Suzan Sylvester suffered an injury.

=== Hamburg (1998) ===
The play received its German premiere on 12 December 1998 at the Hamburg Kammerspiele in Hamburg. It was translated in German by Elisabeth Plessen, Nils Tabert and Peter Zadek under the title, Gesäubert. The Production was directed by Peter Zadek.

=== Poland (2001) ===
The play received its Polish premiere on 15 December 2001 at Teatr Współczesny. It was translated in Polish by Krzysztof Warlikowski and Jacek Poniedziałek under the title, Oczyszczeni. The production was directed by Warlikowski.

=== London Revival (2005) ===
The play received its first London revival on 2 November 2005 at the Arcola Theatre. It was performed by the Oxford Stage Company and directed by Sean Holmes.

=== London Revival (2016) ===
A new revival of the play premiered at the National Theatre, Dorfman in London on 23 February 2016. The production was directed by Katie Mitchell.

=== Sydney (2022) ===
The play received its Australian premiere with Red Line Productions on 10 June 2022 at the Old Fitzroy Theatre in Sydney. The production was directed by Dino Dimitriadis.

=== London Revival (2026) ===
The London revival of the play premiered in July 2026 at the Almeida Theatre, directed by Rebecca Frecknall.. Arifa Akbar, theatre critic for The Guardian, wrote in a review that "It is courageous of director Rebecca Frecknall to take it on. The gamble pays off, both in its terrible resonance in our violent world and in her formidable creative accomplishment."

== Interpretations and analysis ==
=== Dream interpretation ===
The academic and playwright Dan Rebellato has noted that much of the play's action could be interpreted as a dream or hallucination: "After all, are these events even real? There's certainly a way of seeing Cleansed as enfolding entirely in the dying mind of Graham as he takes the lethal dose of crack at the end of scene 1. […] The play's images have a dream-like quality at times […] But at the same time, the play insists that these are real events and asks us to bridge the gap between nightmare and reality."

Reviewing the first production of Cleansed, the critic John Peter wrote about the nightmarish quality of the play:

"Cleansed (Royal Court/Duke of York's) is a nightmare of a play: like a nightmare, it unreels somewhere between the back of your eyes and the centre of your brain with an unpredictable but remorseless logic. As with a nightmare, you cannot shut it out because nightmares are experienced with your whole body. As with a nightmare, you feel that someone else is dreaming it for you, spinning the images out of some need you don't want to think of as your own. […] Cleansed is indeed incomprehensible and vile, in the way nightmares are, with all the poem-like tyrannical cohesion of nightmares."

Katie Mitchell's 2016 National Theatre production of the play had the character of Grace present in every scene. Mitchell said this decision was made "to cohere the twenty scenes" and also as the play then could be interpreted as dream:

"We decided […] that it was the dream of one character which is Grace, who's a character who's lost her brother. He died of a heroin overdose and she has this amazing dream. And so we just put her there at the centre [of the play]. And then when we worked on it we thought it was more useful to work on it as a genre surrealism than naturalism. Because then we could have a lot of illogical things happening […] A lot of illogical things happen in the play, let alone all the bits of illogic that we added. But doing it as surrealism meant that the actors could be happily inside a dream-landscape committing to what they were doing as opposed to going 'but this doesn't add up. Why is my character doing this and not that?' and asking all of those questions that you normally ask when you're in a realistic genre."
