= Simon Phillips (director) =

New Zealand-Australian stage director (born 1958)

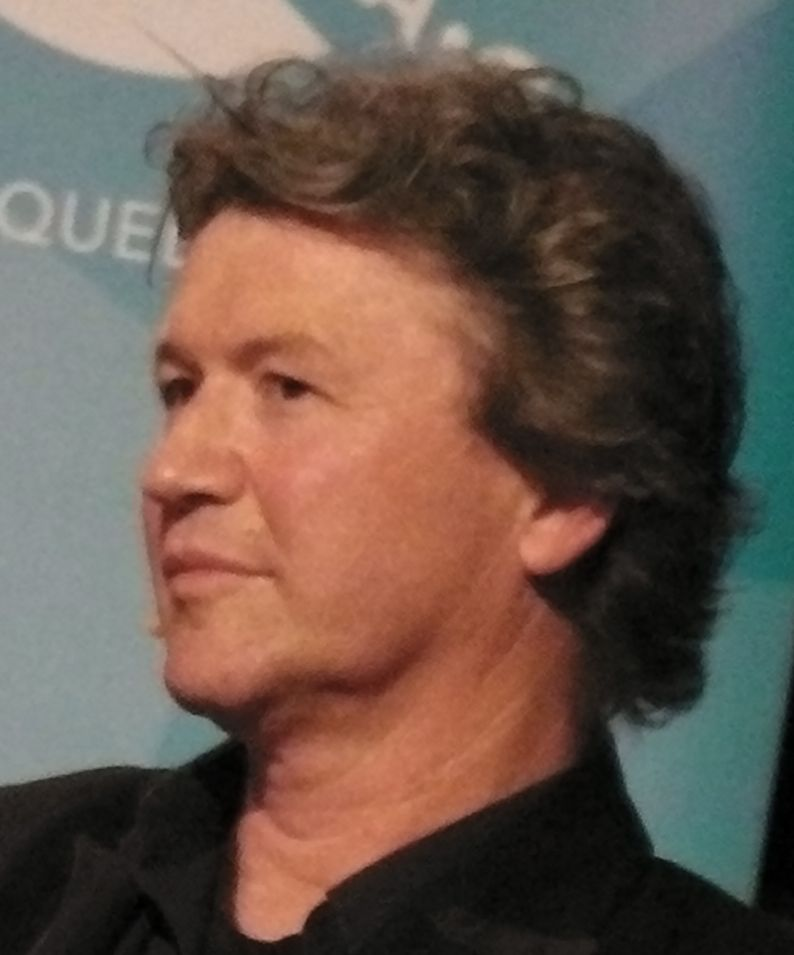
Simon Phillips, 2013

Simon Phillips (born 1958) is a New Zealand-born Australian theatre director whose work encompasses drama, musical theatre and opera. He has worked as artistic director of the State Theatre Company of South Australia and the Melbourne Theatre Company and has directed productions in Australia, New Zealand, the United Kingdom, the United States and Germany. His musical theatre work includes Priscilla, Queen of the Desert, which he developed for the stage and directed in Australia, the West End and on Broadway, Love Never Dies, Ladies in Black and Muriel's Wedding the Musical. He has also directed opera for Opera Australia, New Zealand Opera and the Hamburg State Opera.

== Early career ==
Phillips was born in New Zealand and trained as an actor at the drama school Toi Whakaari, graduating in 1980 with a Diploma in Acting. He subsequently worked in New Zealand theatre before moving to Australia in 1984, where he became a lecturer and director at the Western Australian Academy of Performing Arts (WAAPA). He joined the Melbourne Theatre Company as an associate director in 1987.

In 1990, Phillips was appointed artistic director of the State Theatre Company of South Australia, a position he held until 1993. He subsequently developed a career directing contemporary drama, classical theatre and new Australian writing, with productions of works by writers including Edward Albee, Samuel Beckett, Bertolt Brecht, Caryl Churchill, David Hare, Martin McDonagh, Joe Orton, Sam Shepard and Tom Stoppard. He has also directed premieres of works by Australian writers including David Williamson, Hannie Rayson, Stephen Sewell, Matt Cameron and Joanna Murray-Smith.

Phillips has directed Shakespeare throughout his career, alongside contemporary drama, musical theatre and opera.

== Melbourne Theatre Company ==
Phillips returned to the Melbourne Theatre Company as artistic director in 2000, succeeding Roger Hodgman. He remained in the position until 2011. During his tenure he oversaw the company's move to a new permanent headquarters at Southbank, including the development and construction of the Southbank Theatre, while continuing to direct major productions for the company.

His tenure encompassed both established classical and contemporary repertoire and the development of new Australian work. He also continued to direct productions outside the company during this period, increasingly working in musical theatre and opera.

== Priscilla, Queen of the Desert ==
Phillips directed the original stage production of Priscilla, Queen of the Desert – The Musical, based on the 1994 Australian film. The musical premiered in Sydney in 2006 before transferring to Melbourne and subsequently touring internationally. Phillips is credited as both director and developer of the stage production.

The production transferred to London's West End in 2009, where Phillips again directed, and subsequently opened on Broadway in 2011. The Broadway production ran at the Palace Theatre from March 2011 to June 2012.

The musical subsequently received productions and tours in the United States, United Kingdom and elsewhere.

== Love Never Dies ==
Phillips directed a new Australasian production of Andrew Lloyd Webber's Love Never Dies, a sequel to The Phantom of the Opera. The production, the first staging of the musical outside the United Kingdom, opened at Melbourne's Regent Theatre in 2011 with a new Australian creative team and a substantially reworked production. It subsequently transferred to Sydney.

The Melbourne production was filmed by Universal in September 2011 for international release, with Phillips directing the stage production. The filmed version was released on DVD and Blu-ray in 2012 and was also screened in cinemas in several countries.

== Ladies in Black ==
Phillips directed the original production of Ladies in Black, with a score by Tim Finn and a book by Carolyn Burns, based on Madeleine St John's novel. The musical premiered in Brisbane in 2015 and subsequently transferred to Melbourne before touring Australia.

The production received the Helpmann Award for Best New Australian Work. Phillips was also nominated for Best Direction of a Musical.

== Muriel's Wedding ==
Phillips directed Muriel's Wedding the Musical, adapted from the 1994 film Muriel's Wedding by its writer and director P. J. Hogan, with music and lyrics by Kate Miller-Heidke and Keir Nuttall. The stage musical was initiated by Australian producer Carmen Pavlovic and Global Creatures, which acquired the rights to develop the stage adaptation and brought Phillips on board as director. Global Creatures and the Sydney Theatre Company subsequently formed a co-producing partnership for the musical's world premiere in Sydney in 2017.

The production received seven Sydney Theatre Awards, including Best Production of a Mainstage Musical and Best Direction of a Musical for Phillips. At the 2018 Helpmann Awards, it received nominations including Best Musical, Best New Australian Work and Best Direction of a Musical.

Global Creatures subsequently produced a return Australian season and national tour in 2019, retaining Phillips and the principal creative team. In 2025, Global Creatures and Leicester's Curve Theatre presented the musical's UK premiere, again directed by Phillips. He directed the Australian premiere, the 2019 Australian season and tour, and the 2025 UK premiere.

== Other musical theatre ==
Other musical theatre productions directed by Phillips include A Funny Thing Happened on the Way to the Forum, The Drowsy Chaperone, The 25th Annual Putnam County Spelling Bee, Urinetown, Company, The Threepenny Opera, Cabaret, Dream Lover – The Bobby Darin Musical, High Society and An Officer and a Gentleman.

== Opera ==
Phillips has directed opera in Australia, New Zealand and Germany. His productions for Opera Australia include Il turco in Italia, L'elisir d'amore, Falstaff, La bohème and Lulu. His work for New Zealand Opera includes The Magic Flute and Don Giovanni, while his productions for the Hamburg State Opera include A Midsummer Night's Dream and Billy Budd.

In 2022 and 2026, Phillips directed productions of The Phantom of the Opera for Opera Australia's Handa Opera on Sydney Harbour.

== Awards ==
Phillips has received seven Green Room Awards and six Helpmann Awards for his work in Australian theatre. He has also received numerous other awards and nominations for directing drama and musical theatre.
