= Handa Opera on Sydney Harbour =

Opera festival in Australia

Handa Opera on Sydney Harbour (HOSH) is an annual open-air event presented by Opera Australia on Sydney's iconic harbour off Mrs Macquarie's Point, set against the backdrop of the Sydney Opera House and the Sydney Harbour Bridge.

During the 2013 production of Carmen, the stage was transformed into the set of The Ellen DeGeneres Show for the program's first ever overseas pre-recorded taping. Welcoming more than 3,000 fans, Ellen DeGeneres played a variety of games during filming and hosted a Q&A session at the end.

Aida was the first production in which Haruhisa Handa, the main benefactor of the production, attended.

In recent years, Opera Australia has moved away from staging opera classics and moving towards musicals. The first musical on the harbour, West Side Story in 2019, saw a record 65,000 people attend the production, leading to Opera Australia showing The Phantom of the Opera a few years later.

For the 2025 production of Guys and Dolls, the designer Brian Thomson incorporated for the first time the live orchestra on stage, rather than underneath, via a massive scaffolding structure and a translucent One Way sign.

In July of 2025, it was announced The Phantom of the Opera would be returning to the Handa Opera on Sydney Harbour stage, which would launch the musical's global 40th anniversary celebrations.

Haruhisa Handa ceased his sponsorship in October 2026.

== Productions ==
Title	Year	Director(s)	Designer(s)	Choreographer(s)	Conductor(s)					
Title	Year	Director(s)	Designer(s)	Choreographer(s)	Conductor(s)	La traviata	2012	Francesca Zambello	Brian Thomson, Tess Schofield	Brian Castles-Onion
Carmen	2013	Gale Edwards	Brian Thomson	Kelley Abbey	Brian Castles-Onion					
Madama Butterfly	2014	Àlex Ollé	La Fura dels Baus		Brian Castles-Onion					
Aida	2015	Gale Edwards			Brian Castles-Onion					
Turandot	2016	Chen Shi-Zheng			Brian Castles-Onion					
Carmen	2017	Gale Edwards, Andy Morton			Brian Castles-Onion					
La bohème	2018	Andy Morton			Brian Castles-Onion					
West Side Story	2019	Francesca Zambello		Jerome Robbins	Guy Simpson					
La traviata	2020, 2021	Constantine Costi	Brian Thomson, Tess Schofield, John Rayment, Des O'Neill	Shannon Burns	Brian Castles-Onion					
The Phantom of the Opera	2022	Simon Phillips	Gabriela Tylesova	Simone Sault	Guy Simpson					
Madama Butterfly	2023	Àlex Ollé	Alfons Flores, Lluc Castells		Brian Castles-Onion					
West Side Story	2024	Francesca Zambello	Brian Thomson, Jennifer Irwin		Guy Simpson					
Guys and Dolls	2025	Shaun Rennie	Brian Thomson, Jennifer Irwin	Kelley Abbey	Guy Simpson					
The Phantom of the Opera	2026	Simon Phillips	Gabriela Tylesova	Simone Sault	Guy Simpson					
Aida	2027 (Note: Aida (2027) with HSBC as principal partner)	Gale Edwards	Mark Thompson, Matt Scott, Tony David Cray	Lucas Jervies						
