= Future D. Fidel =

Congolese-Australian playwright

Future D. Fidel is a Congolese-Australian playwright.

Future Destin Fidel was born in the Democratic Republic of the Congo and became an orphan at the age of 13. Living with his sister at Uvira on the shores of Lake Tanganyika, he fled across the lake to Tanzania when his village was threatened by soldiers during civil unrest. He spent eight years in Nyarugusu, a Tanzanian refugee camp, before coming to Australia as a refugee in 2005.

In Australia, Fidel joined a Kwatamaja (African) Dance Group, participated in acting workshops and with other young refugees formed the Fimbo Boys performing African modern dance and song. He contributed to the community theatre work I Am Here featuring young people who came to Australia following conflict.

Fidel graduated in 2013 as an electrical engineer.

Prize Fighter, his first full-length play, was premiered by La Boite Theatre and Brisbane Festival in 2015. Fidel was nominated for Best New Australian Work and the production was nominated for Best Play at the 2016 Helpmann Awards.

The play went on to win Best Production at the 2019 Matilda Awards.

Best known for his stage name as Future Destin, He followed a solo path as a Gospel Artist in 2009 and released his first Album The Power of Three, Trinity in 2013. His follow up EP was released 2 years later with one of this song on the EP "Living For The Kingdom" being selected by a Sydney based Christian Lebel Company "Downunder Lebel Group" as one of their SIX-Collection song of that year.

He later switched courses and started releasing songs in his mother tongue (Kibembe). He has now recorded songs such as Ina (Dance), To'ete (No) and Ba Olobela (They're getting a habit). Future has collaborated with Burundi's Queen of Pop and RnB singer Natacha, and preparing more songs with other Congolese and Tanzanian Artists such as Joel Lwaga, Stamina Shorwebwenzi and Galley.
