= The Essence of the Thing =

Book by Madeleine St John

- First edition
- Author: Madeleine St John
- Language: English
- Genre: Literary
- Publisher: Fourth Estate, London
- Publication date: 1997
- Media type: Print Paperback
- Pages: 234 pp
- ISBN: 1857024184
- Preceded by: A Pure Clear Light
- Followed by: A Stairway to Paradise

The Essence of the Thing (1997) is a novel by Australian author Madeleine St John. It was shortlisted for the Man Booker Prize in 1997. The novel is uniquely formatted, having a total of 69 chapters in just 234 pages. St John aims to depict the titular essence of a specific thing in each individual chapter.

== Plot summary ==
The novel begins suddenly with the harsh end of the relationship between the protagonist Nicola Gatling and her lover Jonathan. As Nicola returns from a trip to the shops to get some cigarettes, she is told by Jonathan that he wants her to move out of the apartment they just decided to purchase together. Leaning on family and friends, Nicola attempts to remake her life over the ensuing several weeks in 1990s London.

== Awards ==
- 1997 shortlisted for the Man Booker Prize

== Notes ==
The novel carried the following dedication:

"For Judith McCue"

== Reviews ==
Gardner McFall in The New York Times in 1999 opined "In this novel, which was a finalist for the 1997 Booker Prize, Madeleine St. John shapes what might have been a bathetic story into a brisk, sophisticated and artful narrative buoyed by an ironic use of the religious imagery of hell, salvation and resurrection."

The book was re-issued in 2013 as part of the Text Publishing Text Classics series. At the time of the publication of that edition Gay Lynch wrote in Transnational Literature: "The prose is spare, supple and elegant, and constructed for the most part in dialogue that, occasionally, falls into a mechanical 'jolly hockey-sticks' register, with frequent play on the words 'whizzy' and the suffix 'ish'...Nevertheless, St John is a fine writer and this book is no grungy Australian bildungsroman; it is more a comedy of manners, perhaps or a Roman à clef."
