= Netochka Nezvanova =

1849 unfinished novel by Fyodor Dostoevsky

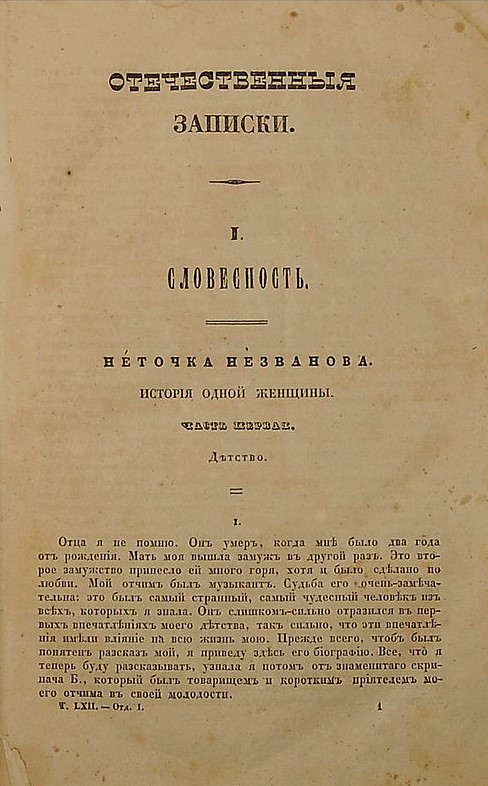
- First publication in Otechestvennye Zapiski (1849)
- Author: Fyodor Dostoevsky
- Original title: Неточка Незванова
- Translator: Ann Dunnigan (1972); Jane Kentish (1985)
- Language: Russian
- Genre: Bildungsroman
- Publisher: Otechestvennye zapiski
- Publication date: 1849
- Publication place: Russia
- Media type: Print (Hardback & Paperback)
- Pages: 173 pp

Netochka Nezvanova (Russian: Не́точка Незва́нова) is an unfinished novel by Fyodor Dostoevsky. It was originally intended as a large-scale work in the form of a 'confession', but a background sketch of the eponymous heroine's childhood and adolescence is all that was completed and published. According to translator Jane Kentish, this first publication was intended as "no more than a prologue to the novel". Dostoevsky began work on the novel in 1848 and the first completed section was published at the end of 1849. Further work was prevented by the author's arrest and exile to a Siberian detention camp for his part in the activities of the Petrashevsky Circle. After his return in 1859, Dostoevsky never resumed work on Netochka Nezvanova, leaving this fragment forever incomplete.

The novel is in the style of a Bildungsroman, depicting experiences and emotions from Netochka's formative years, as recalled by her in maturity.

== Plot summary ==
The plot unfolds in three distinct sections, corresponding to upheavals in the heroine's life.

Chapters 1–3 are predominantly concerned with Netochka's recollections of her childhood with her mother and stepfather in St. Petersburg, up until the time of their deaths. She begins with the background story of her stepfather, Efimov, a talented but self-obsessed violinist, whom she describes as "the strangest and most extraordinary person I have ever known" and a man whose powerful influence over her affected the rest of her life. Efimov's madness brings terrible poverty and discord to the family, and leaves the child with a premature and painful insight into the dark side of human emotions. This part of her life comes to an end when Efimov kills her mother, after which he himself becomes completely insane and dies.

Netochka is adopted by Prince X., an acquaintance of her stepfather, and chapters 4 and 5 are concerned with the orphaned girl's immersion in this unfamiliar aristocratic world, focusing particularly on her relationship with the Prince's daughter Katya. Netochka immediately falls in love with the beautiful Katya, but Katya is initially repelled by the strange newcomer, and is cruel and dismissive toward her. Over time, however, this apparent dislike transforms into an equally passionate reciprocation of Netochka's feelings. Their young, unashamed love leads to an intimacy that alarms Katya's mother, who eventually takes steps to ensure their separation. Katya's family move to Moscow, and Netochka is placed in the care of Katya's elder half-sister, Alexandra Mikhailovna. According to the narrator, Netochka and Katya will not see each other for another eight years, but as the novel remained unfinished, their reuniting is never described.

The final chapters describe Netochka's teenage years growing up in the household of the gentle and maternal Alexandra Mikhailovna and her cold and distant husband Pyotr Alexandrovitch. She forms a deeply empathetic relationship with Alexandra Mikhailovna, but is troubled by her friend's painfully solicitous attitude toward her husband, and by what appears to be calculated indifference and dissimulation on his part. Netochka suspects some mystery from their past, and eventually a clue presents itself in the form of a letter that she accidentally discovers pressed between the pages of an old book in the library. It is a letter to Alexandra Mikhaylovna from a distraught lover, lamenting the necessity of their final separation, and grieving for the irreparable harm he has caused her reputation and her marriage. Netochka's discovery of the letter sets off a chain of events that bring Alexandra Mikhaylovna to the point of emotional breakdown, and Netochka to the point of womanhood as she confronts Pyotr Alexandrovitch with the truth of what he has done to his wife.

Several narrative threads, as with the relationship between Netochka and Katya, are left unresolved but with clear indications that they would be resumed in future installments of the novel. It is noticed, at first by Alexandra Mikhailovna, that Netochka has a beautiful singing voice, and arrangements are made for her to receive training. Her love of singing and its connection to her emotional life are examined in a number of scenes, but her artistic development is clearly only in its beginning stages. The novel finishes with an enigmatic exchange between Netochka and Ovrov, Pyotr Alexandrovitch's secretary, that is suggestive of further development of the story relating to the love letter.

== Themes ==
=== Art and the Artist ===
The status of art and the artist, particularly the Romantic artist, was a subject of much literary discussion in the late 1840s, and Netochka Nezvanova was intended to be Dostoevsky's literary statement of his view on the issue. According to Joseph Frank, Dostoevsky's ultimate aim, though it remained unrealized, was "to portray a character that unites a dedication to art with an equally firm commitment to the highest moral-social ideals." In her childhood Netochka lives in the shadow of Efimov's all-consuming artistic obsession, which initially distorts her moral sensibility, but is to become the motivation for the development of a compassionate and fearless conscience bound to her own love of artistic expression. Thus Dostoevsky wished to reject both the egoism of Romanticism, as portrayed through Efimov, and the materialism of those, like Belinsky, who wished to focus only on utilitarian and practical goals to the detriment of art.

=== The woman question ===
Another subject of much discussion at the time was the place of women in society, or what became known as "the woman question". Dostoevsky's aim, unprecedented at the time in Russia, was "to depict a talented and strong-willed woman who refuses to allow herself to be crushed—who becomes the main positive heroine of a major novel", rather than merely depicting woman as the victim of injustice or iniquity. The novel was originally subtitled "The History of a Woman".
