= Prize Fighter (play) =

Play by Future D. Fidel

Prize Fighter is a play by Congolese-Australian writer Future D. Fidel.

The play concerns a talented young boxer, Isa, an orphaned Congolese refugee and former child soldier who has settled in Brisbane, confronting his past as he prepares for a national boxing title.

Prize Fighter premiered at the Roundhouse Theatre in Brisbane in September 2015, produced by La Boite Theatre Company and the Brisbane Festival. The production also played at the Belvoir St Theatre in Sydney from 6-22 January 2017, as part of the Sydney Festival.

It was nominated for Best New Australian Work, and the production Best Play, at the 2016 Helpmann Awards.

The play is published by Playlab Press.
