= Azizi Donnelly =

Lebanese actress (born 1995)

- Born: October 24th Sydney, Australia
- Occupation: Actress
- Years active: 2020–present

Azizi Donnelly is a Lebanese-Australian actress. She is best known for playing Angela Mansour in Ladies in Black.

== Early life ==
Donnelly was born in Sydney, to Lebanese parents. She moved to the U.S. when she was 18 with no job lined up and no Visa. She had many jobs before she became an actress such as a host, cleaner, Uber driver, baby sitter, personal trainer, agent, assistant and barista. She then joined Ford Models in Los Angeles.

== Career ==
Donnelly started acting at the age of 21 and had to learn the American accent. She was taking up to three acting classes at one time. Her first film role was a minor appearance in the epic historical black comedy film Babylon starring Brad Pitt and Margot Robbie. Her biggest role so far was as Angela in Ladies in Black. Donnelly has described that being on the show was like being in an indie film due to the amazing family energy.

== Personal life ==
In California, Donnelly likes to spend time at the Point Dume near Malibu, the Angeles National Forest and at Big Bear Lake.

== Filmography ==
=== Film ===
Year	Title	Role	Notes
2020	Little Nightmare	Lil Miquela	Short
2021	Tin Foil	Avi	Short
2022	Baby Powder	Rylee	Short
2022	Contrariety	Svetlana	Short
2022	Babylon	Beauty	
2023	The Student	Sarah	
2024	A Little Strange	Clementine	Short
2025	Three	Axil	Short
2025	Zero Chance	Kaiyla	Short
2025	Elvis	Veronica	
2026	Double Trouble	Sarah	

=== Television ===
Year	Title	Role	Notes
2024	Ladies in Black	Angela Mansour	6 episodes
