= The Women in Black =

Novel by Madeleine St John

- First edition
- Author: Madeleine St John
- Language: English
- Genre: Literary
- Publisher: Andre Deutsch Ltd
- Publication date: 1993
- Media type: Print Paperback
- Followed by: A Pure Clear Light

The Women in Black is a 1993 novel by Australian author Madeleine St John. It is her first novel, and is the only one she set in Australia.

== Plot summary ==
The novel tells the story of a group of department store employees in 1959 Sydney. It is set primarily during the Christmas rush period when young school leaver, Lisa, joins the women.

== Adaptations ==
In 2015, the novel was adapted to a stage musical, re-titled Ladies in Black, by Carolyn Burns with music and lyrics by Tim Finn.

The novel was also adapted into a movie in 2018, titled Ladies in Black, and directed by Australian film director Bruce Beresford. Beresford spent some 25 years trying to raise the money to make this film after securing the rights from St John, whom he had known at Sydney University in the 1960s. He reconnected with her after their mutual friend Clive James recommended the book to him.

In September 2023, it was announced the ABC had commissioned a six-part television series based on the book, which would see the women enter the sixties. In November 2023, the series was confirmed to be filming in South Australia, along with the announcement of the cast. Ladies in Black (the TV series) premiered in 2024.
