= Ann Dunnigan =

American actress

- Born: Ann Dunnigan; 17 July 1910; Hollywood, California
- Died: 5 September 1997 (aged 87); Manhattan, New York
- Occupations: Actress, teacher, translator
- Known for: Stage acting; translations of Russian literature

Ann Dunnigan Kennard (17 July 1910 – 5 September 1997) was an American actress and teacher who later became a translator of 19th-century Russian literature.

== Early stage performances ==
Born in Los Angeles County, Dunnigan spent most of her early life in San Francisco until she left California to attend Principia College in Elsah, Illinois. She then moved to New York, where she performed in two Broadway plays and a number of Off-Broadway productions.

In 1934 she played the role of Suzanne Barres in the premiere of Hatcher Hughes' three-act comedy The Lord Blesses the Bishop. The production ran from late November to December at the Adelphi Theatre in Manhattan. At the Fulton Theatre in 1938 she played Jessie Travis in Cheryl Crawford's production of All the Living, a drama that Hardie Albright adapted from Victor Small's 1935 novel, I Knew 3,000 Lunatics.

== Translation career and later years ==
After a stint as a speech teacher, her interest in the work of Anton Chekhov led her to study the Russian language. She eventually translated 26 of Chekhov's short stories and novellas, which New American Library anthologized as Anton Chekhov: Selected Stories (1960) and Ward Six and Other Stories (1965), respectively. Chekhov: The Major Plays (New American Library, 1964) compiles Dunnigan's translations of five of Chekhov's four-act plays: Ivanov, The Seagull, Uncle Vanya, Three Sisters, and The Cherry Orchard; each of these translations has been performed onstage.

Dunnigan went on to translate Fyodor Dostoyevsky, Leo Tolstoy, and Ilya Tolstoy in the late 1960s and the early 1970s. Her translations have served as the basis for numerous scholars' comments and analyses of Russian literature. Tennessee Williams regarded her rendering of The Seagull to be the best available in English, and made it the principal reference for his 1981 adaptation, The Notebook of Trigorin.

Dunnigan's rendering of War and Peace (New American Library, 1968) was the first American English edition of the novel. When WBAI in New York broadcast a live, centennial reading of the translation in 1970, Dunnigan herself joined the performance.

1972 saw the publication of two new editions: Tolstoy's Fables and Fairy Tales (New American Library) and Dostoyevsky's Netochka Nezvanova (Prentice Hall).

In 1976, the New York Shakespeare Festival commissioned Jean-Claude van Itallie to retranslate The Cherry Orchard into English. He provided them with a rendering, and the performance premiered at the Vivian Beaumont Theater in 1977. The New York Post, The New York Times, and The Village Voice praised the adaptation and the production alike; but Dunnigan contested that van Itallie's translation was nearly identical to hers, and sued him. In the settlement that followed, van Itallie accepted responsibility for the legal costs, and agreed to cease promotion of his version. Years later, van Itallie applied himself to new renderings of The Cherry Orchard, The Seagull, Three Sisters, and Uncle Vanya. In the introduction to Applause Books' 1995 compilation of these, van Itallie asserts that he "worked on The Sea Gull, and later the other three plays, with a specially-made literal English translation and a selection of French translations."

Dunnigan's final stage performance was in a staging of Sophocles' Antigone at The Public Theater, for the 1982 New York Shakespeare Festival.

She died in her Manhattan apartment in 1997.

== Published translations ==
=== Anton Chekhov ===
- Selected Stories (1960)
- The Major Plays (1964)
- Plays and Stories (1965)
- Ward Six and Other Stories (1965)

=== Fyodor Dostoyevsky ===
- Netochka Nezvanova (1970)

=== Ivan Goncharov ===
- Oblomov (1963)

=== Ilya Tolstoy ===
- Tolstoy, My Father: Reminiscences (1971)

=== Leo Tolstoy ===
- War and Peace (1968)
- Fables and Fairy Tales (1972)

== See also ==
- Rosemary Edmonds
- Constance Garnett
- Russian literature
- Anton Chekhov bibliography
- Fyodor Dostoevsky bibliography
- Leo Tolstoy bibliography
