= Gerry Ryan (businessman) =

Australian businessman

Gerry Ryan AO
- Born: Gerard Thomas Ryan; 1949 or 1950 (age 76–77); Bendigo, Victoria
- Occupations: Owner, Jayco Australia; Chairman, Global Creatures; Part-owner, Mitchelton–Scott
- Known for: Business; sports funding
- Children: 3
- Awards: Honour Roll of the Victorian Manufacturing Hall of Fame; Australian Olympic Committee Order of Merit; Victorian Caravan Industry Hall of Fame; Cycling Australia Hall of Fame

Gerard "Gerry" Thomas Ryan AO (born c. 1949) is an Australian businessman, investor, racehorse owner and sports enthusiast. Ryan is the owner and founder of Jayco Australia, as well as owning wineries, resorts, the theatrical company Global Creatures, the Southside Flyers in the Women's National Basketball League, and is part-owner of online retailer BikeExchange and My Local Group. In 2011, with his son Andrew, he acquired Mitchelton Wines from Lion Nathan.

== Career ==
Born in Bendigo, Ryan was studying accounting and took a temporary role with some friends on an assembly line at Sunwagon Camper Trailers. He went on to become foreman for the company and participated in a study tour to the US to understand more about the caravanning market. He left Sunwagon and started his caravan business in Springvale in 1975 with a loan of A$10,000. Jayco's first caravan trailer was completed in January 1976 and responded quickly to market demands by making a relatively small number of models. As of 2015, Jayco was estimated to have 45 percent of the Australian caravan market. Ryan stepped away as chief executive of the privately owned business in 2015; and remained as non-executive chairman.

== Sports ==
Ryan owned a partial interest in football club Brisbane Roar FC, which he has since sold. Along with Bart Campbell, Matt Tripp and Michael Watt, he has been one of the co-owners of NRL team Melbourne Storm since 2013, being Club Director until 2010, and has also been a board member of St Kilda Football Club in the AFL.

Ryan's interest in cycling began in 1992 when he invested in Kathy Watt, paying for her to attend the Barcelona Olympics where she won two medals. He is the part-owner and founder of Team Jayco–AlUla men's and women's professional cycling teams, formerly known as the Mitchelton–Scott team (from 2018 to 2020) and the GreenEDGE Cycling team (from 2012 to 2016), and several other minor variations in team names. Ryan was President of Cycling Australia in 2013, stepping down in 2014. It was reported that Ryan delivered Cadel Evans a yellow Cadillac following Evans' victory at the 2011 Tour de France.

As of 2013, Ryan had been a significant personal and financial supporter of women's basketball for more than 16 years with both the Dandenong Rangers in the Women's National Basketball League and the Australia women's national basketball team. In 2013, he was awarded the Australian Olympic Committee's Order of Merit for contributions to sport. In 2019, he purchased the Rangers and rebranded them as the Southside Flyers.

Ryan was half-owner of 2010 Melbourne Cup winner Americain, and remains sole owner of 2012 Bendigo Cup winner Puissance de Lune.

== Awards and honours ==
In 2000 Ryan was awarded the Medal of the Order of Australia for service to the community, particularly as a supporter of sporting and charitable organisations, and to youth. He was promoted to Officer of the Order of Australia (AO) in the 2026 Australia Day Honours for "distinguished service to sports governance, to the tourism and hospitality industry, to business, and to the community through philanthropic contributions".

Ryan was one of five inaugural inductees to the Victorian Caravan Industry Hall of Fame in 2012, and was inducted into the Victorian Government's Manufacturing Hall of Fame in 2014 for his contributions to manufacturing excellence. Ryan was awarded the Australian Olympic Committee Order of Merit in 2013 for remarkable merit in the sporting world, through his personal achievement and contribution to the development of sport. In 2015, he was an inaugural Cycling Australia Hall of Fame inductee.

In 2019, Caravan Industry Association of Australia introduced the Gerry Ryan OAM Innovation Award in recognition of his long-standing contribution to the industry.

In 2024, he was inducted into the Sport Australia Hall of Fame.

== Personal life ==
Ryan's three children are Andrew Ryan, Sarah DeBoer, and Michael Ryan.

=== Net worth ===
In 2014, the BRW Rich 200, the forerunner to the Financial Review Rich List, assessed Ryan's net worth at A$340 million. Ryan appeared on the 2017 and 2018 lists; however, he did not meet the threshold to appear on the 2019 Rich List. He met the threshold for the 2023 Rich List.

Year	Australian Financial Review Rich List		Forbes Australia's 50 Richest	
Year	Rank	Net worth (A$)	Rank	Net worth (US$)
2014	148 ▲	$340 million ▲		
2015		$355 million ▲		
2016				
2017	158 ▲	$473 million		
2018	176 ▲	$487 million ▲		
2019	n/a	unlisted		
2020	n/a	unlisted		
2021	n/a	unlisted		
2022	n/a	unlisted		
2023	199 ▲	$693 million ▲		

Legend
Icon	Description
Steady	Has not changed from the previous year
▲	Has increased from the previous year
▼	Has decreased from the previous year

== See also ==
- List of NRL club owners
