= Global Creatures =

Australian live entertainment company

- Headquarters: Sydney, Australia
- Key people: Gerry Ryan

Global Creatures is a live entertainment company based in Sydney, Australia with offices in New York and London. It is privately owned by Gerry Ryan and Carmen Pavlovic and is best known for Walking with Dinosaurs, which toured for 12 years and was seen by over 10 million people. More recently the company has become known for Moulin Rouge! The Musical which won 10 Tony Awards including Best Musical, and becoming the first Australian-produced musical to originate on Broadway.

Other productions by Global Creatures include DreamWork's How to Train Your Dragon theatrical spectacular, King Kong the Musical, Strictly Ballroom The Musical, and Muriel's Wedding The Musical.

The company has twice topped the BRW list of Australia's Highest Earning Entertainers in 2010 and 2011.

== Awards and nominations ==
=== Moulin Rouge! The Musical Original Broadway production ===
| Year | Award | Category | Nominee | Result |
|---|---|---|---|---|
| 2020 | Tony Award | Best Musical | | Won |
| 2020 | Tony Award | Best Book of a Musical | John Logan | Nominated |
| 2020 | Tony Award | Best Performance by a Leading Actor in a Musical | Aaron Tveit | Won |
| 2020 | Tony Award | Best Performance by a Leading Actress in a Musical | Karen Olivo | Nominated |
| 2020 | Tony Award | Best Performance by a Featured Actor in a Musical | Danny Burstein | Won |
| 2020 | Tony Award | Best Performance by a Featured Actor in a Musical | Sahr Ngaujah | Nominated |
| 2020 | Tony Award | Best Performance by a Featured Actress in a Musical | Robyn Hurder | Nominated |
| 2020 | Tony Award | Best Direction of a Musical | Alex Timbers | Won |
| 2020 | Tony Award | Best Choreography | Sonya Tayeh | Won |
| 2020 | Tony Award | Best Orchestrations | Justin Levine, Matt Stine, Katie Kresek and Charlie Rosen | Won |
| 2020 | Tony Award | Best Scenic Design of a Musical | Derek McLane | Won |
| 2020 | Tony Award | Best Costume Design of a Musical | Catherine Zuber | Won |
| 2020 | Tony Award | Best Lighting Design of a Musical | Justin Townsend | Won |
| 2020 | Tony Award | Best Sound Design of a Musical | Peter Hylenski | Won |
| 2020 | Drama Desk Award | Outstanding Choreography | Sonya Tayeh | Won |
| 2020 | Drama Desk Award | Outstanding Scenic Design of a Musical | Derek McLane | Won |
| 2020 | Drama Desk Award | Outstanding Costume Design of a Musical | Catherine Zuber | Won |
| 2020 | Drama Desk Award | Outstanding Lighting Design of a Musical | Justin Townsend | Won |
| 2020 | Drama Desk Award | Outstanding Sound Design of a Musical | Peter Hylenski | Won |
| 2020 | Drama League Award | Outstanding Production of a Broadway or Off-Broadway Musical | | Won |
| 2020 | Drama League Award | Distinguished Performance | Danny Burstein | Won |
| 2020 | Drama League Award | Distinguished Performance | Karen Olivo | Nominated |
| 2020 | Outer Critics Circle Award | Outstanding New Broadway Musical | | Honoree |
| 2020 | Outer Critics Circle Award | Outstanding Actor in a Musical | Aaron Tveit | Honoree |
| 2020 | Outer Critics Circle Award | Outstanding Actress in a Musical | Karen Olivo | Honoree |
| 2020 | Outer Critics Circle Award | Outstanding Featured Actor in a Musical | Danny Burstein | Honoree |
| 2020 | Outer Critics Circle Award | Outstanding Scenic Design of a Play or Musical | Derek McLane | Honoree |
| 2020 | Outer Critics Circle Award | Outstanding Costume Design of a Play or Musical | Catherine Zuber | Honoree |
| 2020 | Outer Critics Circle Award | Outstanding Lighting Design of a Play or Musical | Justin Townsend | Honoree |
| 2020 | Outer Critics Circle Award | Outstanding Sound Design of a Play or Musical | Peter Hylenski | Honoree |
| 2020 | Outer Critics Circle Award | Outstanding Director of a Musical | Alex Timbers | Honoree |
| 2020 | Outer Critics Circle Award | Outstanding Choreographer | Sonya Tayeh | Honoree |
| 2020 | Outer Critics Circle Award | Outstanding Orchestrations | Justin Levine, with Matt Stine, Katie Kresek and Charlie Rosen | Honoree |
| 2020 | Grammy Award | Best Musical Theater Album | Danny Burstein, Justin Levine, Baz Luhrmann, Tam Mutu, Sahr Ngaujah, Karen Olivo, Matt Stine, Alex Timbers and Aaron Tveit | Nominated |

=== Moulin Rouge! The Musical 2018 Boston production ===
| Year | Award | Category | Nominee | Result |
|---|---|---|---|---|
| 2019 | IRNE Awards | Best New Musical | | Won |
| 2019 | IRNE Awards | Best Musical | | Won |
| 2019 | IRNE Awards | Best Actor – Musical | Aaron Tveit | Nominated |
| 2019 | IRNE Awards | Best Actress – Musical | Karen Olivo | Nominated |
| 2019 | IRNE Awards | Best Supporting Actor – Musical | Danny Burstein | Won |
| 2019 | IRNE Awards | Best Set Design | Derek McLane | Won |
| 2019 | IRNE Awards | Best Costume Design | Catherine Zuber | Won |
| 2019 | IRNE Awards | Best Lighting Design | Justin Townsend | Nominated |
| 2019 | IRNE Awards | Best Sound Design | Peter Hylenski | Won |
| 2019 | IRNE Awards | Best Director – Musical | Alex Timbers | Nominated |
| 2019 | IRNE Awards | Best Choreography | Sonya Tayeh | Nominated |
| 2019 | IRNE Awards | Best Music Director | Cian McCarthy | Won |

=== Moulin Rouge! The Musical Original West End production ===
| Year | Award | Category | Nominee | Result |
|---|---|---|---|---|
| 2022 | Laurence Olivier Award | Best New Musical | | Nominated |
| 2022 | Laurence Olivier Award | Best Actor in a Supporting Role in a Musical | Clive Carter | Nominated |
| 2022 | Laurence Olivier Award | Best Theatre Choreographer | Sonya Tayeh | Nominated |
| 2022 | Laurence Olivier Award | Best Set Design | Derek McLane | Nominated |
| 2022 | Laurence Olivier Award | Best Costume Design | Catherine Zuber | Won |
