= The Red Devil Battery Sign =

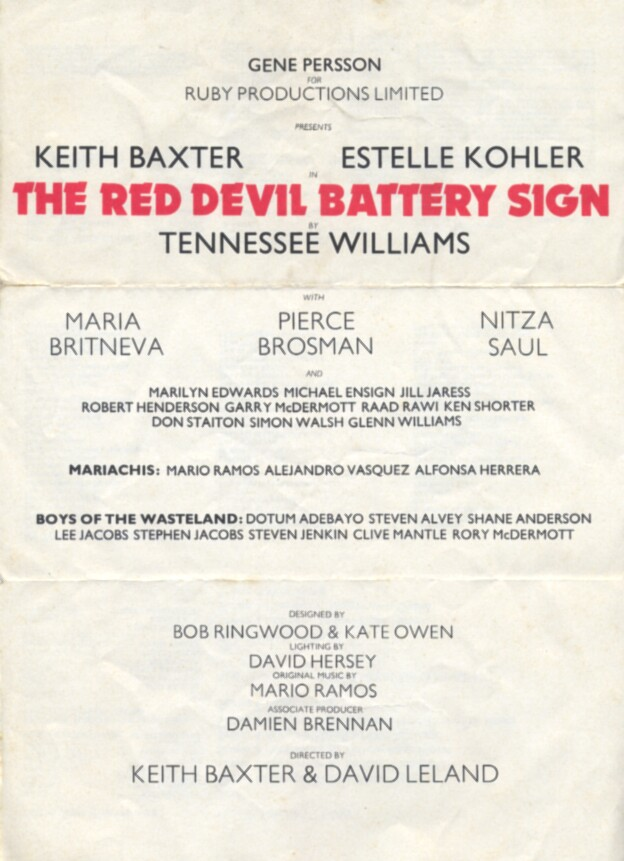
The Red Devil Battery Sign (with misspelling of the name of actor Pierce Brosnan)

The Red Devil Battery Sign is a three-act play by American writer Tennessee Williams. He copyrighted the text in 1975 for its premiere in Boston, but revised the play in 1979; that later version was published by New Directions in 1988.

== Synopsis ==
The first scene of the play is a cocktail lounge in a hotel in Dallas, soon after the 1963 assassination of President Kennedy. There is the character "Downtown Woman", the wife of a powerful business man, she has undergone electro-shock therapy, drugs, and she is being confined against her will. She meets King Del Rey, who was once the leader of a mariachi band, until he got a brain tumor. She feels that he is empathetic and might help her escape. It is revealed that the woman's father is a corrupt Texas politician, and her husband is the president of the Red Devil Battery Company. From an affair she had with a Dallas politician, she has learned things that are dangerous for her to know about the assassination, and a secret plot to overthrow the government. King hopes to get healthy and team up with his daughter, La Nina, a singer. It is too late for the two characters, King and the Woman. She is not strong enough to escape her bonds, and King's daughter, who is the lover of a gangster from Chicago, knows her father's days are numbered. King attempts to save the Woman, but he has a stroke and dies. In the end, she is grabbed by a gang of homeless young men, and taken off as the booty of their triumph, and to a world that is destroying itself.

== Production history ==
The 1975 Boston production starred Anthony Quinn (King Del Rey), Claire Bloom (Woman Downtown), Katy Jurado (Perla), Annette Cardona (La Niña) and Stephen McHattie (McCabe). It was directed by Ed Sherin and produced by David Merrick and Hilliard Elkins who was married to Bloom, although they divorced soon after the play closed. Williams was fully involved in the production during the New York City rehearsals, but in Boston he was absent part of the time. He sent in rewrites when requested. The Boston premiere received mixed reviews, but the production drew audiences; Merrick, however, insisted that the financial investment had been exhausted and he closed the show two weeks after its first preview.[2] Merrick later said:

I thought it would be killed in New York, and it was a better play by far than appeared on the stage. It wasn't my fault. It was his production. He picked the cast and the director. Anthony Quinn was all right, but Claire Bloom wasn't. The director was hopeless. It was just a very poor production, but he was determined to get it on, no matter what. Big mistake. You have to simply wait until you get the right people."

In 1977 The Red Devil Battery Sign was produced by Gene Persson at the Roundhouse Theatre in London. Williams chose Pierce Brosnan to play McCabe in the British premiere. Keith Baxter starred as King Del Rey and was also the play's co-director; Williams dedicated his 1979 revision of the play to Baxter.

The Vancouver Playhouse produced The Red Devil Battery Sign in October 1980, while Williams was writer-in-residence at the University of British Columbia. It was directed by Roger Hodgman and starred Diane D'Aquila (Woman Downtown) and Richard Donat (King Del Rey).

In 1996, The Red Devil Battery Sign was produced at the WPA Theater in New York.
