= Madeleine St John =

Australian writer (1941 – 2006)

- Born: November 12, 1941; Sydney, New South Wales, Australia
- Died: 18 June 2006 (aged 64); London, England
- Writing career
- Language: English
- Years active: 1993-1999
- Notable works: The Women in Black; The Essence of the Thing

Madeleine St John (12 November 1941 – 18 June 2006) was an Australian writer, the first Australian woman to be shortlisted for the Booker Prize for Fiction (in 1997 for her novel The Essence of the Thing).

== Biography ==
St John was born in 1941 in Castlecrag, a suburb of Sydney, and schooled at Queenwood School for Girls, Mosman. She was born to Edward St John, a Queen's Counsel, the son of a Church of England clergyman. Her French mother, Sylvette (Cargher), died by suicide when St John was 12. Her maternal grandparents were Romanian Jews.

She went the University of Sydney to study arts where she was a contemporary of Bruce Beresford, John Bell, Clive James, Germaine Greer, Arthur Dignam, Robert Hughes and Richard Walsh, whom her father defended in the first Oz obscenity trial in 1964.

She married Christopher Tillam, a filmmaker, with whom she moved to San Francisco to live while he studied film. The marriage ended after St John went to live in England during 1968, where she remained. She took a series of jobs in bookshops and offices. Eventually she stuck with a part-time job for two days a week at an antique shop in Kensington. During the following eight years she attempted to write a biography of Helena Blavatsky but was dissatisfied and destroyed the manuscript.

In the early 1990s she decided to write novels. Her first, The Women in Black was published in 1993.

Not used to the success her writing brought, she remained a very private person, almost reclusive in style if not in actuality. She died aged 64 at St Mary's Hospital, London, of emphysema and was cremated at Kensal Green Cemetery.

A biography Madeleine: A Life of Madeleine St John, written by Helen Trinca, was published by Text Publishing in 2013.

== Writing career ==
She wrote four novels. The first one, The Women in Black, published in 1993 and re-released in 2009, is a comedy of manners set in a department store in her native Sydney during the 1950s and the only one of her novels to be set in Australia. It was adapted into the 2015 musical Ladies in Black by Tim Finn and Carolyn Burns. Under Australian director, Bruce Beresford the book has been made into a film, Ladies in Black, released in Australia September 2018. In 2018 the book was republished as Ladies in Black. In 2024 the TV series Ladies in Black premiered in Australia. Her other three are a kind of trilogy based in London's Notting Hill, where she lived. The Essence of the Thing (1997) was short-listed for the Man Booker Prize. She was working on a new novel when she died.

Beresford writes that "a major strength of her writing was the accumulation of minutiae". He says that "she was so furious over some minor point in a French translation of one of her novels that she refused to allow it to appear. Kamikaze-like, she stipulated in her will that there were to be no translations of her novels into any language".

== Works ==
- The Women in Black (1993)
- A Pure Clear Light (1996)
- The Essence of the Thing (1997)
- A Stairway to Paradise (1999)
