= Roger Hodgman =

Australian stage and television director (born 1943)

Roger Hodgman AM
- Born: 1 December 1943 (age 81); Hobart, Tasmania, Australia
- Occupation: Theatre director
- Years active: 1965–present
- Spouse: Pamela Rabe (m. 1984)

Roger Hodgman AM (born 1 December 1943) is an Australian stage and television director.

He was educated at the Hutchins School and the University of Tasmania, where he graduated with a Bachelor of Arts in English and Political Science in 1966, and an Honours degree in History in 1972. After beginning his career as a television director with the ABC in 1965, Hodgman worked in London between 1971 and 1977 where he taught acting at East 15 Acting School. He worked in Canada from 1977 to 1983, including as Artistic Director of the Vancouver Playhouse for three years from 1978 to 1981 where he collaborated with Tennessee Williams on productions of Williams' later plays The Red Devil Battery Sign and The Notebook of Trigorin.

In 1983 Hodgman relocated to Australia with actress Pamela Rabe and became Dean of the School of Drama at the Victorian College of the Arts in Melbourne, establishing more orthodox acting training than under his predecessor Peter Oyston. He became Associate Director of the Melbourne Theatre Company in 1984, was appointed joint Artistic Director in 1986, and held the position of Artistic Director from 1988 to 1999. He has since directed plays, operas, musicals and television in Australia, Canada, New Zealand and Japan.

His awards include a Helpmann Award for Best Direction of a Musical for Grey Gardens (for The Production Company) and Green Room Awards for Best Director for Who’s Afraid of Virginia Woolf? and A Little Night Music (for Melbourne Theatre Company).

Hodgman was appointed a Member of the Order of Australia in the 2023 King's Birthday Honours "significant service to the performing arts as a director".
