= Sydney Lyric =

Theatre in Sydney, Australia

Coordinates: 33°52′07″S 151°11′45″E

- Sydney Lyric Theatre
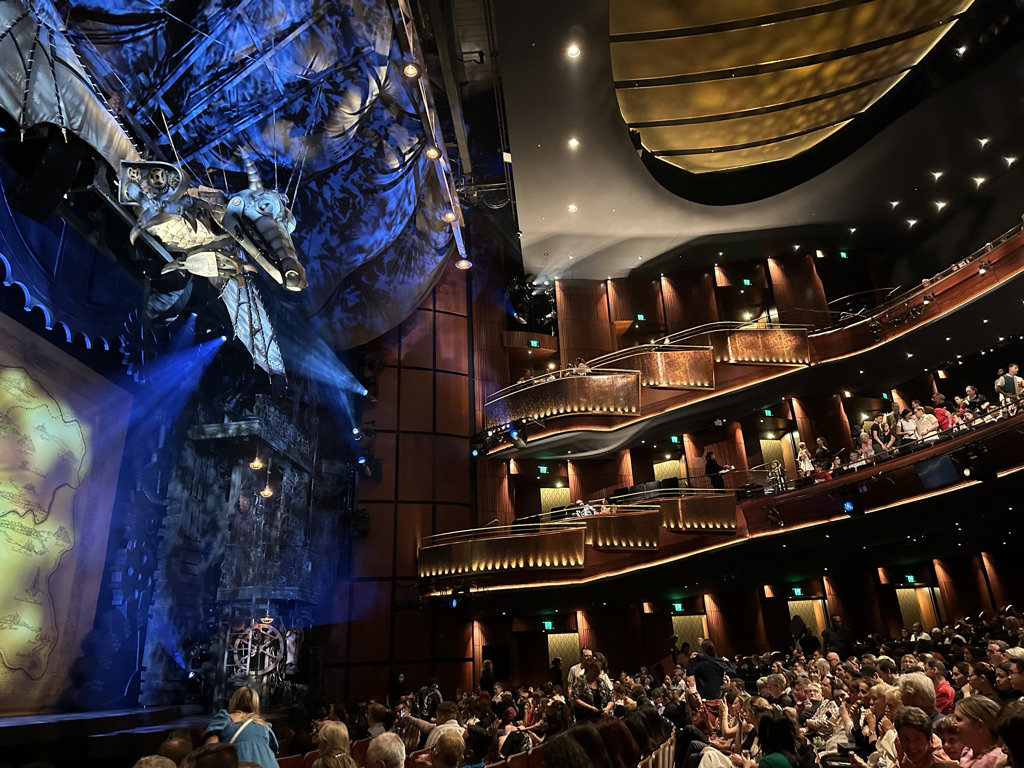
- Interior
- Interactive map of Sydney Lyric
- Address: 55 Pirrama Road, Pyrmont; Sydney; Australia
- Owner: Foundation Theatres
- Capacity: 2,005 seats
- Type: Theatre
- Public transit: The Star Light Rail

Construction
- Opened: 1997

Website
- www.sydneylyric.com.au

Sydney Lyric is a theatre in Sydney, New South Wales, Australia. It is part of The Star complex. The theatre is used for large scale musicals, theatre productions, concerts, opera and ballet. Formerly the Lyric Theatre, the venue changed to its current name in late 2011.

The theatre has been owned and operated by Foundation Theatres Pty Limited (formerly Foundation Entertainment Group) since October 2011, which also owns Sydney's Capitol Theatre.

In February 2017, the Sydney Lyric underwent a $18 million auditorium upgrade, including movable walls that alter the theatre's seating capacity from 1,350 up to 2,010 seats. These works completed the upgrade of the whole theatre, encompassing foyers, bars & box office which were completed in 2014.

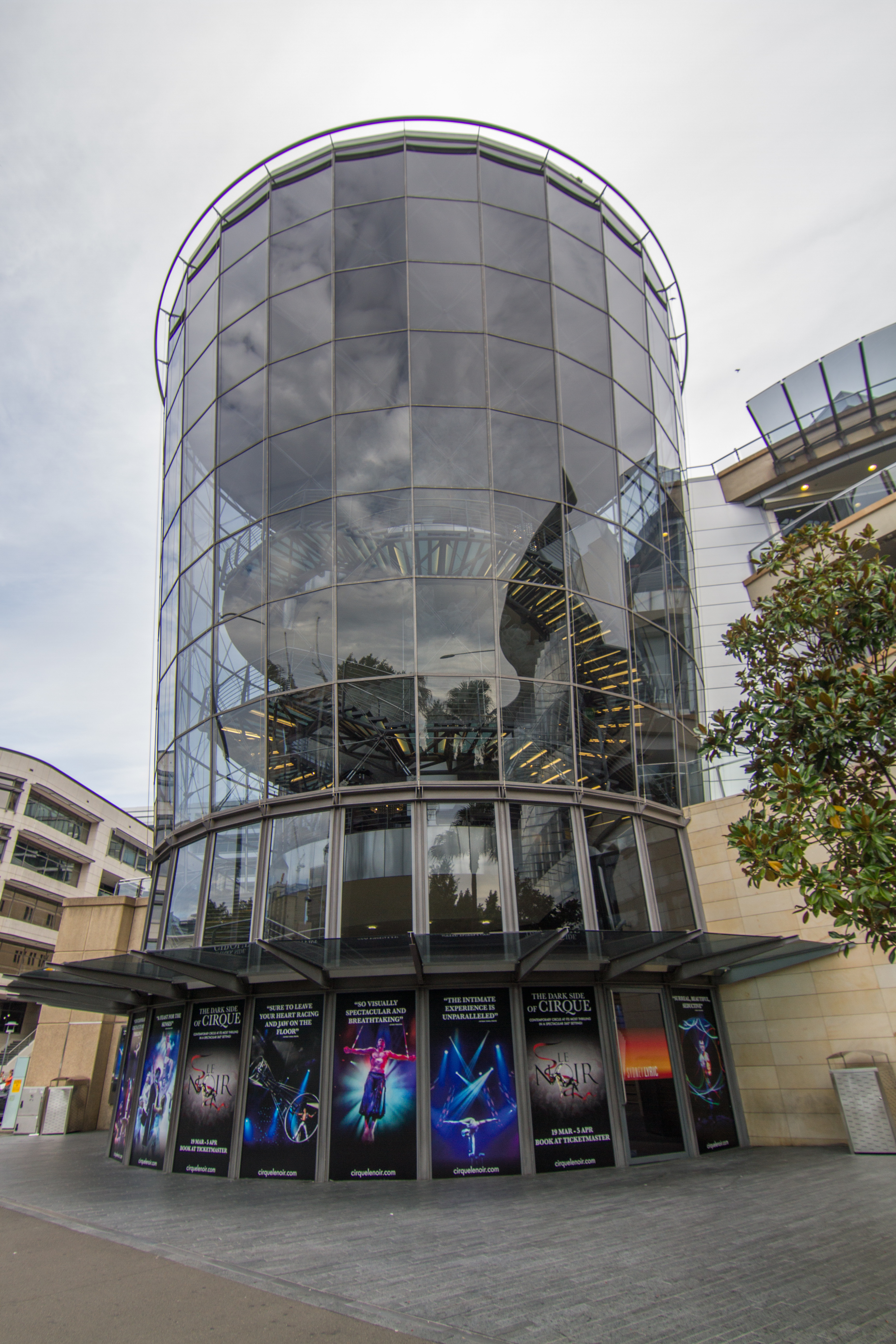
Main entrance

== Notable performances ==
The theatre was built as part of the casino complex initially known as Star City and now as The Star, and first opened in September 1997 with its first act being Michael Crawford and has since then played most to many well known musicals and entertainers.

Performances include:

- 2027 – Moulin Rouge!, Matilda the Musical
- 2026 – Anastasia, Cirque Alice, Nikos Oikonomopoulos, A Beautiful Noise
- 2025 – MJ the Musical, Back to the Future
- 2024 – Hamilton, & Juliet
- 2023 – Wicked, Mamma Mia!, Tick, Tick… Boom!, Hairspray
- 2022 – Rodger + Hammerstein's Cinderella, Mary Poppins
- 2021 – Hamilton
- 2020 – Pippin, The Secret Garden †, 9 To 5 †, War Horse, Shrek the Musical
- 2019 – Billy Elliot, Muriel's Wedding, Saturday Night Fever, Peter Pan Goes Wrong
- 2018 – The Book Of Mormon (2018–2019)
- 2017 – Beautiful: The Carole King Musical, The Bodyguard
- 2016 – Dream Lover (world premiere), Singin' in the Rain, We Will Rock You
- 2015 – Matilda the Musical (Australian premiere), The Rocky Horror Show, Le Noir - The Dark Side of Cirque, Thriller - Live
- 2014 – Strictly Ballroom (world premiere), Dirty Dancing
- 2013 – War Horse, Hot Shoe Shuffle, Blue Man Group, Grease
- 2012 – Legally Blonde the Musical (Australian premiere). An Officer and a Gentleman (world premiere), Frankie Valli & the Four Seasons
- 2011 – Annie (2011–12), Richard III starring Kevin Spacey, Elton John Live, An Evening with Al Pacino, Stevie Wonder Live, Hairspray, Doctor Zhivago (world premiere), The Music of Andrew Lloyd Webber
- 2010 – Cats, West Side Story
- 2009 – Mamma Mia, Chicago, Buddy
- 2008 – Priscilla Queen of the Desert, The Phantom of the Opera, Shout!
- 2007 – Miss Saigon
- 2006 – Priscilla Queen of the Desert (world premiere 2006–07), Dusty
- 2005 – The Producers
- 2004 – We Will Rock You (2004–05), Lisa Marie Presley, Cirque Dreams, Shanghai Circus, Sleeping Beauty on Ice, Saturday Night Fever
- 2003 – The Lion, the Witch & the Wardrobe
- 2002 – Mamma Mia, Oliver, Pirates of Penzance
- 2001 – The Wizard of Oz, Hale and Pace, Singin' in the Rain, Michael Ball, Petula Clark
- 2000 – Annie, Tony Bennett, Jerry Lewis, Al Jarreau, Peter Ustinov
- 1999 – The Merry Widow, Geraldine Turner, Kamahl, Adam Brand, Popcorn, Tony Bennett, The Sound of Music
- 1998 – Julio Iglesias, An Ideal Husband, Show Boat
- 1997 – Michael Crawford, Natalie Cole, Peter, Paul and Mary, Elisa Chan, Kenny Gee, K.D. Lang, Air Supply

Indicates current production
† Indicates the production was cancelled due to indoor event restrictions as part of the COVID-19 outbreak

== Foundry Theatre ==
The Foundry Theatre is located within the Sydney Lyric theatre, created through repurposing its under-utilised rear dock. The 360 seat (or 630 standing) venue opened in February 2025 with a limited season of performances by Tim Minchin, with his week-long run titled First at the Foundry.

== Local area ==
The Sydney Lyric theatre is located in The Star casino complex, which is in the suburb of Pyrmont, an inner-city suburb of Sydney in the state of New South Wales, Australia. Pyrmont is located 2 kilometres south-west of the Sydney central business district in the local government area of the City of Sydney. It is also part of the Darling Harbour district. Pyrmont was once a vital component of Sydney's industrial waterfront, with wharves, shipbuilding yards, factories and woolstores. As industry moved out, the population and the area declined. In recent years it has experienced redevelopment with an influx of residents and office workers.
