= Gabriela Tylesova =

Gabriela Tylesova is a set and costume designer for theatre, dance, ballet, events and opera.

Born in the Czech Republic, Tylesova came to Australia in 1996. She studied at the National Institute of Dramatic Art (NIDA) in Sydney.

One of Tylesova's first major jobs after graduating was designing costumes for a production of Donizetti's comic opera The Elixir of Love directed by Simon Phillips for Opera Australia. She has since collaborated with Phillips on numerous works including the Australian production of Andrew Lloyd Webber's musical Love Never Dies for which she designed the set and costumes.

Tylesova has received multiple Helpmann Awards for her set and costume designs.
