= Grinspoon discography =

- Studio albums: 8
- Extended plays: 4
- Compilation albums: 2
- Singles: 29
- Video albums: 2

The discography of Grinspoon, an Australian rock band formed in 1995, consists of eight studio albums, two compilation albums, four extended plays and twenty-nine singles.

== Albums ==
=== Studio albums ===
Title	Album details	Peak chart positions	Certifications (sales thresholds)
Title	Album details	AUS	Certifications (sales thresholds)
Guide to Better Living	Released: 16 September 1997; Label: Universal	8 (Note: Guide to Better Living reached a higher peak of number 8 upon being re-released in 2017.)	ARIA: 2× Platinum
Easy	Released: 15 November 1999; Label: Universal	4	ARIA: Platinum
New Detention	Released: 3 June 2002; Label: Universal	2	ARIA: 2× Platinum
Thrills, Kills & Sunday Pills	Released: 20 September 2004; Label: Universal	4	ARIA: Platinum
Alibis & Other Lies	Released: 21 July 2007; Label: Universal	2	ARIA: Gold
Six to Midnight	Released: 11 September 2009; Label: Chk Chk Boom	4	
Black Rabbits	Released: 28 September 2012; Label: Universal	8	
Whatever, Whatever	Released: 9 August 2024; Label: Grinspoon, Universal	3	

=== Compilation albums ===
Title	Album details	Peak chart positions	Certifications
Title	Album details	AUS	Certifications
Best in Show	Released: 7 November 2005; Label: Universal	12	ARIA: Gold
Chemical Hearts	Released: 11 October 2019; Label: Universal	9	

=== Video albums ===
Title	Album details	Peak chart positions	Certifications
Title	Album details	AUS	Certifications
66.6	Released: 2000; Label: Grudge; Format: VHS	-	
23 Hours of Waiting Around	Released: 24 October 2003; Label: Universal; Format: DVD	10	ARIA: Gold

== Extended plays ==
Title	Details	Peak chart positions	Certifications
Title	Details	AUS	Certifications
Grinspoon	Released: 1995; Label: Oracle Records; Also known as The Green EP	—	
Licker Bottle Cozy	Released: December 1996; Label: Universal	65	
Pushing Buttons	Released: September 1998; Label: Universal	13	ARIA: Gold
Panic Attack	Released: March 2003; Label: Universal	13	

== Singles ==
Year	Title	Peak chart positions	Album
Year	Title	AUS	Album
1997	"Pedestrian"	54	Guide to Better Living
1997	"DC×3"	50	Guide to Better Living
1997	"Repeat"	77	Guide to Better Living
1998	"Just Ace"	25	Guide to Better Living
1998	"Don't Go Away"	84	Guide to Better Living
1999	"Ready 1"	36	Easy
2000	"Secrets"	83	Easy
2000	"Rock Show"	78	Easy
2000	"Violent and Lazy"	—	Easy
2002	"Chemical Heart"	25	New Detention
2002	"Lost Control"	29	New Detention
2002	"No Reason"	62	New Detention
2003	"1000 Miles"	73	New Detention
2004	"Hard Act to Follow"	24	Thrills, Kills & Sunday Pills
2004	"Better Off Alone"	30	Thrills, Kills & Sunday Pills
2005	"Hold on Me"	44	Thrills, Kills & Sunday Pills
2005	"Bleed You Dry"	67	Thrills, Kills & Sunday Pills
2005	"Sweet as Sugar"	—	Best in Show
2007	"Black Tattoo"	45	Alibis & Other Lies
2007	"What You Got"	—	Alibis & Other Lies
2007	"Minute by Minute"	—	Alibis & Other Lies
2009	"Comeback"	48	Six to Midnight
2009	"Summer"	—	Six to Midnight
2010	"Premonitions"	—	Six to Midnight
2012	"Passerby"	92	Black Rabbits
2013	"Branded"	—	Black Rabbits
2024	"Unknown Pretenders"	—	Whatever, Whatever
2024	"Never Say Never"	—	Whatever, Whatever
2024	"The Only One"	—	Whatever, Whatever
2025	"Chemical Heart (Geed Up)" (with Bliss n Eso)	—	The Moon (The Dark Side)

== Other appearances ==
List of other non-single song appearances
Title	Year	Album
"Snap Your Fingers, Snap Your Neck"	1998	ECW: Extreme Music
"Not Pretty Enough"	2002	Andrew Denton's Musical Challenge Volume 3: Third Time Lucky!
"The Drugs Don't Work"	2005	Like A Version: Volume One
"Saturday Night"	2007	Standing on the Outside
"Boys in Town"	2007	No Man's Woman
"St. Louis"	2008	Easy Fever - A Tribute to The Easybeats and Stevie Wright
"When You Were Mine"	2010	Like A Version: Volume Six
"Get Out"	2018	Like A Version: Volume Fourteen
