= Best in Show (Grinspoon album) =

Compilation album by Grinspoon
- Released: 7 November 2005
- Recorded: (1996–2005)
- Genre: Post-grunge, alternative metal
- Length: 51:15
- Label: Universal
- Producer: Phil McKellar, Grinspoon, Ulrich Wild, Ramesh Sathiah, Jonathon Burnside, Howard Benson

Grinspoon chronology
Thrills, Kills & Sunday Pills (2004)	Best in Show (2005)	Alibis & Other Lies (2007)

Singles from Best in Show
- 1. "Sweet as Sugar" Released: October 2005

Best in Show is a compilation album by Australian post-grunge band Grinspoon. The album was released on 7 November 2005 to coincide with the ten-year anniversary of the band. The album peaked at No. 12 on the ARIA Albums Chart and was certified Gold. The first track, "Sweet as Sugar", was specially recorded for this album and, appropriately, is a return to the earlier style of the band. The rest of the tracks are listed chronologically, from "Champion", recorded in 1996, to "Hard Act to Follow", recorded in 2004. The liner notes contain photography of the band from their beginnings to the present, and details the history of the band in the form of a fairy tale about the 'Knights of Grinspoon' from the 'Land of Oz'. The limited edition bonus disc includes a collection of covers recorded over the years.

== Track listing ==
All tracks are written by Phil Jamieson and Pat Davern, unless otherwise shown

No.	Title	Original release	Length
1.	"Sweet As Sugar"	Previously Unreleased	3:16
2.	"Champion" (Joe Hansen, Jamieson)	Licker Bottle Cozy & Guide to Better Living	2:43
3.	"DC×3"	Guide to Better Living	2:56
4.	"Post Enebriated Anxiety"	Licker Bottle Cozy & Guide to Better Living	2:39
5.	"Just Ace" (Jamieson)	Guide to Better Living	1:49
6.	"More Than You Are"	Pushing Buttons	3:12
7.	"Black Friday"	Pushing Buttons	2:30
8.	"Secrets"	Easy	3:08
9.	"Rock Show"	Easy	4:08
10.	"Ready 1"	Easy	2:36
11.	"1000 Miles" (Jamieson)	New Detention	2:23
12.	"No Reason" (Jamieson, Nick Wright)	New Detention	3:51
13.	"Lost Control"	New Detention	3:32
14.	"Chemical Heart"	New Detention	4:41
15.	"Bleed You Dry" (Jamieson, Hansen)	Thrills, Kills & Sunday Pills	3:29
16.	"Hold on Me"	Thrills, Kills & Sunday Pills	2:47
17.	"Better Off Alone" (Jamieson, Davern, Scott Russo)	Thrills, Kills & Sunday Pills	3:56
18.	"Hard Act to Follow"	Thrills, Kills & Sunday Pills	3:33
Total length:			51:15

Limited edition bonus disc
No.	Title	Original version	Length
1.	"Don't Change" (Garry Gary Beers, Andrew Farriss, Jon Farriss, Tim Farriss, Michael Hutchence, Kirk Pengilly)	Panic Attack (EP)	3:53
2.	"And I Heard the Fire Sing" (Robert John Taylor)	Dirty Deeds (soundtrack)	3:01
3.	"Snap Your Fingers, Snap Your Neck" (Tommy Victor, Ted Parsons)	Pushing Buttons	4:28
4.	"I Was a Kamikaze Pilot" (Dave Faulkner)		3:15
5.	"Take a Long Line" (Bernard Neeson, Richard Brewster-Jones, John Brewster-Jones)	Sample People (soundtrack)	3:10
6.	"Don't Wanna Be the One" (Martin Rotsey, Peter Gifford, Rob Hirst, Jim Moginie, Peter Garrett)	The Power & the Passion... A Tribute to Midnight Oil	3:20
Total length:			21:07

== Charts ==
=== Weekly charts ===
Chart (2005/06)	Peak position
Australian Albums (ARIA)	12

=== Year-end charts ===
Chart (2005)	Position
Australian Albums Chart	96

== Certifications ==
Region	Certification	Certified units/sales
Australia (ARIA)	Gold	35,000^{^}
^{^} Shipments figures based on certification alone.
