= Chemical Hearts (album) =

Compilation album by Grinspoon
- Released: 11 October 2019
- Label: Universal

Grinspoon chronology
Black Rabbits (2012)	Chemical Hearts (2019)	Whatever, Whatever (2024)

Chemical Hearts is a compilation album by Australian post-grunge band Grinspoon. The album was announced in June 2019 and released on vinyl only on 11 October 2019. It peaked at No. 9 on the ARIA Albums Chart.

The album was supported with the Chemical Hearts National Tour, across October and November 2019.

== Track listing ==
Side A
No.	Title	original album	Length
1.	"Chemical Heart"	New Detention	4:41
2.	"DC×3"	Guide to Better Living	2:56
3.	"Champion"	Licker Bottle Cozy	2:43
4.	"Just Ace"	Guide to Better Living	1:49
5.	"Pedestrian"	Guide to Better Living	2:16
6.	"Black Friday"	Pushing Buttons	2:30
7.	"Ready 1"	Easy	2:36
8.	"Lost Control"	New Detention	3:32

Side B
No.	Title	original album	Length
1.	"Hard Act to Follow"	Thrills, Kills & Sunday Pills	3:33
2.	"No Reason"	New Detention	3:51
3.	"Sickest"	Guide to Better Living	3:12
4.	"More Than You Are"	Pushing Buttons	3:12
5.	"1000 Miles"	New Detention	2:23
6.	"Better Off Alone"	Thrills, Kills & Sunday Pills	3:56
7.	"Post Enebriated Anxiety"	Licker Bottle Cozy	2:39

== Charts ==
Chart (2019)	Peak position
Australian Albums (ARIA)	9
