= Just Ace =

Single by Grinspoon

from the album Guide to Better Living
- Released: 1 February 1998
- Recorded: February 1997
- Genre: Alternative metal, post-grunge, ska punk
- Length: 1:46
- Label: Grudge/Universal Music Australia
- Songwriter(s): Pat Davern, Phil Jamieson
- Producer(s): Phillip McKellar

Grinspoon singles chronology
"'Repeat'" (1997)	"Just Ace" (1998)	"'Don't Go Away'" (1998)

"Just Ace" is the fourth single released by Australian rock band Grinspoon, from their debut album, Guide to Better Living. It peaked at No. 25 on the ARIA Singles Chart, remaining in the charts for fifteen weeks. It also reached No. 18 on Triple J's Hottest 100 in 1998.

"Just Ace" was written by band members Phil Jamieson and Pat Davern. "Just Ace" was recorded at Rocking Horse Studios in February 1997. The B-sides were recorded at Grudgefest in Sydney on Saturday 27 September 1997.

== Track listing ==
No.	Title	Writer(s)	Length
1.	"Just Ace"	Phil Jamieson, Pat Davern	1:46
2.	"Grudgefest intro"		0:34
3.	"More Than You Are" (live)		2:55
4.	"Freezer" (live)		2:03
5.	"Post Enebriated Anxiety" (live)		3:13
6.	"N. B. T." (live)		2:49
7.	"Just Ace" (live)		2:02
Total length:			15:24

== Charts ==
Chart (1998)	Peak position
Australia (ARIA)	25

== Personnel ==
Grinspoon members

- Phil Jamieson – vocals, guitar
- Pat Davern – guitar
- Joe Hansen – bass guitar
- Kristian Hopes – drums

Production details

- Recording Engineer – Greg Courtney (track 1), Rob Taylor (tracks 2–7)
- Mastering – Don Bartley
- Mixing – Phillip McKellar (track 1), Rob Taylor (tracks 2–7)
- Producer – Phil McKellar, Grinspoon – Producer
- Studio – Rocking Horse Studios
