= Sweet as Sugar =

Single by Grinspoon

from the album Best in Show
- Released: October 2005
- Recorded: 2005
- Genre: Post-grunge
- Length: 3:16
- Label: Universal Music Australia
- Songwriters: Pat Davern, Phil Jamieson

Grinspoon singles chronology
"'Bleed You Dry'" (2005)	"Sweet as Sugar" (2005)	"'Black Tattoo'" (2007)

"Sweet as Sugar" is the only single released by Australian rock band Grinspoon from their compilation album Best In Show. It was released in October 2005 as a digital download by Universal Music Australia. The song reached number 42 on the Triple J's Hottest 100 for 2005.

The band's bass player, Joe Hansen, describes the song as a "pretty-straight-ahead, good rockin' tune."

== Reception ==
Australian music website Faster Louder described "Sweet as Sugar" as reminiscent of Thrills, Kills & Sunday Pills with its pop/rock sound. The review states that it "isn’t a slow song and is full of that constant bass guitar strum and hammering drums that we have all come to associate with Grinspoon, and is without those screaming vocals from Phil Jamieson but still maintains a strong and steady performance." It concludes, "It’s one of those infectious songs that stays in your head after you hear it, where you will find yourself constantly singing the chorus."

Rob Smith of The Dwarf is more critical, stating that "Sweet as Sugar" "is not as the name suggests" and that it "fails to stand out in the crowd of Grinspoon hits that proceed it."

== Music video ==
The music video for "Sweet as Sugar" was directed by James Barr and produced by James Moore.

== Track listing ==
All tracks are written by Phil Jamieson, Pat Davern

Digital single
No.	Title	Length
1.	"Sweet as Sugar"	3:16
