= Secrets (Grinspoon song) =

Single by Grinspoon

from the album Easy
- Released: January 2000
- Recorded: September 1999
- Genre: Alternative metal, post-grunge
- Length: 3:05
- Label: Universal Records
- Songwriter(s): Phil Jamieson, Pat Davern
- Producer(s): Jonathon Burnside

Grinspoon singles chronology
"'Ready 1'" (1999)	"Secrets" (2000)	"'Rock Show'" (2000)

"Secrets" was the second single by Grinspoon which was released from their second studio album Easy. It was released in January 2000 on the Grudge label (the Australian imprint of Universal Records), reaching No. 83 on the Australian Singles Chart and polling at No. 73 on Triple J's Hottest 100 for 2000.

The song is played in dropped B tuning and is counted by fans as their best song from the Easy album. The video shows Phil Jamieson, who suffered a breakup, planning to rob a pawn shop. Two versions were made for the video, with one showing the band members shooting guns in the beginning.

== Track listing ==
All tracks are written by Phil Jamieson and Pat Davern, except as shown

CD single
No.	Title	Length
1.	"Secrets"	3:06
2.	"Tang (Rosen Mix)" (Phil Jamieson (Remix by DJ Lance))	4:07
3.	"Secrets" (Demo)	3:02
4.	"Tang (Dark Matter Remix)" (Pat Davern (Remix by DJ Ammo))	4:09
