= Violent and Lazy =

Single by Grinspoon

from the album Easy
- Released: 13 November 2000
- Recorded: September 1999
- Genre: Alternative metal Post-grunge
- Length: 3:27
- Label: Grudge/Universal
- Songwriter(s): Phil Jamieson
- Producer(s): Jonathon Burnside

Grinspoon singles chronology
"'Rock Show'" (2000)	"Violent and Lazy" (2000)	"'Chemical Heart'" (2002)

"Violent and Lazy" is the fourth single by Grinspoon from their second studio album Easy. It was released on 13 November 2000 on the Grudge label (the Australian imprint of Universal Records), which peaked at No. 15 on the ARIA Alternative Singles Chart.

Grinspoon guitarist Pat Davern describes the song as being "probably the least heavy song on Easy. We thought we’d release three really rock singles off the record first. This one’s maybe a bit more positive than the other, dirtier songs." The band's drummer, Kristian Hopes, however describes it as being one "of the heavier songs on the album". Sputnik Music said that "Violent And Lazy shows the ability of the Spoon to write a marketable, catchy Rock song".

"Violent and Lazy" was the only single which did not appear on the band's 2005 compilation album, Best in Show. The single includes tracks remixed by Ben Rosen, "Better off Dead"; Gerling, "Violent and Lazy (Hey Kids Do You Love Jesus?)"; Jonathan Burnside, "Violent and Lazy (Burnside Remix)"; and Jonboyrock, "Ready 1 (Jonboyrock Remix).

== Track listing ==
All tracks are written by Phil Jamieson, except as shown

CD single
No.	Title	Length
1.	"Violent and Lazy"	3:27
2.	"Better Off Dead (Better Off Remixed)" (Remix by Ben Rosen)	4:18
3.	"Violent and Lazy (Hey Kids Do You Love Jesus Remix)" (Remix by Gerling)	3:32
4.	"Violent and Lazy (Burnside Remix)" (Remix by Jonathon Burnside)	4:09
5.	"Ready 1 (Jonboyrock Remix)" (Pat Davern, P Jamieson)	4:46
