= Alibis & Other Lies =

Studio album by Grinspoon
- Released: 21 July 2007 (Australia)
- Recorded: 2006–2007
- Genres: Post-grunge, alternative rock, blues rock, glam metal
- Label: Universal Music
- Producers: Ramesh Sathiah, Grinspoon

Grinspoon chronology
Best in Show (2005)	Alibis & Other Lies (2007)	Six to Midnight (2009)

Singles from Alibis & Other Lies
- 1. "Black Tattoo" Released: 30 June 2007; 2. "What You Got" Released: 15 September 2007; 3. "Minute by Minute" Released: 8 December 2007

Alibis & Other Lies is the fifth studio album by Grinspoon, which was released 21 July 2007. The first single from the album is Black Tattoo, being released as a digital download on 23 June and on Single 30 June 2007. Ramesh Sathiah, producer of Green Album and Licker Bottle Cozy, is producing the album. "Black Tattoo" is more similar to songs from Guide to Better Living than the songs off their last album, but the rest of the songs range from AC/DC-esque rockers like "Choirboy" to country rock songs like "Find Your Own Way", to glam metal songs like "Carried Away" and to soft rock songs like "Minute by Minute".

This was their final album under their current contract with Universal Music Australia. The album sessions were delayed during February to April as Phil Jamieson was in rehabilitation due to addiction to crystal methamphetamines.

During that short time, the band's webpage was replaced with a video of Jamieson in suspenders, doing vocal takes for "Black Tattoo" and a countdown to when the album was supposed to come out.

At the J Awards of 2007, the album was nominated for Australian Album of the Year.

== Reception ==
Professional ratings
Review scores
Source	Rating
Allmusic	2/5 stars

Despite the band's claims that Alibis and Other Lies was to be similar to their hard-rocking debut album, Guide to Better Living, the album actually contains songs of various genres, which failed to appeal to Grinspoon's core fanbase. Reviews for the album were mostly mixed, with some of its more negative reviews being extremely so. For example, Allmusic called it "a peculiar side trip for a band who used to have more in common with the musical likes of Rage Against the Machine", and gave the album a rating of only two stars out of five.

== Track listing ==
All songs written by Phil Jamieson & Pat Davern, except where noted.

1. "Black Tattoo" – 2:49
2. "Choirboy" (Jamieson) – 4:11
3. "Carried Away" – 3:04
4. "Minute by Minute" (Jamieson) – 4:07
5. "Outside Looking In" – 3:41
6. "Business = Pleasure" (Hansen, Jamieson) – 3:23
7. "What You Got" (Strong, Jamieson) – 2:52
8. "Leave It" (Jamieson) – 3:39
9. "Living in the City" – 3:39
10. "Melted Holiday" (Strong, Jamieson) – 3:46
11. "Gun for Hire" (Hansen, Jamieson) – 3:32
12. "Find Your Own Way" – 4:30
13. "Got to Get Away" – 3:10 (iTunes bonus track)

== Charts ==
=== Weekly charts ===
Chart (2007)	Peak position
Australian Albums (ARIA)	2

=== Year-end charts ===
Chart (2007)	Position
Australian Artist Albums Chart	44

== Certifications ==
Region	Certification	Certified units/sales
Australia (ARIA)	Gold	35,000^{^}
^{^} Shipments figures based on certification alone.
