= Lost Control (Grinspoon song) =

Single by Grinspoon

from the album New Detention
- Released: 12 May 2002
- Recorded: 2001–2002
- Genre: Alternative metal, post-grunge
- Length: 3:29
- Label: Universal
- Songwriter(s): Pat Davern, Phil Jamieson
- Producer(s): Phil McKeller

Grinspoon singles chronology
| "Chemical Heart" (2002) | "Lost Control" (2002) | "No Reason" (2002) |

"Lost Control" is a song by Grinspoon. It was released on 12 May 2002, as the second single from their third studio album, New Detention, and peaked at No. 29 on the ARIA Singles Chart. It also reached No. 14 on Triple J's Hottest 100 in 2002. The video shows a woman driving to a Grinspoon concert at Bondi beach, where the fans cause chaos. It is the official theme song for AFL Live 2004.

== Track listing ==
1. "Lost Control" (Edit)
2. "All Good"
3. "Violent and Lazy" (Terrahammer remix)
4. "Lost Control" (Phil McKellar dirty remix)

== Charts ==
| Chart (2002) | Peak position |
|---|---|
| Australia (ARIA) | 29 |
