= Black Tattoo =

Single by Grinspoon

from the album Alibis & Other Lies
- Released: 30 June 2007
- Recorded: 2006
- Genre: Alternative metal; post-grunge
- Length: 2:48
- Label: Grudge (Universal)
- Songwriter(s): Pat Davern, Phil Jamieson
- Producer(s): Ramesh Sathiah, Grinspoon

Grinspoon singles chronology
"'Sweet As Sugar'" (2005)	"Black Tattoo" (2007)	"'What You Got'" (2007)

"Black Tattoo" is the first single by Australian rock band Grinspoon from their fifth studio album, Alibis & Other Lies. It was released on 30 June 2007 on the Grudge label (the Australian imprint of Universal Records), debuting at No. 45 on the ARIA Singles Chart. The song also polled at No. 72 on Triple J's Hottest 100 for 2007. The video shows the band being dragged along a prairie while one of the members drives the car that's dragging them.

== Track listing ==
All tracks are written by Phil Jamieson and Pat Davern, except as shown

CD single
No.	Title	Length
1.	"Black Tattoo"	2:50
2.	"Fire & Fire" (Phil Jamieson, M. Strong)	4:15
3.	"Black Tattoo" (Live)	2:51

== Charts ==
Chart (2007)	Peak position
Australia (ARIA)	45
