= Rock Show (Grinspoon song) =

Single by Grinspoon

from the album Easy
- Released: 5 May 2000
- Recorded: August–September 1999
- Genre: Alternative metal, post-grunge
- Length: 4:05
- Label: Grudge (Universal)
- Songwriters: Pat Davern, Phil Jamieson
- Producer: Jonathon Burnside

Grinspoon singles chronology
"Secrets" (2000)	"Rock Show" (2000)	"Violent and Lazy" (2000)

"Rock Show" was the third single by Grinspoon from their second studio album Easy. It was released on 5 May 2000 on the Grudge label (the Australian imprint of Universal Records), reaching No. 78 on the Australian Singles Chart and polling at No. 33 on Triple J's Hottest 100 for 2000.

== History ==
After undertaking an extensive tour of the US promoting their debut album, Guide to Better Living, the band set about recording a follow-up album in with producer Jonathan Burnside (Nirvana, Melvins, Depeche Mode, Meat Beat Manifesto) in August 1999. The album, Easy, was recorded in Sydney and mixed in Melbourne. Easy was released on 1 November 1999, peaking at No. 4 on the Australian Album Chart and was certified platinum in Australia. The first single from the album, "Ready 1" was released in October 1999 and peaked at No. 36 on the ARIA Singles Chart. The second single, "Secrets", released in January 2000 peaked at No. 83.

The third single, "Rock Show" was not released until 5 May 2000, it wasn't as successful as "Ready 1" only reaching No. 78 on the Australian Singles Chart It was however voted in at No. 33 on Triple J's Hottest 100 for 2000, whereas "Secrets" only polled at No. 73. The other tracks on the single were an acoustic version of "Undercover" recorded at Triple M's studios and "Ready 1" recorded at the Sydney 2000 Big Day Out concert by the ABC.

== Music video ==
The music video features Phil Jamieson as a host on a game show similar to The Price Is Right, where the contestants are the other band members and a woman.

== Track listing ==
All tracks are written by Phil Jamieson and Pat Davern, except as shown

CD single
No.	Title	Length
1.	"Rock Show"	3:42
2.	"Undercover" (Acoustic - Phil Jamieson, Pat Davern, Joe Hansen)	4:27
3.	"Ready 1" (Live at Big Day Out)	2:45

== Charts ==
Chart (2000)	Rank
Australia (ARIA Charts)	78
