= DC×3 =

Single by Grinspoon

from the album Guide to Better Living
- Released: 11 August 1997
- Recorded: February 1997
- Genre: Alternative metal, post-grunge
- Length: 2:56
- Label: Grudge/Universal Music Australia
- Songwriter(s): Pat Davern, Phil Jamieson
- Producer(s): Phillip McKellar

Grinspoon singles chronology
"'Pedestrian'" (1997)	"DC×3" (1997)	"'Repeat'" (1997)

"DC×3" (Dead Cat Three Times) is the second single released by Australian rock band Grinspoon, from the debut album, Guide to Better Living. It peaked at No. 50 on the ARIA Singles Chart. It also reached No. 34 on Triple J's Hottest 100 in 1997.

"DC×3" was written by band members Phil Jamieson and Pat Davern. The song was recorded at Rocking Horse Studios in February 1997. The B-side, "Fire Engine Man" was recorded live and mixed at Soundlevel Studios in January 1997.

== Track listing ==
No.	Title	Writer(s)	Length
1.	"DC×3"	Phil Jamieson, Pat Davern	2:56
2.	"Fire Engine Man"	Phil Jamieson, Pat Davern, Joe Hansen, Kristian Hopes	3:00
Total length:			5:56

== Personnel ==
Grinspoon members

- Phil Jamieson – vocals, guitar
- Pat Davern – guitar
- Joe Hansen – bass guitar
- Kristian Hopes – drums

Production details

- Engineer – Jason Blackwell ("Fire Engine Man")
- Recording Engineer – Greg Courtney
- Mastering – Don Bartley
- Mixing – Phillip McKellar
- Producer – Phil McKellar, Grinspoon – Producer
- Studio – Rocking Horse Studios

== Charts ==
Chart (1997)	Peak position
Australia (ARIA)	50
