= Passerby =

Passerby or The Passerby may refer to:

== Film, television and theater ==
- The Passerby, a 1913 film directed by James Neill
- The Passerby (1951 film) (La Passante), a French drama film
- The Passerby (1982 film) (La passante du Sans-Souci), a French-West German drama film
- The Passerby (TV series), a 1950s American anthology series
- Mr. Passerby, a character in the 1988 play Mr A's Amazing Maze Plays, by Alan Ayckbourn

== Music ==
- Flyleaf (band), previously Passerby, an American rock band with an eponymous EP
- Passerby, a 2014 album by Luluc
- Passerby, a 2009 EP by Allie Moss
- "Passerby", a 2012 song by Grinspoon from Black Rabbits
- "Passer-by", a 2014 song by Jay Chou from Aiyo, Not Bad

== See also ==
- "The Passersby", an episode of the TV series The Twilight Zone
- Passer by (disambiguation)
