= Triple J's Hottest 100 of 2002 =

Australian record chart

2002 Triple J Hottest 100
- Album artwork for the CD compilation

Countdown details
- Date of countdown: 26 January 2003

Countdown highlights
- Winning song: Queens of the Stone Age "No One Knows"
- Most entries: Dave Grohl (10 tracks)

Chronology
← Previous; 2001	Next → 2003

The 2002 Triple J Hottest 100, announced on 26 January 2003, was the tenth of such countdowns of the most popular songs of the year, according to listeners of the Australian radio station Triple J. As in previous years, a CD featuring 39 (not necessarily the top 39) songs was released. For the first time, a DVD, containing film clips of songs from the Hottest 100 was also released. This was also the last time that phone voting was allowed; in the 2003 poll, only internet voting was permitted. SMS voting was removed for the 2003 poll but was reinstated in the 2004 event

When the announcers got to the number one track, they announced that rapper Nelly's song "Hot in Herre" had won the Hottest 100, after playing half of the song, they declared that it had been a joke, broke the CD on air, and began playing Queens of the Stone Age's "No One Knows".

The band Salmon Hater came in at number 26 with their song "6.66" after Triple J morning show hosts Adam Spencer and Wil Anderson made an effort to rig the event, telling listeners to vote for the otherwise unlikely candidate.

== Full list ==
Note: Australian artists

#	Song	Artist	Country of origin
1	No One Knows	Queens of the Stone Age	United States
2	Chemical Heart	Grinspoon	Australia
3	London Still	The Waifs	Australia
4	Karma	1200 Techniques	Australia
5	Get Free	The Vines	Australia
6	Rollercoaster	Machine Gun Fellatio	Australia
7	Lose Yourself	Eminem	United States
8	Pussy Town	Machine Gun Fellatio	Australia
9	By the Way	Red Hot Chili Peppers	United States
10	The Greatest View	Silverchair	Australia
11	The One	Foo Fighters	United States
12	You Know You're Right	Nirvana	United States
13	All My Life	Foo Fighters	United States
14	Lost Control	Grinspoon	Australia
15	No Reason	Grinspoon	Australia
16	The Zephyr Song	Red Hot Chili Peppers	United States
17	Without Me	Eminem	United States
18	Toxicity	System of a Down	United States
19	Highly Evolved	The Vines	Australia
20	Cochise	Audioslave	United States
21	Outtathaway!	The Vines	Australia
22	Something Borrowed, Something Blue	Ben Lee	Australia
23	Times Like These	Foo Fighters	United States
24	Keep Fishin'	Weezer	United States
25	Without You	Silverchair	Australia
26	6.66	Salmon Hater	Australia
27	Home Is Where the Heart Is	John Butler Trio	Australia
28	I Am Mine	Pearl Jam	United States
29	Carry On	Motor Ace	Australia
30	Ms. Jackson	The Vines	Australia
31	One in a Million	Bodyjar	Australia
32	Release	George	Australia
33	Hate to Say I Told You So	The Hives	Sweden
34	Comfort Me	Pacifier	New Zealand
35	Luv Your Life	Silverchair	Australia
36	Here Comes September	Waikiki	Australia
37	Aerials	System of a Down	United States
38	The Bold and the Beautiful	The Drugs	Australia
39	In My Place	Coldplay	United Kingdom
40	Fall for You	The Whitlams	Australia
41	What's the Deal?	28 Days	Australia
42	Don't Mug Yourself	The Streets	United Kingdom
43	Breaking it Slowly	George	Australia
44	God Is in the Radio	Queens of the Stone Age	United States
45	Punk's Not Dead	Darren Hanlon	Australia
46	Rock Star	N.E.R.D	United States
47	1000 Miles	Grinspoon	Australia
48	Go with the Flow	Queens of the Stone Age	United States
49	What's Golden	Jurassic 5	United States
50	You Give Me Something	Jamiroquai	United Kingdom
51	Down River	The Wilcannia Mob	Australia
52	One Said to the Other	The Living End	Australia
53	Get Me Off	Basement Jaxx	United Kingdom
54	Do It with Madonna	The Androids	Australia
55	Disenchanted Lullaby	Foo Fighters	United States
56	First It Giveth	Queens of the Stone Age	United States
57	Love Foolosophy	Jamiroquai	United Kingdom
58	Hitting the Ground	PJ Harvey	United Kingdom
59	Take It Slow	Machine Gun Fellatio	Australia
60	A Little Less Conversation	JXL vs. Elvis Presley	Netherlands/United States
61	We Are All Made of Stars	Moby	United States
62	Across the Night	Silverchair	Australia
63	Say Something	Something for Kate	Australia
64	Shot Shot	Gomez	United Kingdom
65	Nobody Likes a Bogan	Area-7	Australia
66	This Train Will Be Taking No Passengers	Augie March	Australia
67	New Technology	Waikiki	Australia
68	Whatever Happened to My Rock 'n' Roll (Punk Song)	Black Rebel Motorcycle Club	United States
69	Clocks	Coldplay	United Kingdom
70	Bucket Bong	Frenzal Rhomb	Australia
71	Do Your Thing	Basement Jaxx	United Kingdom
72	Show Me How to Live	Audioslave	United States
73	Dope Nose	Weezer	United States
74	I'm a DJ	Sonic Animation	Australia
75	Dy-Na-Mi-Tee	Ms. Dynamite	United Kingdom
76	World Upon Your Shoulders	Silverchair	Australia
77	Has It Come to This?	The Streets	United Kingdom
78	Something to Talk About	Badly Drawn Boy	United Kingdom
79	Who Put the Devil in You	You Am I	Australia
80	Highway One	The Waifs	Australia
81	You Think I Ain't Worth a Dollar, But I Feel Like a Millionaire	Queens of the Stone Age	United States
82	Strawberry Fields Forever	Ben Harper	United States
83	Take Me Away	28 Days	Australia
84	Little by Little	Oasis	United Kingdom
85	Star Guitar	The Chemical Brothers	United Kingdom
86	Cleanin' Out My Closet	Eminem	United States
87	Innervision	System of a Down	United States
88	Everything's Gone Bad	The Fergusons	Australia
89	Purple Haze	Groove Armada	United Kingdom
90	Silent Sigh	Badly Drawn Boy	United Kingdom
91	Being Followed	Rocket Science	Australia
92	Called	Antiskeptic	Australia
93	A Sorta Fairytale	Tori Amos	United States
94	Arse Huggin' Pants	Spiderbait	Australia
95	She Wears a Mask	Machine Translations	Australia
96	Lies	The Waifs	Australia
97	Electrical Storm (William Orbit Mix)	U2	Ireland
98	Shock (Living Without You)	Cartman	Australia
99	Too Drunk to Drive	Bodyjar	Australia
100	A Rush of Blood to the Head	Coldplay	United Kingdom

== Statistics ==
=== Artists with multiple entries ===
#	Artist	Tracks
10	Dave Grohl (Note: Five with Queens of the Stone Age (1, 44, 48, 56, 81), four with the Foo Fighters (11, 13, 23, 55) and once with Nirvana (12))	1, 11, 12, 13, 23, 44, 48, 55, 56, 81
5	Queens of the Stone Age	1, 44, 48, 56, 81
5	Silverchair	10, 25, 35, 62, 76
4	Grinspoon	2, 14, 15, 47
4	The Vines	5, 19, 21, 30
4	Foo Fighters	11, 13, 23, 55
3	The Waifs	3, 80, 96
3	Machine Gun Fellatio	6, 8, 59
3	Eminem	7, 17, 86
3	System of a Down	18, 37, 87
3	Coldplay	39, 69, 100
2	Red Hot Chili Peppers	9, 16
2	Audioslave	20, 72
2	Weezer	24, 73
2	Bodyjar	31, 99
2	george	32, 43
2	Waikiki	36, 67
2	28 Days	41, 83
2	The Streets	42, 77
2	Jamiroquai	50, 57
2	Basement Jaxx	53, 71

=== Countries represented ===
Country	Total
Australia	50
United States	31
United Kingdom	17
Netherlands	1
Ireland	1
New Zealand	1
Sweden	1

=== Records ===
- It was announced that song #101 was "Nothing Lasts Forever" by Jebediah. Triple J morning show hosts Adam Spencer and Wil Anderson later apologized to the band, as Salmon Hater "took their spot" in the countdown.
- Grinspoon equal Killing Heidi's record of the highest placing of a Triple J Unearthed artist at #2.
- At age 42, Mark Lanegan is the oldest person to win the Hottest 100.
- A record low 62 different artists appeared in the 2002 Hottest 100.
- Dave Grohl's ten entries with Queens of the Stone Age, Nirvana and the Foo Fighters in the 2002 countdown, sets the record for most appearances in a Hottest 100.
  - Following his appearance on "No One Knows" by Queens of the Stone Age, Dave Grohl is the first artist to have won both an annual Hottest 100, as well as an "Of All Time" countdown (Grohl previously won the 1991 and 1998 Of All Time countdowns with his appearance on "Smells Like Teen Spirit" by Nirvana)
- "You Give Me Something" by Jamiroquai charted in the countdown for the second year in a row, having featured in the 2001 Hottest 100 at #62.
- Regurgitator made their eighth consecutive appearance in the Hottest 100, having appeared in every annual countdown since 1995.
  - The Whitlams made their seventh consecutive appearance in the Hottest 100, having appeared in every annual countdown since 1996.
  - The Living End and Something for Kate both made their sixth consecutive appearance, with both bands having appeared since 1997.

== Top 10 Albums of 2002 ==
Bold indicates winner of the Hottest 100.

#	Artist	Album	Country of origin	Tracks in the Hottest 100
1	Silverchair	Diorama	Australia	10, 25, 35, 62, 76
2	The Vines	Highly Evolved	Australia	5, 19, 21
3	Foo Fighters	One by One	United States	13, 23, 55
4	george	Polyserena	Australia	32, 43 (19, 92 in 2001)
5	**Queens of the Stone Age**	**Songs for the Deaf**	**United States**	**1, 44, 48, 56, 81**
6	Grinspoon	New Detention	Australia	2, 14, 15, 47
7	Red Hot Chili Peppers	By the Way	United States	9, 16
8	Coldplay	A Rush of Blood to the Head	United Kingdom	39, 69, 100
9	Machine Gun Fellatio	Paging Mr. Strike	Australia	6, 8, 59 (30 in 2001)
10	Audioslave	Audioslave	United States	20, 72

== CD release ==
The double CD titled triple j – Hottest 100: Vol 10 Various Artists was released 3 March 2003. It is a compilation of 39 songs that made it into the Hottest 100.

**Disc 1**
1. Queens of the Stone Age – "No One Knows" (#1)
2. Grinspoon – "Chemical Heart" (#2)
3. Foo Fighters – "All My Life" (#13)
4. The Waifs – "London Still" (#3)
5. Machine Gun Fellatio – "Pussy Town (Original Album Version)" (#8)
6. 1200 Techniques – "Karma" (#4)
7. The Vines – "Get Free" (#5)
8. The Drugs – "The Bold and the Beautiful" (#38)
9. Antiskeptic – "Called" (#92)
10. N*E*R*D – "Rock Star (Jason Nevins Remix Edit)" (#46)
11. Bodyjar – "One in a Million" (#31)
12. george – "Release" (#32)
13. Badly Drawn Boy – "Something to Talk About" (#78)
14. The Streets – "Don't Mug Yourself" (#42)
15. Wilcannia Mob – "Down River" (#51)
16. The Hives – Hate to Say I Told You So" (#33)
17. Darren Hanlon – "Punk's Not Dead" (#45)
18. Coldplay – "In My Place" (#39)
19. The Fergusons – "Everything's Gone Bad" (#88)
**Disc 2**
1. Basement Jaxx – "Get Me Off" (#53)
2. Silverchair – "The Greatest View" (#10)
3. Rocket Science – "Being Followed" (#91)
4. Jurassic 5 – "What's Golden" (#49)
5. Elvis Presley vs. JXL – "A Little Less Conversation" (#60)
6. Salmon Hater – "6.66" (#26)
7. Waikiki – "Here Comes September" (#36)
8. Motor Ace – "Carry On" (#29)
9. John Butler Trio – "Home Is Where the Heart Is" (#27)
10. Ms Dynamite – "Dy-Na-Mi-Tee" (#75)
11. Ben Lee – "Something Borrowed, Something Blue" (#22)
12. 28 Days – "What's The Deal?" (#41)
13. The Living End – "One Said to the Other" (#52)
14. Sonic Animation – "I'm A DJ (Original)" (#74)
15. Machine Translations – "She Wears a Mask" (#95)
16. Groove Armada – "Purple Haze (Edit)" (#89)
17. Cartman – "Shock (Living Without You)" (#98)
18. The Whitlams – "Fall for You (Perky Mix)" (#40)
19. Weezer – "Keep Fishin'" (#24)
20. Pacifier – "Comfort Me" (#34)

=== DVD release ===
Volume 10 DVD Cover

1. Queens of the Stone Age – "No One Knows" (#1)
2. The Vines – "Get Free" (#5)
3. Coldplay – "In My Place" (#39)
4. Rocket Science – "Being Followed" (#91)
5. Sonic Animation – "I'm a DJ (Original)" (#74)
6. The Hives – Hate to Say I Told You So" (#33)
7. Salmon Hater – "6.66" (#26)
8. The Waifs – "London Still" (#3)
9. Ben Lee – "Something Borrowed, Something Blue" (#22)
10. N*E*R*D – "Rock Star (Jason Nevins Remix Edit)" (#46)
11. Groove Armada – "Purple Haze (Edit)" (#89)
12. Grinspoon – "Chemical Heart" (#2)
13. Pacifier – "Comfort Me" (#34)
14. Waikiki – "Here Comes September" (#36)
15. Antiskeptic – "Called" (#92)
16. The Streets – "Don't Mug Yourself" (#42)
17. 1200 Techniques – "Karma" (#4)
18. 28 Days – "What's The Deal?" (#41)
19. Badly Drawn Boy – "Something to Talk About" (#78)
20. The Living End – "One Said to the Other" (#52)
21. Bodyjar – "One in a Million" (#31)
22. Darren Hanlon – "Punk's Not Dead" (#45)
23. Weezer – "Keep Fishin'" (#24)
24. Silverchair – "The Greatest View" (#10)
25. Motor Ace – "Carry On" (#29)
26. Ms Dynamite – "Dy-Na-Mi-Tee" (#75)
27. The Whitlams – "Fall for You" (#40)
28. John Butler Trio – "Home Is Where the Heart Is" (#27)
29. Machine Translations – "She Wears a Mask" (#95)
30. Cartman – "Shock (Living Without You)" (#98)
31. The Drugs – "The Bold and the Beautiful" (#38)
32. Elvis Presley vs. JXL – "A Little Less Conversation" (#60)

== See also ==
- 2002 in music
