= Bleed You Dry =

2005 song performed by Grinspoon

Single by Grinspoon

from the album Thrills, Kills & Sunday Pills
- Released: 13 June 2005
- Recorded: 2004
- Genre: Post-grunge
- Length: 3:31
- Label: Universal Records
- Songwriter(s): Joe Hansen, Phil Jamieson
- Producer(s): Howard Benson

Grinspoon singles chronology
"Hold on Me" (2005)	"Bleed You Dry" (2005)	"Sweet As Sugar" (2005)

"Bleed You Dry" is the fourth single by Australian rock band Grinspoon from their fourth studio album Thrills, Kills & Sunday Pills. It was released on 13 June 2005 via Universal Records, which peaked in the top 100 on the ARIA Singles Chart. The music video for "Bleed You Dry" was directed by James Hackett and Jean Camden and was a finalist in the 2005 SoundKILDA music video competition as part of the St Kilda Film Festival.

== Track listing ==
All tracks are written by Phil Jamieson and Joe Hansen, unless otherwise shown

No.	Title	Length
1.	"Bleed You Dry" ([Ben Rosen Mix])	3:31
2.	"Red Rum"	3:21
3.	"Sunny Sky" (Pat Davern, Jamieson)	2:56
4.	"Bleed You Dry" ([album version])	3:29

== Charts ==
Chart (2005)	Rank
Australia (ARIA Charts)	67
