= 1000 Miles (Grinspoon song) =

Single by Grinspoon

from the album New Detention
- Released: 18 August 2003
- Recorded: 2001–2002
- Genre: Alternative metal, post-grunge
- Length: 2:21
- Label: Universal
- Songwriter(s): Phil Jamieson
- Producer(s): Phil McKeller

Grinspoon singles chronology
"No Reason" (2003)	"1000 Miles" (2003)	"Hard Act to Follow" (2004)

"1000 Miles" is the fourth single by Australian rock band Grinspoon from their third studio album New Detention (June 2002). It was released on 18 August 2003 by Universal Music Australia, which reached the ARIA Singles Chart top 100.

The three other tracks on the single were recorded in early 2003 at the band's live performance at the Enmore Theatre in Sydney, on their Panic Attack Tour. This release also includes a music video for the song, which is animated and was not broadcast on television, it features rednecks and has band member, Phil Jamieson, as a preacher endorsing alcohol.

The song was played on Triple J radio as an album track during the latter half of 2002 and reached No. 47 on the station's Hottest 100 for that year.

== Track listing ==
All tracks are written by As noted below

CD single
No.	Title	Length
1.	"1000 Miles (Phil Jamieson)"	2:22
2.	"Rockshow (Pat Davern, Phil Jamieson)" (Live at Enmore Theatre)	4:22
3.	"Boltcutter (Joe Hansen, Phil Jamieson)" (Live at Enmore Theatre)	3:21
4.	"1000 Miles" (Live at Enmore Theatre)	4:00
5.	"1000 Miles" (Enhanced video)	2:41

== Charts ==
Chart (2003)	Rank
Australia (ARIA Charts)	73

== Release history ==
Region	Date	Label	Format	Catalogue
Australia	18 August 2003	Universal	CD	9808673
Australia	16 October 2005	Universal	Digital download	-
