= Chasing Gravity =

Australian musical group

- Origin: Brisbane, Queensland, Australia
- Genre: Alternative rock
- Years active: 2003–present
- Label: Kid Audio
- Members: Peter Thornley; Robby Edge; Emmet Brazil; Dominic Hooghuis
- Past members: Nick Matheson; Pauly Johnston; Bryce Gilhome
- Website: Official website

Chasing Gravity are an Australian rock band from Brisbane, Queensland, formed in 2003 as Elephant Mojo. The members of the band are: Peter Thornley, vocals; Dominic Hooghuis, drums; Emmet Brazil, bass; and Robby Edge, guitar. Their debut album was released in April 2008 and the debut single has been featured on radio station Triple J's evening request show.

== History ==
=== Bring It EP ===
The band released their debut EP in 2003. Initially recorded with the intent of being used as a demo, "Bring It" was released nationally to support the band's growing reputation and support amongst the live music scene.

=== Warped Chinese Whispers ===
The second release for the band was 'Warped Chinese Whispers' a single that was released nationally in 2004, this single was the band's first politically tinged recording, touching on issues of a corrupt government and the people's right to be free anywhere in the world.

=== Cool in America EP ===
In 2006, the band released the 'Cool in America' E.P. The title track from 'Cool America' is touching on the issue of Australian culture being an imitation of America's. The video for the song featured on the ABC's late night music video show, Rage. The Band embarked on their first full national tour that year to support the EP. The band relocated from their native Brisbane to live and work in Melbourne and spend time writing their debut album

=== Name Change and Autumn in the Platinum Desert ===
In 2007, the band changed their name to Chasing Gravity to reflect the nature of their change in musical direction. The band recorded the debut album, Autumn in the Platinum Desert, under the stewardship of producer Phil McKellar (Silverchair, Grinspoon, Spiderbait) and traveled to New York to have the album mixed. The band wanted to fund the album themselves and toured outback WA and Queensland mine sites to earn the money to do so.

The album was released in April 2008 and as of May 2008, the band are touring nationally to support the album with headlining shows and supporting acts such as Birds of Tokyo.

=== New record and new band members ===
The band recently parted ways with guitarist (Nick Matheson) and bass player (Pauly Johnston). The remaining members, not ready to call it a day, recruited multi instrumentalist Bryce Gilhome for bass duties and ex 'Swanky Dee' and session guitarist Robby Edge. In December 2009, Bryce decided to move on so he could focus on other projects, the three remaining members then recruited Emmet Brazil. With the line up complete again the band has settled down to start work on their sophomore record.

=== Statue of Stone ===
In November 2009 the band released a new single "Statue of Stone", within a few days the single had charted and flown up the iTunes charts.

== Discography ==
=== Albums and EPs ===
- Bring It (2003)
- Cool in America (2006)
- Autumn in the Platinum Desert (2008)

=== Singles ===
- "Statue of Stone" (2009)

==== Australia ====
- "Warped Chinese Whispers" (2004)
- "Bright Lights" (2008)
