= Buzznet =

Pop culture news platform

- Genre: News
- Founded: March 2003; 23 years ago, in Los Angeles, California
- Founders: Marc Brown, Steve Haldane, Kevin Woolery, Anthony Batt
- Parent: Hive Media
- Website: Official website

BuzzNet is a photo, journal, and video-sharing pop culture news network that is currently owned by Hive Media. The network was owned by SpinMedia (formerly Buzz Media) from its inception until September 2016, when it was sold to Hive Media.

Like other social networking services, Buzznet is a platform for members to share content based on their personal interests. Unlike other social networking services that focus primarily on messaging and profile pages, Buzznet members participate in communities that are created around ideas, events and interests, most predominantly music, celebrities, and the media.

== History ==
=== Founding ===
The company was established in March 2003 in Los Angeles, California, by Marc Brown, Steve Haldane, Kevin Woolery and Anthony Batt (CEO). The site was officially launched in 2005 when the company received private funding from Anthem Venture Partners. Facilitating users posting their own photographs quickly, particularly camera-phone photographs from live concerts and events, from 2005 until 2008, Buzznet served as the official online community for Coachella. Before the end of 2005, newspapers and journalists utilized Buzznet’s photo galleries. Newspapers that joined Buzznet for its photo-sharing capabilities included the Houston Chronicle for Hurricane Rita coverage, the Miami Herald for Hurricane Wilma coverage, and the Biloxi, Miss. Sun-Herald for Hurricane Katrina coverage. As of 2005, of the co-founders Marc Brown and Anthony Batt, Brown served as president. Steve Haldane was director of technology, while Rich Lee was art director.

In 2007, Buzznet named former Feedster president Tyler Goldman as its CEO. According to a March Hitwise report, in February 2007 Buzznet’s site visits more than doubled. The report deemed Buzznet the fastest growing social media community on the internet. In April 2007 Buzznet hosted the official online community for the Coachella Valley Music and Arts Festival. In May 2007 Buzznet received a $6 million round of funding from Redpoint Ventures and previous investors, Anthem Venture Partners. At the time, according to TechCrunch, Buzznet claimed to have 6 million users. In 2007, Buzznet.com partnered with the Honda Civic Tour and the social media fan site Friends or Enemies.

=== Acquisitions ===
In March 2008, Buzznet received an additional funding round of $25 million. In 2008, Buzznet embarked on a number of acquisitions, primarily popular music blogs. In April 2008, Buzznet acquired Idolator and also brought on Universal Music Group as an equity holder and content partner. In April 2008, Buzznet also announced the acquisition of the popular music blog Stereogum. In May 2008, Buzznet announced a partnership with TheGauntlet.com for its heavy metal music content. Unlike its other music site buyouts, this is Buzznet's first and only content partnership. By 2008, Buzznet.com had partnered with Tila Tequila to create a separate site called tilashotspot.com. As of July 2008, Buzznet was partnered with heavy metal site TheGauntlet.com. From May 5, 2008, Buzznet owned AbsolutePunk until it was repurchased by the founder of the website on March 31, 2016. In November 2008, it laid off ten workers, bringing its staff to 79.

=== Buzz Media, Inc. ===
After raising $12.5 million in March 2009, Buzznet changed its name to Buzz Media, Inc. to "more accurately reflect its focus" as owner of multiple websites beyond its flagship property buzznet.com.

Buzznet relaunched on May 13, 2010 with customized feed functions and reblogging features, as well as Facebook Connect. Aviva Yael had been hired as editor to oversee the new version. It remained owned by the conglomerate BuzzMedia. Later that month, Buzzmedia, formerly known as Buzznet, purchased the six music sites PureVolume, PopMatters, Gorilla vs. Bear, The Hype Machine, Concrete Loop and RCRD LBL. Buzzmedia at that time already also owned Lyrics.com, Stereogum, Buzznet, Idolator, and Absolute Punk. At that point, the company had raised "$35 million in four rounds" from investors like Focus Ventures, Anthem Ventures, New Enterprise Associates, Redpoint Ventures and Sutter Hill Ventures. In March 2010, Compete reported that Buzznet had around 2.3 unique visitors that month.

=== Spin Media and sale to Hive Media ===
Buzz Media acquired Spin Media, publisher of Spin magazine, in July 2012. After shutting down the print version of the magazine, reducing its staff to about 200, and focusing on advertising, it rebranded itself as SpinMedia in March 2013. At that time, Steve Hansen became its chief executive.

In 2014, M/C Partners became the primary owner of SpinMedia after an assignment for benefit of creditors. That year, Buzz Media had also acquired music sites Property of Zack, AbsolutePunk.net, Under The Gun Review, and Punknews.org.

In September 2016, SpinMedia sold Buzznet, Idolator, and PureVolume to startup corporation Hive Media.

== Features ==
=== Homepage content ===
Buzznet is a website for people to discuss different kinds of music.

Banners displayed on the homepage link to Buzznet’s contest groups and Buzznet polls. Each Buzznet contest is typically endorsed by a band, celebrity, or record label. Past contests include “Get Dressed by Avril” Merch Model Search, endorsed by pop-rock icon, Avril Lavigne in 2007, and "Feel the Elite Beat" Dance Video Contest sponsored by Nintendo in 2006. The homepage also links to music features, festival updates, and internet stars.

=== User pages ===
User pages are controlled by individual members and can be customized with colors and text. Upon sign in, registered members are prompted to upload videos, photos, or post journals, all of which can be tagged to appropriate tag topic pages.

=== Tag topic pages ===
Tag topic pages house all photos, videos, journals, and links that have been tagged to a particular topic. Topics are most commonly a band, celebrity, or content genre. Tag topic pages also have a user-generated forum that hosts open discussions on subjects related to the tag.

=== Group pages ===
Group pages have features similar to tag topic pages, but are generally more content-specific and exclusive. Group pages are generally used for contests, events, and fan bases.

=== Buzz ===
Members are recognized for their popularity in the Buzznet community based on the amount of buzz they receive. Each photo, video, and journal can receive buzz from other members. Top buzzed members and top content contributors are recognized throughout the site.

=== Artists (bands) ===
Bands such as The All-American Rejects, The Maine, All Time Low, My Chemical Romance, Thirty Seconds to Mars, HIM AFI, Cartel, New Found Glory, Boys Like Girls, Blaqk Audio, Anberlin, The Sunpilots, Fall Out Boy, Kerli and Lostprophets maintained user pages and semi-active blogs on Buzznet as of 2008.

=== Buzznet mobile ===
Users can access Buzznet from a mobile device in four different ways. They can upload content directly via email, with ShoZu, or access their account with mobile and iPhone versions of the site. With the mobile version, users can update their account, upload photos, and post journals.

== See also ==
- Celebuzz
- List of virtual communities with more than 1 million users
- List of social networking services
