= Black Rabbits =

Studio album by Grinspoon
- Released: 28 September 2012
- Genres: Post-grunge, alternative rock
- Length: 44:12
- Label: Universal
- Producer: Dave Schiffman

Grinspoon chronology
Six to Midnight (2009)	Black Rabbits (2012)	Chemical Hearts (2019)

Singles from Black Rabbits
- 1. "Passerby" Released: 13 August 2012; 2. "Branded" Released: 9 February 2013

Black Rabbits is the seventh studio album by Australian post-grunge band Grinspoon, which was released on 28 September 2012. Its title is Cockney rhyming slang for "bad habits", which relates to their reputation as being "a hard rocking, harder living band from Lismore, NSW, who emerged at the turn of the millennium with the same never-say-no ethic of Seattle's toughest grunge bands."

The album peaked at No. 8 on the ARIA Albums Chart Two singles were released from the album, "Passerby" (August 2012) – which reached the top 100 on the ARIA Singles Chart – and "Branded" (February 2013).

== Reception ==
Arne Sjostedt of The Sydney Morning Herald praised Black Rabbits as "a great release from a band who has managed to plug out seven albums and maintain their reputation as the soul bearers of great Australian alternative rock." The AU Review's Sarah Wykes declared that it was "excellent", rated it as 9.0 out of 10 and found that it has "everything you expect from an Australian rock album, especially a Grinspoon album; impressive guitar riffs and catchy lyrics... [although] being lighter than previous albums... [it] may make some people worry about the band going in a different direction." [V] Music's reviewer noted that their "latest offering is once again a departure, more breezy power pop than gnarly indie rock with soaring melodies and, dare we say it, a danceable groove."

== Track listing ==
All tracks are written by Phil Jamieson and Pat Davern, unless otherwise shown

No.	Title	Length
1.	"Passerby"	3:34
2.	"Final Reward"	3:41
3.	"Beaujolais"	3:09
4.	"Branded"	3:06
5.	"Carry On"	3:40
6.	"Just a Sound"	3:12
7.	"Emergency"	3:11
8.	"Full Moon"	4:03
9.	"Casualties"	4:29
10.	"Another Sun"	2:54
11.	"Tightrope"	3:12
12.	"Raise Your Glass"	4:00
13.	"Battleground"	2:01
Total length:		44:12

== Charts ==
Chart (2012)	Peak position
Australian Albums (ARIA)	8
