= Grinspoon (EP) =

Green EP

EP by Grinspoon
- Released: 1 August 1995
- Recorded: July 1995; Grevillia Studios (Brisbane)
- Genre: Grunge, post-grunge, alternative metal
- Length: 21:45
- Label: Oracle, Universal
- Producer: Ramesh Sathiah

Grinspoon chronology
Green EP (1995)	Licker Bottle Cozy (1996)

Grinspoon EP, also known as the Green EP, is the debut extended play by the Australian band Grinspoon. The six-track EP was recorded over two weeks at Grevillia Studios in Brisbane in July 1995, with producer, Ramesh Sathiah, and was released on 1 August 1995 via local independent record label, Oracle Records.

Phil Jamieson, on lead vocals and guitar, co-wrote four tracks with Pat Davern, on lead guitar. One track, "Let It Go", was co-written by Jamieson with Joe Hansen, their bass guitarist, and another track, "Point of View", was written solely by Jamieson. The band was influenced at that time by the nu metal movement, including work by Helmet and Prong.

The EP includes an early version of "Sickfest", the song that gave the band a national profile by winning youth broadcaster, Triple J's inaugural Unearthed competition. "Sickfest" was that station's most requested track for seven weeks, and was listed on its Hottest 100 poll for that year.

One of the six tracks, "Dr Grinspoon", references Lester Grinspoon, the Boston psychiatrist for whom the band were named. "Sickfest" was re-recorded for their first studio album, Guide to Better Living (September 1997). Another track from this EP, "More Than You Are", also appeared on that album and on their third EP, Pushing Buttons (1998).

== Track listing ==
All tracks are written by Pat Davern, Phil Jamieson, except as noted

No.	Title	Length
1.	"More Than You Are"	2:26
2.	"Sickfest"	3:18
3.	"Save Me"	3:41
4.	"Let It Go"	3:24
5.	"Point of View"	9:03

Note: The song "Point of View" ends at 4:48. The hidden track "Dr Grinspoon" starts at 7:08, after 2 minutes and 20 seconds of silence.

The version of "Sickfest" on this EP features a sample at the beginning. The origin of the sample; "I also like the blow holes in the heads of rednecks" is from season 4, episode 16 of the American television series, The A-Team.

== Releases ==
Format	Country	Label	Catalogue No.	Year
CD	AUS	Oracle	ODCD-0668	1995

== Personnel ==
Grinspoon

- Pat Davern – guitar
- Joe Hansen – bass guitar
- Kristian Hopes – drums
- Phil Jamieson – vocals

Credits

- Julie Croxford – photography
- Harvey & Cahill Design – artwork
- Malcolm Jacobson – mastering, engineering (assistant)
- Ramesh Sathiah – producer, recording, engineering, mixing
