= Hold on Me (Grinspoon song) =

"Hold On Me"

Single by Grinspoon

from the album Thrills, Kills & Sunday Pills
- Released: 21 February 2005
- Recorded: June 2004; Bay 7 Studios, Los Angeles
- Genre: Post-grunge
- Length: 2:48
- Label: Universal Records
- Songwriters: Pat Davern, Phil Jamieson
- Producer: Howard Benson

Grinspoon singles chronology
"Better Off Alone" (2004)	"Hold On Me" (2005)	"Bleed You Dry" (2005)

"Hold on Me" is the third single released by Grinspoon from their fourth studio album Thrills, Kills & Sunday Pills. It was released on 21 February 2005 on the Universal Records label. The initial single release included a lapel pin badge under shrink wrap, with 'Hold On Me - Grinspoon EP' themed artwork. It debuted on the ARIA Singles Chart at No. 44 .

Four minutes and fifty-two seconds into the last track on the single, "Get the Fuck Out of Here", the original version of "Hold on Me" can be heard. It was entitled "Showpony" and contains different lyrics as well as slightly different arrangement. According to the band, the album's US record producer, Howard Benson, told them they couldn't call a song "Show Pony"' because he'd never heard the term, so the title of the song and the musical arrangement was changed. To promote the release of the single Grinspoon embarked on a national tour with New Zealand band, Shihad, called 'The Show Pony Express Tour'.

== Reception ==
The Australian Music Guide rated "Hold on Me" as the 35th most heard song by an Australian artist in 2005.

FasterLouder magazine in March 2005 described the song as being "an inoffensive, nice song. Grinspoon prove that they certainly still have a semblance of ‘it’ but ‘it’ is being translated through safer, more accessible means." The review describes "Jamieson as "soar(ing) through the chorus" and "the song is full of catchy hooks that are bound to get people a-moving on the dance floor at the band’s gigs. There is an element of cheesiness there, particularly in the line ‘how come you never wanna dance with me anymore?’, but this is strangely one of the most fun lines to sing along to."

== Music video ==
The music video for "Hold on Me" starts with Phil Jamieson giving a quick run-down of how the song came about. Apart from the opening image, the clip is in black-and-white and resembles a 60's TV performance.

== Track listing ==
All tracks are written by Phil Jamieson and Pat Davern, except as shown

CD single
No.	Title	Length
1.	"Hold on Me"	3:42
2.	"Way Too Far" (Phil Jamieson, Joe Hansen)	3:05
3.	"My Little Senorita" (Phil Jamieson, Joe Hansen)	2:16
4.	"Get the Fuck Out of Here/Showpony" (Phil Jamieson)	7:41

== Charts ==
Chart (2005)	Peak position
Australia (ARIA)	44
