= The Sunpilots =

Australian musical group

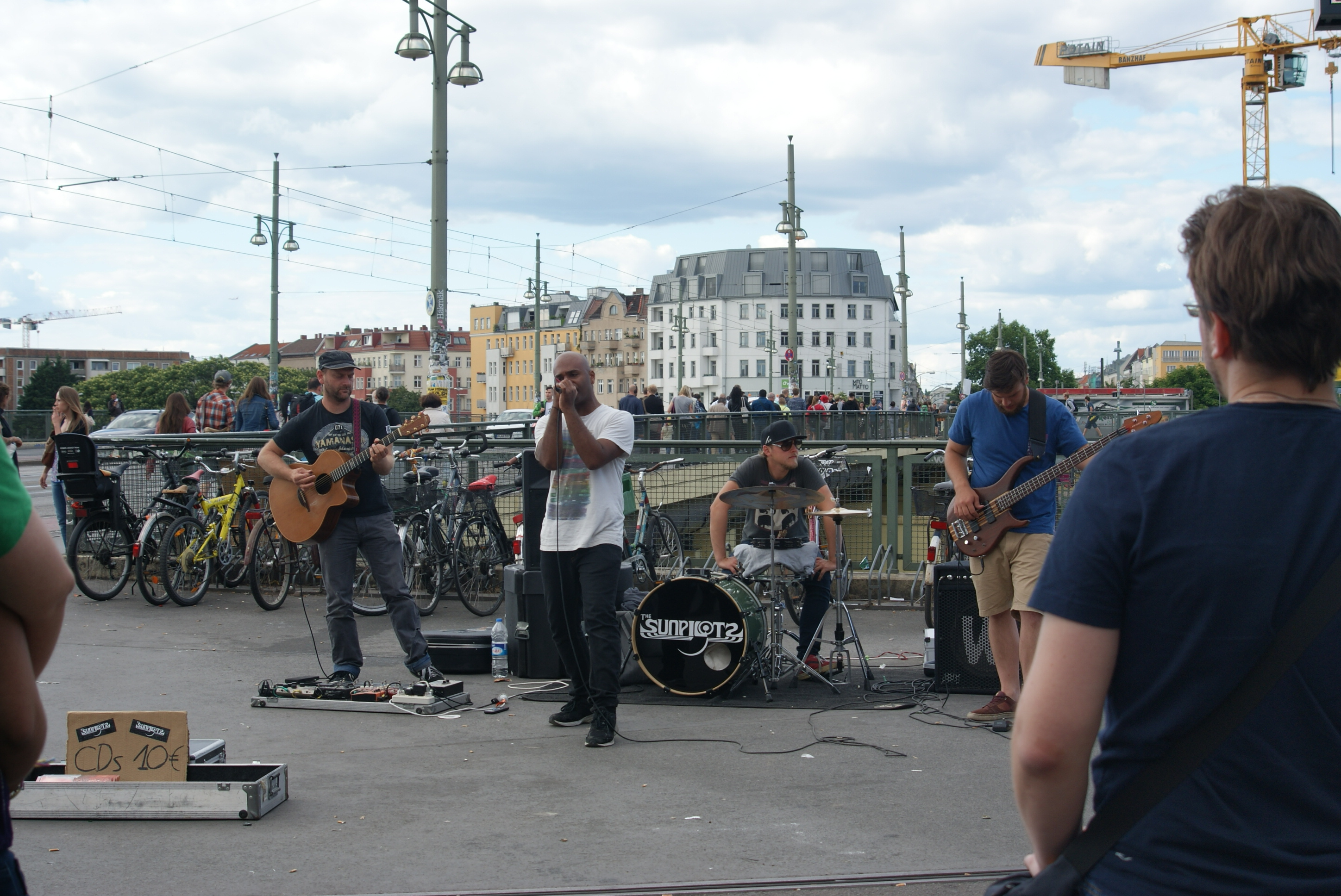
- The Sunpilots busking in Berlin, June, 2014

Background information
- Origin: Sydney, New South Wales, Australia
- Genres: Alternative rock
- Years active: 2006–present
- Labels: Honeytrap
- Members: Raj Siva-Rajah; Bob Spencer; Kay Ketting; Stephen Danger Prescott
- Past members: Justin Kool; Andrew Nielsen; Tom McGirr; Adil Baktir; Stefan Bielik
- Website: thesunpilots.com

The Sunpilots are an Australian alternative rock band formed in 2006 by mainstays Raj Siva-Rajah on lead vocals and Bob Spencer on lead guitar. They relocated to Berlin in September 2010. The group has issued two studio albums, Living Receiver (2009) and King of the Sugarcoated Tongues (2012).

== Formation and early days ==
The Sunpilots were formed in Sydney in early 2006 by Raj Siva-Rajah on lead vocals and Bob Spencer on lead guitar. Siva-Rajah, from Brisbane, learnt Carnatic music from the age of eight. His family moved to Adelaide where he fronted local alternative rock bands in high school and college, he moved to Sydney, where he met Spencer. The early line-up of the Sunpilots included Gavin Collison on bass guitar and Anthony Soole on percussion.

The Sunpilots released a five-track extended play in June 2006 as their first release via Honeytrap Records. Tracks received national airplay on Triple J and Nova, winning the Producers Award at the Musicoz Awards later that year. Siva-Rajah explained their preparations, "every rehearsal it ends up coming out slightly different. We did that and it just ended up sounding OK and we thought we'd put it onto a CD and get it out there mainly because we thought, 'not a huge amount is going to happen out of the first release for a band'."

== Living Receiver (2007–09) ==
The Sunpilots' began working on their debut album, Living Receiver, in 2007 and enlisted the help of Australian producer Phil McKellar (Silverchair, Powderfinger, Grinspoon) as co-producer and mix engineer. The band embarked on their Cold Hands, Warm Heart tour in August 2007, spanning five states, it was the band's first national tour. A new version of "Spotlight in the Sun" was released in May as its first single with an associated music video. It became the most added song on Australian radio during the week of 14 February 2008 and the video aired nationally on pop music TV shows MTV, Rage, Channel V and Video Hits. The track was chosen as an iTunes Single of the Week.

The Sunpilots finished recording Living Receiver in early 2008 and released it through their own label, Honeytrap Records, in August, followed by a national tour. The line-up was Siva-Rajah, Spencer, Justin Kool on bass guitar and Andy Nielsen on drums. The record won Best International Artist for the group at the Toronto Independent Music Awards and a Single of the Year at the LA Music Awards. The band was one of 15 rock music finalists in the International Songwriting Competition (nominated alongside fellow Australians, Eskimo Joe).

In 2009 the Sunpilots toured Australia twice more for their March of the Drones and Animals in My Mind tours. During the second tour the band performed at the One Movement Festival in Perth with the Hilltop Hoods, Sarah Blasko, Little Red and Kate Miller-Heidke and were MySpace Featured Artists.

== King of the Sugarcoated Tongues and move to Berlin (2010–15) ==
In 2010 the Sunpilots began working on their second album, King of the Sugarcoated Tongues. Following the completion of tracking at Studios 301 in September, the band relocated to Berlin to tour Europe extensively. They performed their first European show at the Popkomm Festival at Berlin Music Week 2010 on 9 September. King of the Sugarcoated Tongues was mixed in Berlin by German engineer Peter Schmidt in late 2011 and released worldwide in 2012. The record is a dystopian concept album about "human need for security and the freedoms we are willing to trade in return".

The Sunpilots toured Europe from 2011 to 2015, performing over 400 shows at festivals and clubs in the UK, Germany, Austria, Switzerland, France, Sweden, Netherlands, Belgium, Italy, Poland, Slovenia, Lithuania and Latvia. In September 2014 they completed their first US tour, performing 65 shows across 35 states.

During this time the band also became known for staying with their fans on tour and performing in Mauerpark near the Berlin Wall.

== Upcoming record (2016–present) ==
The Sunpilots began work on their third album in early 2016 and have launched a crowdfunding campaign to fund it. The album, which is being recorded in Spain and Berlin, is slated for release in late 2017 and will be followed by an extensive world tour.

In April 2016 the band took a break from recording to tour Canada.

== Members ==
=== Current line-up ===
- Raj Siva-Rajah (2006–present) – vocals
- Bob Spencer (2006–present) – guitar
- Kay Ketting (2013–present) – drums
- Stefan Bielik (2015–present) – bass guitar

=== Previous members ===
- Gavin Collison (2006) – bass guitar
- Anthony Soole (2006–07) – percussion
- Rob Ewan (2007) – bass guitar
- Justin Kool (2009–12) – bass guitar
- Andrew Nielsen (2009–11) – drums
- Tom McGirr (2011–12) – drums
- Adil Baktir (2012–15) – bass guitar

== Discography ==
=== Albums ===
- Living Receiver (2009)
- King of the Sugarcoated Tongues (2012)

=== Extended plays ===
- The Sunpilots (self-titled 5-track EP) (2006)

=== Singles ===
- Spotlight in the Sun (2007)
- You're Gonna Be a Star (2008)
- Drones (2009)
- Animals in My Mind (2009)
- The Piper's Mirror (2012)
