= Salmon Hater =

Salmon Hater is a fictional heavy metal band, manufactured by Adam Spencer and Wil Anderson of Triple J breakfast radio in Australia.

The name came about on air after the station had played a promo for Triple J's metal show, Full Metal Racket. The pair had an impromptu conversation, making reference to the names of many metal bands. Anderson asked Spencer what his favourite metal band was, and Spencer, put on the spot, gave the fake name "Salmon Hater", as a "premier fishcore" band with a lead singer named Torv.

Other details made up about the band were that they hailed from the hills of Glenelg (in Adelaide, South Australia. Glenelg is quite a flat suburb - when informed of this, Spencer stated that they were "underground hills") where they were part of the local "Fish Metal" scene (along with other non-existent bands such as "Trout Destroyer" and "Red Goering") and that their latest single was "6.66 - One Hundredth of the Number of the Beast". The title originated from the stereotypical "satanic" metal theme (e.g. Iron Maiden's The Number of the Beast, etc.), and Spencer's love for mathematics.

The next morning, a listener by the name of Mitch Hertz contacted Spencer and Anderson saying he was the "manager" of Salmon Hater and offered to bring the new single "6.66" into the studio for the duo to play on-air. On Friday of that week, lead singer "Torv" and manager Mitch Hertz gave a studio interview. That weekend, Spencer and Anderson reported seeing numerous fans wearing Salmon Hater t-shirts to the Big Day Out on the Gold Coast and in Melbourne.

Spencer and Anderson then encouraged listeners to vote for the song in the annual Triple J Hottest 100 poll, for which votes were only a few days away from closing. Many people were surprised that the track reached number 26 in the Triple J Hottest 100 of 2002, and some fans of other bands were upset that Anderson and Spencer had influenced the music poll. Other Triple J fans felt that the orchestrated campaign and the eventual ranking of the song reduced respect for the Hottest 100, and proved it as a sham.

The Australian music television program Rage usually plays the Hottest 100 a couple of months after the countdown. This meant there would be an opportunity for a music video to accompany the track to be broadcast. Many volunteers assembled for the filming of the music video, which was broadcast not only on Rage, but is available on the Hottest 100 Vol. 10 DVD release as well.

A few weeks later, Spencer and Anderson played a follow-up single "Shark Sandwich" on their show.

Salmon Hater performed a brief tour in June 2003, playing dates in Sydney and Melbourne. These were the last public appearances of the band.

Music videos were released for songs "Cod Piece Face" (referencing a line from a Young One's episode) and "You Are What I Eat"

In 2016, the official Salmon Hater Facebook page announced that after 12 years, authorities were finally closing a "missing persons" case and had classified lead singer Torvald Samunhäder as legally dead. In tribute, the "lost" Salmon Hater album "A Brief History of Salmon" was released on multiple streaming services, including a re-mixed version of "6.66"

== Discography ==
- A Brief History of Salmon (2016; recorded 2002)
