= Passer by =

Passer by may refer to:

- Passer By (song), a 2005 single by Mattafix
- Passer By (TV film), a 2004 BBC television drama

== See also ==
- Passerby (disambiguation)
