= Comeback (Grinspoon song) =

Single by Grinspoon

from the album Six to Midnight
- Released: 4 September 2009
- Recorded: 2009
- Genre: Alternative rock; post-grunge
- Length: 6:14
- Label: Universal
- Songwriter(s): Phil Jamieson
- Producer(s): Rick Will & Grinspoon

Grinspoon singles chronology
"'Dogs'" (2009)	"Comeback" (2009)	"'Summer'" (2009)

"Comeback" is the first single from Australian rock band Grinspoon's sixth album Six to Midnight. The song gained radio airplay in Australia and had a music video filmed for it. The song peaked at No. 48 on the ARIA Singles Chart on 27 September 2009.

== Track listing ==
1. Comeback — 3:07
2. Progress — 3:20

== Charts ==
Chart (2009)	Peak position
Australia (ARIA)	48
