= Informatics (band) =

Australian electronic post-punk band from Melbourne

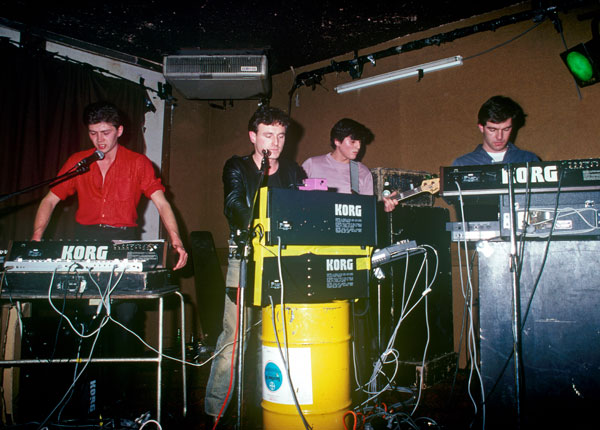
- Informatics performing at the Electronic Music Club, Central Club, Melbourne, 1983.

Background information
- Origin: Melbourne, Victoria, Australia
- Genres: Electronic, experimental, synth-pop, minimal wave, post-punk, alternative dance, industrial
- Years active: 1978–1986; 2012–present
- Labels: Au Go Go, Dark Entries, Sabbatical, Minimalkominat, Last Chance
- Members: Stephen Stelios Adam; Ramesh Ayar; Phil McKellar; Välek Sadovchikoff; Michael Trudgeon
- Website: informaticsmusic.com

Informatics are a post-punk electronic band from Melbourne, Australia formed in 1978 in the experimental sound lab of the Preston Institute School of Art.

Between 1979 and 1985, Informatics recorded numerous tracks, mainly in a garage, using a four-track tape machine and any electronic gear they could get their hands on to create sound.

Characterized by raw analogue synthesiser tones and mechanical rhythms, the group's early work was compiled and reissued in 2013 on the retrospective album Dance to a Dangerous Beat by Dark Entries Records.

== History ==
Informatics were formed by two art students, Michael Trudgeon and Välek Sadovchikoff, while studying experimental electronic music at the Preston Institute School of Art under David Tolley, one of Australia's finest avant-garde musicians. The group was soon joined by Steve Stelios Adam and Ramesh Ayar, with Phil McKellar completing the lineup.

Emerging from an experimental art and post-punk background, the band built a reputation for raw analogue synth sounds with mechanical rhythms, playing gigs around Melbourne and Tasmania. They also staged several live multimedia performances at the State Film Centre, Melbourne, in 1983.

Between January and November 1981, Informatics recorded their debut four-song Dezinformatzia EP, but it was not released until 1982 on Bruce Milne's Au Go Go Records (ANDA 020). The track “Proximity Switch”, later renamed “Accidents in Paradise”, became popular in parts of Europe and was re-released in 1985.

Tracks from the EP subsequently appeared on compilations and other releases. Unbeknownst to the band at the time, their music was topping dance charts in Germany and Belgium while they were still struggling to secure gigs in Melbourne.

In 2003, German label Punx Records, founded by DJ Moguai, released two 12-inch vinyl singles of dance remixes of "Accidents in Paradise" (also known as "Proximity Switch") under the name Informatix, titled Accidents in Paradise – Part 1 and Accidents in Paradise – Part 2. The records were released to coincide with the 2003 Love Parade in Berlin, and tracks were played to a 20,000-capacity audience at the Tiergarten.

By 1986, the band had entered an extended hiatus. They reunited in 2012 to perform at the Sabbatical Records Labour Day Weekend festival. Informatics have since continued to perform intermittently and remain active, with releases issued on vinyl and through digital platforms.

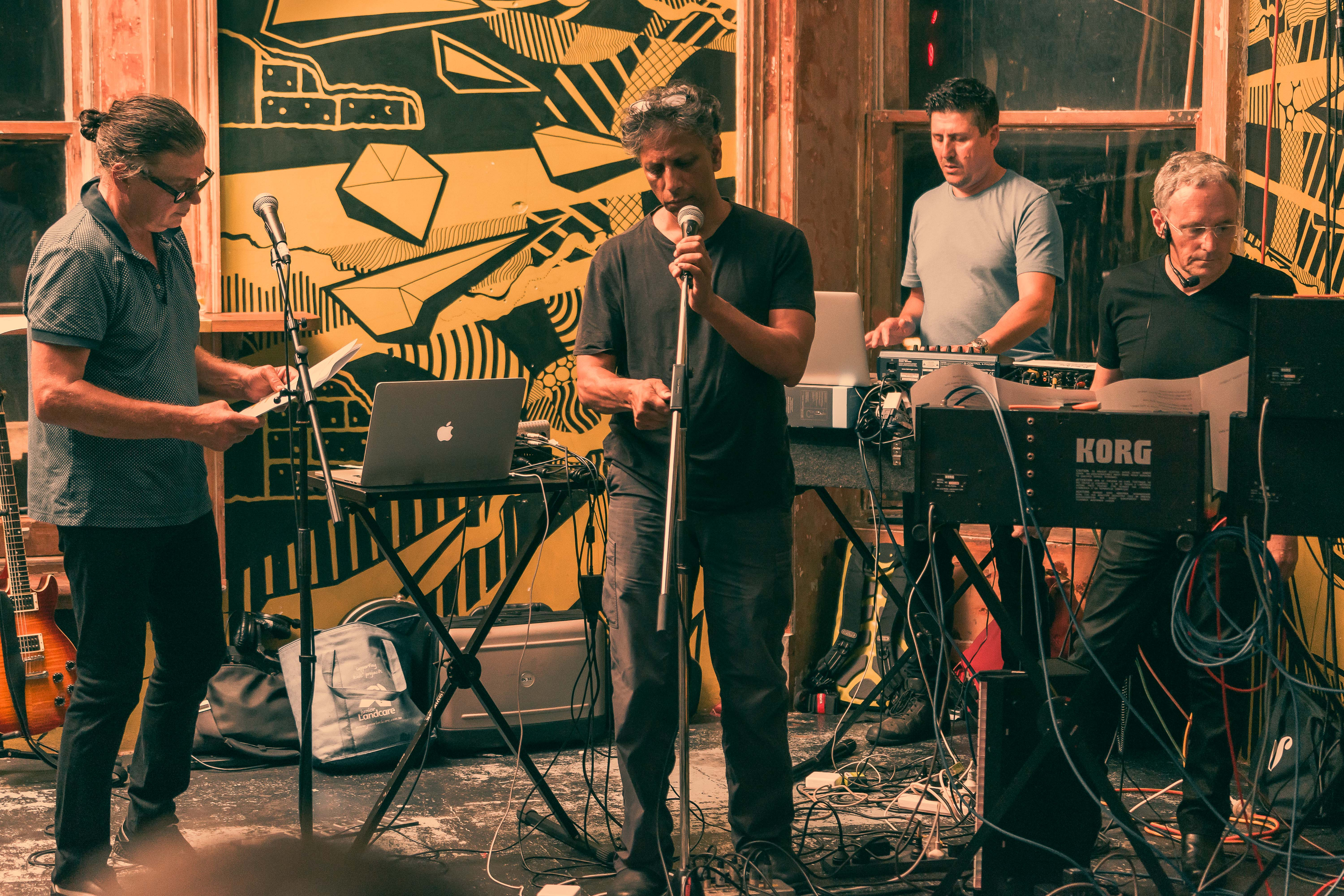
Informatics performing at the Lucy Guerin Studio, Melbourne, 2014

== Discography ==
- Dezinformatzia (1982)
- Accidents In Paradise (1985)
- In The Garden Of Euterpe (2003)
- Dance To A Dangerous Beat (2013)
- Polaroid Noise (2015)
- 30 Second Jetpack (2023)
- Lawn And Order (2024)
- Prey Drive (2026)

== Extended plays and remixes ==
- Accidents in Paradise – Part 1 (Informatix) (2003)
  - A - "Accidents in Paradise" (Si Begg Mix) – Remixed by Si Begg
  - B - "Accidents in Paradise" (Martin Heyder Mix) – Remixed by Martin Heyder
- Accidents in Paradise – Part 2 (Informatix) (2003)
  - A1 - "Accidents in Paradise" (Original Mix)
  - A2 - "Accidents in Paradise" (Genlog Mix) – Remixed by Genlog
  - B - "Accidents in Paradise" (Schulenburg Mix) – Remixed by Peter Schulenburg

== Compilations ==
- Fast Forward Cassette Vol. 1 (1980) – "Concorde Affaire"
- Fast Forward Cassette Vol. 5 (1981) – "Hungry Pets"
- E.M.C. Electronic Music Club (1983) – "The Great X-1"
- Crowd Magazine, Edition 1 (1983) – "Talk Talk Run"
- The Signal To Noise Set (1984) – "The Great X-1"
- Kult Klassix Vol. 2 (1993) – "Proximity Switch"
- EBM Club Classics (1998) – "Proximity Switch"
- Abby (The Compilation Part 2) (1999) – "Satellite To Russia"
- Dressed In Black (Best Of 80's New Wave/Gothic) (1999) – "Proximity Switch"
- Dr. Lektroluv Presents Elektrik Planet (2005) – "Proximity Switch"
- Missing Link / Collectors Corner: Record Store Day (2013) – "Underlife"
- Liaisons Dangereuses: Cult Radio Classics – The Early Years (2015) – "Proximity Switch"
- Closed Circuits: Australian Alternative Electronic Music of the '70s & '80s Vol. 1 (2017) – "The Great X-1"
