= Hard Act to Follow =

Single by Grinspoon

from the album Thrills, Kills & Sunday Pills
- Released: 9 August 2004
- Recorded: 2004
- Genre: Post-grunge, hard rock
- Length: 3:28
- Label: Universal Records
- Songwriter(s): Pat Davern, Phil Jamieson
- Producer(s): Howard Benson

Grinspoon singles chronology
"'1000 Miles'" (2003)	"Hard Act to Follow" (2004)	"'Better Off Alone'" (2004)

"Hard Act to Follow" is a song by Australian rock band Grinspoon and was released as the lead single from their fourth studio album Thrills, Kills & Sunday Pills. It reached No. 24 on the ARIA Singles Chart and was ranked #16 on Triple J's Hottest 100 of 2004.

The song was written by Phil Jamieson and Pat Davern, and performed by Grinspoon at the closing ceremony of the 2006 Commonwealth Games.

== Track listing ==
1. "Hard Act to Follow" - 3:28
2. "Nasty" - 3:17
3. "Find Your Own Way Home" - 2:45
4. "Hurricane" - 5:13
5. "Hard Act to Follow" (Video)

== Charts ==
Chart (2004)	Peak position
Australia (ARIA)	24
