= No Reason (Grinspoon song) =

Single by Grinspoon

from the album New Detention
- Released: 20 September 2002
- Recorded: 2001–2002
- Genre: Post-grunge
- Length: 3:49
- Label: Universal Records
- Songwriter(s): Phil Jamieson
- Producer(s): Phil McKeller

Grinspoon singles chronology
"'Lost Control'" (2002)	"No Reason" (2002)	"'1000 Miles'" (2003)

"No Reason" is a song by Grinspoon. It was released as the third single from their third studio album New Detention. The song peaked at top 62 on the ARIA Singles Chart and polled at No. 15 on Triple J Hottest 100, 2002.

== Track listing ==
1. "No Reason"
2. "Just Let It Go"
3. "Cluedo"
4. "No Reason" (Live at the Wireless)

== Charts ==
Chart (2002)	Rank
Australia (ARIA Charts)	62
