= Better Off Alone (Grinspoon song) =

Single by Grinspoon

from the album Thrills, Kills & Sunday Pills
- Released: 4 November 2004
- Recorded: 2004
- Genre: Alternative rock
- Length: 3:55
- Label: Universal Records
- Songwriter(s): Pat Davern, Phil Jamieson, Scott Russo
- Producer(s): Howard Benson

Grinspoon singles chronology
"'Hard Act to Follow'" (2004)	"Better Off Alone" (2004)	"'Hold on Me'" (2005)

"Better Off Alone" is a song by Grinspoon which was released as the second single from their fourth studio album Thrills, Kills & Sunday Pills.

The song peaked at No. 30 on the ARIA Singles Chart and polled at No. 26 on Triple J's Hottest 100 of 2004.

== Track listing ==
All tracks are written by Phil Jamieson, except as shown

No.	Title	Length
1.	"Better Off Alone"	3:55
2.	"Angel In the Sand"	3:57
3.	"Souvenir"	3:11
4.	"Sold My Soul"	3:09

== Charts ==
Chart (2004/05)	Peak position
Australia (ARIA)	30
