= Six to Midnight =

Studio album by Grinspoon
- Released: 11 September 2009
- Recorded: 2009
- Genre: Post-grunge, alternative metal
- Label: Chk Chk Boom, Universal Music
- Producer: Rick Will & Grinspoon

Grinspoon chronology
Alibis & Other Lies (2007)	Six to Midnight (2009)	Black Rabbits (2012)

Singles from Six to Midnight
- 1. "Dogs (radio single)" Released: 2009; 2. "Comeback" Released: 4 September 2009; 3. "Summer" Released: 2009; 4. "Premonitions" Released: 7 May 2010

Professional ratings
Review scores
Source	Rating
The Border Mail	3/5 stars
Dead Press	8/10 stars
The Dwarf	(mixed)
The Mercury	3.5/5 stars
Mess and Noise	(unfavorable)
Uber Rock	(favorable)

Six to Midnight is the sixth studio album by Australian post-grunge band Grinspoon, released through Chk Chk Boom Records and Universal Music on 11 September 2009. "Dogs" was the first song made available to the public, being released for free over the internet before the album's release. "Comeback" is the album's first single.

The album debuted at number six on the Australian Albums Chart. The first official single, "Comeback", peaked at number 48 on the Australian Singles Chart.

Six to Midnight was produced by Rick Will (Johnny Cash, No Doubt, Nine Inch Nails), with the band returning to their home town of Byron Bay to record the album. Will also mixed the album.

The album has been the first Grinspoon release since 2002's New Detention to gain international release dates, starting off with Japan in early 2010 and the United Kingdom in February 2011.

The title of the album, according to guitarist Pat Davern, came after drummer, Kristian Hopes, saw a scene in Forgetting Sarah Marshall where Russell Brand is singing, "Inside of You", and Jonah Hill sticks his hand down his pants, adjusts himself and says 'Dude, I just went from six to midnight.'

== Track listing ==
1. "Dogs" – 3:07
2. "Run" – 3:07
3. "Comeback" – 3:07
4. "Takes One" – 3:22
5. "Premonitions" – 3:22
6. "Right Now" – 3:29
7. "Give You More" – 4:06
8. "Lockdown" – 3:27
9. "Tonight" – 3:40
10. "Passenger" – 3:43
11. "Innocence" – 3:21
12. "Surrender" – 3:31
13. "Summer" – 3:34

iTunes bonus track

14. "Progress" - 3:18

Getmusic preorder exclusive

14. "Tourist Season" - 3:37

UK bonus tracks

14. "Progress" - 3:18
15. "Tourist Season" - 3:37
16. "Strange Days" - 2:58
17. "60 Sign" - 2:48
18. "Champion (Rick Will Mix)" - 2:51

Japan edition

1. "Run"
2. "Comeback"
3. "Takes One"
4. "Strange Days"
5. "Summer"
6. "Premonitions"
7. "Right Now"
8. "Give You More"
9. "Dogs"
10. "Passenger"
11. "Surrender"
12. "Tonight"
13. "Innocence"
14. "60 Sign (bonus track)"

== Charts ==
=== Weekly charts ===
Chart (2009)	Peak position
Australian Albums (ARIA)	6

=== Year-end charts ===
Chart (2009)	Position
Australian Artist Albums Chart	40
