= Whatever, Whatever =

Studio album by Grinspoon
- Released: 9 August 2024
- Length: 35:39
- Label: Grinspoon; Universal
- Producer: Oscar Dawson

Grinspoon chronology
Chemical Hearts (2019)	Whatever, Whatever (2024)

Singles from Whatever, Whatever
- 1. "Unknown Pretenders" Released: 19 May 2024; 2. "Never Say Never" Released: 16 July 2024; 3. "The Only One" Released: 9 August 2024

Whatever, Whatever is the eighth studio album by Australian post-grunge band Grinspoon. The album was announced in May 2024 and released on 9 August 2024. The album will be supported with the 45-date Whatever, Whenever, Wherever tour.

At the 2024 ARIA Music Awards, the album was nominated for Best Rock Album.

== Reception ==
Al Newstead from Double J said "This album maintains Grinspoon's enduringly successful reputation as flag-bearers of Australian rock music" calling the album "Just ace".

== Track listing ==
Whatever, Whatever track listing
No.	Title	Length
1.	"..."	0:46
2.	"(ILYSM)"	1:36
3.	"Unknown Pretenders"	2:39
4.	"Nasty"	2:59
5.	"Pantomime"	0:33
6.	"Never Say Never"	2:45
7.	"Live Fast, Die Young"	3:51
8.	"Trains"	0:45
9.	"4,5 & 7"	3:35
10.	"This Love"	3:33
11.	"Blood On the Snow"	3:06
12.	"The Only One"	3:07
13.	"A Minute"	0:42
14.	"Can I Make You Feel?"	2:30
15.	"Underground"	3:25
Total length:		35:39

== Charts ==
=== Weekly charts ===
Weekly chart performance for Whatever, Whatever
Chart (2024)	Peak position
Australian Albums (ARIA)	3

=== Year-end charts ===
2024 year-end chart performance for Whatever, Whatever
Chart (2024)	Position
Australian Artist Albums (ARIA)	48
