= Panic Attack (EP) =

EP by Grinspoon; includes hit cover track

EP by Grinspoon
- Released: 10 March 2003
- Recorded: 2002
- Genre: Post-grunge
- Length: 15:19
- Label: Universal
- Producer: Phil McKellar

Grinspoon chronology
New Detention (2002)	Panic Attack (2003)	Thrills, Kills & Sunday Pills (2004)

Panic Attack is an EP released by the Australian rock band Grinspoon in March 2003. The EP was originally released by itself, but also appeared as a bonus disc with a re-release version of an earlier studio album, New Detention, on 10 March 2003. The EP was developed after Grinspoon recorded a cover of the INXS hit, "Don't Change" for the soundtrack of an Australian film, Danny Deckchair (May 2003). Its recording and release were relatively rushed between New Detention's first appearance in June 2002 and their next studio album Thrills, Kills & Sunday Pills in September 2004.

Band member Pat Davern described the four tracks to Greg Lawrence of WHAMMO website: for "Don't Change" he said "We did the cover, basically for Livid", the group had appeared at that festival in the previous October–November; "Off Piste" was "a new track"; while both "Boredom" and "Fall Away" were "B-sides from the New Detention sessions. We decided to hang on to them for whatever we released in the future". The band supported its appearance with their Don't Panic Tour, using 28 Days as a support act. Panic Attack reached No. 13 on the ARIA Singles Chart

== Track listing ==
1. "Don't Change" (INXS cover) – 3:51
2. "Off Piste" – 3:46
3. "Boredom" – 3:22
4. "Fall Away" – 4:20

== Charts ==
Chart (2003)	Peak position
Australia (ARIA)	13
