= Licker Bottle Cozy =

EP by Grinspoon
- Released: 16 December 1996
- Recorded: July 1996; Ultimo Studios (Sydney)
- Genre: Post-grunge; Alternative metal
- Length: 13:35
- Label: Grudge (MCA), Universal
- Producer: Grinspoon, Phil McKellar

Grinspoon chronology
Grinspoon (1995)	Licker Bottle Cozy (1996)	Guide to Better Living (1997)

Licker Bottle Cozy, was the second EP by the Australian rock band Grinspoon. The EP was initially released by Grudge Records Australia (a sub-label of MCA Australia) on 16 December 1996. It was recorded by Phil McKellar in July of that year and was of a significantly better sound quality than their first EP. Two of the tracks, "Post Enebriated Anxiety" and "Champion" were included unchanged in their debut album Guide to Better Living. It was released in the United States by Universal Records in March 1997. The EP reached No. 65 on the ARIA Singles Chart in January 1997 and No. 25 on the CMJ's 'Metal Top 25' in 1998.

== History ==
A few months after the band had won national youth broadcaster, Triple J's inaugural Unearthed competition they signed with Brisbane independent record label, Oracle, who gave them a distribution deal. Grinspoon recorded their debut self-titled EP in two days at Grevillia Studios in Brisbane.

After parting ways with their first manager they started working with Apollo Artist Management. They recorded Licker Bottle Cozy in July 1996 at ABC's Ultimo Studios in Sydney, with Phil McKellar, who had produced their first single, "Sickfest". The EP was self-financed from the money the band had earned from performing endlessly. They were planning to release it through Oracle but just before they were about to send the master disc off to be pressed, MCA (Australia)'s new label Grudge picked them up and signed them.

The artwork is comic book inspired with some pictures of band members arranged in a collage. The CD itself has written on it "Use By 31 Dec 96", and since that date the EP has not been widely available and can only be purchased from the Grinspoon website.

== Reception ==
Stephen Elerwine (AllMusic) describes it as "a promising debut from the Australian metal combo that demonstrates their way with a riff. Occasionally, their songs don't amount to much more than hard-hitting riffs, but they have an appealingly tough sound and memorable hooks that make them ones to watch."

== Track listing ==
All tracks are written by Phil Jamieson, except as noted

No.	Title	Length
1.	"Post Enebriated Anxiety" (Phil Jamieson, Pat Davern)	2:38
2.	"Pig Pen"	2:20
3.	"Champion" (Phil Jamieson, Joe Hansen)	2:42
4.	"Butcher"	3:58
5.	"Freezer" (Phil Jamieson, Fiona Jamieson)	1:57

== Charts ==
Chart (1997)	Peak position
Australia (ARIA Charts)	65

== Releases ==
Format	Country	Label	Catalogue No.	Year
CD	AUS	Grunge/MCA (Australia)	MCD 73025	1996
7" vinyl	AUS	Grunge/MCA (Australia)	MCV73025	1996
CD	US	Universal	UD-53151	1997

== Personnel ==
Grinspoon

- Pat Davern - guitar
- Joe Hansen - bass
- Kristian Hopes - drums
- Phil Jamieson - vocals

Credits

- Don Bartley - mastering
- Phil McKellar - producer, recording, sound engineering
