= Thrills, Kills & Sunday Pills =

Thrills, Kills + Sunday Pills

Studio album by Grinspoon
- Released: 20 September 2004
- Recorded: November 2003 – June 2004
- Venue: Los Angeles, California
- Genre: Post-grunge, alternative rock
- Length: 46:45
- Label: Universal
- Producer: Howard Benson

Grinspoon chronology
Panic Attack (2003)	Thrills, Kills + Sunday Pills (2004)	Best in Show (2005)

Singles from Thrills, Kills + Sunday Pills
- 1. "Hard Act to Follow" Released: 9 August 2004; 2. "Better Off Alone" Released: 4 November 2004; 3. "Hold on Me" Released: 21 February 2005; 4. "Bleed You Dry" Released: 13 June 2005

Thrills, Kills + Sunday Pills is the fourth studio album by Australian alternative rock band, Grinspoon. It was released on 20 September 2004 by record label, Universal Music, with Howard Benson producing. On the ARIA Albums Chart it peaked at No. 4; ARIA certified the album as platinum for shipment of 70,000 units.

At the ARIA Music Awards of 2005 it won Best Rock Album.

Four singles were issued: "Hard Act to Follow" (August 2004), "Better Off Alone" (November), "Hold on Me" (February 2005) and "Bleed You Dry" (June).

== Background ==
Grinspoon's fourth studio album, Thrills, Kills + Sunday Pills, marked another change in their musical direction – their third album, New Detention (June 2002), had been more commercial than their earlier work. The band's founding mainstays are Pat Davern on guitar, Joe Hansen on bass guitar, Kristian Hopes on drums and Phil Jamieson on lead vocals and guitar. They recorded the new album in Los Angeles with Howard Benson (Motorhead, Sepultura) producing.

Ed Nimmervoll of HowlSpace remarked that for the recording they had "deliberately put aside any song that sounded typical Grinspoon, Benson encouraged the band to keep things simple and concentrate on the songs in their own right. The result was the 'Poppy-est" album of [their] career. They knew that some of their hardcore fans would initially find the album difficult to accept."

Thrills, Kills + Sunday Pills was released on 20 September 2004 by record label Universal. Four singles were released from the album: "Hard Act to Follow" (August 2004), "Better Off Alone" (November), "Hold on Me" (February 2005) and Bleed You Dry (June). Grinspoon had started their tour in support of "Hard Act to Follow" on 26 August 2004 and continued to 4 September.

== Reception ==
Thrills, Kills + Sunday Pills peaked at No. 4 on the ARIA Albums Chart, and by December was certified platinum for shipment of 70,000 copies. The lead single, "Hard Act to Follow", reached No. 24 on the related ARIA Singles Chart, with "Better Off Alone" and "Hold on Me" both appearing in the top 50; the final single, "Bleed You Dry", peaked in the top 100. At the ARIA Music Awards of 2005 it won Best Rock Album and was nominated for Best Group.

As of 2008, the album has gained mostly positive reviews due to it containing the pop of New Detention while placing themselves in a more teen-oriented direction. Undercover's Tim Cashmere felt that "[it] ain't too shabby for your average everyday Grinspoon fan, but if you're not a Grinspoon fan by now, this album won't change your mind." He noted that Benson's contribution "didn't come through so much in the actual song writing or structure of the album, more in the great sounding guitars that he brought through in the band… something the band had been almost hitting, but never quite achieved until now."

== Track listing ==
All tracks are written by Phil Jamieson and Pat Davern, unless otherwise shown

No.	Title	Length
1.	"Hard Act to Follow"	3:27
2.	"Hold on Me"	2:45
3.	"Choke" (Jamieson, Joe Hansen)	4:27
4.	"Bleed You Dry" (Jamieson, Hansen)	3:26
5.	"Enemy"	4:48
6.	"Rising Tide" (Jamieson)	4:23
7.	"Better Off Alone" (Jamieson, Davern, Scott Russo)	3:53
8.	"Kiss It" (Jamieson, Hansen)	3:26
9.	"She's Leaving Tuesday" (Jamieson)	4:00
10.	"Nylon" (Jamieson)	3:37
11.	"Hideaway" (Jamieson, Russo)	3:39
12.	"Replacements"	4:26

== Personnel ==
Grinspoon members

- Pat Davern – lead guitar
- Joe Hansen – bass guitar
- Kristian Hopes – drums
- Phil Jamieson – lead vocals, guitar

Additional musicians

- Paul DeCarli – keyboards
- Keith Nelson – guitar technician
- Jon Nicholson – drum technician

Production

- Howard Benson – producer
- Paul DeCarli – editing, programming
- Eric Miller – assistant engineer
- Mike Plotnikoff – recording, mixing
- Steve Smart – mastering

Art work

- Michael Spiccia – design, art direction
- Yvonne Armstrong, Uri Auerbach, Simon Upton – photography

== Charts ==
=== Weekly charts ===
Chart (2004)	Peak position
Australian Albums (ARIA)	4

=== Year-end charts ===
Chart (2004)	Position
Australian Albums (ARIA)	68
Chart (2005)	Position
Australian Albums (ARIA)	98

== Certifications ==
Region	Certification	Certified units/sales
Australia (ARIA)	Platinum	70,000^{^}
^{^} Shipments figures based on certification alone.
