= New Detention =

- Original album cover

Studio album by Grinspoon
- Released: 3 June 2002
- Recorded: September 2001 – January 2002
- Genre: Post-grunge, alternative metal
- Length: 40:37
- Label: Grudge
- Producer: Phil McKellar

Grinspoon chronology
Easy (1999)	New Detention (2002)	Panic Attack (2003)

Alternative cover
- Re-release cover

Singles from New Detention
- 1. "Chemical Heart" Released: 4 February 2002; 2. "Lost Control" Released: 12 May 2002; 3. "No Reason" Released: 20 September 2002; 4. "1000 Miles" Released: 18 August 2003

New Detention is the third studio album by Australian alternative rock band Grinspoon. It was released in 2002 by record label Grudge, which peaked at No. 2 on the ARIA Albums Chart. By December that year it was certified platinum for shipment of 70,000 units.

== Content ==
The ballad "Chemical Heart" marked a change in focus for the band towards a more mature, mainstream sound. This change would become more apparent on their next album, Thrills, Kills & Sunday Pills (2004), however, New Detention did contain songs in the classic Grinspoon style to appeal to fans of their previous work, such as the songs "Boltcutter" and "Killswitch".

=== Album cover ===
The original cover featured a target range over a classroom with empty desks, which was misinterpreted by some as promoting terrorism. However, the photo had to be changed due to copyright issues as the band had unknowingly licensed the photo for only 5,000 copies. Complaints to Grudge's parent company Universal Records and Grinspoon about the terrorism misinterpretation and the copyright issues led the artwork to be changed for the re-release. The album was re-released with a changed cover, featuring the band in green.

== Release ==
New Detention was released on 3 June 2002 by record label Grudge. It peaked at No. 2 on the ARIA album charts.

The album provided four singles: "Chemical Heart", "Lost Control", "No Reason" and "1000 Miles". These singles had a strong showing in the Triple J Hottest 100 of 2002, with the tracks listed at numbers 2, 14, 15 and 47, respectively.

The 2003 re-release of the album included a bonus CD that contained the tracks from the Panic Attack EP, which is now unavailable individually. The album was re-released again without the bonus CD on 19 July 2004. Additionally, New Detention was released in the United States, due to its popularity in Australia, but only as an import. However, in the United Kingdom, New Detention was released as a full release.

== Reception ==
The album gained mostly positive reviews due to its change in sound, but gained more negative reviews from the fans, saying that the band was becoming more commercial and less like their Easy era counterparts.

In the United Kingdom, the album gained mixed reviews.

== Track listing ==
All tracks are written by Phil Jamieson and Pat Davern, except where noted

No.	Title	Writer(s)	Length
1.	"Intro"		0:44
2.	"Anyday, Anyhow"	Jamieson, Ben White	3:28
3.	"Lost Control"		3:29
4.	"Gone Tomorrow"		3:27
5.	"Chemical Heart"		4:39
6.	"Make It Happen"	Jamieson	4:05
7.	"Boltcutter"	Jamieson / Joe Hansen	3:22
8.	"No Reason"	Jamieson / Nick Wright	3:49
9.	"Killswitch"		3:32
10.	"1000 Miles"		2:21
11.	"Damn Straight"	Jamieson / Hansen	3:54
12.	"Hate"	Jamieson	3:39

2004 edition bonus track
No.	Title	Length
13.	"Don't Change"	3:49

2003 edition bonus disc: Panic Attack
No.	Title	Length
1.	"Don't Change"
2.	"Off Piste"
3.	"Boredom"
4.	"Fall Away"

== Charts ==
=== Weekly charts ===
Chart (2002)	Peak position
Australian Albums (ARIA)	2

=== Year-end charts ===
Chart (20002)	Position
Australian Albums Chart	33

== Certifications ==
Region	Certification	Certified units/sales
Australia (ARIA)	2× Platinum	140,000^{^}
^{^} Shipments figures based on certification alone.
