= Ready 1 =

Single by Grinspoon

from the album Easy
- Released: 18 October 1999
- Recorded: September 1999
- Genre: Alternative metal
- Length: 2:34
- Label: Universal Records
- Songwriters: Phil Jamieson, Pat Davern
- Producer: Jonathon Burnside

Grinspoon singles chronology
"'Don't Go Away'" (1998)	"Ready 1" (1999)	"'Rock Show'" (1999)

"Ready 1" is a song by Australian rock band Grinspoon which was released 18 October 1999 as the lead single from their second studio album, Easy. It peaked at No. 36 on the ARIA Singles Chart. It was written by band members Phil Jamieson and Pat Davern. Jamieson has also performed the song as a solo artist.

== Track listing ==
All tracks are written by Phil Jamieson and Pat Davern, except as shown.

No.	Title	Writer(s)	Length
1.	"Ready 1"		2:36
2.	"New York Picture Show"	Phil Jamieson	5:09
3.	"Ready 1 (Demo)"		2:34
4.	"Ready 1 (Drunken Lounge Version)"		2:53
Total length:			12:32

== Charts ==
Chart (1999)	Peak position
Australia (ARIA)	36
