= Pushing Buttons =

1998 EP by Grinspoon

EP by Grinspoon
- Released: 21 September 1998
- Recorded: July 1998
- Genre: Alternative metal, post-grunge
- Length: 16:52
- Label: Universal
- Producer: Phil McKellar, Ulrich Wild

Grinspoon chronology
Guide to Better Living (1998)	Pushing Buttons (1998)	Easy (1999)

Professional ratings
Review scores
Source	Rating
Sputnikmusic	3.8/5 stars

Pushing Buttons is the third extended play by Australian alternative rock band Grinspoon, and was released on 21 September 1998 via Universal Records. It peaked at number 13 on the ARIA Singles Chart.

== History and release ==
In March 1998, Grinspoon moved to Los Angeles and spent much of the year touring the US and Canada, including opening for Creed, Lit, Godsmack and Anthrax. While in the US, Grinspoon recorded two songs, "Black Friday" and "More Than You Are" with Ulrich Wild (White Zombie, Pantera, Strung Out), which formed the basis of Pushing Buttons. The band returned to Australia in September to release Pushing Buttons, which peaked at No. 13 on the ARIA Singles Chart. It also reached No. 80 on the ARIA End of Year Charts for 1998 and was certified gold.

Pushing Buttons was not released in the United States, but "Black Friday" and "More Than You Are" were included on the US version of Guide to Better Living and "Snap Your Fingers, Snap Your Neck" is on an ECW compilation released by Earache Records. "More Than You Are" was serviced to US mainstream and active rock radio on 29 June 1999.

== Content ==
Pushing Buttons features a heavier sound than their earlier work, with a metal-inspired re-recording of "More Than You Are" (previously recorded for the Green Album), and the songs "Black Friday" and "Snap Your Fingers, Snap Your Neck". "Snap Your Fingers, Break Your Neck" is a cover of a song by American heavy metal band Prong (which was included on that band's 1994 album, Cleansing). The other songs are a lot lighter. "Black Friday" received significant airplay and was voted in at No. 22 on the Triple J's Hottest 100 for 1998.

== Track listing ==
All tracks are written by Phil Jamieson and Pat Davern, except as shown

Pushing Buttons
No.	Title	Length
1.	"Black Friday"	2:28
2.	"More Than You Are"	3:11
3.	"Snap Your Fingers, Snap Your Neck" (Ted Parsons, Tommy Victor)	4:26
4.	"Busy"	2:27
5.	"Explain" (Phil Jamieson)	1:45
6.	"Black Friday" (Live)	2:34

== Charts ==
=== Weekly charts ===
Chart (1998)	Peak position
Australia (ARIA)	13

=== Year-end charts ===
Chart (1998)	Position
Australia (ARIA)	80

== Certifications ==
Region	Certification	Certified units/sales
Australia (ARIA)	Gold	35,000^{^}
^{^} Shipments figures based on certification alone.
