= Guide to Better Living =

Debut album by Australian rock band Grinspoon

Studio album by Grinspoon
- Released: 16 September 1997
- Recorded: February 1997, Rocking Horse Studios, Byron Bay
- Genre: Alternative metal, post-grunge, punk rock
- Length: 46:12
- Label: Grudge/Universal Music Australia
- Producer: Phillip McKellar

Grinspoon chronology
Licker Bottle Cozy (1996)	Guide to Better Living (1997)	Pushing Buttons (1998)

Singles from Guide to Better Living
- 1. "Pedestrian" Released: 14 July 1997; 2. "DC×3" Released: 11 August 1997; 3. "Repeat" Released: October 1997; 4. "Just Ace" Released: 1 February 1998; 5. "Don't Go Away" Released: 1 June 1998

Guide to Better Living is the debut studio album by Australian rock band Grinspoon. It was released on 16 September 1997 on the Grudge Records label (an imprint of Universal Music Australia) and was produced by Phil McKellar. The album reached number 11 on the ARIA Albums Chart and spent 36 weeks on the national charts. The album peaked at number 8 when re-released in 2017.

At the 1998 ARIA Music Awards, Grinspoon received a nomination in the category 'Breakthrough Artist – Album' for Guide to Better Living. The album achieved a platinum certification from ARIA. It generated five singles, "Pedestrian", "DC×3", "Repeat", "Just Ace" and "Don't Go Away"; with "Just Ace" and "DC×3" both reaching the top 50 on the ARIA Singles Chart. On 9 March 1999 a trimmed and reordered version of the album was issued for the North American market.

== Background ==
Guide to Better Living is the debut studio album by Australian alternative metal and post-grunge band Grinspoon. In 1995 the group formed in Lismore, New South Wales and are fronted by Phil Jamieson on vocals and guitar with Pat Davern on guitar, Joe Hansen on bass guitar and Kristian Hopes on drums. The group's second extended play, Licker Bottle Cozy, was recorded in June 1996 with Phil McKellar as producer.

In February 1997 the band recorded their debut album, with McKellar again, at Rockinghorse Studios in Byron Bay and mixed at Studios 301 in Sydney in April. The band considered the title, Sell Your Parents, but eventually decided on Guide to Better Living, after a 1960s catalogue of Sunbeam white goods. It had a slightly heavier sound than their earlier work. On 16 September 1997 they released the work on Grudge Records – an imprint of Universal Music Australia. It peaked at number 11 on the ARIA Albums Charts and by year's end it was certified platinum with shipment of over 70,000 units in Australia. At the ARIA Music Awards of 1998, Grinspoon received a nomination in the category 'Breakthrough Artist – Album' for Guide to Better Living. It represents the sound and variety of their early career with heavier songs like "Pressure Tested 1984" open the album, whilst in the middle are more classic rock songs like "Repeat" and "Don't Go Away" and then towards the end the ballad "Bad Funk Stripe."

In Australia a limited edition was issued with a bonus CD featuring the single version of "Just Ace", five live songs—illustrating the band's sense of humour and ability to play live—and a hidden track, the acoustic "Protest". The live tracks were recorded at Grudgefest in Sydney on Saturday 27 September 1997. The United States branch of Universal Records signed the band by late 1998 and released an altered version of Guide to Better Living on 9 March 1999. The cover was also modified with the band's name and album title written in a different style. The album sold over 12,000 copies in the US on the back of extensive touring by the band in North America with bands such as Creed, Lit, Godsmack and Anthrax. The group's second album, Easy followed in November 1999.

== Reception ==
Professional ratings
Review scores
Source	Rating
AllMusic	3/5 stars
WHAMMO	(positive)

According to the Worldwide Home of Australasian Music and More Online (WHAMMO), "[a]fter being discovered by Triple J and then signed by Grudge records, this was the album that hammered it home - Grinspoon were destined to be the most rock and roll party down aviator-shades-wearing Oz rock band of the late '90s".

== Track listing ==
All tracks are written by Phil Jamieson and Joe Hansen, except where noted

Australian version
No.	Title	Writer(s)	Length
1.	"Pressure Tested 1984"		2:46
2.	"Boundary"		2:33
3.	"DC X 3"	Jamieson; Pat Davern	2:55
4.	"Sickfest"	Jamieson; Davern	3:12
5.	"Railrider"		4:08
6.	"Scalped"	Jamieson	2:36
7.	"Pedestrian"		2:16
8.	"Just Ace"	Jamieson	1:48
9.	"Post Enebriated Anxiety"	Jamieson; Davern	2:38
10.	"Repeat"	Jamieson	3:18
11.	"NBT"		2:25
12.	"Don't Go Away"	Jamieson; Hansen; Davern	2:56
13.	"Balding Matters"		2:34
14.	"Bad Funk Stripe"	Jamieson	4:43
15.	"Champion"		2:42
16.	"Truk"	Jamieson; Davern	2:42
Total length:			46:12

Original release bonus tracks
No.	Title	Writer(s)	Length
17.	"More Than You Are" (live)	Jamieson	2:55
18.	"Freezer" (live)	Jamieson	2:04
19.	"Post Enebriated Anxiety" (live)	Jamieson; Davern	3:09
20.	"NBT" (live)		2:50
21.	"Just Ace" (live)	Jamieson	2:01
22.	"Protest" (hidden track)		1:22

Live at CBGB's New York 1997 – 20th anniversary deluxe edition
No.	Title	Writer(s)	Length
17.	"American Party Bomb"		2:12
18.	"Black Friday"	Jamieson; Davern	2:50
19.	"Pedestrian"		2:25
20.	"More Than You Are"	Jamieson	2:58
21.	"Butcher"		3:35
22.	"Post Enebriated Anxiety"	Jamieson; Davern	3:22
23.	"Just Ace"	Jamieson	1:58
24.	"All the Time"		2:31
25.	"Champion"		3:00
26.	"Freezer"	Jamieson	2:23

Re-release bonus EP
No.	Title	Writer(s)	Length
1.	"Just Ace" (single version)	Jamieson	1:48
2.	"Grudgefest Intro" (live)		0:34
3.	"More Than You Are" (live)	Jamieson	2:55
4.	"Freezer" (live)	Jamieson	2:04
5.	"Post Enebriated Anxiety" (live)	Jamieson; Davern	3:09
6.	"NBT" (live)		2:50
7.	"Just Ace" (live)	Jamieson	2:01
8.	"Protest" (hidden track)		1:22
Total length:			16:43

B-Sides / Rarities – 20th anniversary deluxe edition bonus disc
No.	Title	Writer(s)	Length
1.	"Pig Pen"	Jamieson	2:21
2.	"Butcher"	Jamieson	3:58
3.	"Freezer"	Jamieson	1:59
4.	"Green Grass Meadow" (previously unreleased)	Jamieson; Davern	2:50
5.	"Fuck Truk"		2:52
6.	"Fire Engine Man"	Jamieson; Hansen; Davern; Kristian Hopes	3:01
7.	"Pedestrian" (Roadkill Mix)		3:23
8.	"Ambulance"	Jamieson; Davern	2:42
9.	"Champion" (Groove Terminator Remix)		3:14
10.	"Railrider" (The Hypnotic Mix)		4:59

Live at Falls Festival 1997 – 20th anniversary deluxe edition bonus disc
No.	Title	Writer(s)	Length
11.	"Champion"		3:19
12.	"Don't Go Away"	Jamieson; Hansen; Davern	2:59
13.	"Pedestrian"		2:42
14.	"More Than You Are"	Jamieson	2:49
15.	"Repeat"	Jamieson	3:18
16.	"Boundary"		2:50
17.	"American Party Bomb"		2:36
18.	"Just Ace"	Jamieson	1:46
19.	"Post Enebriated Anxiety"	Jamieson; Davern	3:30
20.	"Untitled"		2:21
21.	"Freezer"	Jamieson	2:56
22.	"DCx3"	Jamieson; Davern	3:21
23.	"Dr Grinspoon"	Jamieson; Davern	3:19

American version
No.	Title	Writer(s)	Length
1.	"PostEnebriatedAnxiety"	Jamieson; Davern	2:37
2.	"Black Friday"	Jamieson; Davern	2:29
3.	"Dead Cat X 3"	Jamieson; Davern	2:54
4.	"More Than You Are"	Jamieson	3:10
5.	"Railrider"		4:02
6.	"Pressure Tested"		2:46
7.	"Repeat"	Jamieson	3:16
8.	"Champion"		2:41
9.	"Pedestrian"		2:14
10.	"NBT"		2:25
11.	"Bad Funk Stripe"	Jamieson	4:41
12.	"Scalped"	Jamieson	2:35
13.	"Boundary"		2:31
14.	"Truk"	Jamieson; Davern	2:43
15.	"Sickfest"	Jamieson; Davern	3:12
Total length:			44:17

== Personnel ==
Grinspoon members

- Phil Jamieson – vocals, guitar
- Pat Davern – guitar
- Joe Hansen – bass guitar
- Kristian Hopes – drums

Additional musicians

- Ted Reiger – keyboards

Production details

- Producer – Phillip McKellar, Grinspoon, Ulrich Wild
- Engineer – Phillip McKellar, Ulrich Wild
  - Assistant engineer – Greg Courtney, Flip Osman, Chris Riband
- Mastering – Ron Baker, Tom Baker
- Mixing – Phillip McKellar, Ulrich Wild
  - Mixing assistant – Flip Osman, Chris Riband
- Studio – Rocking Horse Studios

Art works

- Photography – Paul Blackmore, Sophie Howarth, Stephen Stickler

== Charts ==
=== Weekly charts ===
Chart (1997–2017)	Peak position
Australian Albums (ARIA)	8

=== Year-end charts ===
Chart (1997)	Position
Australian Albums Chart	94
Chart (1998)	Position
Australian Albums Chart	64

== Certifications ==
Region	Certification	Certified units/sales
Australia (ARIA)	2× Platinum	140,000^{^}
^{^} Shipments figures based on certification alone.

== Releases ==
Format	Country	Label	Catalogue No.	Release date
CD	AUS	Grudge/Universal	UMD73086 (A limited edition CD was also released which included an 8-track bonus CD)	16 September 1997
CD	AUS	Grudge/Universal	UMD73109	20 July 1998
CD	US	Universal	UD-53250	9 March 1999
