= Easy (Grinspoon album) =

Studio album by Grinspoon
- Released: 1 November 1999
- Recorded: August–September 1999
- Genre: Alternative metal; nu metal; post-grunge
- Length: 50:16
- Label: Universal
- Producer: Jonathan Burnside

Grinspoon chronology
Pushing Buttons (1998)	Easy (1999)	New Detention (2002)

Singles from Easy
- 1. "Ready 1" Released: 18 October 1999; 2. "Secrets" Released: January 2000; 3. "Rock Show" Released: 5 May 2000; 4. "Violent and Lazy" Released: 13 November 2000

Easy is the second studio album released by the Australian rock band Grinspoon. It was released on 1 November 1999, debuting at No. 4 on the Australian album charts and remaining in the top 50 for 13 weeks. It eventually achieved platinum sales in Australia.

Work on the album began in August 1999 with the producer Jonathan Burnside (Nirvana, Melvins, Depeche Mode, Meat Beat Manifesto). The album was recorded in Sydney and mixed in Melbourne. The initial release of the album included a bonus disc containing eleven live tracks from the band's New Year's Eve performance at the 1998 Falls Festival.

Four singles were released from the album, "Ready 1", "Secrets", "Rock Show" and "Violent and Lazy", of which "Ready 1" charted in the ARIA Singles Chart at No. 36, "Secrets" at No. 83 and "Rock Show" at No. 78. "Ready 1" was voted in at No. 33 on Triple J's Hottest 100 for 1999, with "Rock Show" and "Secrets" both polling on Triple J's Hottest 100 for 2000, where they reached No. 33 and No. 73 respectively.

The album received two nominations at the Aria Awards in 2000, "Best Rock Album" and "Engineer of the Year".

== Reception ==
Easy gained positive reviews from outlets such as Sputnik Media and Rolling Stone Australia. According to the Worldwide Home of Australasian Music and More Online (WHAMMO), Easy "finds [Grinspoon] in great grungy form with such tracks as 'American Party Bomb', 'Undercover', 'Secrets' and the excellent 'Ordinary' — a word which has nothing to do with this disc".

=== Professional reviews ===
Professional ratings
Review scores
Source	Rating
Ultimate Guitar	7.3 stars on a 10 point scale
Sputnik Music	4.1 stars on a 5 point scale

== Track listing ==
No.	Title	Writer(s)	Length
1.	"American Party Bomb"	Phil Jamieson/Joe Hansen	2:05
2.	"Ready 1"	Jamieson/Pat Davern	2:36
3.	"Undercover"	Jamieson/Davern/Hansen	3:47
4.	"Tang"	Jamieson	3:19
5.	"Secrets"	Jamieson/Davern	3:08
6.	"Ordinary"	Jamieson/Hansen	2:39
7.	"Rock Show"	Jamieson/Davern/Burnside	4:08
8.	"Overdriver"	Davern/Hansen	5:17
9.	"Better Off Dead"	Jamieson	3:21
10.	"Violent and Lazy"	Jamieson	3:33
11.	"All the Time"	Jamieson/Hansen	1:59
12.	"Yarni Marni"	Jamieson/Hansen	1:48
13.	"Signpost"	Jamieson/Davern/Hansen	3:26
14.	"Dial Tone"	Jamieson	9:33
15.	"That Guy's a Fuckwit" (hidden track)

Bonus disc - Live at the Falls '98
No.	Title	Length
1.	"American Party Bomb" (live)
2.	"Black Friday" (live)
3.	"Pedestrian" (live)
4.	"More Than You Are" (live)
5.	"Butcher" (live)
6.	"Ready 1" (live)
7.	"Repeat" (live)
8.	"Boundary" (live)
9.	"Just Ace" (live)
10.	"PEA" (live)
11.	"DCX3" (live)

== Charts ==
=== Weekly charts ===
Chart (1999/2000)	Peak position
Australian Albums (ARIA)	4

=== Year-end charts ===
Chart (1999)	Position
Australian Albums Chart	64

== Certifications ==
Region	Certification	Certified units/sales
Australia (ARIA)	Platinum	70,000^{^}
^{^} Shipments figures based on certification alone.

== Releases ==
Format	Country	Label	Catalogue no.	Release date
CD	AUS	Grudge/Universal (Limited edition release - includes bonus CD)	542 097-2	November 1999
CD	AUS	Grudge/Universal	542 097-2	November 1999
CD	US	Universal	5420972	2002
