= Chemical Heart =

2002 single by Grinspoon

Single by Grinspoon

from the album New Detention
- Released: 4 February 2002
- Length: 4:39
- Label: Universal
- Songwriter: Grinspoon
- Producer: Phil McKeller

Grinspoon singles chronology
| "Violent and Lazy" (2000) | "Chemical Heart" (2002) | "Lost Control" (2002) |

"Chemical Heart" is the first single from Australian rock band Grinspoon's third studio album, New Detention. The song was written as a tribute to Jessica Michalik, who was crushed to death at the Sydney Big Day Out in 2001 during the Limp Bizkit set. It reached No. 25 on the Australian Singles Chart on 31 March 2002. The song was used in the Network Ten series premiere promos for Law & Order: Criminal Intent. The song was voted number two on Triple J's annual Hottest 100 for 2002. In 2025, the song placed at number 68 on the Hottest 100 of Australian Songs.

== Track listing ==
Australian CD single

1. "Chemical Heart" – 4:40
2. "Waiting for Take Off" – 2:51
3. "Gettin' Shit" – 2:27
4. "Chemical Heart" (acoustic mix) – 4:39

== Charts ==
| Chart (2002) | Peak position |
|---|---|
| Australia (ARIA) | 25 |
