= Phil McKellar =

Australian record producer

- Born: Phillip Jeffrey McKellar
- Occupations: Record producer, audio angineer
- Years active: 1980–present

Phillip Jeffrey McKellar is an Australian record producer and audio engineer. At the ARIA Music Awards McKellar has received nine nominations in the categories of either Producer of the Year or Engineer of the Year. These include Spiderbait's Ivy and the Big Apples (1997, engineer), The Cruel Sea's "Hard Times" (1998, producer), Spiderbait's Grand Slam (1999, engineer, producer), Grinspoon's New Detention (2002, engineer, producer), Sunk Loto's Between Birth and Death (2004, producer), and Something with Numbers' Perfect Distraction (2007, producer).

== Biography ==
In 1980 Phil McKellar started working at the Australian Broadcasting Commission (later renamed as Australian Broadcasting Corporation). In 1982 a fellow worker, Steve Adam, invited him to join an experimental music outfit, the Informatics, alongside Ramesh Ayar, Valek Sadovchikoff and Michael Trudgeon. Trudgeon explained their stance "We were driven by a love of the possibilities of what synthesizers and sequencers could do... Quite often the songs were shaped by the textures and rhythms that this new and exciting technology could generate. I think we were more interested in what we could experiment with rather than compete with well-established genres. The future looked exciting." In August 1982 McKellar issued a solo track, "Some Good Things to Do", which was compiled on a give-away cassette, Fast Forward 12, with Fast Forward Magazine.

From 1990 to 2000 McKellar worked as live music producer for national youth radio station, Triple J. McKellar later recalled "I'd been recording a lot of stuff for Triple J – Nirvana, Pearl Jam and Red Hot Chili Peppers." In April 1994 a demo version of "Tomorrow" by Newcastle teen band, Silverchair, won the Pick Me competition. McKellar produced the group's debut single at the Triple J studios in Sydney, he remembered "It sounded amazing and it was a strong song and as it got whittled down [from its original seven minutes] it focused it more and more... I guess it was obvious to me there was definitely talent involved." From 30 October 1994 it peaked at No. 1 for six weeks on the ARIA Singles Chart. At the ARIA Music Awards of 1995 "Tomorrow" won Single of the Year, Highest Selling Single, and Breakthrough Artist – Single. McKellar was nominated as Producer of the Year.

McKellar worked as a producer and sound engineer at Hardboiled Productions (1996-2010). He has also worked with many rock bands such as Dirty Three, The Mark Of Cain, Frenzal Rhomb, The Butterfly Effect, Kisschasy, Ash, The Sunpilots, Tumbleweed, Nitocris, One Dollar Short, The Getaway Plan, The Hot Lies, Crash Arcadia and Chasing Gravity. He then worked at ABC Radio National as an audio engineer, and Double J until 2023.

== Discography ==
- The Lure of the Tropics – Dave Graney with the Coral Snakes (live album, July 1992, producer) Torn & Frayed Records (TORN CD1)
- Stompen Ground – Various Artists (live album, 1993, producer) ABC Music
- "Tomorrow" – Silverchair (September 1994, engineer, producer)
- Ivy and the Big Apples – Spiderbait (October 1996, engineer, producer) Universal/Polydor
- Licker Bottle Cozy – Grinspoon (EP, December 1996, engineer, producer) Grudge Records/MCA/Universal
- Guide to Better Living – Grinspoon (engineer, mixer, producer, September 1997) Grudge/Universal (UMD73086)
- "Hard Times" – The Cruel Sea (February 1998, producer)
- Pushing Buttons – Grinspoon (EP, September 1998, producer)
- Grand Slam – Spiderbait (April 1999, engineer, producer) Polydor Records
- Big Picture Lies – Sunk Loto (producer, October 2000) Epic/Sony Music
- New Detention – Grinspoon (June 2002, engineer, producer) Grudge Records
- Between Birth and Death – Sunk Loto (producer, November 2003) Sony Music
- Receiving Transmission – One Dollar Short (2004, producer) Rapido Records (30D0D511-D784-4AED-B84C-4281FD441DBF)
- Perfect Distraction – Something with Numbers (October 2006) Below Par/EMI
