= Grudge Records =

- Parent company: Universal Music Australia
- Founded: 1996
- Distributor(s): Universal Music Australia
- Genre: Rock
- Country of origin: Australia
- Location: Sydney

Grudge Records was the Australian record label for Universal Music Australia that mostly promoted Australian rock artists, such as Grinspoon, Skunkhour, and Powderfinger. Other artists include H-Block 101 and Sean Ikin.

== Grudgefest ==
Grudgefest was a free all ages, non-alcohol event held at Prince Alfred Park in Sydney on 27 September 1997 and organised by Universal Music Australia and Grudge Records. Acts included Bush, Veruca Salt, Bloodhound Gang and Grinspoon. Approximately 20,000 people attended with all money raised at the concert going to the Sydney City Mission to assist homeless people in Australia.

== Artists ==
The following is a list of artists who have had releases issued by Grudge Records:

- Beasts of Bourbon
- Cactus Child
- The Clouds
- The Cruel Sea
- Dave Graney 'n' the Coral Snakes
- Grinspoon
- H-Block 101
- Killer Dwarfs (Stand Tall)
- Sean Ikin
- Tex Perkins
- Powderfinger
- The Screaming Jets
- Spiderbait
- Skunkhour
- Tumbleweed
