= Grinspoon =

Australian rock band

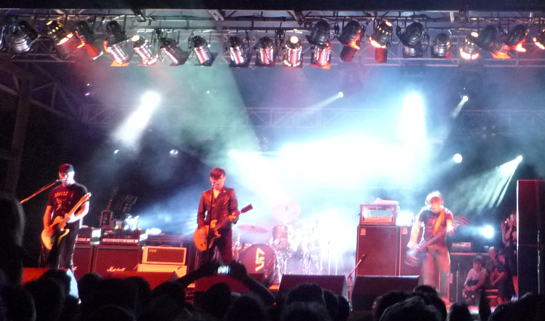
- Grinspoon performing at the 2009 Tour Press Shot

Background information
- Origin: Lismore, New South Wales, Australia
- Genres: Alternative rock, post-grunge, alternative metal, pop rock
- Years active: 1995–2013, 2015, 2017–present
- Labels: Universal, Grudge, Oracle, Chk Chk Boom
- Members: Pat Davern; Joe Hansen; Kristian Hopes; Phil Jamieson
- Website: grinspoon.com.au

Grinspoon are an Australian rock band from Lismore, New South Wales, who formed in 1995 by Pat Davern on guitar, Joe Hansen on bass guitar, Kristian Hopes on drums and Phil Jamieson on vocals and guitar. Also in that year, Grinspoon won the national youth radio, Triple J–sponsored Unearthed competition for Lismore, with their post-grunge song "Sickfest". The band's name references Lester Grinspoon, an associate professor emeritus of psychiatry at Harvard Medical School, who supported marijuana for medical use.

All eight of Grinspoon's studio albums have reached the ARIA albums chart top 10. Their sound changed to mainstream rock with the release of their third studio album, New Detention (2002), which peaked at No. 2; likewise, their fifth studio album Alibis & Other Lies (2007) also reached No. 2. The 2004 fourth album, Thrills, Kills & Sunday Pills, peaked at No. 4. At the ARIA Music Awards of 2005 it won the Best Rock Album Award.

The band were signed to Universal Records in the United States by late 1998, and were promoted with the songs "Champion", which featured in Gran Turismo 3; "Post Enebriated Anxiety", which was on the international version of Guide to Better Living (1999); "Chemical Heart", via the internet; and a cover of the Prong song "Snap Your Fingers, Snap Your Neck", from Grinspoon's Pushing Buttons (1998) EP, which was also included on ECW: Extreme Music (1998). On 4 December 2013, the band members announced an indefinite hiatus to pursue individual projects, although they made a return in earnest in 2017. Their eighth studio album, Whatever, Whatever (2024) reached No. 3.

== History ==
=== 1995-2000: Early years ===
In July 1995, Pat Davern (guitar), Joe Hansen (bass guitar), Kristian Hopes (drums) and Phil Jamieson (vocals, guitar) met at a Lismore hotel, The Gollan, for a jam night. They decided to form a band and three weeks later they recorded a two-track demo, which they entered for the national youth radio station Triple J's Unearthed competition. Their name was taken from Lester Grinspoon, an associate professor emeritus of psychiatry at Harvard Medical School, who supported marijuana for medical use. They won the competition with their post-grunge, alternative rock song "Sickfest" – their first track ever written together by Davern and Jamieson.

Grinspoon gained airplay on Triple J and independent radio stations. They developed a strong following among the Australian "alternative" and "mosh pit crowd." Their debut extended Play (EP) was the six-track, Grinspoon (a.k.a. Green Album), was released in 1995 through the independent Oracle Records. It contained the songs "Sickfest" and "More Than You Are" that became popular with fans and were rerecorded on later releases.

Grinspoon's second EP, Licker Bottle Cozy, recorded in June 1996 and produced by Phil McKellar, was released by Grudge Records in December. It had a slightly heavier sound than their earlier EP with five tracks including the songs "Champion" and "Pig Pen". In September 1997 they released their first full-length album, Guide to Better Living, co-produced by McKellar and well-known Swiss-American heavy metal producer Ulrich Wild. The album peaked at No. 11 on the ARIA Albums Charts and went platinum with sales of over 70,000 in Australia. It represents the Helmet-influenced alternative metal sound of their early career with heavier songs like "Pressure Tested 1984". The Australian version of the album features five live songs—illustrating the band's sense of humour and ability to play live—and a hidden track, the acoustic "Protest". US branch of Universal Records signed the band by late 1998 and released an altered version of Guide to Better Living in March 1999.

Whilst in US touring for ten months as support act for Creed, Lit, Godsmack and Anthrax, Grinspoon released a six track EP, Pushing Buttons, for their Australian market in September 1998. It featured the popular heavy song "Black Friday" and the lighter songs "Busy" and "Explain". After the intense US touring, Grinspoon released their second album, Easy in September 1999, which peaked at No. 4 and went platinum in Australia. It contained the singles "Ready 1" and "Rock Show".

=== 2001-2007: Changing direction ===
After a break to reconsider their direction and sound Grinspoon started recording their next album, New Detention, in Sydney's Festival Studios in September 2001 but prior to finishing the studios were shut down and so vocals and guitars were recorded in smaller studios. Further delays occurred after Hopes injured his hand on a studio window. New Detention was released in June 2002 and was more commercial—it peaked at No. 2 on the ARIA Albums Charts and went platinum. The first single from the album, "Chemical Heart", released in February had created a stir with long term fans and the media because it was different from their previous grunge sound. The band insisted the change was a natural one and was an improvement. Nevertheless, the band still performs older tracks in their live shows. They released a four track EP in March 2003, Panic Attack—containing a cover of INXS's "Don't Change"—which reached No. 13 on the ARIA Singles Chart.

In August 2004, they released a new single, "Hard Act To Follow", which reached the Top 30. It was from the September album Thrills, Kills & Sunday Pills, which peaked at No. 4 and went platinum. Grinspoon also performed at the 2004 NRL grand final before a second single, "Better Off Alone", issued in November, also reached the Top 30. The third single was "Hold on Me" released in February 2005. For Thrills, Kills & Sunday Pills, the band agreed that they were deliberately seeking a new audience, claiming they wrote a number of songs for the release and rejected any that sounded like earlier work. It won the 2005 'Best Rock Album Award' at the ARIA Music Awards. They had previously been nominated 9 times.

Grinspoon had built a strong local following after their rise, they were regulars at Australian music festivals. On 26 March 2006, Grinspoon performed "Hard Act To Follow" and "Better Off Alone" at the 2006 Commonwealth Games Closing Ceremony in Melbourne. They headlined the inaugural "Thank God It's Over" in Melbourne, at "BOBFest '06" in South Australia in October and at Odyssey 2006 at Dreamworld for New Year's Eve.

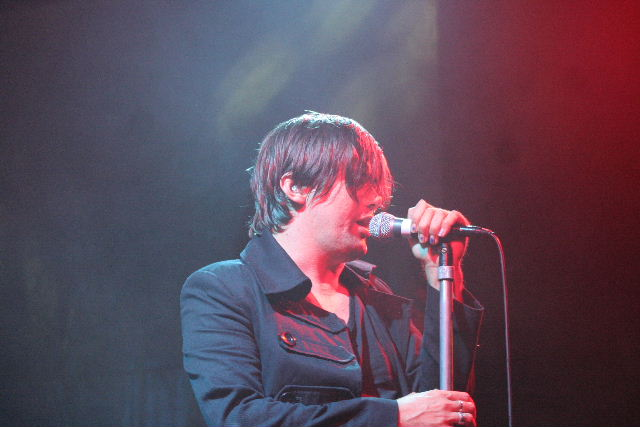
Phil Jamieson on stage, 31 December 2007

In February 2007, Jamieson admitted himself to rehab due to addiction to crystal methamphetamine. On Andrew Denton's Enough Rope in July, Jamieson discussed his drug addictions, an extramarital affair, stealing money from bandmates, detox and rehab experiences.

The band completed, Alibis & Other Lies in July 2007, as their final album for Universal. It was co-produced by the band and Ramesh Sathiah, who had worked with them on their earliest recordings. Earlier albums before this were pop-oriented rock, while Easy and Alibis & Other Lies were more heavy rock. The first single from the album, "Black Tattoo", was released as a digital download on 23 June and physically a week later. The album peaked at No. 2, their equal highest album chart position (with New Detention in 2002). Grinspoon released a 2-disc compilation entitled Best in Show. The first disc featured their hits and several older songs, like "Champion", which landed the song on Gran Turismo 3. The second disc includes a collection of covers recorded over the years. In the US, all Grinspoon albums had been released on iTunes and other online music stores. The first four were Guide To Better Living, Best In Show, Thrills, Kills, and Sunday Pills, and New Detention. Easy and Alibis & Other Lies followed on 31 October 2007.

=== 2008-2009: Hiatus ===
On 5 February 2008, Jamieson announced, via the band's official website, that Grinspoon were on hiatus following their appearance at Big Day Out in late January. Grinspoon headlined the Newton's Playground festival, held atop Bathurst's famous Mount Panorama in March, with their song "Lost Control" played in advertisements for the festival. On 1 May, Grinspoon announced they would complete more shows before writing a new album.

Grinspoon recorded The Easybeats' track "St. Louis" for a tribute album, Easy Fever: A Tribute to The Easybeats and Stevie Wright—released in October 2008—while Jamieson's duet with The Wrights on "Evie part 3: I'm Losing You" from 2005 was included. The band contributed the track "Blind Lead Blind", their B side of 2007's "Minute By Minute", to a compilation CD for The Buttery Drug and Alcohol Rehab Centre titled Caution: Life Ahead, which included contributions from other Australian acts such as Powderfinger, Midnight Oil and The Living End, and was released in November.

Grinspoon performed on 26 July 2009 at the annual Splendour in the Grass Festival in Byron Bay. Jamieson then toured with a supergroup composed of The Living End's Chris Cheney, You Am I's Tim Rogers, and Josh Pyke with a 17-piece band in August 2009. The group performed a tribute to The Beatles' White Album for its 40th anniversary.

=== 2010: Six to Midnight ===
Grinspoon's next album, titled Six to Midnight, was released on 11 September 2009 on the band's imprint Chk Chk Boom Records, distributed by Universal Records, which peaked at No. 6. Two tracks, "Dogs" and the first single, "Comeback", were released to radio earlier. For promotion of the album, the band toured in a more intimate setting than most of their previous concerts. On 6 November, Grinspoon played live on Triple J radio and confirmed that "Summer" was the second single from the album. In 2010 Premonitions was released as the third single from the album. The band toured for the album including two acoustic shows in London in early 2012 featuring Phil and Pat.

=== 2011–2019: Black Rabbits and hiatus ===
In September 2011 Grinspoon announced on their website that they are writing and recording their seventh studio album.

In May 2012 the band announced that they were heading to the United States for a month to record the album. The band also hinted that the title of the album would be Black Rabbits. The album was later slated to feature guest musicians including Chris Cheney of The Living End, Tim Rogers of You Am I and Scott Russo of Unwritten Law.

On 23 July 2012, Grinspoon released the artwork of the album on their official Facebook page, confirming the name of the release Black Rabbits.

The album was released on 28 September, debuting at number 8 on the ARIA charts.

On 5 December 2013 a statement on the official Grinspoon website announced that the band would be going on hiatus. A section of the statement reads: "Thanks to all our families, friends, and especially our fans for the support over the last 18 years – it's been a wild ride to say the least. We are still a band of brothers but it's time for us to take a break and recharge the batteries. We're excited to see what our future holds…adios amigos, it's been a blast!"

In August 2015, it was announced that the band would be reforming exclusively to play a run of dates opening for Cold Chisel.

In 2017, the band announced they would be re-releasing a special 20th Anniversary edition of Guide To Better Living and announced an Australia wide tour. The tour was sold out.

In 2019, the group released the compilation, Chemical Hearts.

=== 2020–present: Whatever, Whatever ===
In May 2024, the group released the single "Unknown Pretenders", which was written in February 2020. At the same time, they announced the release of their eighth studio album Whatever, Whatever.

== Discography ==
- Guide to Better Living (1997)
- Easy (1999)
- New Detention (2002)
- Thrills, Kills & Sunday Pills (2004)
- Alibis & Other Lies (2007)
- Six to Midnight (2009)
- Black Rabbits (2012)
- Whatever, Whatever (2024)

== Awards and nominations ==
=== APRA Awards ===
The APRA Awards are presented annually from 1982 by the Australasian Performing Right Association (APRA), "honouring composers and songwriters". They commenced in 1982.

Year	Nominee / work	Award	Result	Ref.
2013	"Passerby" (Patrick Davern and Phil Jamieson)	Song of the Year	Shortlisted	

=== ARIA Awards ===
The ARIA Music Awards are a set of annual ceremonies presented by Australian Recording Industry Association (ARIA), which recognise excellence, innovation, and achievement across all genres of the music of Australia. They commenced in 1987. Grinspoon has won 2 awards from 14 nominations.

Year	Nominee / work	Award	Result
1998	Guide to Better Living	Breakthrough Artist - Album	Nominated
2000	Jonathon Burnside – Easy	Engineer of the Year	Won
2000	Easy	Best Rock Album	Nominated
2002	New Detention	Best Rock Album	Nominated
2002	New Detention	Best Group	Nominated
2002	"Chemical Heart"	Single of the Year	Nominated
2002	Phil McKellar – New Detention	Producer of the Year	Nominated
2002	Phil McKellar – "Chemical Heart"	Engineer of the Year	Nominated
2003	Grinspoon – "No Reason"	Best Group	Nominated
2004	23 Hours of Waiting Around	Best Music DVD	Nominated
2005	Thrills, Kills & Sunday Pills	Best Group	Nominated
2005	Thrills, Kills & Sunday Pills	Best Rock Album	Won
2007	Alibis & Other Lies	Best Rock Album	Nominated
2010	Six To Midnight	Engineer of the Year	Nominated
2024	Whatever, Whatever	Best Rock Album	Nominated

=== J Awards ===
The J Awards are an annual series of Australian music awards that were established by the Australian Broadcasting Corporation's youth-focused radio station Triple J. They commenced in 2005.

Year	Nominee / work	Award	Result
2007	Alibis & Other Lies	Australian Album of the Year	Nominated
