= Phil Jamieson =

Australian musician (born 1977)

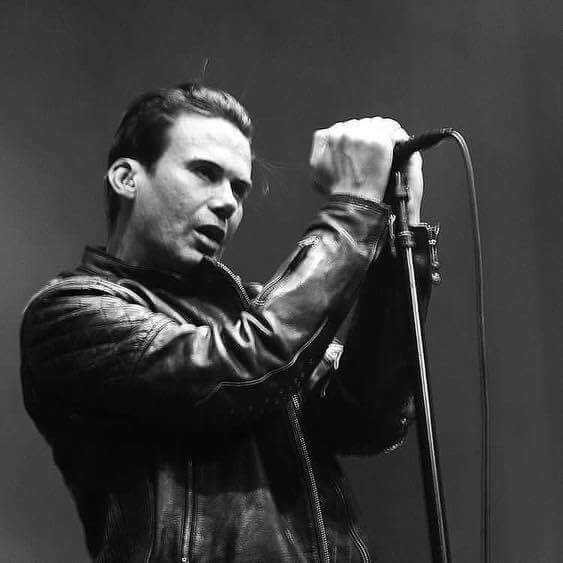
- Jamieson performing in 2017

Background information
- Also known as: 2ManyPJs
- Born: Philip William H Jamieson; 18 April 1977 (age 49); Hornsby, New South Wales, Australia
- Genre: Rock
- Occupations: Musician, songwriter
- Instruments: Vocals, guitar
- Years active: 1995–present

Philip William H Jamieson (born 18 April 1977) is an Australian musician from Hornsby, New South Wales. He is a founding member and singer-guitarist for the rock band Grinspoon.

== Early life and education ==
Philip William H Jamieson was born on 18 April 1977 in Hornsby, New South Wales, while his parents were on the road. His father was the singer of a Christian rock 'n' roll band, Good Grief, while his mother was a keyboard player in the support act. The pair toured beach missions on a Baptist church initiative. In 1983 they moved to Bourke to the Christian community Cornerstone. Jamieson has three sisters.

In the late 1980s, Jamieson became "quite obsessed" with pop music and the top ten hits on the charts. He admits to being a big fan of Bros and says the band's When Will I Be Famous? tour was the first concert he ever attended. Jamieson was also a fan of musicians such as Bon Jovi, Michael Bolton, Richard Marx, George Michael and "just anything that was particularly bad".

Jamieson attended Wauchope High School, where he co-acted the lead in the school's 1994 production of Joseph and the Amazing Technicolor Dreamcoat, sharing the role with Matthew William Joyce. During his school years, Jamieson started a band, titled Dancing with Daisies in a Meadow of Corruption, which won the Hastings Battle of the Bands competition. Jamieson was also the guitarist in Mescaline, singer in Crabapple and drummed in a punk band, Stiffy.

== Music career ==
Jamieson is best known as the front man of alternative rock band Grinspoon. In July 1995, Jamieson, on lead vocals and guitar, formed the group with Pat Davern on lead guitar, Joe Hansen on bass guitar, and Kristian Hopes on drums. Their debut gig was at a Lismore hotel, The Gollan. Greg Lawrence of WHAMMO website described Lismore's late 1980s music scene as a "collection of manic and unpredictable bands that played the – even more – unpredictable venues at the time". He opined that it was no surprise that Grinspoon were "a young troop of riff-masters balancing on the thin line between hard and punk rock". He praised the "strengths of the band" including Jamieson's "casual charisma".

In 1995, the group won the inaugural Unearthed talent contest by national youth radio network, Triple J. Their winning track became the band's first single, "Sickfest", which also appeared on their six-track self-titled extended play that year. The single was co-written by Jamieson with Davern – their first effort at song writing together. Their debut album, Guide to Better Living, was issued in September 1997 with its 16 tracks written by Jamieson, or co-written by Jamieson and Hansen, or Jamieson and Davern. It peaked at No. 11 on the ARIA Albums Chart and remained in the top 50 for 36 weeks.

The group followed with six more studio albums, Easy (September 1999), New Detention (June 2002), Thrills, Kills & Sunday Pills (September 2004), Alibis & Other Lies (July 2007), Six to Midnight (September 2009), and Black Rabbits (September 2012). All six peaked in the top 10 with both New Detention and Alibis & Other Lies reaching No. 2. Their highest point on the related ARIA Singles Chart was actually achieved by two of their extended plays, Pushing Buttons (September 1998) and Panic Attack (March 2003) – each peaked at No. 13.

In 2005 Jamieson won Best Male Performer in the second annual Jack Awards, while Grinspoon won their first ARIA Award for Best Rock Album for Thrills, Kills & Sunday Pills. Grinspoon remained together for over 18-years and from December 2013 they have been in an indefinite hiatus. In total the band had received 13 ARIA Award nominations. Jamieson showcased the sounds of Grinspoon to millions of viewers in March 2006, playing live at Melbourne Cricket Ground as part of the closing ceremony of the 2006 Commonwealth Games. The band also had a track used on the Gran Turismo 3 video game.

In addition to his work with Grinspoon, Jamieson co-wrote tracks for United States group Unwritten Law including "Elva" and "Nick and Phil" on Elva (January 2002) and "She Says" and "Because of You" on Here's to the Mourning (February 2005). Late in 2004 Jamieson was the lead vocalist for "Evie" part three, "I'm Losing You", by super group, The Wrights, which performed a cover version of Stevie Wright's 1974 hit. They issued it as a single which peaked at No. 3 on the ARIA Singles Chart in March the following year. In early 2005 Jamieson performed guest vocals on the track, "Sayonara", for the film Deck Dogz.

In August 2009, Jamieson teamed with Chris Cheney (of The Living End); Josh Pyke; and Tim Rogers (of You Am I) to perform The Beatles' White Album in its entirety in celebration of that album's 40th anniversary. They were supported by an ensemble of 17 musicians. In May 2014, Jamieson and Russo performed acoustic shows in Sydney and Melbourne. In July 2014, Jamieson, Cheney, Pyke and Rogers once again performed the White Album on an Australian tour, with a 17-piece orchestra.

Jamieson also DJs under the name "2ManyPJs" and supported the Living End in 2012 during the Sydney leg of their 'Retrospective Tour'.

In March 2017 Jamieson starred as St Jimmy in the Australian premiere of the Broadway musical 'American Idiot' in Brisbane. He is due to reprise his role for the national tour of the production in 2018.

In 2022 Jamieson released his debut solo album Somebody Else.

== Personal life ==
In March 2002, Jamieson met Julie, his partner, at a Grinspoon performance in Brisbane. Julie had been a runway model and appeared in ads and TV commercials—by 2007, the couple had two children, Tom and Lyla and by January 2014, the couple had been married for seven years. As of February 2014, Jamieson resides in Wauchope, Australia, is an avid South Sydney Rabbitohs supporter and is the team's number-two ticket holder.

In February 2007, Jamieson attended the Odyssey House drug detoxification unit in Sydney, to overcome his addiction to crystal methamphetamine, also known as "ice". Jamieson claimed the information had been leaked to the media a week later by a nurse, and said that he felt "My confidence, or my confidentiality, was completely raped". In July 2007, he went public in an interview with Andrew Denton on the TV program Enough Rope, and spoke of stealing from his bandmates to fuel his drug use and becoming estranged from his wife. Jamieson continued his rehabilitation at a private clinic with the support of Julie, his family and bandmates.

Jamieson and Julie embarked on the 'Rock N Ride' tour in January 2013 for Headspace, the National Youth and Mental Health Foundation. Jamieson founded the tour with Adam Zammit, the CEO of the Big Day Out festivals. Together with 10 other Australian musician and media personalities, Jamieson completed a five-day motorbike tour from the Gold Coast Big Day Out to the Adelaide Big Day Out. The tour aimed to engage local communities and raise awareness about youth mental health issues and ice. They repeated the tour in 2014, but rode from the Gold Coast to Melbourne in error.

In 2024, Jamieson and his wife, Julie, split due to his infidelity.

== Discography ==
=== Albums ===
List of albums, with selected details
Title	Details	Peak chart positions
Title	Details	AUS
Somebody Else	Released: 29 July 2022; Label: Cheersquad Records & Tapes; Format: CD, LP, digital	51
10Charlie	Released: 14 August 2026; Label: Origin Recordings; Format: CD, LP, digital	18

== Awards and nominations ==
=== APRA Awards ===
The APRA Awards are presented annually from 1982 by the Australasian Performing Right Association (APRA).

Year	Nominee / work	Award	Result
2003	"Chemical Heart" – Patrick Davern, Phil Jamieson	Song of the Year	Nominated
2013	"Passerby" – Davern, Jamieson	Rock Work of the Year	Nominated

=== Jack Awards ===
The annual Jack Awards ran from 2004 to 2007, they were sponsored by Jack Daniel's, the US-based whiskey company. Jamieson won Best Male Performer in 2005.
