= Pat Davern =

- Instrument: Guitar

Pat Davern is an Australian musician and the guitarist for Grinspoon. His solo album Alexander the Elephant in Zanzibar was nominated for the 2016 ARIA Award for Best Children's Album.

During a hiatus for Grinspoon, Davern wrote a book, titled Alexander the Elephant in Zanzibar, which was illustrated by Martin Chatterton. The book was launched in November 2015. Davern also recorded an album version of the book. It featured appearances from Tom Williams, Pete Murray, Alex Lloyd, Megan Washington, Connie Mitchell and members of Kingswood.

== Discography ==
List of albums with selected details
Title	Details
Alexander the Elephant in Zanzibar	Released: 5 November 2015; Format: CD; Label: ABC Music/Universal Music (4736064)

== Awards and nominations ==
=== ARIA Music Awards ===
The ARIA Music Awards is an annual ceremony presented by Australian Recording Industry Association (ARIA), which recognise excellence, innovation, and achievement across all genres of the music of Australia. They commenced in 1987.

Year	Nominee / work	Award	Result	Ref.
2016	Alexander the Elephant in Zanzibar	Best Children's Album	Nominated	
