= List of Spicks and Specks episodes =

≥ The following is a list of episodes for the Australian comedy music quiz show Spicks and Specks which began airing on 2 February 2005 on the ABC. It was first hosted by Adam Hills, with Myf Warhurst and Alan Brough as team captains. Hills, Warhurst, and Brough had agreed upon a "one in, all in" plan, and grew tired of the format, so the show ended in 2011. The next year, it was announced that Spicks and Specks would be returning with a fresh set of presenters: comedian Josh Earl as the host, and musician Ella Hooper and comedian Adam Richard as the team captains. This revival was dropped during its first season due to low ratings. In 2018, a reunion special with the original hosts was so popular that it ensured the commission of more specials, and, eventually, the return of the show in its original series format.

The first eight series comprised 26–43 episodes each. Upon its 2021 relaunch, the series transitioned to ten 50-minute episodes, while series 11 reverted to fourteen 30-minute episodes. As of 20 July 2025, 348 episodes of Spicks and Specks have aired.

== Series overview ==
Series	Episodes		Originally released	
Series	Episodes		First released	Last released
1	42		2 February 2005	18 December 2005
2	42		15 February 2006	17 December 2006
3	42		14 February 2007	16 December 2007
4	43		6 February 2008	21 December 2008
5	43		4 February 2009	20 December 2009
6	37		3 February 2010	24 December 2010
7	28		4 May 2011	23 November 2011
8	26		5 February 2014	19 December 2014
Specials	5		4 November 2018	20 December 2020
9	10		18 April 2021	20 June 2021
10	10		7 August 2022	16 October 2022
11	14	8	9 June 2024	28 July 2024
11	14	6	20 October 2024	24 November 2024
12	14	6	15 June 2025	20 July 2025
12	14	8	2 November 2025	21 December 2025

== Episodes ==
=== Series 1 (2005) ===
Episode	First broadcast	Alan's team	Myf's team
1	2 February 2005	Cal Wilson & Kram	Dinah Lee & Ross Noble
2	9 February 2005	Eddie Perfect & Ross Wilson	Angie Hart & Hamish Blake
3	16 February 2005	Katie Underwood & Scott Edgar	Jim Keays & Hamish Blake
4	23 February 2005	Beccy Cole & Greedy Smith	Simon Tedeschi & Scott Edgar
5	2 March 2005	Toni Lamond & Andy Lee	Murray Cook & Terri Psiakis
6	9 March 2005	Emma Pask & Jeff Green	Barry Crocker & Cal Wilson
7	16 March 2005	Geraldine Turner & Frank Woodley	Lucky Oceans & Bill Bailey
8	23 March 2005	Terri Psiakis & David Hirschfelder	Loene Carmen & Ross Noble
9	30 March 2005	Ella Hooper & Scott Edgar	James Morrison & Colin Lane
10	6 April 2005	Brian Cadd & Scott Edgar	Slava Grigoryan & Ross Noble
11	13 April 2005	David Hobson & Rich Hall	Angry Anderson & Kitty Flanagan
12	20 April 2005	Toni Lamond & David McCormack	Brian Mannix & Hamish Blake
13	27 April 2005	Deni Hines & Pete Smith	Mick Thomas & Hamish Blake
14	4 May 2005	Beccy Cole & Earl Okin	Frankie J. Holden & Andy Lee
15	11 May 2005	Richard Clapton & Wendy Harmer	Guy Sebastian & David O'Doherty
16	18 May 2005	Diana Doherty & Paul Capsis	Renée Geyer & Colin Lane
17	25 May 2005	Alice McNamara & Rusty Berther	John Paul Young & Wendy Harmer
18	1 June 2005	Todd McKenney & Hamish Blake	Greedy Smith & Denise Scott
19	8 June 2005	Ali McGregor & Scott Brennan	Paul Mac & Greg Fleet
20	15 June 2005	Ella Hooper & Andy Lee	Jud Arthur & Frank Woodley
21	22 June 2005	Emily Taheny & Reg Mombassa	Rob Guest & Colin Lane
22	29 June 2005	Guy Noble & Cal Wilson	Chris Cheney & Dave O'Neil
23	6 July 2005	Maya Jupiter & Shane Bourne	Jimmy Barnes & Scott Edgar
24	13 July 2005	Renée Geyer & Rusty Berther	Normie Rowe & Hamish Blake
25	20 July 2005	Brooke Fraser & Adam Rozenbachs	James Morrison & Frank Woodley
26	27 July 2005	Richard Gill & Cal Wilson	Liam Finn & Greg Fleet
27	3 August 2005	Ali McGregor & Carlotta	Courtney Murphy & Hamish Blake
28	10 August 2005	Katie Melua & Scott Edgar	Marty Rhone & Frank Woodley
29	17 August 2005	Simon Tedeschi & Andy Lee	Murray Cook & Denise Scott
30	24 August 2005	Terri Psiakis & Kram	Rhonda Burchmore & Shane Bourne
31	31 August 2005	Clare Bowditch & Ross Noble	Jane Scali & Tim Ross
32	7 September 2005	Ella Hooper & Gavin Wood	Richard Frankland & Colin Lane
33	14 September 2005	Aaron Choulai & Wilbur Wilde	Venetta Fields & Ross Noble
34	21 September 2005	Jade MacRae & Jonathan Biggins	Johnny Young & Colin Lane
35	28 September 2005	Harry James Angus & Fiona O'Loughlin	Daryl Braithwaite & Dave O'Neil
36	5 October 2005	Geraldine Turner & Pete Smith	Stuart MacLeod & Dave O'Neil
37	12 October 2005	Jenny Morris & Murray Cook	Simon Tedeschi & Hamish Blake
38	19 October 2005	Debra Byrne & Andy Lee	David Hirschfelder & Frank Woodley
39	26 October 2005	Clare Bowditch & Adam Rozenbachs	Glenn Shorrock & Hamish Blake
40	2 November 2005	Russell Morris & Scott Edgar	Todd McKenney & Meshel Laurie
41	9 November 2005	Robert Forster & Dave O'Neil	Sharon O'Neill & Colin Lane
A Very Specky Christmas 2005	18 December 2005	Belinda Emmett & Hamish Blake	James Morrison & Rove McManus

=== Series 2 (2006) ===
Episode	First broadcast	Alan's team	Myf's team
1	15 February 2006	Kate DeAraugo & Adam Richard	Peter Brocklehurst & Dave O'Neil
2	22 February 2006	Kate Miller-Heidke & Hamish Blake	Tony Sheldon & Ross Noble
3	1 March 2006	Richard Gill & Eddie Perfect	Toby Allen & Fiona O'Loughlin
4	8 March 2006	Ali McGregor & Danny Bhoy	Alex Lloyd & Ross Noble
5	15 March 2006	Christine Anu & Adam Richard	Billy Field & Denise Scott
6	22 March 2006	Toni Lamond & Adam Rozenbachs	Pete Murray & Colin Lane
7	29 March 2006	Ella Hooper & Grahame Bond	Les Gock & Meshel Laurie
8	5 April 2006	Kate Ceberano & Michael Chamberlin	Murray Cook & Arj Barker
9	12 April 2006	Ella Hooper & Rich Hall	Darryl Cotton & Dave O'Neil
10	19 April 2006	Beccy Cole & Stephen K. Amos	Rosario La Spina & Denise Scott
11	26 April 2006	Chloe Dallimore & Glenn Wool	David Page & Jason Byrne
12	3 May 2006	Ali McGregor & Francis Rossi	Rick Parfitt & Meshel Laurie
13	10 May 2006	Lenka & Earl Okin	Joe Camilleri & Ross Noble
14	17 May 2006	Ngaiire & Lulu McClatchy	Tom Burlinson & Hamish Blake
15	24 May 2006	Yumi Stynes & Wilbur Wilde	Jeff Duff & Dave O'Neil
16	31 May 2006	Jon English & Fiona O'Loughlin	Jon Toogood & Frank Woodley
17	7 June 2006	Tiffany Speight & Colin Lane	Stephen Cummings & Denise Scott
18	14 June 2006	Sarah Lee Guthrie & Gary Eck	Colin Hay & Hamish Blake
19	21 June 2006	Lisa McCune & Colin Lane	Toby Martin & Meshel Laurie
20	28 June 2006	Melinda Schneider & Cal Wilson	Leo Sayer & Dave O'Neil
21	5 July 2006	Renée Geyer & Wilbur Wilde	Molly Meldrum & Mikey Robins
22	12 July 2006	Colleen Hewett & Adam Richard	Justin Burford & Frank Woodley
23	19 July 2006	Simon Tedeschi & Julia Morris	Lee Simon & Dave O'Neil
24	26 July 2006	Denise Drysdale & Steven Gates	Lior & Denise Scott
25	2 August 2006	Diana Doherty & John Chaplin-Fleming	John-Michael Howson & Hamish Blake
26	9 August 2006	Sharon Jones & Meshel Laurie	Martin Plaza & Dave O'Neil
27	16 August 2006	Angie Hart & Amanda Keller	Al Clark & Frank Woodley
28	23 August 2006	Stephanie Ashworth & Andy Lee	John Schumann & Mikey Robins
29	30 August 2006	Mary Schneider & Rusty Berther	Carl Cox & Meshel Laurie
30	6 September 2006	Kirsty McCahon & Hamish Blake	Suffa & Frank Woodley
31	13 September 2006	Debra Byrne & Jesse Griffin	Andy Anderson & Dave O'Neil
32	20 September 2006	Martha Wainwright & Ross Noble	Rob Mills & Hamish Blake
33	27 September 2006	Patience Hodgson & Jonathan Biggins	Val Jellay & Frank Woodley
34	4 October 2006	Antoinette Halloran & Denise Scott	Stephen Mallinder & Anthony Morgan
35	11 October 2006	Ella Hooper & Akmal Saleh	Robin Lumley & Hamish Blake
36	18 October 2006	Rebecca Barnard & Tim Minchin	Mike Brady & Frank Woodley
37	25 October 2006	Grace Knight & Adam Rozenbachs	Dan Kelly & Fiona O'Loughlin
38	1 November 2006	Ian Turpie & Cal Wilson	Dave Graney & Dave O'Neil
39	8 November 2006	Kate Neal & Scott Edgar	Harry James Angus & Denise Scott
40	15 November 2006	Ali McGregor & HG Nelson	Katie Noonan & Hamish Blake
Best of 2006	22 November 2006	Compilation episode – A selection of the best scenes from 2006	
Another Very Specky Christmas	17 December 2006	Debra Byrne & Frank Woodley	Dame Edna Everage & Ross Noble

=== Series 3 (2007) ===
Episode	First broadcast	Alan's team	Myf's team
1	14 February 2007	Nancye Hayes & Jonathan Biggins	Dann Hume & Dave O'Neil
2	21 February 2007	Sarah Blasko & Frank Woodley	Brian Ritchie & Hamish Blake
3	28 February 2007	Damien Leith & Andrew McClelland	Fernando Saunders & Meshel Laurie
4	7 March 2007	Lisa Kekaula & Terri Psiakis	Guy Noble & Hamish Blake
5	14 March 2007	Ari Up & Peter Helliar	"Weird Al" Yankovic & Dave O'Neil
6	21 March 2007	Genevieve Lemon & Josh Lawson	Gerry Beckley & Frank Woodley
7	28 March 2007	Rhonda Burchmore & Adam Rozenbachs	Jeff Lang & Dave O'Neil
8	4 April 2007	Taasha Coates & Danny Bhoy	Stuart Maunder & Frank Woodley
9	11 April 2007	Darren Hayes & Tim Minchin	Jonathon Welch & Meshel Laurie
10	18 April 2007	Holly Throsby & Mark Watson	Richard Gill & Jason Byrne
11	25 April 2007	Vika Bull & David O'Doherty	Anthony Callea & Stephen K. Amos
12	2 May 2007	David Hobson & Cal Wilson	Carl Cox & Colin Lane
13 (Mother's Day Special)	9 May 2007	Rebecca Barnard & George McEncroe	Julie Anthony & Denise Scott
14	16 May 2007	Juanita Stein & Anh Do	Gina Jeffreys & Frank Woodley
15	23 May 2007	Niki Vasilakis & Dave O'Neil	Brian Mannix & Denise Scott
16 (100th Episode Special)	30 May 2007	Antoinette Halloran & Hamish Blake	Wilbur Wilde & Amanda Keller
17	6 June 2007	Katy Steele & Shane Jacobson	John Reid & Mikey Robins
18	13 June 2007	Casey Bennetto & Andy Lee	Max Merritt & Julia Morris
19	20 June 2007	Richard Gill & George McEncroe	Laurie Cadevida & Jonathan Coleman
20	27 June 2007	Lyndsay Hammond & Adam Richard	Dave Williams & Hamish Blake
21	4 July 2007	Lin Buckfield & Adam Rozenbachs	Mike Chapman & Peter Helliar
22	11 July 2007	Suzanne Dowling & Scott Edgar	Gotye & Denise Scott
23 (ARIA Hall Of Fame Special)	18 July 2007	Frank Ifield & Cal Wilson	Brian Cadd & Mikey Robins
24	25 July 2007	Ali McGregor & Shane Jacobson	Richard Gottehrer & Russell Howard
25	1 August 2007	Lara Goodridge & Wilbur Wilde	Brian Canham & Hamish Blake
26	8 August 2007	Ella Hooper & Brendon Burns	Jamie Redfern & Fiona O'Loughlin
27	15 August 2007	Tal Wilkenfeld & Justin Hamilton	Geoff Cox & Meshel Laurie
28	22 August 2007	Margret RoadKnight & Hamish Blake	Josh Pyke & Casey Bennetto
29 (Music from the Movies special)	29 August 2007	Emily Browning & Shane Jacobson	Bill Hunter & Dave O'Neil
30	5 September 2007	Antoinette Halloran & Matthew Hardy	Glenn Tilbrook & Denise Scott
31	12 September 2007	Claire Edwardes & Stephen K. Amos	Keith Potger & Frank Woodley
32	19 September 2007	Ali McGregor & Hamish Blake	Paul Grabowsky & Denise Scott
33 (Children's Music Special)	26 September 2007	Charli Robinson & Jay Laga'aia	Justine Clarke & Murray Cook
34	2 October 2007	Emily Browning & Sammy J	Lloyd Cole & Dave O'Neil
35	10 October 2007	Katie Noonan & Gary Adams	Brian Mannix & Andrew Denton
36	17 October 2007	Diana Doherty & Corinne Grant	James Lynch & Frank Woodley
37	24 October 2007	Anne Kirkpatrick & Hamish Blake	Ohad Rein & Fiona O'Loughlin
38 (Halloween Special)	31 October 2007	Deborah Conway & Adam Rozenbachs	Guy Noble & Dave Hughes
39	7 November 2007	Elenoa Rokobaro & Dave O'Neil	Ignatius Jones & Anthony Morgan
40	14 November 2007	Emma Jane Murphy & Santo Cilauro	James Reyne & Hamish Blake
Best of 2007	21 November 2007	Compilation episode – A selection of the best scenes from 2007	
A Very Specky Christmas 2007	16 December 2007	Missy Higgins & Hamish Blake	Rhonda Burchmore & Andrew Denton

=== Series 4 (2008) ===
Episode	First broadcast	Alan's team	Myf's team
1	6 February 2008	Guy Sebastian & Cal Wilson	Guy Pratt & Dave O'Neil
2	13 February 2008	Jade MacRae & Hamish Blake	David McAllister & Denise Scott
3	20 February 2008	Caroline O'Connor & Frank Woodley	Julien Temple & Dave O'Neil
4	27 February 2008	Richard O'Brien & Meshel Laurie	Richard Gill & David O'Doherty
5	5 March 2008	Sally Seltmann & Colin Lane	Jacki Weaver & Peter Helliar
6	12 March 2008	Ali Campbell & Felicity Ward	Barry McGuire & Dave O'Neil
7	19 March 2008	Eddi Reader & Adam Rozenbachs	Idan Raichel & Ross Noble
8	26 March 2008	Matthew Murphy & Ryan Shelton	Steve Lukather & Meshel Laurie
9	2 April 2008	Mark Seymour & Fiona O'Loughlin	Newton Faulkner & Jason Byrne
10	9 April 2008	Brian McFadden & Stephen K. Amos	Casey Bennetto & Meshel Laurie
11	16 April 2008	Nicolette Fraillon & Hamish Blake	Mike McLeish & Peter Rowsthorn
12	23 April 2008	Clare Bowditch & Frank Woodley	Stephen Schwartz & Fiona O'Loughlin
13	30 April 2008	Rachael Beck & Hamish Blake	Kurt Elling & Meshel Laurie
14	7 May 2008	Lorna Luft & Jonathan Biggins	Wilbur Wilde & Felicity Ward
15	14 May 2008	Lisa Miller & Greedy Smith	Dylan Lewis & Judith Lucy
16	21 May 2008	Marina Prior & Dave Hughes	Denise Scott & John Amis
17	28 May 2008	Amanda Pelman & Ryan Shelton	James Ash & Mikey Robins
18	4 June 2008	Clare Moore & Shane Jacobson	Ray Burgess & Meshel Laurie
19	11 June 2008	Dan Sultan & Denise Scott	Geoffrey Rush & Hamish Blake
20	18 June 2008	Natalie Pa'apa'a & Dave O'Neil	Damien Leith & Cal Wilson
21	25 June 2008	Taryn Fiebig & Tommy Dean	Mike Rudd & Hamish Blake
22	2 July 2008	Sipokazi Luzipo & Adam Rozenbachs	Kaz James & Shaun Micallef
23	9 July 2008	Tom Zutat & Jason Byrne	Brian McFadden & Felicity Ward
24	16 July 2008	Nell Campbell & Frank Woodley	Muscles & Hamish Blake
25	23 July 2008	Vanessa Amorosi & Mark Watson	Steve Weltman & Amanda Keller
26 (Australia vs. NZ Special)	30 July 2008	Jenny Morris & Tony Martin	Pete Murray & Meshel Laurie
27	6 August 2008	Ali McGregor & Peter Helliar	Carl Cox & Denise Scott
28	13 August 2008	Faustina "Fuzzy" Agolley & Hamish Blake	Kim Salmon & Dave O'Neil
29	20 August 2008	Kate Ceberano & Maeve Higgins	Paul Dyer & Reginald D. Hunter
30	27 August 2008	Nell Campbell & Ross Noble	Troy Cassar-Daley & Felicity Ward
31	3 September 2008	Ali McGregor & Sammy J	John O'Connell & Hamish Blake
32	10 September 2008	Brett Weymark & Al Pitcher	Jae Laffer & Denise Scott
33	17 September 2008	Judy Stone & Arj Barker	Rob Mills & Reginald D. Hunter
34	24 September 2008	Antoinette Halloran & Hamish Blake	Ron Sexsmith & Dave O'Neil
35	1 October 2008	Rhonda Burchmore & Mark Watson	John Butler & Kristen Schaal
36	8 October 2008	Behind the scenes special hosted by Hamish Blake	
37	15 October 2008	Kate Miller-Heidke & Frankie J. Holden	Anne McCue & Amanda Keller
38	22 October 2008	Kaki King & Adam Rozenbachs	Richard Gill & Dave O'Neil
39	29 October 2008	Mia Dyson & Heath Franklin	Ian "Dicko" Dickson & Des Bishop
40	5 November 2008	Leo Sayer & Eddie Perfect	William Barton & Denise Scott
41	12 November 2008	Christine Anu & Hamish Blake	Geoffrey Rush & Felicity Ward
Best of 2008	19 November 2008	Compilation episode – A selection of the best scenes from 2008	
A Very Specky Christmas 2008	21 December 2008	Ella Hooper & Frank Woodley	Carl Cox & Meshel Laurie

=== Series 5 (2009) ===
Episode	First broadcast	Alan's team	Myf's team
1	4 February 2009	Rebecca Barnard & Dave O'Neil	Guy Pearce & Felicity Ward
2	11 February 2009	Antoinette Halloran & Heath Franklin	Bruce Woodley & Meshel Laurie
3	18 February 2009	Georgie Parker & Hamish Blake	Allan Zavod & Stephen Curry
4	25 February 2009	Sharon Jones & Tommy Dean	David Bridie & Amanda Keller
5	4 March 2009	John Wood & Denise Scott	Max Sharam & Danny Bhoy
6	11 March 2009	Renée Geyer & Jesse Griffin	Chris Cheney & Meshel Laurie
7	18 March 2009	Kim Walker & Celia Pacquola	Pete Murray & Rhys Darby
8	25 March 2009	Tina Arena & Tim Minchin	Bob Evans & Dave Hughes
9	1 April 2009	Katarina Kroslakova & Adam Rozenbachs	Luka Bloom & Peter Helliar
10	8 April 2009	Guy Garvey & John Moloney	Seasick Steve & Nina Conti
11	15 April 2009	Jade MacRae & Steve Coogan	Suggs & Stephen K. Amos
12	22 April 2009	Pete Smith & Gina Riley	Kram & Rusty Berther
13	29 April 2009	Taryn Fiebig & Dave Hughes	Guy Pratt & Meshel Laurie
14	6 May 2009	Kate Miller-Heidke & Mike Keat	Bart Willoughby & Hamish Blake
15	13 May 2009	Katarina Kroslakova & Scott Edgar	Speech & Judith Lucy
16	20 May 2009	Silvie Paladino & Shane Jacobson	Chris Bailey & Dave O'Neil
17	27 May 2009	Sophie Koh & Mark Trevorrow	Ross Wilson & Cal Wilson
18	3 June 2009	Kaki King & Frank Woodley	Michael Smallwood & Amanda Keller
19 (1950's Special)	10 June 2009	Toni Lamond & Pete Smith	Frankie J. Holden & Hamish Blake
20	17 June 2009	Shelley Harland & Mike Wilmot	Iain Hewitson & Janeane Garofalo
21	24 June 2009	Brett Kelly & Denise Scott	Paris Wells & Dave Hughes
22	1 July 2009	Antoinette Halloran & Trevor Marmalade	David Campbell & Meshel Laurie
23	8 July 2009	Jim Keays & Geraldine Quinn	Wes Carr & Hamish Blake
24	15 July 2009	Ella Hooper & Adam Rozenbachs	Murray Cook & Dave O'Neil
25 (1960's Special)	22 July 2009	Denise Drysdale & Adam Richard	Brian Cadd & Ian Turpie
26	29 July 2009	Donna Simpson & Scott Edgar	Denis Walter & Colin Lane
27	5 August 2009	Jane Rutter & Rusty Berther	Matt Taylor & Denise Scott
28	12 August 2009	Natalie Bassingthwaighte & Meshel Laurie	Al Clark & Reginald D. Hunter
29	19 August 2009	Tim Finn & Jackie Loeb	Lucy Durack & Dave O'Neil
30	26 August 2009	Glenn Hughes & Sarah Millican	Jason Mraz & Jason Byrne
31	2 September 2009	Charlie Thorpe & Dave Hughes	Paul Gray & George McEncroe
32 (200th Episode Special)	9 September 2009	Ella Hooper & Hamish Blake	Paul Grabowsky & Meshel Laurie
33	16 September 2009	Peter Combe & Celia Pacquola	Tony Mott & Stephen K. Amos
34	23 September 2009	Nick Seymour & Eddie Perfect	John Swan & Denise Scott
35 (1970's Special)	30 September 2009	Molly Meldrum & Noeline Brown	Michael Gudinski & Tommy Dean
36	7 October 2009	Sophia Brous & Rusty Berther	Robert McComb & Dave O'Neil
37	14 October 2009	Suze DeMarchi & Russell Kane	Chip Monck & Rich Hall
38	21 October 2009	Megan Washington & Adam Rozenbachs	Jon Farriss & Scott Edgar
39	28 October 2009	C. W. Stoneking & Hamish Blake	Jordie Lane & Denise Scott
40 (1980's Special)	4 November 2009	Ally Fowler & Dave O'Neil	Brian Mannix & George McEncroe
Best of 2009	11 November 2009	Compilation episode – A selection of the best scenes from 2009	
Deleted Scenes 2009	18 November 2009	Compilation episode – A selection of deleted scenes from 2009, hosted Brough and Warhurst	
A Very Specky Christmas 2009	20 December 2009	Jarvis Cocker & Dave O'Neil	Peter Garrett & Denise Drysdale

=== Series 6 (2010) ===
Episode	First broadcast	Alan's team	Myf's team
1	3 February 2010	Sarah Blasko & Hamish Blake	Dave Faulkner & Cal Wilson
2	10 February 2010	Mihirangi & Denise Scott	Richard Gill & Kitty Flanagan
3	17 February 2010	Missy Higgins & Magda Szubanski	Dan Sultan & Ernie Dingo
4	24 February 2010	Florence Welch & Dave Callan	Scott Carne & Meshel Laurie
5	3 March 2010	Neko Case & Rusty Berther	Carl Cox & Dave O'Neil
6	10 March 2010	Antoinette Halloran & Jason Cook	J. Mascis & Colin Lane
7	17 March 2010	Patti Newton & Eddie Ifft	Chris Durling & Fiona O'Loughlin
8	24 March 2010	Colette Mann & Cal Wilson	Paul Dempsey & Tony Martin
9	31 March 2010	Mama Kin & Tommy Dean	Ian Moss & Denise Scott
10	7 April 2010	Amanda Palmer & Scott Edgar	Joe Chindamo & Phil Nichol
11	14 April 2010	Lara Mulcahy & Rich Fulcher	Doc Neeson & Meshel Laurie
12	21 April 2010	Darlene Love & Steve Hughes	Darren Cordeux & Reginald D. Hunter
13	28 April 2010	Amandah Wilkinson & Hamish Blake	Mark Holden & Felicity Ward
14	5 May 2010	Adalita & Jimeoin	Meat Loaf & Magda Szubanski
15	12 May 2010	Sarah McLeod & Frank Woodley	Matisyahu & Tony Martin
16 (Britannia Special)	19 May 2010	Ritchie Yorke & Hamish Blake	Jamie Cullum & Sarah Millican
17	26 May 2010	Bob Brozman & Denise Scott	Beth Nielsen Chapman & Craig Hill
18	2 June 2010	Mary Gauthier & Tommy Dean	John Foreman & Kitty Flanagan
19	9 June 2010	Felix Buxton & Damian Callinan	Mark Opitz & Meshel Laurie
20	16 June 2010	Lisa Lambert & Jimeoin	Amber Lawrence & Tony Martin
21	23 June 2010	Rohan Brooks & Andrew O'Neill	Christa Hughes & Hamish Blake
22 (Americana Special)	30 June 2010	Diana Trask & Denise Scott	Barbara Morrison & Tommy Dean
23	7 July 2010	Jacqueline Porter & Des Bishop	Ron Peno & Meshel Laurie
24	14 July 2010	Sam Moran & Dave O'Neil	Gemma Ray & Tom Binns
25	21 July 2010	Felicity Urquhart & Hannah Gadsby	Phil Jamieson & Ross Noble
26	28 July 2010	Megan Washington & Damian Callinan	Brian McFadden & Gina Yashere
27	4 August 2010	Henry Wagons & Celia Pacquola	Chrissy Amphlett & Denise Scott
28 (Europa Special)	11 August 2010	Richard Gill & Joe Avati	Jens Lekman & Meshel Laurie
29	18 August 2010	Ann Vriend & Jon Richardson	Steve Kilbey & Dave O'Neil
30	25 August 2010	Gil Askey & Frank Woodley	Ella Hooper & Dom Irrera
31	1 September 2010	Benjamin Northey & Denise Scott	Katrina Noorbergen & Greg Behrendt
32	8 September 2010	Casey Bennetto & Tim Vine	Kamahl & Meshel Laurie
33	15 September 2010	Little Pattie & Ross Noble	Paul Stewart & Francesca Martinez
34 (Australiana Special)	22 September 2010	Gabriella Cilmi & Dave O'Neil	Troy Cassar-Daley & Frank Woodley
Best of 2010	29 September 2010	Compilation episode – A selection of the best scenes from 2010	
Deleted Scenes 2010	5 October 2010	Compilation episode – A selection of deleted scenes from 2010	
A Very Specky Christmas 2010	24 December 2010	Sia & Jimeoin	Jimmy Barnes & Denise Scott

=== Series 7 (2011) ===
Episode	First broadcast	Alan's team	Myf's team
1 (Comedy Special)	4 May 2011	Doc Brown & Kitty Flanagan	David O'Doherty & Stephen K. Amos
2	11 May 2011	Anthony Warlow & Colin Lane	Grace Woodroofe & Hamish Blake
3	18 May 2011	Marcia Hines & Justin Heazlewood	Shaun Diviney & Peter Helliar
4	25 May 2011	Vince Jones & Scott Edgar	Matt Lee & Meshel Laurie
5	1 June 2011	Christie Whelan Browne & Tommy Dean	Brian Mannix & Dave O'Neil
6	8 June 2011	Jane Badler & Adam Richard	Ben Folds & Denise Scott
7	22 June 2011	Azmarino & Tommy Dean	Glenn Wheatley & Peter Helliar
8	29 June 2011	Finbar Furey & Scott Edgar	Shane Nicholson & Dave O'Neil
9	13 July 2011	Diesel & Judith Lucy	Chris Botti & Damian Callinan
10	20 July 2011	Geraldine Quinn & Scott Edgar	Courtney Taylor-Taylor & Peter Helliar
11	27 July 2011	Kellie Dickerson & Tommy Dean	Quan Yeomans & Cal Wilson
12	3 August 2011	Paris Wells & Jimeoin	Iain Grandage & Frank Woodley
13	10 August 2011	Sharon Millerchip & Dave O'Neil	Justin Burford & Meshel Laurie
14	17 August 2011	Marina Prior & Lawrence Mooney	Mic Conway & Denise Scott
15	24 August 2011	Antoinette Halloran & Tom Ballard	Wendy Stapleton & Damian Callinan
16	31 August 2011	Leah Flanagan & Jimeoin	John Williamson & Dave O'Neil
17	7 September 2011	Elana Stone & Dave Thornton	Iva Davies & Frank Woodley
18	14 September 2011	Richard Gill & Meshel Laurie	Ella Hooper & Hamish Blake
19	21 September 2011	Jane Clifton & Lawrence Mooney	Winston McCall & Peter Helliar
20	28 September 2011	Sharon Jones & Felicity Ward	Michael Chugg & Tommy Dean
21	5 October 2011	Pigeon John & Damian Callinan	Patrizio Buanne & Meshel Laurie
22	12 October 2011	Bernadette Robinson & Peter Helliar	Ross Wilson & Denise Scott
23	19 October 2011	Fiona Campbell & Greg Fleet	Lee Kernaghan & Rusty Berther
24	26 October 2011	Hugh Halliday & Dave O'Neil	Kram & Josh Earl
25	2 November 2011	Takesha Meshé Kizart & Scott Edgar	Red Symons & Denise Scott
26	9 November 2011	"Best of Spicks & Specks" – Two-part compilation episodes with a selection of the best scenes from 2005–2011	
27	16 November 2011	"Best of Spicks & Specks" – Two-part compilation episodes with a selection of the best scenes from 2005–2011	
28 (The Finale)	23 November 2011	Ella Hooper, Scott Edgar, Rhonda Burchmore, Adam Richard, Brian Cadd, Amanda Keller, Antoinette Halloran, Tommy Dean, Megan Washington & Peter Helliar	Geoffrey Rush, Dave O'Neil, Darren Hayes, Felicity Ward, Brian Mannix, Jimeoin, Richard Gill, Shane Bourne, Dan Sultan & Denise Scott

=== Series 8 (2014) ===
Episode	First Broadcast	Ella's Team	Adam's Team
1	5 February 2014	Jay Watson & Meshel Laurie	Jacqueline Dark & Des Bishop
2	12 February 2014	Suzi Quatro & Lewis Hobba	Helen Croome & Lawrence Mooney
3	19 February 2014	Simon Tedeschi & Tom Gleeson	Clairy Browne & Luke McGregor
4	26 February 2014	Sean Kelly & Dave O'Neil	Nadia Salemme & Urzila Carlson
5	5 March 2014	DJ Shadow & Tegan Higginbotham	Ricki-Lee Coulter & Tom Gleeson
6	12 March 2014	Joseph Tawadros & Celia Pacquola	Kate Miller-Heidke & Tony Martin
7	19 March 2014	Peter Oxley & Dave O'Neil	Ashleigh Dallas & Tom Ballard
8	26 March 2014	Dan Sultan & Genevieve Fricker	Ben Mingay & Denise Drysdale
9	2 April 2014	Damien Demsey & Jason Byrne	Antoinette Halloran & Joe Lycett
10	9 April 2014	Jake Stone & Kevin Bridges	Wilma Smith & David O'Doherty
11	16 April 2014	Richard Gill & Shaparak Khorsandi	Ade Edmondson & Felicity Ward
12	23 April 2014	Teddy Tahu Rhodes & Luke McGregor	Martha Davis & Frank Woodley
13	30 April 2014	Reece Mastin & Claire Hooper	Emma Matthews & Kyle Kinane
14	7 May 2014	Meshel Laurie & Ashley Evans	Lucy Durack & Luke McGregor
15	14 May 2014	Seth Sentry & Stephen K. Amos	Adalita & James Acaster
16	21 May 2014	John Paul Young & Dave Hughes	Jasmine Rae & Michael Winslow
17	28 May 2014	Grandmaster Flash & Lewis Hobba	Lisa McCune & Meshel Laurie
18	4 June 2014	Michael Franti & Claire Hooper	Deborah Cheetham & Tom Gleeson
19	11 June 2014	Vance Joy & Denise Scott	Lara Mulcahy & Dave O'Neil
20	18 June 2014	Brian Mannix & Claire Hooper	Kasey Chambers & Rusty Berther
21	14 November 2014	Paul Dempsey & Seán Cullen	Kerri Simpson & Tom Gleeson
22	21 November 2014	Russell Morris & Dave O'Neil	Will Pickvance & Tegan Higginbotham
23	28 November 2014	Pete Thomas & Meshel Laurie	Claire Bowditch & Milton Jones
24	5 December 2014	Nai Palm & Paul Foot	Bobby Fox & Tom Gleeson
25	12 December 2014	Bob Sedergreen & Frank Woodley	Beth Hart & Cal Wilson
26	19 December 2014	Darren Middleton & Sammy J	Kate Ceberano & Randy Feltface

=== Revival specials (2018–2020) ===
Episode	First broadcast	Alan's team	Myf's team
Reunion Special	4 November 2018	Ricki-Lee Coulter & Frank Woodley	Briggs & Denise Scott
AusMusic Special	24 November 2019	Missy Higgins & Rove McManus	Brian Mannix & Nina Oyama
90s Special	23 February 2020	Tina Arena & Tom Gleeson	Kram & Anne Edmonds
00s Special	19 April 2020	Ella Hooper & Joel Creasey	Nic Cester & Sarah Kendall
2010s Special	20 December 2020	Kate Miller-Heidke & Luke McGregor	Vance Joy & Claire Hooper

=== Series 9 (2021) ===
Episode	First Broadcast	Alan's team	Myf's Team
1	18 April 2021	G-Flip & Frank Woodley	Linda Bull & Dilruk Jayasinha
2	25 April 2021	Christie Whelan & Nath Valvo	Scott Darlow & Danielle Walker
3	2 May 2021	Amy Taylor & Denise Scott	Stephanie Kabanyana Kanyandekwe & Tom Ballard
4	9 May 2021	Alice Skye & Rhys Nicholson	Josh Teskey & Zoë Coombs Marr
5	16 May 2021	Mo'Ju & Michala Banas	Eddie Perfect & Nazeem Hussain
6	23 May 2021	Alex Lahey & Claire Hooper	Quan Yeomans & Anne Edmonds
7	30 May 2021	Kyla Matsuura-Miller & Kate McCartney	Isaiah Firebrace & Peter Helliar
8	6 June 2021	Kate Ceberano & Luke McGregor	Mitch Tambo & Kate McLennan
9	13 June 2021	Gordi & Jess Harris	Sensible J & Lloyd Langford
10	20 June 2021	Missy Higgins & Dave O'Neil	Yeo & Judith Lucy

=== Series 10 (2022) ===
Episode	First Broadcast	Alan's team	Myf's team
1	7 August 2022	Casey Donovan & Rhys Nicholson	David Novak & Bec Charlwood
2	14 August 2022	Emma Watkins & Michael Hing	Georgia Maq & Joel Creasey
3	21 August 2022	Jemma Rix & Nazeem Hussain	Tom Cardy & Danielle Walker
4	28 August 2022	Montaigne & Steph Tisdell	Zan Rowe & Luke McGregor
5	4 September 2022	Aaron Wyatt & Courtney Act	Guest team captain: Michala Banas; Vanessa Amorosi & Hamish Blake
6	18 September 2022	Kayven Temperley & Alex Lee	Odette & Dave O'Neil
7	25 September 2022	Andrea Kellar & Reuben Kaye	Briggs & Zoë Coombs Marr
8	2 October 2022	Reuben Styles & Cal Wilson	Thando & Nath Valvo
9	9 October 2022	Dylan Alcott & Gabbi Bolt	Mama Alto & Peter Helliar
10	16 October 2022	Brooke McClymont & Sam Taunton	Timomatic & Denise Scott

=== Series 11 (2024) ===
Episode	First Broadcast	Alan's team	Myf's team
1	9 June 2024	Yve Blake & Tommy Little	Anthony Callea & Steph Tisdell
2	16 June 2024	Dan Sultan & Dave O'Neil	Nina Korbe & Lou Wall
3	23 June 2024	Montaigne & Greg Larsen	Nooky & Zoë Coombs Marr
4	30 June 2024	Oli Leimbach & Bec Charlwood	Elise McCann & Dilruk Jayasinha
5	7 July 2024	Marlon Williams & Geraldine Hickey	Big Wett & Rhys Nicholson
6	14 July 2024	Ngaiire & Ross Noble	Eamon Sandwith & Meshel Laurie
7	21 July 2024	Benjamin Northey & Cameron James	Athina Uh Oh & Peter Helliar
8	28 July 2024	Fanny Lumsden & Shane Jacobson	Elly-May Barnes & Courtney Act
9	20 October 2024	Astrid Jorgensen & Zoë Coombs Marr	Anthony Albanese & Ben Lee
10	27 October 2024	Angie McMahon & Mel Tracina	Jason Arrow & Hamish Blake
11	3 November 2024	Emily Wurramara & Claire Hooper	Ella Hooper & Brett Blake
12	10 November 2024	Jude Perl & Joel Creasey	Johnny Took & Abbie Chatfield
13	17 November 2024	Behani & Tom Cardy	Brian Mannix & Michala Banas
14	24 November 2024	Gillian Cosgriff & Jenny Tian	Phil Jamieson & Tom Ballard

=== Series 12 (2025) ===
Episode	First Broadcast	Alan's team	Myf's team
1	15 June 2025	Charlie Collins & Rhys Nicholson	John Pearce & Sara Pascoe
2	22 June 2025	Natalie Bassingthwaighte & Nina Oyama	Sam Cromack & Steph Tisdell
3	29 June 2025	Marcia Hines & Dave O'Neil	Hatchie & Will Gibb
4	6 July 2025	Cyril & Bec Charlwood	Calum Hood & Chloe Petts
5	13 July 2025	Eddie Perfect & Jordan Barr	Vera Blue & Tom Ballard
6	20 July 2025	Meg Washington & Joel Creasey	Adam Hyde & Abbie Chatfield
7	2 November 2025	Ross Wilson & Urvi Majumdar	Andrea Lam & Frank Woodley
8	9 November 2025	Miss Kaninna & Tommy Little	Don West & Geraldine Hickey
9	16 November 2025	Robert Forster & Julia Morris	Ruva Ngwenya & Brett Blake
10	23 November 2025	MC Suffa & Denise Scott	Jem Cassar-Daley & Peter Helliar
11	30 November 2025	Angie Hart & Zoe Coombs Marr	Robert Baxter & Noah Szto
12	7 December 2025	DEVAURA & Colin Lane	Kram & Danielle Walker
13	14 December 2025	Lucy Durack & Greg Larsen	Royston Noell & Sara Pascoe
14	21 December 2025	Tash Sultana & Josh Thomas	Jacob Charlton & Georgie Carroll

=== Series 13 (2026) ===
Episode	First Broadcast	Alan's team	Myf's team
1	8 July 2026	Grace Cummings & Chloe Petts	Michael Pynter & Pete Helliar
2	15 July 2026	Ruel & Olga Koch	Deborah Cheetham Fraillon & Tom Ballard
3	22 July 2026	Buyi Zama & Joel Creasey	Amy Shark & Tyrone Pynor
4	29 July 2026	Caleb Harper & Nikki Britton	Dami Im & Andrew Maxwell
5	5 August 2026	Rhonda Burchmore & Brett Blake	Zion Garcia & Zoe Coombs Marr
6	12 August 2026	Kate Miller-Heidke & Noah Szto	Toshi Maeda & Denise Scott
7	19 August 2026	BARKAA & Nina Oyama	Chris Cheney & Hannah Gadsby
8	26 August 2026	Katie Noonan & John Safran	Noah Hill & Bec Charlwood
9	2 September 2026	Jaida Stephenson & Tommy Little	Watty Thompson & Felicity Ward
10	9 September 2026	Sheridan Harbridge & Jordan Barr	Lucas Harwood & Takashi Wakasugi
11	16 September 2026	Jett Blyton & Geraldine Hickey	Casey Donovan & Colin Lane
12	23 September 2026	Nic Buc & Kath Ebbs	Becca Hatch & Frank Woodley
