= Geraldine Quinn =

Australian comedian

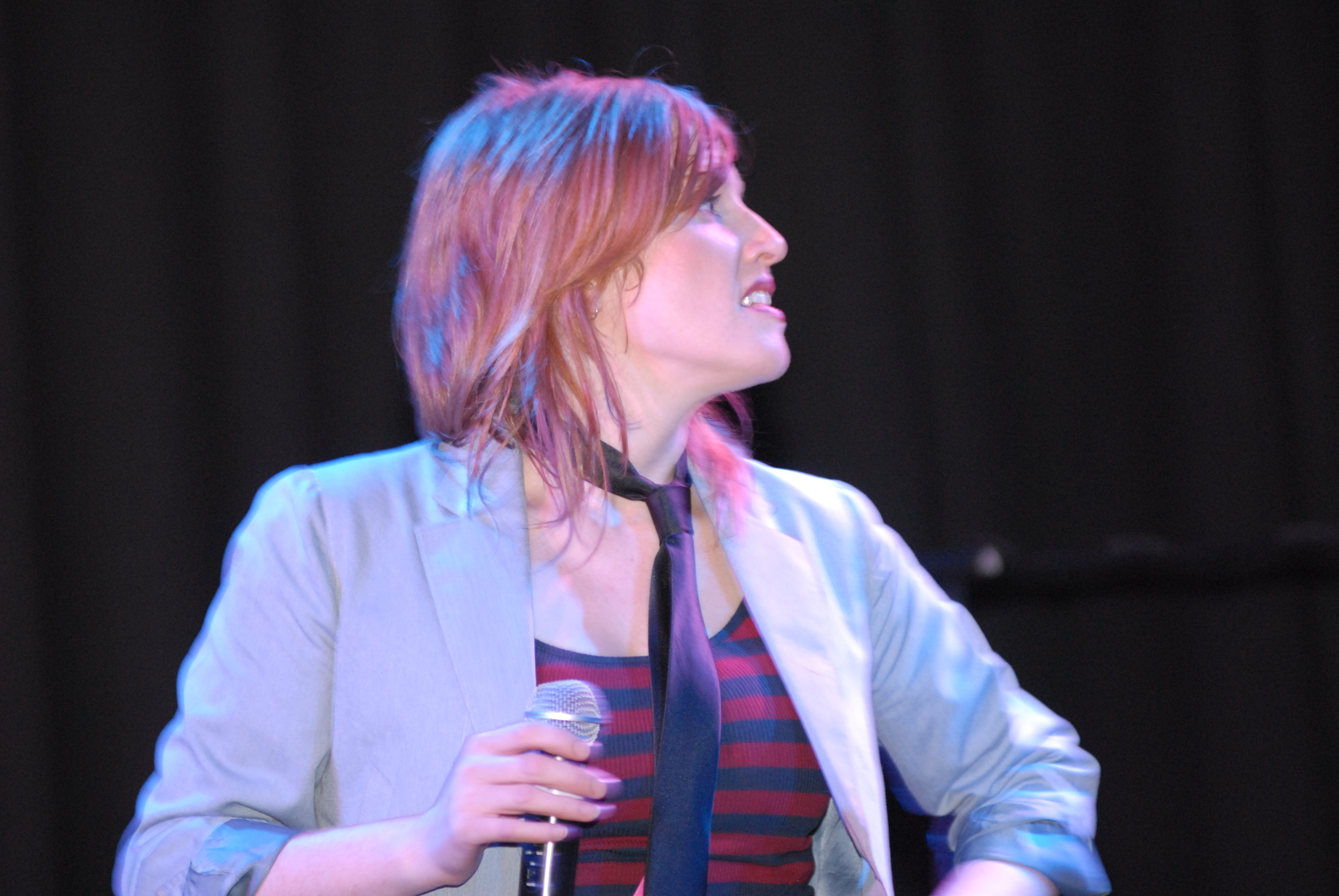
- Quinn in 2007 performing at Trades Hall, Melbourne
- Born: Geraldine Mary Quinn; Wagga Wagga, New South Wales, Australia
- Education: St John's Regional College, National Theatre Drama School
- Occupations: Songwriter; guitarist; singer; comedian; actor

Geraldine Mary Quinn is an Australian songwriter, guitarist, singer, comedian, and actor based in Melbourne. She has performed solo shows at many arts and comedy festivals, including Hex And The City in Adelaide, Melbourne, and the Edinburgh Festival Fringe (2009), and Queen Bitch at the 2018 Melbourne International Comedy Festival.

== Early life and education ==
Geraldine Mary Quinn was born in Wagga Wagga, New South Wales and moved to Melbourne with her family at a young age.

She attended St John's Regional College between 1987 and 1992. She trained as an actor at National Theatre Drama School.

== Career ==
=== Live performance ===
In 2007 Quinn performed at The Famous Spiegeltent with Paul Kelly in a celebration of his songs by leading cabaret artists including Eddie Perfect, Camille O'Sullivan, Paul Capsis, and Debra Byrne.

In 2007, 2008, and 2015, Quinn toured with the Melbourne International Comedy Festival (MICF) Roadshow.

In 2009, she performed her show Hex And The City at Adelaide Fringe and in Melbourne, where it sold out, and then at the Edinburgh Festival Fringe.

In April 2014, Quinn hosted the Upfront Gala at MICF.

In July 2015, Quinn was asked to perform at the opening of the David Bowie Is exhibition in Melbourne.

In 2018, Quinn performed her show Queen Bitch at the Malthouse Theatre for MICF. Daniel Ziffer of the Herald Sun gave it 3.5 stars out of 5, describing it as a "funfair ride of laughs and thrills" and "sharp and controlled".

In 2023, Quinn performed her original show BROAD at MICF. The show was highly successful, receiving positive reviews in Australian Stage Online,

Over the course of her career, Quinn has also performed and toured solo shows at the Sydney Big Laugh Comedy Festival, Bangalow Arts Festival, Brisbane Cabaret Festival, Melbourne Cabaret Festival, New Zealand International Comedy Festival, Fringe World in Perth, and the Adelaide Cabaret Festival.

=== Television and radio ===
Quinn has appeared on Australian TV shows Spicks and Specks, RocKwiz, Adam Hills Tonight, The Comedy Channel, Upper Middle Bogan, How To Stay Married and Get Krack!n.

She was a regular guest on ABC Radio's The Conversation Hour.

=== Music ===
Quinn has released several albums.

In 2020, Quinn performed Casey Bennetto's song I AM as an entry in "SBS's Eurovision 2020 - Australia Decides", the competition to decide Australia's entry for the Eurovision Song Contest 2020.

== Awards and nominations ==
Quinn won the Best Emerging Cabaret Artiste award at the 2006 Green Room Awards in Melbourne, and was nominated for Original Songs.

In the 2010 MICF, Quinn was nominated for the Golden Gibbo Award (Best Independent Local Production) for her solo production Shut Up and Sing. Shut Up and Sing went on to be nominated in the 2010 Victorian Green Room Awards for Best Cabaret Production, Best Cabaret Artiste and Original Songs.

Quinn is a two-time recipient of the Moosehead Award for the development of her 2011 show You're the Voice: Songs for the Ordinary by an Anthemaniac (directed by Casey Bennetto, writer of Keating!) and her 2014 show MDMA: Modern Day Maiden Aunt (directed by Justin Hamilton). You're the Voice went on to win the 2011 Melbourne International Comedy Festival's Golden Gibbo Award for Best Independent Local Production. It was the second year running Quinn had been nominated for the award. You're the Voice and the follow-up The Last Gig in Melbourne were nominated for Best Cabaret Artiste, Best Cabaret Production and won for Original Songs in the 2011 Green Room Awards.

At the 2014 New Zealand Fringe Festival, Stranger, an original show by Quinn inspired by the music of David Bowie, was nominated for Stand Out Performer and Best Music.

In 2014, Quinn was nominated for her third Green Room Award for Best Cabaret Artiste for Sunglasses at Night: The 80s Apocalypse Sing Along Cabaret. Also in 2014, MDMA: Modern Day Maiden Aunt dominated the Green Room Awards with four nominations for Best Cabaret, Best Artiste, Original Songs and Best Writing, as well as a nomination for her collaborative cabaret with Perth musician Michael de Grussa All Out of Pride: An Evening of Songs You're Ashamed to Love (Best Cabaret). Quinn took away the award for Best Cabaret Artiste (2014). MDMA was also nominated for Best Cabaret, Best Stand Up, Best Comedy and Outstanding Performer in the 2015 New Zealand Fringe Festival, winning Best Cabaret.

Quinn swept the Green Room Awards in 2024 and 2025 with her 2022 MICF Most Outstanding Show nominated and Golden Gibbo nominated show 'BROAD' and 'The Passion of Saint Nicholas'

=== Discography ===
- A Quick One (2005)
- Scream 'Jarvis Cocker' When You're Losing (2008)
- You're the Voice: Songs for the Ordinary by an Anthemaniac (2011)
- MDMA: Modern Day Maiden Aunt (2014)
- The Last Gig In Melbourne (2016)
- Fox Poncing (2017)
- BROAD / The Passion of Saint Nicholas (2025)
