= Adam Hills Tonight =

2011–2013 Australian TV series

- Also known as: Adam Hills in Gordon Street Tonight
- Presented by: Adam Hills
- Starring: Hannah Gadsby; Dave O'Neil
- Country of origin: Australia
- Original language: English
- No. of series: 3
- No. of episodes: 36

Production
- Production locations: Gordon Street, Elsternwick, Melbourne, Australia
- Running time: 60 minutes

Original release
- Network: ABC1
- Release: 9 February 2011 – 31 July 2013

Adam Hills Tonight, formerly known as Adam Hills in Gordon Street Tonight, is a comedic Australian television interview show that ran from February 2011 to July 2013 on ABC1. It was hosted by comedian Adam Hills and co-starred Hannah Gadsby and Dave O'Neil. The show featured celebrity guests, comedy, and live music.

== History and production ==
The first series went to air as Adam Hills in Gordon Street Tonight from 9 February 2011. The series was co-written by Hills, Gadsby, Michael Chamberlin, Stephen Hall, Justin Kennedy and others.

The program was filmed at ABC TV's Melbourne studios in Gordon Street, Elsternwick and involved significant audience participation based on a questionnaire that audience members filled in prior to the show, focusing on unusual traits, habits or belongings of audience members. These have included membership in "The Church of the Latter Day Geek" and "Mousey", the bedtime companion of an adult audience member. Popular audience members were invited to return; for example Mousey's adventures became an ongoing theme in the first series, culminating in a hit single about the toy released on iTunes by Hills.

The second series premiered on 8 February 2012.

The title of the show in the third series, which ran from 15 May 2013, was changed to Adam Hills Tonight, with the Gordon St set being removed from the studio. The removal of the Gordon St theme was only explained satirically during an ABC advertisement for the show, in which Adam Hills was told that the set was too high and was removed, instead of simply making it lower.

On 28 November 2013, Adam Hills announced that the show was ending as he feared "running out of funny" and that trying to combine careers in Australia and the UK at the same time was proving to be impractical.

== Episodes ==
=== Series overview ===
| Series | Episodes | Originally released | |
| Series | Episodes | First released | Last released |
|---|---|---|---|
| 1 | 12 | 9 February 2011 | 27 April 2011 |
| 2 | 12 | 8 February 2012 | 25 April 2012 |
| 3 | 12 | 15 May 2013 | 31 July 2013 |

=== Season 1 (2011) ===
| No. overall | No. in season | Title | Original release date | Guest(s) |
|---|---|---|---|---|
| 1 | 1 | "Episode 1" | 9 February 2011 | Dan Sultan, Melissa George, Arj Barker, Simon McKeon, James Reyne |
| 2 | 2 | "Episode 2" | 16 February 2011 | Megan Gale, Tim Minchin, Charles Waterstreet, Neon Trees |
| 3 | 3 | "Episode 3" | 23 February 2011 | Carl Barron, Jessica Mauboy, Lauren Jackson, Jon Toogood, Stephen K Amos |
| 4 | 4 | "Episode 4" | 2 March 2011 | Anh Do, Anna Bligh, Martha Wainwright, Steve Frost, Little Red |
| 5 | 5 | "Episode 5" | 9 March 2011 | Jason Byrne, Jeff Lindsay, Zoe Ventoura, Dave Larkin, Alexis Jordan, Dave Thornton |
| 6 | 6 | "Episode 6" | 16 March 2011 | Dave Hughes, Paul Watson, Claudia Karvan, Paris Wells, The Bedroom Philosopher, Weird Al Yankovic |
| 7 | 7 | "Episode 7" | 23 March 2011 | Nick Vujicic, Frank Woodley, Jennifer Byrne, Sparkadia, Sally Seltmann |
| 8 | 8 | "Episode 8" | 30 March 2011 | Tony Martin, Maria Bamford, Charley Boorman, Dan Kelly, Architecture in Helsinki |
| 9 | 9 | "Episode 9" | 6 April 2011 | k.d. lang, Tom Ballard, Mark Watson, Immigrant Union |
| 10 | 10 | "Episode 10" | 13 April 2011 | Asher Keddie, Greg Proops, Kerry O'Brien, Tom Gleeson, Mad Bastards Trio, Tinie Tempah |
| 11 | 11 | "Episode 11" | 20 April 2011 | Merrick Watts, The Rats of Tobruk, Samah Hadid, Ardal O'Hanlon, Geoffrey Gurrumul Yunupingu, The Secret Sisters |
| 12 | 12 | "Episode 12" | 27 April 2011 | John Doyle, Meshel Laurie, Father Bob, Soweto Gospel Choir, Oh Mercy |

=== Season 2 (2012) ===
| No. overall | No. in season | Title | Original release date | Guest(s) |
|---|---|---|---|---|
| 13 | 1 | "Episode 1" | 8 February 2012 | Essie Davis, Rob Sitch, Josh Lawson, Jonathan Lynn, Eagle and the Worm |
| 14 | 2 | "Episode 2" | 15 February 2012 | Judith Lucy, Kurt Fearnley, Lanie Lane, Paul Kelly, Adam Ant |
| 15 | 3 | "Episode 3" | 22 February 2012 | Ross Noble, Alain de Botton, Thomas Keneally, Olivia Newton-John, Boy & Bear |
| 16 | 4 | "Episode 4" | 29 February 2012 | Adam Richard, Francesca Martinez, Rachel Ward, Ryan Adams, Anabelle Kay |
| 17 | 5 | "Episode 5" | 7 March 2012 | Stephen K. Amos, Germaine Greer, Norman Cook, Pete Murray, Lenny Henry |
| 18 | 6 | "Episode 6" | 14 March 2012 | Julia Morris, Lachy Hulme, Tom Green, Skipping Girl Vinegar, John Cleese |
| 19 | 7 | "Episode 7" | 21 March 2012 | David O'Doherty, Barry Humphries, Petula Clark, Nick Lowe, Stonefield |
| 20 | 8 | "Episode 8" | 28 March 2012 | Hamish Blake, Shannon Bennett, Noni Hazlehurst, Adam Ant |
| 21 | 9 | "Episode 9" | 4 April 2012 | Jimeoin, Tim FitzHigham, Wanda Sykes, The Bamboos, Tim Rogers, Jay & Silent Bob |
| 22 | 10 | "Episode 10" | 11 April 2012 | Dave Gorman, Brian Schmidt, The Temper Trap, Virginia Gay, Michael Bolton |
| 23 | 11 | "Episode 11" | 18 April 2012 | Simon Amstell, Henry Rollins, Bindi Irwin, Kate Miller-Heidke, Rhys Darby |
| 24 | 12 | "Episode 12" | 26 April 2012 | Shaun Micallef, Missy Higgins, Yusuf Islam, Shane Howard & Friends |

=== Season 3 (2013) ===
| No. overall | No. in season | Title | Original release date | Guest(s) |
|---|---|---|---|---|
| 25 | 1 | "Episode 1" | 15 May 2013 | Tripod, Denise Scott, Father Bob Maguire, Lisa McCune |
| 26 | 2 | "Episode 2" | 22 May 2013 | Stephen K. Amos, Samour Bradley, Mandy McElhinney, Tenacious D, The Kransky Sisters |
| 27 | 3 | "Episode 3" | 29 May 2013 | Lawrence Mooney, Jack Charles, Justine Clarke, Kevin McCloud, Sammy J |
| 28 | 4 | "Episode 4" | 5 June 2013 | John Waters, Tim Rogers, Dave O'Neil, Ruby Wax, Ali McGregor |
| 29 | 5 | "Episode 5" | 12 June 2013 | Kitty Flanagan, Lawrence Krauss, Bernard Fanning, Josh Earl |
| 30 | 6 | "Episode 6" | 19 June 2013 | Paul McDermott, Ella Hooper, Bill Oddie |
| 31 | 7 | "Episode 7" | 26 June 2013; 7 August 2013 | Frank Woodley, Craig McLachlan, Lucy Durack, Geraldine Quinn |
| 32 | 8 | "Episode 8" | 3 July 2013 | Paul Hogan, Jimeoin, Les Murray, Kate Ceberano |
| 33 | 9 | "Episode 9" | 10 July 2013 | Josh Thomas, Leigh Sales, Paul Kelly, Molly Ringwald, Rusty and Another Guy |
| 34 | 10 | "Episode 10" | 17 July 2013 | Peter Helliar, Kaarla Grant, The Bedroom Philosopher, Simon Pegg, Nick Frost, Brian Cox |
| 35 | 11 | "Episode 11" | 24 July 2013 | Cal Wilson, Paul Nicklen, Max Walker, Shane Jacobson, The Umbilical Brothers |
| 36 | 12 | "Episode 12" | 31 July 2013 | Amanda Keller, Samuel Johnson, Glenn Robbins, Barry Morgan |

== See also ==
- List of Australian television series
