= Barry Morgan =

Barry Morgan may refer to:

- Bari Morgan (born 1980), Welsh footballer
- Barry Morgan (bishop) (born 1947), Welsh archbishop
- Barry Morgan (character), eponymous character in Barry Morgan's World of Organs
- Barry Morgan (musician) (1931–2007), English drummer for Blue Mink and owner of Morgan Studios
- Barry Morgan (Neighbours), fictional character on the Australian soap opera, Neighbours
