= Ann Vriend =

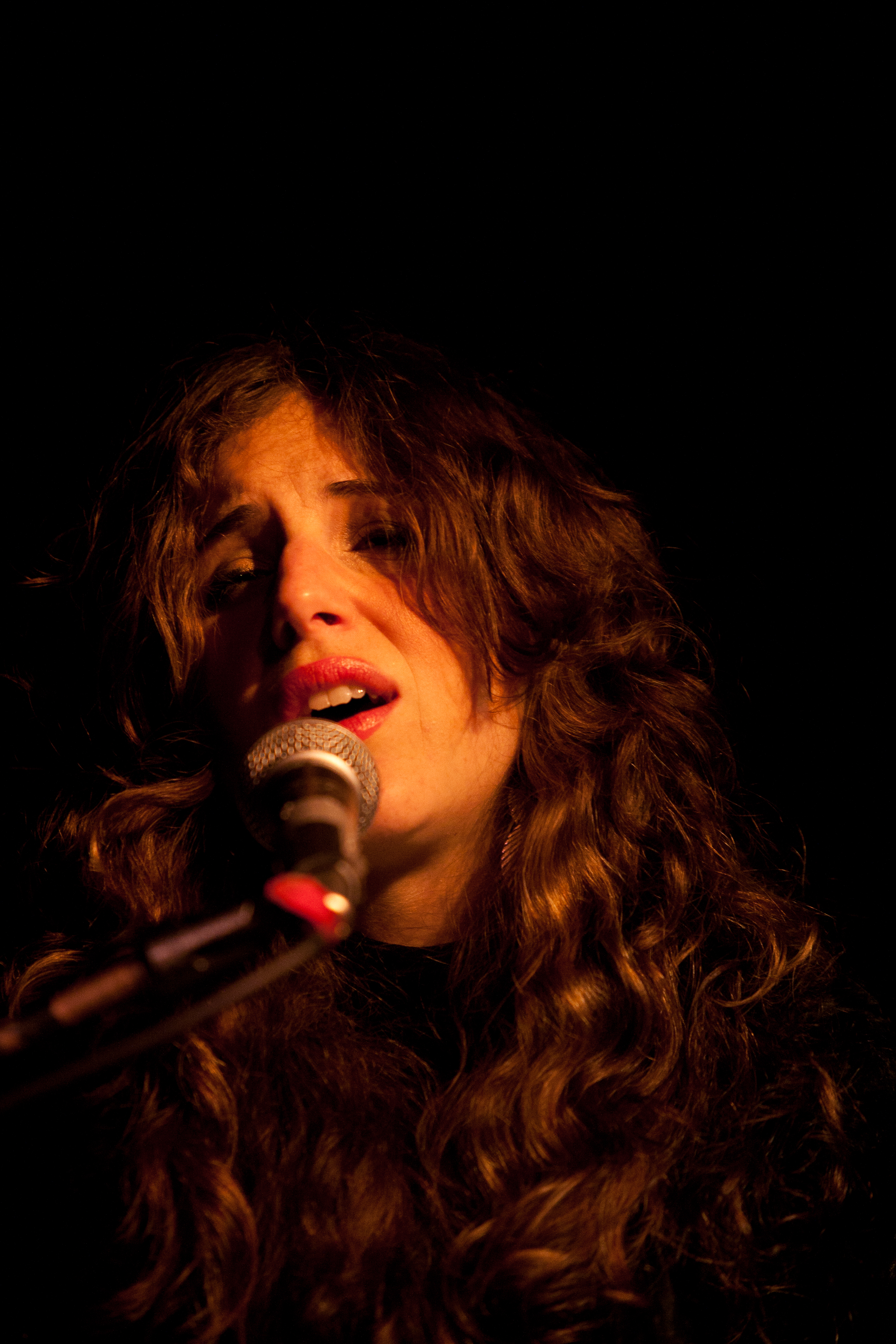
- Vriend in November 2010

Background information
- Born: Vancouver, British Columbia, Canada
- Origin: Edmonton, Alberta, Canada
- Genres: Soul, pop, indie, Americana
- Occupation: Singer-songwriter
- Instrument: Piano
- Years active: 2003 – present
- Website: annvriend.com

Ann Vriend is a Canadian singer-songwriter and pianist based in Edmonton, Alberta.

Vriend has played festivals and venues around the world.

== Recording career ==
Vriend released a popular demo in 2000 which received immediate radio play on stations across western Canada and earned her a spot at the Edmonton Folk Music Festival. A year later she won a songwriting contest which took her to Nashville, Tennessee and helped fund her debut album, Soul Unravelling (2003), which was well received by critics and sold well for an independent release. The album is now in its fifth pressing.

Vriend's second album, Modes of Transport, was released two years later. "Feelin' Fine", the album's first single, was put on heavy rotation by a local adult contemporary/jazz radio station. A third album, When We Were Spies, was released on 11 March 2008. Produced by Juno-nominated Douglas Romanow, it contains fuller production, drawing on modern pop sounds. A single, "St. Paul", received heavy rotation in her hometown of Edmonton and hit the Top 30 on radio stations in Toronto and Cologne (Germany). Vriend's first music video, for "(If We Are Not) Spies", was released in mid-2008.

Love & Other Messes, Vriend's first studio album in almost three years, was released in early 2011. The album features a seven piece band, including vocalists Coco Love Alcorn and Chloe Albert, and includes a duet with Matt Epp. The recording, produced by Vriend herself, was influenced by Nashville, Muscle Shoals, classic R&B and Motown sounds. Vriend released a video for "Graffiti on my Heart". Love & Other Messes was number 1 on the CKUA album charts for two weeks and received a 3.5 star review in the Toronto Star.

In 2011, Vriend provided vocals for a topical single called "William and Kate".

== Live performances ==
Vriend has toured Canada, Australia and Europe extensively, both solo and backed by a band. Live recordings from 2008 and 2009 shows, along with new songs recorded live "off-the-floor", were released in late 2009 as Closer Encounters. She released videos for "A Dollar and a Suitcase" and "On Your Street", the two new songs on the album, in 2010.

Vriend is also the curator and host of the Bluebird North performance series in Edmonton. She also performs with the popular 1980s cover band Valiant Thieves.

== Television ==
In August 2010, Vriend appeared on the Australian music and comedy show Spicks and Specks. She has also been featured on a regional news program in the Netherlands and has performed on network television in Canada and Australia.

== Musical style ==
Vriend's literary writing style reveals the influence of 1970s singer-songwriters such as Paul Simon, Leonard Cohen, and Cat Stevens. Her distinctive voice has been compared to the clear and vulnerable Nashville sound of Dolly Parton, the playfulness of Cyndi Lauper, and the raw power of Aretha Franklin and Etta James.

== Career highlights: 2015 – present ==
- Winner of the 2017 Maple Blues Award "Cobalt Music Prize" for recording and composition "All That I Can"
- May 2017 release (EP) reached No. 1 on CJSR chart (Edmonton), No. 5 on Soundslike Café (Australia), No. 19 on CKUA chart (Canada), No. 90 on North American overall campus charts
- Winner of nation-wide "She's The One" contest at the Ottawa Bluesfest
- Nominated for "Female Artist of the Year" at 2017 Edmonton Music Awards
- Semifinalist at the International Songwriting Competition, pop category
- Selected to showcase at the Reeperbahn Festival, Big Sound, MIDEM, SXSW, Popkomm, NXNE, Contact East, Junofest, Breakout West
- Featured in Songwriter's Association of Canada magazine and Elle magazine
- Appeared on TV talk shows in Germany ("Arte TV"), Australia ("Spicks and Specks, Mornings With Keri Anne"), Canada (CBC National)
- Songs placed on DVD release of Party of 5, Russian film Kitchen In Paris, YouTube online banking ad, short "Toonlife Dating"
- Backing band The Rooster Davis Group semi finalists in the 2016 Memphis Blues Challenge, and winner of the Best Self-Produced Blues Album in Northern Alberta, 2015

== Performance highlights ==
- Kitchener Blues Festival
- Calgary Bluesfest
- Ottawa Bluesfest
- Burlington Sound Of Music Festival
- Edmonton and Calgary Folk Music Festivals
- Woodford Folk Music Festival (Australia)
- Port Fairy Music Festival (Australia)
- Australia Blues Festival
- Lethbridge Jazz and Blues Festival
- Medicine Hat Jazz Festival
- Canadian Cultural Centre in Paris, France
- Vinyl Cafe with Stuart MacClean, CBC Radio
- Radio National (Australia), "The Inside Sleeve"
- Alainait Arts Festival (Iqaluit)
- Neukolner Oper (Berlin)
- Radio Bremen (Germany)
- Canadian Tourism Events (Sydney, London, Melbourne, St. Louis, Washington D.C., Frankfurt)
- The Basement (Sydney)
- Commonwealth Games (Melbourne)
- New York City: Bitter End, CBGB's, Fez, Arlene's Grocery, Rockwood Music Hall
- Koerner Hall (Toronto)
- Canadian Embassy in Brussels for Canada Day celebrations

== Discography ==
- 2003: Soul Unravelling
- 2005: Modes of Transport
- 2007: The Clandestine (EP)
- 2008: When We Were Spies
- 2009: Closer Encounters
- 2011: Love & Other Messes
- 2014: For The People In The Mean Time
- 2017: Everybody's different (EP)
