= Dusty Limits =

Australian singer

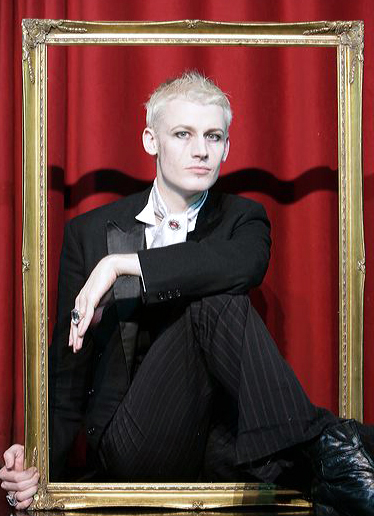
Dusty Limits

Mark McInnes, professionally known as Dusty Limits is an Australian-born cabaret singer and comedian based in the United Kingdom, and one of the leading figures on the "new cabaret" scene.

== Biography ==
Innes is from Brisbane, Queensland, Australia, where he first appeared in cabaret. He made his European debut in 1999. He has a three octave vocal range and is noted for his interpretations of the songs of Kurt Weill, Cole Porter, Noël Coward, Tom Waits, Stephen Sondheim, Jacques Brel, Portishead, Tom Lehrer, David Bowie, Philip Jeays and Nick Cave. He wrote songs, usually with a macabre or satirical twist, including such songs as "I Am A Jolly Self-Harmer", "Cocaine Socialist", "Beaucoup de Lifting", "Is It Too Late?", "Imagine (Think of the Kids)" and "Poor".

Since 1992, he also performed as an actor on stage and film, sometimes also performing under the name of Dorian Black. He performs regularly throughout the UK as a singer, comic and compere, both in solo shows and as part of variety bills. He is the director and compere of the Black Cat Cabaret which appeared at the Café de Paris every Friday in 2013, along with frequent appearances at the Café de Paris and which now takes place at various London venues. He also produced and co-hosted the monthly Savoy Cabaret at the Savoy Hotel.

He was the director and host of Cabaret at Scarfes Bar, which took place monthly at the Rosewood London from 2014 to 2017.

He won the London Cabaret Award for Best Host/Compere in 2012, 2013 and 2015.

He is the Patron of Cabaret vs Cancer, a charity which raises money for cancer relief and research in the UK.

== Work ==
Limits performs throughout the UK and abroad as a cabaret singer, comic and compere.

From 2003 to 2005, he had his own monthly show in London under the titles Dusty Limits and Friends and Dusty Limits Etc. Since 2003, he has performed every year at the Edinburgh Festival Fringe, either in his own one-man cabarets and/or as host and programmer of variety nights including the Vaudeville at the Bongo Club. He hosted the Bongo Club Cabaret in 2012. For a number of years he was a judge and occasionally compere for the Tap Water Awards.

He has appeared on the bill with many of the leading performers in the worlds of neo-Weimar cabaret and burlesque, including Amanda Palmer, Camille O'Sullivan, Justin Bond, Meow Meow, Miss Behave, Empress Stah, Jonny Woo, The Luminescent Orchestrii, Fancy Chance, Paul L Martin, Immodesty Blaize, Kittie Klaw, Roxy Velvet, Gill Manly, Taylor Mac, Amy G, Baby Dee, Daniel Isengart, Ali McGregor, Nathan Evans and Holly Penfield.

In 2004, he performed at the Brisbane International Cabaret Festival. In 2006, he performed at Don't Tell Mama and Joe's Pub in New York City. He also appeared on the bill of Weimar New York at the Spiegeltent in 2007.

In 2003, 2005, 2007, 2008, 2009 and 2010 at the Edinburgh Festival Fringe, Limits hosted a nightly revue at the Bongo Club Cabaret. In 2007, he was winner in the Ministry of Burlesque Awards for both Best Male Singer and Best Male Performer.

In October 2007, he premiered a new show, The Picture of Dusty Limits, dedicated to the themes of decadence and disillusion. It included a number of original songs by himself and his musical collaborator and accompanist, Michael Roulston. It has been reprised several times, being largely rewritten and updated each time. He performed a completely revised version of the show at the Famous Spiegeltent as part of the Edinburgh Fringe 2010, earning 5-star reviews.

In 2008, Limits appeared as a guest performer in the sell-out season of Miss Behave's Variety Nighty at The Roundhouse in Camden, North London. He has also been engaged in writing for Mr Donne's Particular Cabinet, a full-length 'narrative cabaret' show.

From 2007 to 2009, he programmed and hosted a monthly new-cabaret showcase at the Royal Vauxhall Tavern called first Kabarett and then KUNST, which means "art" in German. The night featured both established and up-and-coming performers and has included a number of noteworthy artists on the European cabaret circuit, such as Fancy Chance, Frisky and Mannish, Bourgeois and Maurice, Chrisalys, Desmond O'Connor and Lucifire.

In 2009, he was one of four major neo-cabaret artists to perform as part of Space Oddities, an evening of cabaret dedicated to retro-futurism. The others were Ruby Blues, Jonny Woo and Empress Stah.

He has appeared every year from 2002 in the Battersea Barge pantomime, which he has written and directed several times. He performed as Hildegaard Von Boss in Cinderella and the Glass Ceiling (2010) and Monsieur Wolf in "Red Riding Hoodie" (2011).

In 2008, he co-produced a mock wedding at the Bethnal Green Working Men's Club, in which the elements of the normal wedding service – e.g. the First Reading – became cabaret acts, and which included performances by many of London's top cabaret and burlesque artistes.

In May 2010 and again in 2011, he was one of a handful of top London cabaret artists to perform at the Time Out Alternative Eurovision competition. He performed an original song entitled "Je Suis Eurostar", a parody of Eurovision, under the name 'Dana Euronational'.

He performed in 2010 as part of the Grimeborn Festival in a short experimental opera piece entitled CROW, with music by Michael Roulston. In 2010, he appeared at the Famous Spiegeltent as part of the Edinburgh Fringe Festival in his one-man show The Picture of Dusty Limits, to outstanding reviews.,

At the Fringe in 2011, he performed a new show, Darkling, which dealt with the themes of melancholy and mortality, and which he described as "stand-up misery". It also gained excellent reviews.

Limits was interviewed for the BBC Radio 2 program Come to the Cabaret, which included interviews with Lisa Appignanesi, Paloma Faith, Julian Clary, Amy Saunders, Immodesty Blaize and Barry Cryer and was hosted by Paul O'Grady.

Along with Tricity Vogue, he wrote and performed a season of satirical sketches and songs in the Private Eye Dining Room, upstairs at Norman's Coach and Horses in Soho.

In January 2011, Limits was one of ten cabaret artists, including David Hoyle and Eastend cabaret, who had their own Time Out London cover in a special edition celebrating the resurgence of cabaret.

In 2012, he produced and hosted The Winter of Our Discontent, a satirical/political cabaret at the Arcola Tent that included some of London's top cabaret artists.

His 2012 solo Edinburgh Fringe show, Post-Mortem, was shortlisted for TO&ST (Time Out & Soho Theatre) Award and was performed at the Soho Theatre in July 2013.

In 2013, he took a new show, Psycho, to the Fringe, which included a dozen original songs written with his writing partner Michael Roulston and received excellent reviews.

As well as performing, Limits works as a voice coach, writer and director. He has directed at the Central School of Speech and Drama where he has also delivered lectures on the subject of Kleinkunst. His special area is "narrative cabaret", theatrical work using a cabaret or 'Kleinkunst' format.

In 2015, he released an album of original songs written with composer Michael Roulston, entitled Grin. The funds required to finance recording were raised via a Kickstarter campaign.

== Media ==
=== 2008 ===
Limits was one of three cabaret performers profiled by a Newsweek article examining the resurgence of cabaret, the others being Michael Feinstein and Ute Lemper.

He was featured on the cover of Time Out issue 1958, the Sex and Books issue, as part of a group of five leading burlesque artistes, and solo on page 20 where he was posed reading a book in a standing pose.

Time Out review of 2008 (edition of 18 December) named him as one of the four main neo-cabaret guards, (along with Jonny Woo, Justin Bond and Empress Stah) who had done "exceptional work". In the same issue, he was also one of the 10 "scene leaders" invited to share their personal highlights of the year in the Social Club section feature.

=== 2010 ===
Limits interviewed for BBC Radio 2 program, Come to the Cabaret, hosted by Paul O'Grady. Limits spoke mainly on the history of Berlin cabaret and the role of the Emcee. He was also the Marriage Man in Trapped!: Ever After! on BBC Television.

=== 2011 ===
Limits appears as one of ten 'cover-stars' of a special Time Out edition dedicated to cabaret. Time Out describes him as 'The Trailblazer'.
