= Pot-Pourri (group) =

Members of Pot-Pourri

Pot-Pourri is an Australian opera and musical theatre group who perform a blend of opera, music theatre, cabaret, magic, didgeridoo and comedy both within Australia and internationally. The artists have all performed with Australia's major musical and opera companies.

== History ==
Pot-Pourri began its life at a smoky jazz nightclub Madegans, in Brunswick, Melbourne in 1987 and has since toured overseas on more than 40 occasions and released six CDs. The group began with the aim of making opera and musical theatre accessible to a wider audience.

Performances include sell-out concerts at the Melbourne Concert Hall, Sydney Town Hall, Burswood Theatre, The Plush Room San Francisco, Hong Kong Jockey Club and the Port Fairy Folk Festival. The group has toured throughout many parts of USA, Europe, New Zealand and Asia performing as guest artists with the Seoul Symphony Orchestra, touring major concert halls in Taiwan. They were the only Australian production to be invited to perform at the 2002 International Music Theatre Festival in Korea. Pot-Pourri have performed a season at The Summit Theatre in Japan and were the first Australian artists invited to play at the Macau Cultural Centre, as well as performances in Penang and Hong Kong.

== The Warbles ==
The five classically trained performers also become The Warbles for children's charity The Song Room. The performers take on the personae of Sylvie Soprano, Miffy Mezzo, Terry Tenor, Barry Baritone and Priscilla Pianist, teaching children about opera and classical music.

== Reviews ==
- "The four very talented Pot-Pourri singers … showed both their singing prowess and confidence as performers." – The Dominion Post
- "The group really is a must-see. If you're not a classical buff, this show is your way into the genre in a humorous and very entertaining way." – The Press, Christchurch
- "(Pot-Pourri) have extended the public’s perceptions of opera and music theatre and have developed new audiences on a national and international scale for the performing arts in general." – Yarrawonga Chronicle

== Members ==
=== Current ===
- Tania de Jong – (soprano)
- Rebecca Bode – (soprano)
- Jonathan Bode – (tenor)
- Jonathan Morton – (baritone) and
- Anthony Barnhill – (pianist)

=== Former ===
- Dominique Oyston – (soprano)
- Craig MacDonald – (tenor)
- Rosa Scaffidi – (pianist)
- Adam Przewlocki – (pianist)
- Antoinette Halloran – (soprano)
- Rebecca Chambers – (pianist)

== Discography ==
- 1995: Rhythm of Life
- 1997: Something Familiar!, Something Peculiar!
- 1999: This is the Moment
- 2001: Friends for Life
- 2003: Chanson d'Amour
- 2006: Nella Fantasia
