= Kram (musician) =

Australian musician

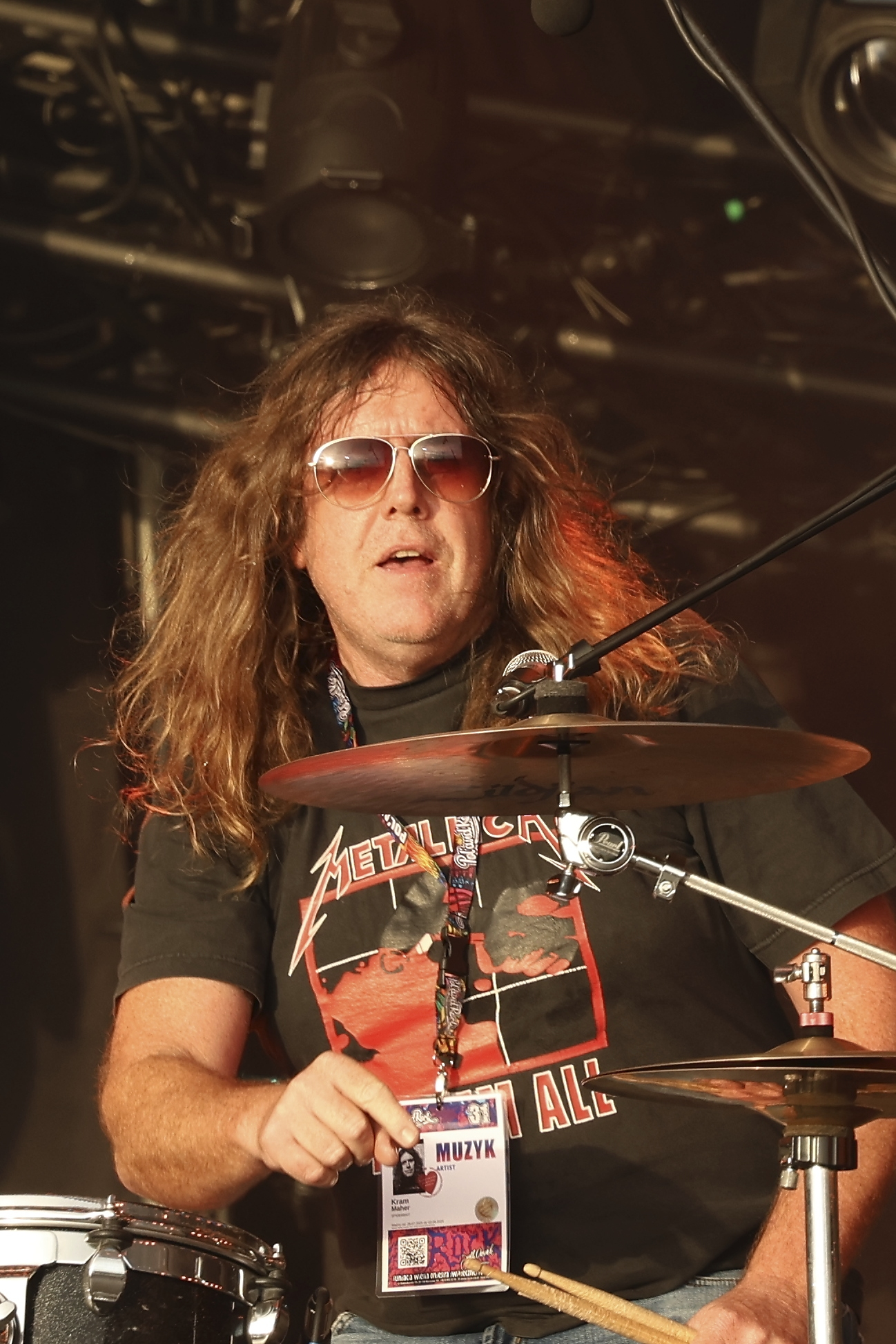
- Kram at the Pol'and'Rock Festival 2025

Background information
- Born: Mark Anthony Maher; Finley, New South Wales, Australia
- Instruments: Drums, vocals
- Years active: 1989–present

Mark Anthony Maher, better known by his stage name Kram, is an Australian musician and the drummer and singer of Spiderbait. His stage name is an anagram of his first name; "Kram" is simply "Mark" spelled backwards. Kram has appeared at the 2005 benefit concert for the South-East Asian tsunami, WaveAid, as a member of supergroup the Wrights who performed Stevie Wright's three-part classic, "Evie".

His debut solo album, Mix Tape, was released on 13 March 2009. He has made guest appearances on the television shows' Talkin' 'Bout Your Generation and Good News Week, both on Network Ten, and Spicks & Specks on the ABC.

== Discography ==
=== Albums ===
List of albums, with selected chart positions
Title	Album details	Peak chart positions
Title	Album details	AUS
Mix Tape	Released: March 2009; Label: Island Australia; Format: CD, digital	30

== Appearances in other media ==
- "The Best Thing" was used in the film Takers (2010).
- "Satellite" was used in the film Easy A (2010).
- "Silk Suits" was used in the CBS TV series Hawaii Five-0 (2010–present), episode 1x10 (Heihei Race), 22 November 2010.
- "Good Love" was used in the film This Means War (2012).
- "Good Love" was also used in Colin McRae's Dirt 2 as part of the in-game soundtrack.
- "Burnin Sands" was used in Suits season 1 episode 2 "Errors and Omissions" (2011) in the locker room scene.
