= Casey Bennetto =

Australian writer and musician

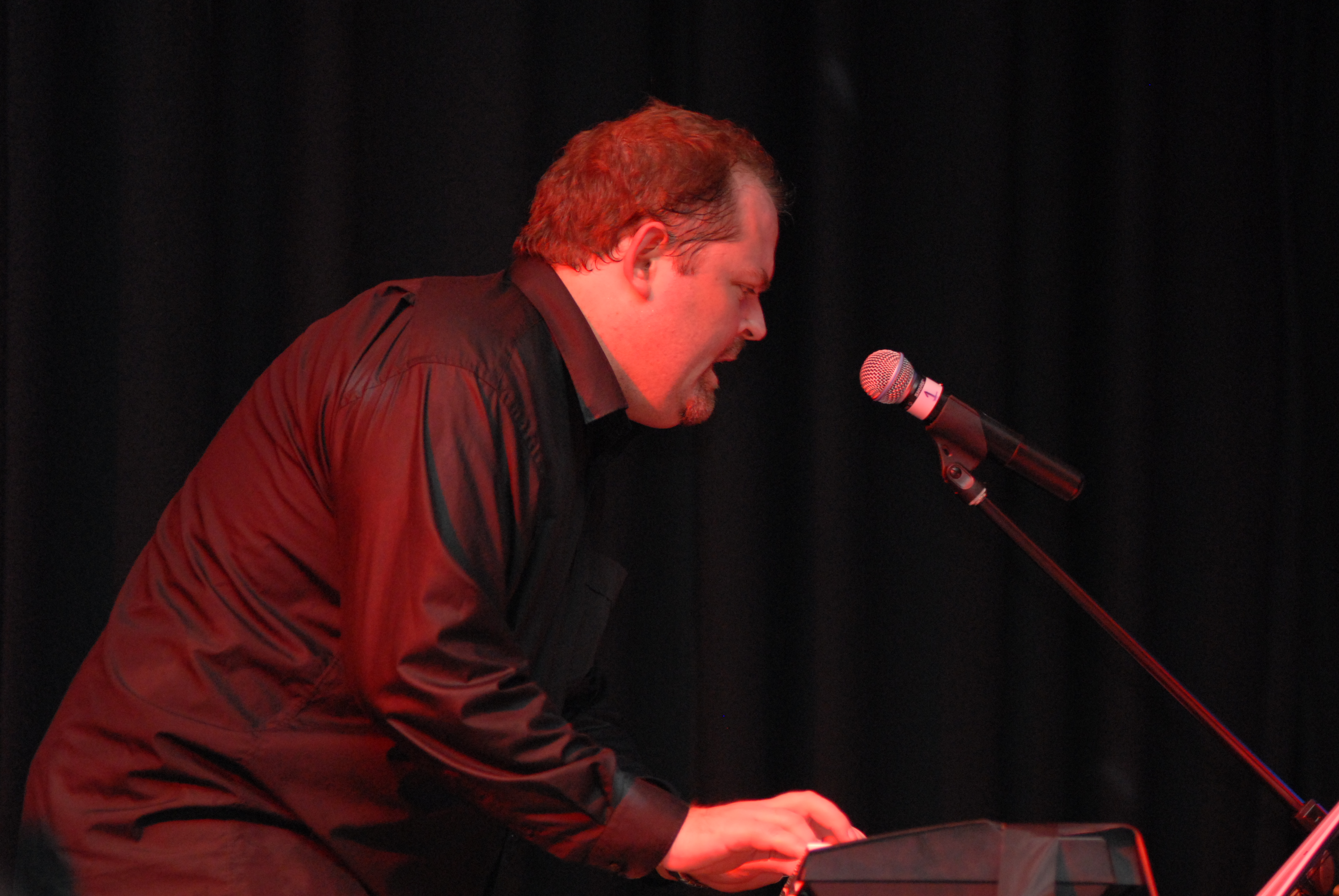
- Bennetto in 2007, performing in the Melbourne International Comedy Festival

Background information
- Born: Mildura, Australia
- Genres: Funk
- Instruments: Vocals, piano, guitar

Casey Bennetto is an Australian writer, musician, performer and radio broadcaster.

Bennetto was born in 1969 in Mildura, Victoria, and grew up in Greensborough, Melbourne.

He wrote and composed the musical Keating! for the Melbourne International Comedy Festival which later received the 2007 Helpmann Award for Best Musical as well as Best Original Score for Bennetto.

Casey has been co-host on The Conversation Hour with Jon Faine on ABC Local Radio in Melbourne. He also co-presents the program Superfluity on community radio station 3RRR. He was a regular guest on television music quiz Spicks and Specks.

In 2015, Bennetto co-wrote the music to a musical about Berrimah women's prison in the Northern Territory, entitled Prison Songs.

In 2020, Bennetto submitted his song "I AM" to "SBS's Eurovision 2020 - Australia Decides", where it was performed by Geraldine Quinn as a contender to become Australia's Eurovision entry.
