= Casey Donovan =

Casey Donovan may refer to:

- Casey Donovan (singer) (born 1988), Australian singer
- Casey Donovan (actor) (1943–1987), American gay pornographic actor
