= Ali McGregor =

Australian soprano opera singer and cabaret performer

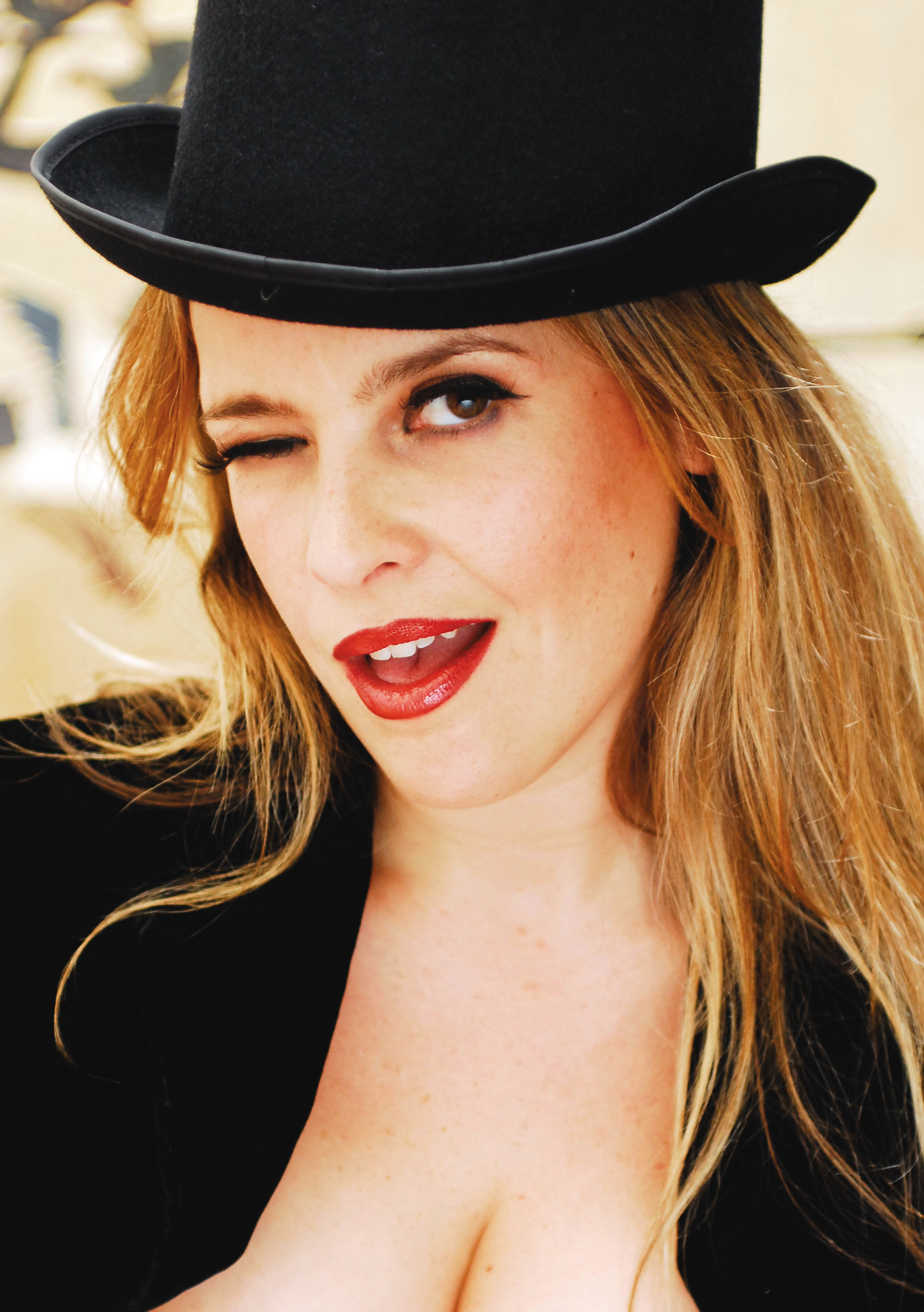
- McGregor's Late-Nite; Variety-Nite Night
- Born: Melbourne, Victoria, Australia
- Occupations: Singer, actress, cabaret performer
- Spouse: Adam Hills (m. 2009)
- Children: 2
- Website: alimcgregor.com

Ali McGregor is an Australian soprano opera singer, actress and cabaret performer. She has performed in operas in the United Kingdom, in Australia and in New Zealand. Her cabaret performances have been seen at festivals in the United Kingdom, Ireland and Australia.

== Career ==
McGregor, who was born in Melbourne, studied music at the Australian National University before completing her Bachelor of Music at the Royal Northern College of Music in Manchester, England as a Peter Moores Scholar. Her first lead role was playing Polly Peachum in Jonathan Miller's production of The Beggar's Opera at Wilton's Music Hall in London. She went on to present La Traviata – Live from Paris for Channel 4 alongside Howard Goodall in 2000.

McGregor was then lured back to Australia by Simone Young to be one of her first Young Artists for Opera Australia. She became a principal soprano with Opera Australia from 2000 until 2005. She played various roles including Zerlina in Don Giovanni, Papagena in The Magic Flute, Marzellina in Fidelio, Yum Yum in The Mikado, Adele in Die Fledermaus, Ninetta in The Love for Three Oranges, The Plaintiff in Trial by Jury and Clorinda in La Cenerentola for which she won a Green Room Award in 2003. She also performed Zerlina for New Zealand Opera in 2005.

In 2018, McGregor developed the operatic cabaret Lorelei based on the myth of the sirens on a rock above the Rhine who lured sailors to their death. The production which featured McGregor, Dimity Shepherd and Antoinette Halloran, opened at the Victorian Opera (Melbourne) and travelled to Opera Queensland in 2020.

=== The Opera Burlesque ===
In 2005 McGregor created the show "The Opera Burlesque" to introduce more people to opera. She was joined by mezzo-soprano Dimity Shepherd and soprano Antoinette Halloran. This show was first performed in The Famous Spiegeltent in Melbourne and later at the Adelaide Fringe Festival. She then took the show to the Edinburgh Festival Fringe in 2006 with soprano Catherine Friel and mezzo-soprano Jacqueline Tate. They performed at the Spiegeltent and later at the Gilded Balloon in 2007. They also performed at Lost Vagueness at the Hackney Empire and Glastonbury Festival and Waterford Festival in Ireland.

=== Cabaret ===
Her solo shows Midnight Lullabies and Evergreens also debuted at The Famous Spiegeltent as well as playing at The Butterfly Club in Melbourne and at Adelaide and Edinburgh Fringe Festivals. In this show she played the autoharp (which has since become her trademark instrument) and was accompanied by the percussionist Ben Hendry. She was a regular member of the Spiegletent's "La Clique – a Sideshow Burlesque" in the Melbourne and Adelaide festivals and at the Edinburgh Fringe from 2005 to 2008.

=== Late-Nite Variety-Nite Night ===
Her variety show Ali McGregor's Late-Nite Variety-Nite Night has become a fixture at The Melbourne International Comedy Festival; guests include Hamish & Andy, Danny Bhoy, Tim Minchin, Eddie Perfect, Julia Zemiro and Rima the Itty-bitty Belly-dancer. In 2007 it debuted at Edinburgh Fringe Festival at the Gilded Balloon. In 2009 she hosted the show at the Assembly Rooms. Her guests included Jimmy Carr, Simon Amstell, Adam Hills, Robin Ince, Frisky & Mannish, Dusty Limits, Ginger & Black, Pete Firman, Lady Carol, The Pajama Men, Wil Anderson, Craig Hill and Tim Key. She also performed on Frank Skinner's Credit Crunch Cabaret, BBC Radio 4's 4 at the Fringe and Nicholas Parsons' Happy Hour at the Edinburgh Fringe.

=== Acting ===
As an actress, McGregor has appeared in various TV commercials in the UK for companies including Norwich Union, BBC, Eircell, Pontiac Grand Prix, Bliss Jewellery and BN Biscuits. She has also appeared as Polly Peachum/Grace Madden for the Sydney Theatre Company and the Out of Joint Theatre Company directed by Max Stafford-Clark which played in Sydney and then went on to tour the UK in 2009.

=== Other work ===
McGregor was an occasional guest panellist on the ABC music quiz show Spicks and Specks which was hosted by her husband Adam Hills.

== Personal life ==
McGregor is married to Australian comedian Adam Hills. They have 2 daughters.

== Awards and nominations ==
=== ARIA Music Awards ===
The ARIA Music Awards is an annual ceremony presented by Australian Recording Industry Association (ARIA), which recognise excellence, innovation, and achievement across all genres of the music of Australia. They commenced in 1987.

Year	Nominee / work	Award	Result	Ref.
2014	Ali McGregor's Jazzamatazz	Best Children's Album	Nominated	
