= Barry Morgan (character) =

- Portrayed by: Stephen Teakle

In-universe information
- Gender: Male
- Occupation: Organ salesman
- Family: Nancy (mother; deceased)

Barry Morgan is the eponymous character in Barry Morgan's World of Organs, a stage show based on a fictional electronic organ salesman from Adelaide portrayed by Australian musician and comedian Stephen Teakle. Barry Morgan's World of Organs has appeared at the New Zealand International Comedy Festival and the Edinburgh Fringe Festival, and has been a guest on ABC1's Spicks and Specks, ABC2's The Marngrook Footy Show and on FIVEaa radio.

== Background ==
Campari-drinking Morgan owns Barry Morgan's World of Organs, a fictional, kitsch organ emporium in Adelaide's Sunnyside Mall. He plays a 1981 Hammond Aurora Classic organ through a Leslie speaker, and demonstrates the organ's abilities as a synthesizer, the Auto Vari 64 (for adding variation to the accompaniment) and the Zither arpeggiator. He is the proponent of the "one finger method" to control his organ's accompaniment section. He makes the one finger method accessible by scaffolding the touch and release technique.

Barry Morgan's World Of Organs is also cited by Australian cult sonic psychology band "Organ Grinder" (featuring members from noted Australian heavy metal bands Misery and Vegas Rhythm Kings). The band cites Morgan's World of Organs as their number 1 supplier in all things musical.

== Reception ==
Professional ratings
Review scores
Source	Rating
The List	4/5 stars
Fest Magazine	2/5 stars
ThreeWeeks	3/5 stars
SGFringe	4/5 stars
Herald Sun	4/5 stars

Morgan has been described as a cult figure, drawing reviews comparing his appearance to those of Wes Anderson and David Dickinson. Time Out listed Morgan as "critics' choice". His appearances at the 2012 Edinburgh Festival Fringe gained him 3 and 4 star reviews from publications such as ThreeWeeks and The List.
