= Josh Earl (comedian) =

Australian comedian and TV presenter

- Born: 26 June 1981 (age 45); Burnie, Tasmania, Australia
- Occupations: Comedian, television and radio presenter, musician
- Spouse: Married
- Children: 2

Josh Earl (born 26 June 1981) is an Australian stand-up comedian, television and radio presenter, musician and formerly worked in a school library. He was the presenter of the short-lived revival version of the ABC's musical quiz show Spicks and Specks that ran from 5 February to 19 December 2014.

== Career ==
Among Earl's many comedy performances have been Josh Earl is a Librarian which has been performed in Adelaide and Melbourne, and Josh Earl vs. The Australian Women's Weekly Children's Birthday Cake Book, which toured Victoria and interstate venues.

Earl's radio appearances include the Lime Champions sketch show on Melbourne FM radio 3RRR and appearances on Triple J and radio 774 ABC Melbourne.

His television performances include the original Spicks and Specks show, Talkin' 'Bout Your Generation and Adam Hills Tonight.

Earl has also appeared over nine times at the Melbourne International Comedy Festival.

== Awards ==
- Perth Fringe Festival 2012 – Best Comedy

== Personal life ==
Earl is married and has two children.
