= Antoinette Halloran =

Australian operatic soprano

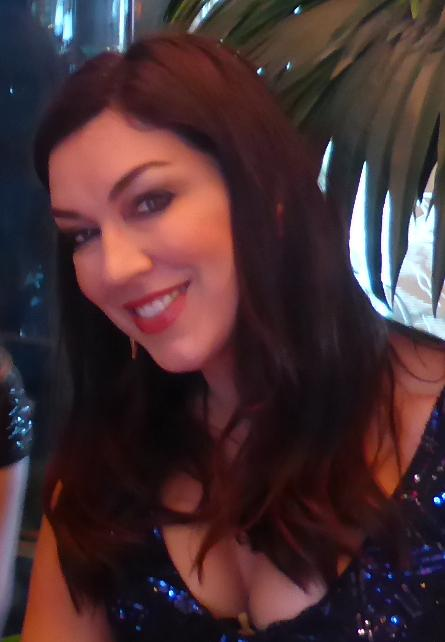
Halloran in 2016

Antoinette Halloran is an Australian operatic soprano.

== Education ==
Antoinette Halloran grew up in the Melbourne suburbs of Rosanna and Deer Park. She attended Mac.Robertson Girls' High School and is a graduate of the Victorian College of the Arts where she won the Mabel Kent Scholarship and completed a Diploma of Arts (Voice); she has an honours degree in music from the University of Melbourne.

== Early career ==
In 1997, Halloran appeared in the Australian film True Love and Chaos as a country and western singer. She also appeared on the 2000 album Since I Left You by the Australian electronic music group The Avalanches.

In 1999, she sang Madam Olga in a national tour of Lehár's The Merry Widow and the Mona Lisa for the Australian premiere of the musical Leonardo the Musical: A Portrait of Love. In 2000, Halloran was cast by the New York producers of Forbidden Broadway to perform opposite Philip Gould in the Melbourne season. In 2002, she appeared as Sophie de Palma in the national touring production of Master Class.

She performed Mimì in Puccini's La bohème for Oz Opera (the touring arm of Opera Australia); reprising the role several times in her career. In November 2002 she sang the title role in Jonathan Mills' The Ghost Wife at the Barbican Centre in London with Richard Gill conducting.

She played Gilda in Rigoletto – a perversion and Desdemona in Otello – a subversion for Theatre Works in their Verdi trilogy.

For Chamber Made Opera, Halloran has performed roles in Dominique Probst's Motherland of the Foreign Son and in Elena Kats-Chernin's Matricide – the Musical.

In 2004, she toured Japan as Carlotta in Ken Hill's Phantom of the Opera and played the role of Mrs Segstrom for the Melbourne Theatre Company in their production of Sondheim's A Little Night Music in Melbourne and Sydney. She won the Puccini Foundation Award of the Australian Acclaim Awards helping her to study with Italian soprano Carla Maria Izzo, and perform the roles of Kate Pinkerton in Puccini's Madama Butterfly and Prima Ancella in Turandot at the Festival Puccini in Torre del Lago, Italy. She represented Australia at the International Hans Gabor Belvedere Singing Competition, hosted by the Wiener Kammeroper.

In 2006, she appeared with Ali McGregor and Dimity Shepherd in the show Opera Burlesque in the Spiegeltent "La Gayola" at the Edinburgh Festival

Roles for Opera Australia include Mimì in La bohème, Despina in Mozart's Così fan tutte, Gianetta in Gilbert and Sullivan's The Gondoliers and Josephine in H.M.S. Pinafore, Ellen in Delibes' Lakmé. On 14 January 2009, she stepped in as understudy for Cheryl Barker to sing Cio-Cio San in Madama Butterfly.

For Melbourne Opera she has sung Cio-Cio San in Madama Butterfly, Donna Elvira in Mozart's Don Giovanni, Pamina in The Magic Flute and Fiordiligi in Così fan tutte. Halloran sang Fiordiligi for the inaugural season of Victorian Opera in 2006.

The same year she also appeared as a judge and panelist on the ABC Television series Operatunity Oz, and she appeared regularly on the ABC show Spicks and Specks.

In 2007, Halloran sang the title role in Antonín Dvořák's Rusalka (in Czech), a highly acclaimed Stella in the Australian premiere of Previn's A Streetcar Named Desire which won her a Helpmann Award nomination for best "Best female performer in a supporting role in an opera", and Johanna Barker in Sondheim's Sweeney Todd for Opera Australia.

In 2008 she sang again Cio-Cio San and Mimì both for Opera Australia and, in a different production, for New Zealand Opera, and Adina in Donizetti's L'elisir d'amore for Victorian Opera. Halloran sang the title role in Tosca for Melbourne Opera in 2009 and again in 2017 for the West Australian Opera. In 2010, she sang the title role in The Merry Widow for Opera Queensland (her Brisbane début) and Rosalinde in Die Fledermaus for Opera Australia.

== Established career ==
She returned to Victorian Opera in 2017 as The Fox Zlatohřbítek in Leoš Janáček's The Cunning Little Vixen. In 2018, Halloran, Dimity Shepherd and Ali McGregor appeared in a new work, Lorelei, for Victorian Opera (Melbourne); this production travelled in 2020 to Opera Queensland. Melbourne Opera mounted Wagner's Der Ring des Nibelungen at the Ulumbarra Theatre in Bendigo in 2023, Halloran sang the role of the valkyrie Brünnhilde, who appears in three operas of the tetralogy.

== Concert performances ==
Halloran's concert performances include Mozart's Requiem with the Hong Kong Philharmonic Orchestra, Orff's Carmina Burana with the Melbourne Chorale, John Adams' El Niño with Sydney Philharmonia, Haydn’s Creation and Fauré's Requiem with the Royal Melbourne Philharmonic. She has appeared in concert with Elvis Costello and the Brodsky Quartet for the Sydney Festival. Halloran has also been invited as guest soloist with the Adelaide, Canberra, Melbourne, Tasmanian symphony orchestras and with the Sydney Philharmonia Choirs. In 2017, she accompanied José Carreras on the Australian leg of his world farewell tour.

== Corporate ventures ==
Halloran originally performed with the classical performance group Pot-Pourri; having also reached an advanced level of classical ballet, she became later their choreographer and artistic consultant.

Antoinette Halloran, Dimity Shepherd, Emily Whelan, Tiffany Speight, Danielle Calder, Ali McGregor form the group DivasInc ("Undercover Operators"), which specialises in bringing theatrical entertainment to corporate functions and concerts like Carols by Candlelight.

== Personal life ==
Halloran is married to tenor James Egglestone; they have two children.

== Recordings ==
- Rhythm of Life (1995) (with Pot-Pourri), Move Records, Cat. No.: MCD058
- Something Familiar! Something Peculiar! (1997) (with Pot-Pourri), Move Records, Cat. No.: MCD086
- Puccini Romance, ABC Classics, Cat. No.: 476 6404

Arias and duets (With Rosario La Spina) from La bohème, Tosca, Le Villi, La fanciulla del West, La rondine, Turandot, Madama Butterfly

- A Night at the Opera – The Greatest Arias & Duets, ABC Classics, Cat. No.: 476 6743

"O soave fanciulla" (La bohème); "Un bel dì, vedremo" (Madama Butterfly); "Viene la sera" (Madama Butterfly)
