= Keating! =

Sung-through musical portraying Paul Keating

- The Musical We Had To Have
- Poster for the Company B production
- Music: Casey Bennetto
- Lyrics: Casey Bennetto
- Book: Casey Bennetto
- Basis: The life of Paul Keating
- Productions: 2005–2006 Australian tour (Drowsy Drivers); 2006–2008 Australian tour (Company B); 2010 Theatre Royal, Hobart (Old Nick Company)
- Awards: 2005 MICF Barry Award; 2005 MICF Golden Gibbo Award; 2005 The Age Critics' Award; 2006 Green Room Award for Best Original Score; 2006 Helpmann Award for Best Original Score; 2007 Helpmann Award for Best Musical; 2008 Helpmann Award for Best Regional Touring Production

Keating! is a sung-through musical which portrays the political career of former Australian Prime Minister Paul Keating. Keating was Prime Minister between 1991 and 1996; the musical follows him from his ascent to the leadership through to his eventual electoral defeat by John Howard. It was written by Casey Bennetto, who was inspired to write the show by his disappointment at the results of the 2004 federal election, which saw Howard's Coalition government returned for a fourth term. The musical takes a humorous, satirical tone and presents a positive image of Keating while frequently criticising the Howard government. Bennetto describes the show as "ridiculously pro-Paul Keating".

Originally performed by musical group the Drowsy Drivers, the show achieved rapid success from its low-budget premiere at the 2005 Melbourne International Comedy Festival where it enjoyed a sold-out run and won an unprecedented three festival awards. In 2006, Neil Armfield directed an extended Company B production of Keating!, now with two acts and six new songs written by Bennetto. The Company B production toured Australia, receiving favourable reviews and winning Helpmann Awards for Best Musical and Best Regional Touring Production. In 2008 a live recording of the show was broadcast nationally on ABC2; it was released on DVD in November 2008, through Madman Entertainment.

== Background ==
Paul Keating was the Labor Prime Minister of Australia from 1991 to 1996, ascending to the office after two leadership challenges against his predecessor, Bob Hawke. As Prime Minister, he was interested in a "big picture" approach to government, engaging with issues such as a closer relationship with Asia, Aboriginal reconciliation and the formation of an Australian republic. His government was defeated in the 1996 federal election by the Liberal-National Coalition under John Howard. Writer Casey Bennetto was inspired to write a musical about Keating following his disappointment at the result of the 2004 federal election, which saw the Howard government returned for a fourth term. "It was time to have a laugh at it," he said. He says Keating's story appealed to him because of its classic dramatic structure, that of a man who struggles, "makes it to the top" and must compete against "three bad guys"—successive Opposition leaders John Hewson, Alexander Downer and John Howard. Bennetto believed Keating's colourful personality made him an "ideal" character for musical theatre, citing the former Prime Minister's reputation for being sharp-tongued, wearing Zegna suits and collecting antique clocks. Bennetto wrote the show in eight weeks, drawing on Keating biography Recollections of a Bleeding Heart by Don Watson. He describes it as a "ridiculously pro-Paul Keating" piece which ultimately aims to be funny and entertaining.

== Production history ==
Originally performed by musical group the Drowsy Drivers, Keating! premiered at the 2005 Melbourne International Comedy Festival as a low-budget, single-act show in a 100-seat venue at the Melbourne Trades Hall. Mike McLeish played the lead role, with Bennetto as "the three Hs – Hawke, Hewson and Howard", Enio Pozzebon as Gareth Evans and Cam Rogers as Alexander Downer. Despite the musical's success in Melbourne, Bennetto did not have any plans for Keating! after the end of the comedy festival. However, producer Catherine Woodfield (Bennetto's partner and Trades Hall publican) insisted they develop it further. Between 2005 and 2006 they took it on tour across Australia, including a week of shows in the Sydney Opera House, a return season at Melbourne's Trades Hall, a two-week season at the Adelaide Cabaret Festival, a week of shows at the Brisbane Powerhouse and two nights in Darwin.

Also in 2006, renowned director Neil Armfield offered to direct a production of Keating! at Sydney's Belvoir St Theatre with Company B. For the Company B production Bennetto reworked the musical into a two-act piece, writing six new songs for the show. Of the original cast, only McLeish, Pozzebon and Bennetto were retained; McLeish returned as Keating and Pozzebon as Evans, while Bennetto took on the roles of Hewson and Downer. Terry Serio joined the cast as Hawke and Howard. Bennetto says that both he and McLeish were worried that Armfield would turn "relatively simply staged, roughly hewn" musical into "the Amadeus version" without the original show's sense of fun, but instead felt it became a "more accomplished, buffed-up version of the original show".

The Company B version of Keating! enjoyed sold-out seasons in Melbourne, Sydney, Adelaide, Brisbane, Perth, Canberra, Wollongong, Albany and elsewhere (including a run of shows at the 2007 Melbourne International Comedy Festival) before coming to a close on 31 August 2008. On 20 August 2008, ABC2 broadcast a live performance of the show from Sydney's Seymour Centre. The recording was released on DVD by Madman Entertainment in November 2008.

== Response ==
The premiere of the Drowsy Drivers' production at the 2005 Melbourne International Comedy Festival was met with enthusiastic reviews. Comedian Chris Addison praised the musical as "the best show I've seen at this festival in five years" and The Age's Daniel Ziffer described it as "clever and superbly funny". Within the first week it had become one of the most popular shows of the festival, having sold out by the fifth show. By the end of its Melbourne run, the show had won three major festival awards—the Barry, The Age Critics' Award and the Golden Gibbo—the first time any production had ever done so. For the songs of Keating!, Bennetto won both the 2006 Helpmann and Green Room Awards for best original musical score.

The Company B version also received strong reviews, with a writer in Brisbane's Courier-Mail describing it as "brilliantly satirical" and a reviewer in Melbourne's Age awarding it the top rating of five stars. However Paul Sheehan, writing for the Sydney Morning Herald, criticised the musical's pro-Keating bias, calling the script "preachy and safe" and an insult to those who voted for Howard. In 2007 it won the Helpmann Award for Best Musical, as well as the awards for best direction for Armfield and best actor in a supporting role for Serio. The following year it won another Helpmann for best regional touring production. By the end of its 2007 Sydney season, it had taken $500,000 in box office earnings, and by its final show in 2008 its total audience had reached over 223,000 people across Australia.

Keating, who has attended the show multiple times, believes that it is popular because politics and public life today are without humour. "The game is very dour," he says, "But satire can get a lot across. It can cut out the humbug." He believes another reason is an increased interest in the unsettled issues in the national debate, such as the question of a republic. Downer has also seen the show and commented afterwards that he enjoys satire and thought "Keating! the musical was far better than Keating the prime minister."

== Synopsis ==
The following summary refers to the extended, two-act version of the musical.

=== Act One ===
The show begins with Bob Hawke introducing the political situation of 1990 and the contrasting personalities of Hawke—with his enthusiasm for "footy" and cricket—and his deputy, Paul Keating, who is fond of "the works of Mahler" ("My Right Hand Man"). While Hawke admires Keating's economic prowess, he is perplexed by the other man's "un-Australian" interests. Keating emerges and shares some of his life story and his hopes to gain the leadership from Hawke as they had agreed to in a deal known as the Kirribilli Agreement for the venue at which it was reached ("Do It in Style"). However, Hawke reneges on the deal and Keating returns to the back bench. In a rock ballad, vaguely in the style of Queen, he sings of his desolation before resolving to challenge for the Prime Ministership ("I Remember Kirribilli"). He confronts Hawke with the blue-eyed soul-style "It's Time"; the song refers to the name of former Prime Minister Gough Whitlam's famous 1970s campaign and uses Keating's fondness for collecting antique clocks as a motif for his belief that it is indeed time for a change of leadership. Keating becomes Prime Minister and sings of his ambitions for the nation—including a treaty with Indigenous Australians, an Australian republic and improved relationships with Australia's Asian neighbours—in a reggae song ("Ruler of the Land").

As Keating celebrates his success, Gareth Evans cautions that the political life of a Prime Minister is limited in the minor-key Latin tune "The Beginning Is The End". Both he and the ghost of Gough Whitlam counsel Keating to "maintain your rage". Keating then faces off against Opposition Leader John Hewson in a freestyle rap battle, arguing over the merits of Hewson's "Fightback!" policy platform, with Keating winning the battle due to his superior command of colourful invective, much of which is drawn from actual Keating quotes ("On The Floor"). Angered, Hewson challenges Keating to call an early election, but Keating refuses in the song "I Wanna Do You Slowly". The song's title again refers to a well-known Keating quote, but takes on a sexual interpretation in the slow, Barry White-style funk number. The Keating government contests the 1993 federal election, and in an animated video Kerry O'Brien, Michael Kroger, Robert Ray and Antony Green report on the incoming results in scat over ukulele ("Antony Green"). Labor wins, and Keating sings about the unexpected victory as "the sweetest victory of all", using a famous phrase from his actual election night speech ("Sweet").

=== Act Two ===
In the ska tune "The Arse End of the Earth", which refers to Keating's private description of Australia, both Keating and Evans complain about the day-to-day issues of the economy and their unfavourable portrayal in the commercial media getting in the way of their larger agenda, including republicanism, a new flag, and Aboriginal reconciliation. Alexander Downer replaces Hewson as Opposition Leader for a short and unsuccessful period. In a costume of fishnets, corsetry and lipstick that alludes to a photograph of the actual Downer posing in fishnet stockings for a competition, he sings his belief that he is just "too freaky" for the leadership ("Freaky"). Meanwhile, Evans has an extramarital affair with Australian Democrats leader Cheryl Kernot (typically played by a male) ("Heavens, Mister Evans"). In an understated minor-key bossa nova song, Keating sings of the need to recognise and apologise for the damage done by white colonisation and subsequent subjugation of the Australian Aboriginal population ("Redfern"), before segueing into a more upbeat mambo about the Mabo decision by the High Court of Australia and his attempts to use the decision to promote a reconciliation agenda ("Ma(m)bo").

John Howard becomes leader of the Opposition, presenting a new threat to Keating. Howard describes his intense desire for power and his thirst for revenge against the petty humiliations put on him as a child in a menacing minor-key march ("Power"). However, in the media he presents himself as "a normal bloke and nothing more" ("The Mateship"). Through various costume changes, he attempts to cast himself as a sports fan, a friend of the Australian soldier and a farmer, though the song implies that these are only costumes. The song also refers to the "children overboard" affair, his criticism of political correctness, and his use of immigration as a political issue, some of which occurred after the actual Howard's subsequent election to Prime Minister. In a slow rock duet, Keating and Howard both beseech voters to "Choose Me". However, as the 1996 electoral polls close, Keating concludes that he is doomed electorally. He sings of his unachieved dreams and with some bitterness at what he sees as the backward-looking message of his opponent in a country-influenced ballad referring to former Labor Prime Minister Ben Chifley's description of Labor's overarching goals ("The Light on the Hill").

In the final number, "Historical Revisionism", the election tightens dramatically and the results come to hang on a single polling booth—the theatre in which the musical is playing. Keating wins and Howard concedes with the line "Well, I'm sorry... that I lost!" (a reference to his unwillingness to support a formal apology to the Aboriginal people). As the song's title indicates, the actual Keating did not win the 1996 election. The song segues into a reprise of "Ruler of the Land".

== Music ==
The songs of Keating! employ a wide range of musical styles, including bossa nova, blues, rap, reggae, soul, swing and beer-barrel waltz. Mara Lazzarotto Davis has written an academic study of Casey Bennetto's "Keating!" as a generic hybrid - deftly blending vaudeville, theatre and musical comedy (""Flicking the Switch: Vaudeville Traditions and Myth-Making in Keating!" in Sydney Undergraduate Journal of Musicology, Vol. 5, December 2015). The lyrics frequently draw on quotes from the real Keating and other political figures, particularly in "On The Floor" which contains numerous verbatim quotes from Keating's debates with Hewson. In expanding the show for the Company B production Bennetto wrote six new songs, adding an Act One "curtain" number ("Sweet"), an exploration of Keating's time in office ("The Arse End of the Earth"), two songs on Aboriginal reconciliation and native title ("Redfern" and "Ma(m)bo") and another song for Howard ("The Mateship"). "Dogs of Damnation", a song from the original version in which Evans warns Keating that his political life is limited, was replaced by the similarly themed "The Beginning Is The End".

A live recording of the original single-act version played at the Sydney Opera House was released in 2006 by Bella Union Enterprises and is available through the Drowsy Drivers' Keating! website. In 2007 Company B released a cast recording of the extended show containing all of the musical numbers featured on stage except for "Antony Green". The CD features the Company B production's original cast, with McLeish as Keating, Serio as Hawke and Howard, Bennetto as Hewson and Downer, Pozzebon as Evans and Mick Stuart as Kernot. The band consists of Alon Ilsar (drums), Eden Ottignon (bass), Pozzebon (keyboards), Guy Strazz (acoustic guitar) and Mick Stuart (electric guitar). By 2008, the CD had sold over 5,000 copies. Also that year, a live recording of the extended version was performed at Sydney's Seymour Centre. Among the audience members who attended the recording, the real-life Keating and Cheryl Kernot made an appearance. The recording is currently available on DVD.

=== Musical numbers ===
Act One

- My Right Hand Man – Hawke
- Do It in Style – Keating
- I Remember Kirribilli – Keating
- It's Time – Keating and Hawke
- Ruler of the Land – Keating
- The Beginning Is The End – Keating, Evans and Whitlam
- On The Floor – Keating and Hewson
- I Wanna Do You Slowly – Keating and Hewson
- Antony Green – Reporters
- Sweet – Keating

Act Two

- The Arse End of the Earth – Keating and Evans
- Freaky – Downer
- Heavens, Mister Evans – Evans and Kernot
- Redfern – Keating
- Ma(m)bo – Keating
- Power – Howard
- The Mateship – Howard
- Choose Me – Keating and Howard
- The Light on the Hill – Keating
- Historical Revisionism – Scrutineer, Keating and Howard

== See also ==
- TONY! The Blair Musical
