= Spicks and Specks (TV series) =

Australian music TV series

- Presented by: Adam Hills; Josh Earl
- Starring: Alan Brough; Myf Warhurst; Ella Hooper; Adam Richard
- Theme music composer: Barry Gibb
- Opening theme: "Spicks and Specks"
- Country of origin: Australia
- Original language: English
- No. of seasons: 12
- No. of episodes: 348 (list of episodes)

Production
- Running time: 30 minutes (2005–14, 2024); 60 minutes (2018–20); 50 minutes (2021–22)

Original release
- Network: ABC Television
- Release: 2 February 2005 – 23 November 2011
- Network: ABC1
- Release: 2 May – 19 December 2014
- Network: ABC TV
- Release: 4 November 2018 – present

Spicks and Specks is an Australian music-themed comedic television quiz show in which host Adam Hills asks two teams of three people each music-themed questions in different games. Team leaders are Myf Warhurst and Alan Brough. Members of each team vary from episode to episode; one per team generally comes from the world of music and the other from comedy. Scores are kept, but the prize for the winners is simply personal satisfaction. Many games are named after, or otherwise reference, well known song titles.

The series originally aired on ABC1 at 8:30pm on Wednesday nights, with the show repeated on Thursdays on ABC2 at 8pm. The previous year's season was repeated every Friday at 2:30pm on ABC1. After the show's end in 2011, and an unsuccessful 2014 relaunch featuring new hosts, a 2018 reunion special with the original hosts aired, the success of which ensured a few more themed specials, and an eventual revival of the show.

== Format ==
The show's general style, employing a mix of music and comedy, is similar to the British show Never Mind the Buzzcocks and fellow Australian TV show RocKwiz, but the question formats and program style (Satirical vs. Family vs. Pub Quiz) are different.

Although there are no prizes for the winners, on rare occasions Hills decides to award some convenient prop for comedic effect – a "Fools' Gold" sandwich very similar (they used strawberry jam as opposed to grape jam) to that eaten by Elvis, for example.

The show takes both its name and theme music from the Bee Gees' 1966 song, "Spicks and Specks". The theme music was performed and produced by The Dissociatives, a duo consisting of Silverchair singer Daniel Johns and dance musician Paul Mac, and replaced all the lyrics bar the title refrain with scat singing. In addition, Mac once appeared on the show as a panellist.

The show is hosted by stand-up comedian Adam Hills who poses questions to two three-person teams each headed by a permanent team captain, actor/comedian/author Alan Brough and radio announcer Myf Warhurst.

Notable games in the show include: Substitute, in which one member from each team sings three well-known tunes, substituting unrelated words from a text provided by Hills, while the other team members have to name the song; Musician or Serial Killer, in which each team member is shown a photograph of a person and is asked to identify whether that person is a musician or a serial killer; and The Final Countdown, always the final game of each program, in which members of both teams compete to be first to attempt to answer general questions on music.

== History ==
=== Original series (2005–2011) ===
Guest team members, who varied from week to week, included some regulars: Hamish Blake, Jason Byrne, Frank Woodley, Colin Lane, Ross Noble, James Morrison, Renée Geyer, Ella Hooper, Meshel Laurie, Denise Scott, Antoinette Halloran and Dave O'Neil. With the exception of Dave O'Neil, Blake appeared more often than any other guest panellist, and his comparative lack of musical knowledge was a running gag.

In 2007 during a game called Kid's Music Special, the question "What children's song is contained in the song Down Under?" led to music publisher, Larrikin Music, taking legal action against Men at Work songwriters Colin Hay and Ron Strykert over the main flute riff. After three years of litigation, the lawsuit was settled in favour of Larrikin Music after Down Under was deemed to have used key elements of the Australian children's nursery rhyme Kookaburra.

The show returned for its seventh season on 4 May 2011. On 25 May 2011, the ABC announced the seventh season would be last, with the last program on 23 November 2011. Hills, Warhurst, and Brough had agreed upon a "one in, all in" plan, and wanted to make sure the show didn't drag on.

=== Spicks and Speck-tacular ===
In 2011, it was announced that Hills, Warhurst, and Brough would take the popular TV format on a farewell tour, in the "Spicks and Speck-tacular - The Finale" tour. The tour comprised 32 shows in nine cities across Australia, and was "loosely based" on the series.

=== 2014 relaunch ===
The ABC announced on 28 November 2012, during its 2013 program launch, that Spicks and Specks would be returning in the new year with comedian Josh Earl hosting, and musician Ella Hooper and comedian Adam Richard as the team captains. The re-launch of the series was delayed by the broadcaster until 2014, with the first episode airing on 5 February.

The revival was axed after 20 episodes due to low ratings, with the final six recorded episodes airing over the summer non-ratings period.

=== Themed specials (2018–2020) ===
In August 2018, it was announced that the show would be brought back with Hills, Brough, and Warhurst for a reunion episode later that year. After the episode's success, four more specials, each with a different theme, were commissioned through the end of 2020.

=== Relaunch (2021–present) ===
In 2021, the ABC announced a new 10-episode series, hosted by Adam Hills and the original team leaders. Much like those specials and the 2014 series, it featured new games along with classic games, with Know Your Product, Look What They've Done to My Song, Ma, Substitute, and The Final Countdown all appearing in every episode.

The series was filmed during the COVID-19 pandemic while "stage four lockdown" was occurring, leading to some minor changes to the show's set, which was redesigned to have a curved outline, and solo buzzers instead of a single team buzzer. Physical comedy was frequently used in the rebooted series, which mostly came from Dave O'Neil, who appeared as a guitarist, a banana, a lost luggage collector, an ice cream van owner, a mobile DJ, the sole owner of Kurt Cobain's MTV Unplugged guitar, a Zoom comedian who has a puppet bat, a bootleg merchandise seller, and a "Dave-A-Roo" deliveryman.

The ABC renewed the series for a second season in 2022, this time with a live audience. The second season premiered on 7 August 2022. Following the death of Queen Elizabeth II, the season's sixth episode was pushed back by a week. The show returned in 2024 with shorter episodes.

== Games ==
In the majority of games, each team gets its own questions to answer — although the other team members may answer the question if the first team doesn't know it. In the remaining games, both teams can answer the questions.

=== Original series (2005–2011) ===
Games begun in the original series included:

- Know Your Product: Each team captain chooses one of four given topics. There are three questions from the topic that either team can answer. The questions are usually ordered by points allocated and the number of answers needed (i.e., the first question is worth one point and requires one answer, the second question is worth two points and requires two answers, and the final question is worth three points and requires three answers). This is the first game in every episode. In special episodes the topic is the show's theme which has five questions of which the fourth and fifth questions have four and five answers respectively. The game is named after the song by The Saints.
- The Final Countdown: Teams partake in a general round of music trivia and must buzz in before the other team to answer a question. This is the only game in which points are deducted for incorrect responses. The final question of the round is sometimes a joke question (such as having to name the members of Crosby, Stills, Nash & Young). This is the final game of each episode and is named after the song by Europe.
- Substitute: One member from each team sings three well-known tunes, substituting words from a text provided by Hills. This is usually a technical manual or some kind of text that is humorous given the context (texts used have included Datsun 180B Service Manual, 2004 Australian Government Tax Pack, A Guide to Yabbie Farming and Be Bold with Bananas). The other members of that team then guess the songs. This game is loosely based on One Song to the Tune of Another from the BBC Radio 4 panel game I'm Sorry I Haven't a Clue and Adam Hills's own minor hit with "Working Class Anthem", in which he sang the lyrics of the Australian National Anthem to the tune of Jimmy Barnes's "Working Class Man". The game is named after the song by the Who.
  - A variation of this game is Dancing Substitute, in which one member from each team is chosen to perform well-known dance moves for the other members to name.
- Cover Versions: One team member is chosen to draw pictures (in silence), in initial episodes representing album covers and in later episodes representing song titles. The other team members attempt to name the album/song. The drawings are not allowed to contain words or numbers. Axel F is played in the background during this game.
- Samplemania/Videomania: Several songs or music video clips are edited into one 30-second clip. Players must identify the different songs/videos in the clip after they have all been played, and are not allowed to take notes.
- Turning Japanese: The lyrics of well-known song are translated into Japanese using an online web translator and then translated back into English using the same translator. Contestants must name the title of the original song. The game is named after the song by the Vapors.
- Please Please Tell Me Now: The teams must answer detailed questions about an excerpt of a music video clip after watching it. The game is named after a line in "Is There Something I Should Know?" by Duran Duran.
- Musician or Serial Killer: Each team is shown photographs and is asked whether that person shown is a musician or a serial killer. Early episodes tasked individual panelists with a question each, which was replaced by opening the questions to the whole team. The game has also used different groups in some episodes, such as showing pictures of either ARIA Award winners or audience members.
- Sir Mix'n'Matchalot: Each team has to match three famous people with three obscure facts about them. The game is named after rapper Sir Mix-a-Lot.
- Bottom 100: Each team is given two popular but generally divisive songs (for example, Macarena or MMMBop) and is asked which was rated worse in a certain list. The title of this game is a play on the Triple J Hottest 100.
- You Can Buy Me Love (retitled Can Buy Me Love in the 2021 reboot): Three celebrity-themed items found on eBay (e.g., a tour jacket, keychain with artist/band name) are presented and teams are asked to place each item in order from cheapest to the most expensive. The game is named after the song "Can’t Buy Me Love" by the Beatles.
- Common People: Teams must identify the commonality between three musicians, musical personalities, songs or albums. The game is named after the song by Pulp.
- Malvern Stars on 45: One team member rides a bicycle that powers a record player, with the rotation speed of each record governed by the team member's pedalling speed. The other team members must name as many songs as possible in the time limit. The game is a portmanteau of the bicycle manufacturer Malvern Star and the band Stars on 45.
- Mondegreens: Teams are given a short piece of text that sounds similar to a set of lyrics. Teams must then identify the real lyrics.
- Looking for Clues, in which teams have to name a band from a cryptic clue given by Hills. The game is named after the song by Robert Palmer.
- Look What They've Done... (occasionally called Name That Tune): Teams must identify songs from clips that have been changed in some way. The most common method has been having a guest artist use unconventional methods or styles. Other iterations played the song backwards (which later became its own game, Step Back In Time), through headphones on maximum volume, as a ringtone, over the top of another song, or on a malfunctioning radio. The game is named after the song What Have They Done to My Song Ma by Melanie Safka.
- Something's Missing: Teams are shown album covers with an item or word blanked out, and must identify the missing item. The game is named after the song by Paul Jabara and Donna Summer.
- One Out Of Three Ain't Bad: Teams are given an obscure musical story and are presented with three possible endings. Teams must select the true ending to the story. The game is named after the song "Two Out of Three Ain't Bad" by Meat Loaf.
- Word Up: Teams must identify the lyrics of a song from five random words. The game is named after the song by Cameo.
- You're The Voices: A member of each team must stand next to the opposite team and sing a song's tune (replacing all lyrics with la la la). The first team to get its member's song correct wins a point. The game is named after the song by John Farnham.
- All Shook Up: Teams must unscramble anagrams of musicians' names (e.g. "Bomb Early" – "Bob Marley"). The game is named after the song by Elvis Presley.
- Two Little Words: One member of each team is blind-folded while a screen shows their teammates names of musical artists. The blind-folded member must name the musician or band from one word given by the other two team members. The game is named after the song "Three Little Words" by The Rhythm Boys. Green Onions is played in the background during this game.
- Counting the Beat: One team member attempts to play songs on a keyboard; they are given a list of notes to play in order, but no indication of the rhythm. The other team members try to name the song. In the 2021 reboot, the game is played on a giant keyboard played with feet. The game is named after the song by the Swingers.
- I'll Jumble For Ya: One team member is given thirty seconds to match nine song titles that have been split in half and mixed up. The game is named after the song "I'll Tumble 4 Ya" by Culture Club. For the 2024 series onwards, the game was reduced to eight song titles.
- What's The Story?: Each team receives three stories about an opposing team member. Team members must decide whether each story is either true, half true, or untrue. The game is named after the Oasis album (What's the Story) Morning Glory?.
- Turn Turn Turn, in which each team is presented with a sliding block puzzle of a famous album cover, and members have to work together to solve it. The blocks are double sided, with the main cover on one side, and several decoy covers on the other. Both teams battle it out, and points are given to the team completing its puzzle first. The game is named after the song written by Pete Seeger and made famous by the Byrds.
- Reelin' in the Years: Each team must match ten songs to the year of its first performance. The game is named after the song by Steely Dan.
- F.A.C.T. In The U.S.A.: Teams are given musical facts based on towns they select on a map of the United States and must determine whether it is true or false. The game is named after the song R.O.C.K. in the U.S.A. by John Mellencamp
- Toss the Telly: One member from each team tries to throw TVs out of a pretend hotel window. Points are scored based on how many TVs are successfully thrown.
- Spickety Blanks,: Each team is presented with a quotation from a famous musician in which one of the words is blanked out. Team members must give the missing word. This game is a play on the show Blankety Blanks.
- Disco v Punk: Each team has to knock over punks (bowling pins) with a disco ball (bowling ball). Points are scored based on how many punks a team is able to knock down.
- Apprentices Masters: Teams must guess album covers that are painted in the style of European masters.
- Sixties Jumble: Teams are given a set of songs and events and must match them to the year were released or in which they occurred.
- Across the Ditch, Bro: Each team is presented with a list of songs from either Australia or New Zealand and must match the songs to their country of origin.
- Mistletoss: Teams 'deliver' Christmas presents by throwing them into a goal within a given time limit. Points are scored based on how many presents a team successfully delivers. Different variations of this game exist, such as the teams throwing fruit at singers who are keeping baby Jesus awake at the inn, throwing CDs into the chimney of a model house, presents into windows of a rehab clinic or simply into pairs of stockings.
- Who? Who? Who?: Teams must identify a music-industry personality dressed in a Christmas outfit.

Some games have proven considerably more popular than others. Outside of Know Your Product and The Final Coutdown, Substitute was featured most often, appearing in almost every episode early in the show's run. Most other games were used sporadically and some in only one episode.

=== Introduced in 2021 ===
- Cover Cover Cover Cover Chameleon, in which each team is presented with a person dressed up like someone from a famous album cover, who then reveals a recreation of it using real life objects and a soundstage. The team must identify what album the person is trying to recreate. The game is named after "Karma Chameleon" by Culture Club.
- Art For Art's Sake, in which the teams are presented with crudely drawn fan art of famous musicians and must identify the person portrayed. The game is named after the song "Art for Art's Sake" by 10cc.
- Am I Ever Gonna See Your Face Again?, where each team is presented with a mysterious musician through a Skype call (with the musician's face and voice replaced), whose identity is revealed after ten "yes or no" questions are asked. The game is named after the song "Am I Ever Gonna See Your Face Again" by The Angels. The game itself is based on "Who am I?" games.
- Never Tell Us Apart, in which the teams are presented with clips of two songs with rhyming names (e.g., "Fast Car" / "All Star") played at the same time, and teams must identify each song. The game is named after "Never Tear Us Apart" by INXS.
- Papa's Left His Brand New Bag, in which each team is presented with an item of baggage left at the airport by famous musicians, and must guess the musician by looking through its contents. Every member is given some unique item, resulting in six rounds of the game. The game is named after "Papa's Got a Brand New Bag" by James Brown.
- On My List, in which each team is presented a question with multiple possible answers, and the team must write the correct answer.
- Picture This, in which each team is provided a set of "cryptic" images that refer to a song title, and must identify the song title from the images. The game is named after the song "Picture This" by Blondie.
- Tuberstylin', in which each team must guess a song based on YouTube comments left on its music video. If a team member does not guess it within a single comment, another comment providing a clearer hint is given. The game is named after "Superstylin'" by Groove Armada.
- Fa-Fa-Fa-Fa-Fashion, in which each team is presented with six images of a famous musician from different career stages and must sort them from oldest to newest. A song by the artist will play in the background while they sort. The game is named after "Fashion" by David Bowie. in the 2024 series, the game was changed to have five images
- Adam and The Antonyms, in which each team must give a song's title from its opposite (e.g., "Wintertime Happiness" / "Summertime Sadness"). The game's name is a play on the name of the English rock band Adam and the Ants.
- Listomania, in which each team is presented with a list of an artist's top five favourite songs, and must predict the correct order using a magnetic board. Then a pre-recorded video of the artist explaining the correct order is played. The game's name is a pun on the fan frenzy known as Lisztomania and the 2009 song of that name by the French band Phoenix.

=== Introduced in 2022 ===
- Secret Song: in which clues to a song are hidden throughout each episode, and teams must identify the song, which is asked as the final question in The Final Countdown. Teams that are correct are awarded five points, and a cover of the song is performed over the closing credits. This game was only played for two seasons before being dropped from 2025 onwards.
- Stand & Delivery, in which each team must identify a musician from that person's home deliveries. Similar to Papa's Left His Brand New Bag, but teams are given only a single container. The game is named after "Stand and Deliver" by Adam and the Ants.
- In Da Club, in which all team members must stand in a faux nightclub queue and ask the manager clues about what act is performing. The game is named after the song "In da Club" by 50 Cent.
- The Kids Are Alright, in which teams are shown clips of kids describing music videos, and have to guess which song they are talking about. The game is named after the song "The Kids Are Alright" by the Who.
- Another Brick in the Wall, in which teams have to guess iconic outfits worn by various musicians. Each outfit is modeled behind a giant wall, with bricks able to be taken out to reveal a part of the outfit. Points decrease as bricks are removed. The game is named after the song "Another Brick in the Wall" by Pink Floyd.

=== Introduced in 2024 ===
- Counting the Bells, in which teams (along with Hills) play orchestral handbells whilst trying to name the song they are playing. Teams are given a sheet indicating the notes of the bells and which hand each bell is in, but no indication of rhythm. This is a variation on the game Counting the Beat.
- Seven Donation Army, in which teams have to identify a musician based on various pre-loved items (eg. Eminem being identified by a toy rabbit, a name tag, and a sweater stained with vomit and "Mom's spaghetti.") The game is named after "Seven Nation Army" by the White Stripes.
- Idiom Killed the Radio Star, in which teams have to guess if various idioms have musical origins. Each team is presented with an idiom, and must decide if the given origins are true or false. The game is named after "Video Killed the Radio Star" recorded by Bruce Woolley and the Camera Club, and the Buggles.

=== Introduced in 2025 (20th anniversary season) ===
- It's the End of the Line As We Know it, in which teams have to guess songs based on lyrics, however only the last word of each line is given (eg. 'woman,' 'street,' 'woman,' 'meet,' being "Oh Pretty Woman" by Roy Orbison.) The game is named after "It's the End of the World as We Know It (And I Feel Fine)" by R.E.M.
- I'll Be Missing Woo! in which teams are given song lyrics, and have to identify what nonsense word or sound (ie. la, ah, zig-a-zig, woop) is missing, with Hills punctuating each blanked out phrase with various squeaky toys and noisemakers. The game is named after "I'll Be Missing You" by Sean Combs.
- Blah Blah & The Blah Blahs, in which teams are given the second part of a band name, and must name the first half (eg. 'The Mechanics' being 'Mike')
- Musical Chers, in which teams compete in a group game of musical chairs. A well-known song is performed in a children's music style, with players attempting to name the song, sitting on a 'Cher chair' once they know the answer. The last person standing is eliminated. However, if someone gets the answer wrong, they are eliminated, with the player who initially failed to sit being reinstated. The game continues until there is one player left, earning one point for their team. The game has nothing to do with the singer Cher, only featuring chairs decorated with the singer's face.
- What's the Story, Morning Glory, in which teams are read children's stories based on the lyrics of songs, and have to guess what song the stories are based on. The game is named after Oasis' 1995 album of the same name.
- Plant Music, In which teams must guess if given names are bands, or a story from the ABC TV show Gardening Australia.
- A Honker Honker Burning Love, in which team captains play tuned bulb horns, whilst their teams tries to name the song they are playing. Captains are given a sheet indicating the notes of the horns, but no indication of rhythm. This is a variation on the game Counting the Beat.
- Frank Piñata, in which all team members are asked questions relating to famous musical Franks. Each correct answer is awarded one point, and a chance to 'spank Frank' (hit a piñata in the shape of Frank Sinatra) with a fake hand attached to a stick. The person who successfully 'finishes Frank off' is awarded three points for their team.
- Instrumental as Anything, in which teams are given a word, and have to decide if it is a musical instrument or not. The game's name is a riff on Australian band Mental as Anything.
- Will A.I. am Shakespeare, in which song lyrics have been rewritten by A.I. in the style of Shakespearean sonnets. Each sonnet is performed by two actors, and teams must guess the original song.

From this season onwards, Secret Song was dropped as a game.

=== Introduced in 2026 ===
- Like a Rolling Stone...Review, in which teams are shown clippings from reviews for hit songs, and have to identify what song the reviews are for. The game is named after "Like A Rolling Stone" by Bob Dylan, and also a riff on Rolling Stone magazine.
- Spikety Spanks, in which teams are shown quotes from famous musicians in which one of the words has been replaced by the word 'spank.' Teams must correctly identify the missing word.
- Do-Re-Mi-Mories, in which one member from each team battles it out in a game of Concentration, trying to match words in order to create song titles. The game's name is a riff on the first three notes of the solfege scale.
- Baa, Baa, Barnaby, in which teams are given quotes, and must identify if they are a line from a country music song, or a quote from Australian politician Barnaby Joyce. The game is named after the nursery rhyme Baa, Baa, Blacksheep.
- Jenny From the Blocks, in which one member from each team must place blocks with musical events on them next to the year they occurred. If any mistakes are made at time up, teams are optionally given an additional 30 seconds to try and correct their mistakes. The game is named after Jenny From the Block by Jennifer Lopez.
- Filibusta Rhymes, in which teams, posing as news journalists, are read song lyrics which have been rewritten in the style of political speeches, and must guess the song the speeches are based on. The game is named after American rapper, Busta Rhymes.
- I Saw the Signs, in which teams are given pictograms relating to the lyrics of a song, and must guess what the song is. The game is named after I Saw The Sign by Ace of Base.
- Hands on Buzzards, in which teams, posing as birdwatchers, are shown pictures of birds, and must identify which band/artist is being represented (ie. a picture of a hawk wearing high heels, lipstick, and a pearl necklace being Ladyhawke.)
- Ungrateful Dead, in which teams must match quotes to various deceased musicians. The game's name is a riff on band Grateful Dead.

== Production ==
Spicks and Specks was first filmed in Gordon Street, Elsternwick, at Studio 31, before being moved to ABC Melbourne's new studios in Southbank.

== Episodes ==
Series	Episodes		Originally released	
Series	Episodes		First released	Last released
1	42		2 February 2005	18 December 2005
2	42		15 February 2006	17 December 2006
3	42		14 February 2007	16 December 2007
4	43		6 February 2008	21 December 2008
5	43		4 February 2009	20 December 2009
6	37		3 February 2010	24 December 2010
7	28		4 May 2011	23 November 2011
8	26		5 February 2014	19 December 2014
Specials	5		4 November 2018	20 December 2020
9	10		18 April 2021	20 June 2021
10	10		7 August 2022	16 October 2022
11	14	8	9 June 2024	28 July 2024
11	14	6	20 October 2024	24 November 2024
12	14	6	15 June 2025	20 July 2025
12	14	8	2 November 2025	21 December 2025

== Specials ==
=== A Very Specky Christmas ===
Since 2005, an annual hour-long Christmas episode, entitled "A Very Specky Christmas" on the Sunday night before Christmas (though more recent seasons do not include a Christmas special.) All questions are either about Christmas songs, or music from the previous year. While these episodes remain true to the standard format with three members on each team, adaptions are made to allow more guest stars to appear. Additional or notably different games have included:

- Mistletoss, a physical challenge in which the teams are required to throw Christmas presents into a goal in a given time limit. In 2005, the teams threw CDs into the chimney of a model house; in 2006, wrapped gifts were thrown into celebrities' Christmas stockings of different sizes; in 2007, wrapped gifts were thrown through the windows of a "rehab clinic" with a guard out the front, Frank Woodley.
- Sir Mix'n'Matchalot is adapted so that three additional celebrities appear and are arbitrarily given Christmas presents by the show. The panel then asks questions and attempts to allocate the presents.
- Substitute is adapted so that trained choirs sing the tunes of Christmas songs with the words from famous quotes and works from the past year, such as controversial pieces of legislation, political speeches, or pop culture.

=== Best Of ===
As the last episode of each year of the original series, Spicks and Specks reflects on the highlights, lowlights and guests from throughout the year.

=== 100th episode ===
On 30 May 2007, Spicks and Specks celebrated its 100th episode. Instead of the show being divided into games, teams were asked 100 questions – one from each of the previous 99 episodes, and one new question, "What is the last question on our 100th episode?" which was correctly answered by Antoinette Halloran. Alan Brough's team was victorious although it did come down to the very last question.

=== Behind the scenes ===
This was the first episode of Spicks and Specks in which the games are not played at all. Instead, this behind-the-scenes special hosted by regular contestant Hamish Blake took a tour through the studios and dressing rooms of the ABC studios in Elsternwick and conducted interviews with show personnel.

=== Production studio ===
The show was filmed at ABC Studios in Elsternwick, Victoria, which were rented by ABV-2.

With ABC Studios in Ripponlea getting ready to shut down, the program's new home is now at ABC Melbourne studios in Southbank, Victoria. With the move from Ripponlea also comes a move from the ABC as the broadcast provider. It is recorded in front of a live audience of 500 people.

=== 200th episode ===
On 9 September 2009, Spicks and Specks celebrated its 200th episode. The show had a number of members from the Melbourne Symphony Orchestra behind the hosts, who performed the show's many musical questions including the theme song Spicks and Specks by the Bee Gees. The episode also included returning guests Ella Hooper, Hamish Blake, Paul Grabowsky and Meshel Laurie. The questions covered 200 years of music from 1809 to 2009.

=== Final episode of original series ===
A one-hour special, called "The Finale", was the final episode of the original series of Spicks and Specks and went to air on 23 November 2011. There was a change to the list of guests: various guests rotated during different rounds of the show. All of the credited guest appearances on the show were Ella Hooper, Geoffrey Rush, Scott Edgar, Dave O'Neil, Rhonda Burchmore, Adam Richard, Darren Hayes, Brian Cadd, Brian Mannix, Felicity Ward, Amanda Keller, Jimeoin, Tommy Dean, Shane Bourne, Dan Sultan, Richard Gill, Antoinette Halloran, Denise Scott, Peter Helliar, Barry Morgan, Megan Washington, Damian Callinan, Hamish Blake and Andy Lee (who were in New York at the time of filming for their Hamish and Andy's Gap Year).

=== Other specials ===
Special episodes have been compiled for various seasonal or arbitrary themes, including:

- Halloween (dubbed Spicks and Spooks)
- ARIA Hall of Fame inductees
- Children's music
- Music from films (dubbed Spicks and Flicks)
- Mother's Day
- Australia vs New Zealand
- 50s
- 60s
- 70s
- 80s
- Countdown Special
- Britannia Special
- Australiana Special
- Americana Special
- Europa Special
- Comedy Special
- AusMusic Special
- 1990s Special
- 2000s Special
- 2010s Special

In each case, questions are written, and some games are changed slightly or new games invented, to suit the theme.

=== 2018 one-off reunion special ===
On 27 August 2018, it was announced that the show would return for a one-off hour-long special as part of the ABC's "Ausmusic" month. Confirmed as panellists were award-winning rapper Adam Briggs, singer/songwriter Ricki-Lee Coulter and comedians Frank Woodley and Denise Scott, plus a line-up of famous guests to lend their musical talents and knowledge.

The one-hour special aired on 4 November, with a repeat airing on ABC Comedy on 10 November. Guests included Adalita, Vika and Linda Bull, Troy Cassar-Daley, Kate Ceberano, Murray Cook, Paul Dempsey, Antoinette Halloran, Guido Hatzis, Kram, Angie Hart, Kate Miller-Heidke, Lindsay McDougall, Luke McGregor, Russell Morris, Montaigne, Pseudo Echo, Josh Pyke, Ruel, Eskimo Joe's Kav Temperley, Tripod, Cal Wilson, Ross Wilson. The show was dedicated to long time regular guest Richard Gill, who had died a week before the special went to air. It ranked #1 nationally with 1.36 million viewers.

=== 2019–2020 specials ===
In August 2019, it was announced that the show with the original lineup would return for a one-off special in November 2019, followed by a short three-episode reboot airing in 2020. The episodes featured original host Adam Hills and team captains Alan Brough and Myf Warhurst, with each episode focusing on a specific generation of music.

Four specials were broadcast; the Ausmusic special, the 90s special, the 2000s special and the 2010s special. Because music from the 2010s was not included in the original Spicks and Specks show, Adam Hills said it was his favourite to film.

== DVD releases ==
- In 2007, the first Spicks and Specks product was launched, the Spicks and Specks Interactive Quiz DVD.
- A Very Specky Christmas was released on 4 December 2008; it contains the 2007 and 2006 Christmas Specials.
- In 2009, the DVD Up to our Eras was released. It contained the 50s special, the 60s special, the 70s special and the 80s special.
- Spicks and Specks: The Remixes was released on 5 August 2010 containing 4 episodes that were uncut and uncensored.
- Spicks & Specks: World Tour was released on 4 November 2010, containing the Australiana, Britannia, Americana and Europa specials, and is said to have unseen footage.
- Spick & Specks: The Finale was released on 1 December 2011, containing the final episode and The Best of Spicks & Specks.
- Spicks & Specks: The Pick of Spicks was released on 5 April 2012, containing extended versions of four classic episodes chosen by the hosts.
- The Spicks and Specks Boxset was released on 1 April 2015, the 4-DVD set contains: The Remixes, World Tour, The Finale and the Pick of Spicks.

== Awards ==
Year	Awards	Award title	Result
2025	AACTA Awards	Best Entertainment Program	Won
2022	AACTA Awards	Best Comedy Program	Nominated
2012	Logie Awards	Logie Most Outstanding Light Entertainment Program	Won
2012	Logie Awards	Logie Most Popular Light Entertainment Program	Nominated
2012	Logie Awards	Silver Logie Most Popular Presenter Adam Hills	Won
2011	Logie Awards	Logie Most Outstanding Light Entertainment Program	Won
2011	Logie Awards	Silver Logie Most Popular Presenter Adam Hills	Nominated
2010	Logie Awards	Logie Most Popular Light Entertainment Program	Nominated
2010	Logie Awards	Silver Logie Most Popular Presenter Adam Hills	Nominated
2009	Logie Awards	Logie Most Popular Light Entertainment Program	Nominated
2009	Logie Awards	Silver Logie Most Popular Presenter Adam Hills	Nominated
2008	Logie Awards	Logie Most Popular Light Entertainment Program	Nominated
2008	Logie Awards	Silver Logie Most Popular Presenter Adam Hills	Nominated
2007	Logie Awards	Logie Most Outstanding Comedy Program	Nominated
2007	AACTA Awards	Best Light Entertainment Television Series	Nominated
2006	Logie Awards	Graham Kennedy Award for Most Outstanding New Talent Adam Hills	Nominated
2006	AACTA Awards	Best Light Entertainment Television Series	Nominated
2006	Logie Awards	Logie Most Popular Light Entertainment/Comedy Program	Nominated
2005	AACTA Awards	Best Light Entertainment Series	Nominated

== Related games ==
In 2008, the Spicks and Specks Board Game was released by Imagination Games. It was followed by "Up To Our Eras" in 2010, and an "Ausmusic Edition" in 2019.

In 2011, Spicks and Specks Quiz, an app for iPhones, was released. Users are given two play options, Quick Play or Quiz Challenge, with various games taken from the show. There are a number of top-up Quiz Packs to extend the game. On its initial release, the name of the app was automatically censored by Apple to 'S****s and Specks' because of the derogatory use of the word 'spick' in the US to describe a person of Hispanic heritage.

== See also ==
- Never Mind the Buzzcocks, a similar BBC 2/Sky Max music quiz show
- RockWiz, a similar SBS/Fox8 music quiz show.
