= Spiderbait discography =

- Studio albums: 7
- Extended plays: 3
- Live albums: 1
- Compilation albums: 3
- Singles: 24
- Music videos: 29

The discography of Australian rock band Spiderbait consists of seven studio albums, three compilations, two EPs, and twenty-four singles.

== Studio albums ==
List of studio albums, with selected chart positions and certifications
Title	Album details	Peak chart positions	Certifications
Title	Album details	AUS	Certifications
ShashavaGlava	Released: 30 January 1993; Label: Au Go Go (ANDA 147CD); Formats: CD	170	
The Unfinished Spanish Galleon of Finley Lake	Released: 25 September 1995; Label: Polydor (529155-2); Formats: CD, cassette	14	
Ivy and the Big Apples	Released: 14 October 1996; Label: Polydor (533674-2); Formats: CD, cassette, vinyl	3	ARIA: 2× Platinum
Grand Slam	Released: 12 April 1999; Label: Grudge, Polydor (547349-2); Formats: CD, vinyl	3	ARIA: Gold
The Flight of Wally Funk	Released: 1 October 2001; Label: Universal Music (014912-2); Formats: CD	34	
Tonight Alright	Released: 28 March 2004; Label: Universal Music (9817558); Formats: CD, cassette, vinyl	14	ARIA: Platinum
Spiderbait	Released: 15 November 2013; Label: Mercury (3757789); Formats: CD, digital download, vinyl	30	

== Live albums ==
List of live albums, with selected details
Title	Album details
Live in Canada and Australia!!	Released: 1997; Label: Polydor; Formats: CD

== Compilations ==
List of compilation albums, with selected chart positions and certifications
Title	Album details	Peak chart positions	Certifications
Title	Album details	AUS	Certifications
Greatest Hits	Released: 12 September 2005; Label: Universal Music (9873332); Formats: CD, LP	5	ARIA: Gold
B-Sides Collection	Released: 16 February 2017; Label: Universal Music; Formats: Digital download, streaming	—	
Sounds in the Key of J	Released: 8 April 2022; Label: Universal Music; Formats: Digital download, streaming, LP	90	

== EPs ==
List of EPs, with selected details
Title	EP details	Peak chart positions
Title	EP details	AUS
P'tang Yang Kipper Bang, Uh!	Released: 16 December 1991; Label: Au Go Go (ANDA 139); Formats: 10" EP	—
Run	Released: 8 November 1993; Label: Au Go Go (165CD); Formats: CD	170
Bunch of Bettys	Released: 20 September 2024; Label: Universal; Formats: Digital	—

== Singles ==
List of singles, with selected chart positions and certifications
Title	Year	Peak chart positions	Certifications	Album
Title	Year	AUS	Certifications	Album
"Circle K" / "Constipation" (7" single)	1991	—		Non-album single
"Jesus" (7" single)	1994	—		The Unfinished Spanish Galleon of Finley Lake
"Monty"	1995	44		The Unfinished Spanish Galleon of Finley Lake
"I Gotta Know"	1995	83		The Unfinished Spanish Galleon of Finley Lake
"Sam Gribbles"	1996	72		The Unfinished Spanish Galleon of Finley Lake
"Buy Me a Pony"	1996	45		Ivy and the Big Apples
"Hot Water & Milk"	1996	78		Ivy and the Big Apples
"Calypso"	1997	13		Ivy and the Big Apples
"Joyce's Hut" / "Horschack Army"	1997	98		Ivy and the Big Apples
"Shazam!"	1999	46		Grand Slam
"Stevie"	1999	81		Grand Slam
"Plastic"	1999	84		Grand Slam
"Glockenpop"	2000	80		Grand Slam
"Four on the Floor"	2001	91		The Flight of Wally Funk
"Outta My Head"	2001	89		The Flight of Wally Funk
"Arse Huggin' Pants" / "Bo Bo"	2002	125		The Flight of Wally Funk
"Black Betty"	2004	1	ARIA: 2× Platinum	Tonight Alright
"Fucken Awesome"	2004	30		Tonight Alright
"Straight Through the Sun"	2013	—		Spiderbait
"It's Beautiful"	2013	131		Spiderbait
"My Car's a UFO"	2022	—		Sounds in the Key of J

=== Promotional singles ===
Title	Year	Album
"Tonite"	2004	Tonight Alright
"Live in a Box"	2004	Tonight Alright
"On My Way"	2005	Greatest Hits

== Other appearances ==
- "Shazam!" featured in an episode of season four of Sex and the City
- "(Ghost) Riders in the Sky" featured in the end credits of Ghost Rider
- "Glockenpop" featured in the PSP version of the game LittleBigPlanet, in 2009
- "Rock-a-Bye Your Bear" on ReWiggled – A Tribute to the Wiggles (2011)
