= Greatest Hits (Spiderbait album) =

Greatest hits album by Spiderbait
- Released: 12 September 2005
- Recorded: 1990–2005
- Genre: Alternative rock, hard rock
- Length: 62:45
- Label: Universal
- Producer: Andy Baldwin

Spiderbait chronology
Tonight Alright (2004)	Greatest Hits (2005)	Spiderbait (2013)

Professional ratings
Review scores
Source	Rating
Buttonhole	(9.9/10)

Greatest Hits is a greatest hits album by Australian rock band Spiderbait. The band decided to put out the compilation after discovering newer fans had not been aware of Spiderbait before their cover of Lead Belly's "Black Betty". "We'd talk to these excited kids who didn't know our previous albums," recalls Kram. "It was like Tonight Alright was our debut album in some ways".

The sequencing of Greatest Hits was done in reverse order, with the new song "On My Way" at the start and "Circle K" from 1991 at the end. The album was released as a single-disc edition and also as a two-disc version. The second disc was a DVD with all of Spiderbait's music videos up to that point (except "On My Way").

== Track listing ==
All tracks are written by Spiderbait except Black Betty by Huddie Ledbetter and Run by Bill Oddie.

No.	Title	Original release	Length
1.	"On My Way"		3:23
2.	"Black Betty"	Tonight Alright, 2004	3:28
3.	"Fucken Awesome"	Tonight Alright	2:25
4.	"Tonite"	Tonight Alright	4:22
5.	"Four on the Floor"	The Flight of Wally Funk, 2001	3:09
6.	"Outta My Head"	The Flight of Wally Funk	2:34
7.	"Shazam!"	Grand Slam, 1999	2:07
8.	"Glokenpop"	Grand Slam	3:20
9.	"Stevie"	Grand Slam	3:00
10.	"Buy Me a Pony"	Ivy and the Big Apples, 1996	1:45
11.	"Calypso"	Ivy and the Big Apples	1:50
12.	"Hot Water & Milk"	Ivy and the Big Apples	1:57
13.	"Joyce's Hut"	Ivy and the Big Apples	3:41
14.	"Jesus"	The Unfinished Spanish Galleon of Finley Lake, 1995	1:51
15.	"Monty"	The Unfinished Spanish Galleon of Finley Lake	2:34
16.	"Sam Gribbles"	The Unfinished Spanish Galleon of Finley Lake	2:30
17.	"Yeah Oh Yeah"	The Unfinished Spanish Galleon of Finley Lake	1:10
18.	"Run"	ShashavaGlava, 1993	1:57
19.	"Old Man Sam"	P'tang Yang Kipper Bang, Uh!, 1991	2:40
20.	"Footy"	P'tang Yang Kipper Bang, Uh!	1:55
21.	"Scenester"	P'tang Yang Kipper Bang, Uh!	3:06
22.	"Circle K"	Circle K/Constipation, 1991	2:25
23.	"Constipation" (unlisted hidden track, starts 14 seconds after "Circle K")	Circle K/Constipation	5:36
Total length:			62:45

=== Bonus DVD ===
No.	Title	Length
1.	"Black Betty"	3:29
2.	"Fucken Awesome"	2:24
3.	"Put It Down"	2:43
4.	"Tonite"	3:50
5.	"Four on the Floor"	3:08
6.	"Outta My Head"	2:44
7.	"Dirty"	2:50
8.	"Bo Bo"	3:32
9.	"Arse Huggin' Pants"	5:07
10.	"Glokenpop"	3:13
11.	"Shazam!"	2:01
12.	"Stevie"	3:01
13.	"Plastic"	2:32
14.	"Calypso"	2:04
15.	"Buy Me a Pony"	1:41
16.	"Hot Water & Milk"	1:57
17.	"Joyce's Hut"	3:51
18.	"Chuck Picola"	1:09
19.	"Jesus"	2:00
20.	"Monty"	2:31
21.	"Spanish Galleon"	2:30
22.	"Yeah Oh Yeah"	1:15
23.	"I Gotta Know"	2:02
24.	"Sam Gribbles"	2:26
25.	"Run"	1:58
26.	"Old Man Sam"	2:42
Total length:		68:40

== Charts ==
=== Weekly charts ===
Chart (2005)	Peak position
Australian Albums (ARIA)	5

=== Year-end charts ===
Chart (2005)	Rank
Australian Albums Chart	100

== Certifications ==
Region	Certification	Certified units/sales
Australia (ARIA)	Gold	35,000^{^}
^{^} Shipments figures based on certification alone.

== Release history ==
Country	Release date	Format	Label	Catalogue
Australia	12 September 2005	CD+DVD	Universal	9873331
Australia	24 October 2005	CD	Universal	9873332
Australia	26 February 2016	Double LP	Universal	4771078
