= Shazam =

Shazam may refer to:

== Comic book franchise ==
=== Characters ===
- Shazam (DC Comics), aka Billy Batson and previously Captain Marvel, a superhero character published by Fawcett Comics and DC Comics.
- Captain Marvel Jr. aka Freddy Freeman and previously Shazam Jr., a superhero character published by Fawcett Comics and DC Comics.
- Wizard Shazam, a major supporting character and wizard who gives the aforementioned superhero both his namesake and superpowers.
- Mary Marvel, aka Mary Bromfield, a superhero character Fawcett Comics and DC Comics who used the name during the 2023 New Champion of Shazam series

=== Comics ===
- Shazam! The Monster Society of Evil, a 2007 limited-edition DC Comics series

=== Media ===
- Shazam! (TV series), 1974–1977 live-action television series based on the comic book franchise
- The Kid Super Power Hour with Shazam! a 1981 Saturday morning cartoon series segment based on the comic book franchise
- Shazam! (film), 2019 superhero film based on the comic book franchise
- Shazam! Fury of the Gods, 2023 superhero film and sequel to the 2019 film

=== Other ===
- Shazam!, a scrambler-style theme park ride based on DC's Shazam character, located at Six Flags St. Louis, Missouri, U.S.

== Other uses in arts and media ==
- "Shazam!" (Duane Eddy song), a 1960 song by Duane Eddy
- Shazam (album), a 1970 LP by The Move
- Shazam! (New Zealand TV series) a New Zealand youth music programme from the 1980s
- "Shazam!" (Spiderbait song), a song by Spiderbait from their 1999 album Grand Slam
- "Shazam!", a song by the Beastie Boys from their 2004 album To the 5 Boroughs
- "Shazam!", original title for Attack Attack!'s second album Attack Attack!
- "Shazam", a catch-phrase used by the character Gomer Pyle in The Andy Griffith Show and Gomer Pyle, U.S.M.C.

== Other uses ==
- Shazam (music app), a British music recognition app on Android and iPhone
- SHAZAM (interbank network), financial services and payments processing company
- Shazam (econometrics software), software package for econometrics and statistics

== See also ==
- Chazzan, a Jewish musician, or precentor, trained in the vocal arts
- Shazzan, an American animated series from 1967 to 1969, about a genie with magical powers
- Kazaam, a 1996 American comedy film about a genie with magical powers, played by Shaquille O'Neal
- Kazaa, a peer-to-peer file sharing application
- ShahZaM, the moniker for Shahzeb Khan, a professional Counter-Strike: Global Offensive player
- Cam Crabtree, an English darts player who is nicknamed “Shazam!”
