= Triple J's Hottest 100 of 1999 =

Most popular songs of the year in Australia

1999 Triple J Hottest 100
- Album artwork for the CD compilation

Countdown details
- Date of countdown: January 2000

Countdown highlights
- Winning song: Powderfinger "These Days"
- Most entries: Powderfinger; Silverchair (4 tracks)

Chronology
← Previous; 1998	Next → 2000

The 1999 Triple J Hottest 100, announced in January 2000, was the seventh such countdown of the most popular songs of the year, according to listeners of the Australian radio station Triple J. As in previous years, a CD featuring 36 (not necessarily the top 36) songs was released.

== Full list ==
Note: Australian artists

#	Song	Artist	Country of origin
1	These Days	Powderfinger	Australia
2	Weir	Killing Heidi	Australia
3	You Shit Me to Tears	The Tenants	Australia
4	Praise You	Fatboy Slim	United Kingdom
5	Every You Every Me	Placebo	United Kingdom
6	The Bad Touch	Bloodhound Gang	United States
7	Guerrilla Radio	Rage Against the Machine	United States
8	Nookie	Limp Bizkit	United States
9	Last Kiss	Pearl Jam	United States
10	Scar Tissue	Red Hot Chili Peppers	United States
11	Learn to Fly	Foo Fighters	United States
12	When I Grow Up	Garbage	United States
13	What's My Age Again?	Blink-182	United States
14	Mascara	Killing Heidi	Australia
15	Ana's Song (Open Fire)	Silverchair	Australia
16	Freak on a Leash	Korn	United States
17	Falling Away from Me	Korn	United States
18	Theophilus Thistler... An Exercise in Vowels	Sonic Animation	Australia
19	Animal	Jebediah	Australia
20	Exerciser	Rhubarb	Australia
21	Lucky Star	Alex Lloyd	Australia
22	Don't Call Me Baby	Madison Avenue	Australia
23	Right Here, Right Now	Fatboy Slim	United Kingdom
24	I Try	Macy Gray	United States
25	Already Gone	Powderfinger	Australia
26	Never Had So Much Fun	Frenzal Rhomb	Australia
27	Hey Boy Hey Girl	The Chemical Brothers	United Kingdom
28	Feet Touch the Ground	Jebediah	Australia
29	Anthem for the Year 2000	Silverchair	Australia
30	Miss You Love	Silverchair	Australia
31	All the Small Things	Blink-182	United States
32	Heaven Coming Down	The Tea Party	Canada
33	Ready 1	Grinspoon	Australia
34	You Are Not My Friend	Frenzal Rhomb	Australia
35	Bevan the Musical	Peter Helliar	Australia
36	A Hazy Shade of Winter	Bodyjar	Australia
37	Around the World	Red Hot Chili Peppers	United States
38	Chunky, Chunky Air Guitar	The Whitlams	Australia
39	Turn Up Your Stereo	Eskimo Joe	Australia
40	Shazam!	Spiderbait	Australia
41	All Torn Down	The Living End	Australia
42	Ringo (I Feel Like)	Custard	Australia
43	Emotion Sickness	Silverchair	Australia
44	Electricity	Something for Kate	Australia
45	Enter, Space Capsule	Gerling	Australia
46	The Chemicals Between Us	Bush	United Kingdom
47	Coffee & TV	Blur	United Kingdom
48	West End Riot	The Living End	Australia
49	Second Class Citizen	Area-7	Australia
50	Bigger Than Tina	The Fauves	Australia
51	Army	Ben Folds Five	United States
52	It Won't Last	The Cruel Sea	Australia
53	Sexx Laws	Beck	United States
54	Thank You (for Loving Me at My Worst)	The Whitlams	Australia
55	Perfect Family	Diana Ah Naid	Australia
56	No Leaf Clover	Metallica and the San Francisco Symphony	United States
57	Tender	Blur	United Kingdom
58	I Wanna Be a Nudist	Regurgitator	Australia
59	Mutha Fukka on a Motorcycle	Machine Gun Fellatio	Australia
60	Touched	VAST	United States
61	Asleep in Perfection	Augie March	Australia
62	Happiness (Rotting My Brain)	Regurgitator	Australia
63	Canned Heat	Jamiroquai	United Kingdom
64	We're Going Out Tonight	Frenzal Rhomb	Australia
65	Burn to Shine	Ben Harper & the Innocent Criminals	United States
66	Turn That Shit Up	Testeagles	Australia
67	Beautiful Stranger	Madonna	United States
68	Good-Day Ray	Powderfinger	Australia
69	Starfuckers, Inc.	Nine Inch Nails	United States
70	Whatever You Want	Something for Kate	Australia
71	Pulled Along by Love	The Mutton Birds	New Zealand
72	Hallways	Something for Kate	Australia
73	Pumping on Your Stereo	Supergrass	United Kingdom
74	Deeper Water	Deadstar	Australia
75	Some Kind of Love Song	Friendly	Australia
76	What It's Like	Everlast	United States
77	Sun Is Shining	Bob Marley vs. Funkstar De Luxe	Jamaica/Denmark
78	My Favourite Game	The Cardigans	Sweden
79	Bodyrock	Moby	United States
80	Sing It Back	Moloko	United Kingdom
81	Nothing Much Happens	Ben Lee	Australia
82	Home	Skunkhour	Australia
83	Hit Song	Custard	Australia
84	Stevie	Spiderbait	Australia
85	Steal My Kisses	Ben Harper & the Innocent Criminals	United States
86	Blue Monday	Orgy	United States
87	You Don't Care About Us	Placebo	United Kingdom
88	Run On	Moby	United States
89	Nice Guys Finish Last	Green Day	United States
90	Stripped	Rammstein	Germany
91	Down Under	Pennywise	United States
92	Sex-o-Matic Venus Freak	Macy Gray	United States
93	Waltz #2 (XO)	Elliott Smith	United States
94	Spray Water on the Stereo	Turnstyle	Australia
95	The Order of Death (Blair Witch Mix)	Public Image Ltd	United Kingdom
96	Plastic	Spiderbait	Australia
97	The Kids Aren't Alright	The Offspring	United States
98	Every Morning	Sugar Ray	United States
99	Ruby Wednesday	Eskimo Joe	Australia
100	Passenger	Powderfinger	Australia

== Statistics ==
=== Artists with multiple entries ===
#	Artist	Entries
4	Powderfinger	1, 25, 68, 100
4	Silverchair	15, 29, 30, 43
3	Frenzal Rhomb	26, 34, 64
3	Spiderbait	40, 84, 96
3	Something for Kate	44, 70, 72
2	Killing Heidi	2, 14
2	Fatboy Slim	4, 23
2	Placebo	5, 87
2	Red Hot Chili Peppers	10, 37
2	Blink-182	13, 31
2	KoЯn	16, 17
2	Jebediah	19, 28
2	Macy Gray	24, 92
2	The Whitlams	38, 54
2	Eskimo Joe	39, 99
2	The Living End	41, 48
2	Custard	42, 83
2	Blur	47, 57
2	Regurgitator	58, 62
2	Ben Harper	65, 85
2	Moby	79, 88

=== Countries Represented ===
Country	Total
Australia	52
United States	31
United Kingdom	12
Canada	1
New Zealand	1
Jamaica	1
Denmark	1
Sweden	1
Germany	1

=== Records ===
- The 1999 countdown marks the first time Australia was the most represented nation in the Hottest 100. A record of 52 songs were by Australian artists. This record was equaled in the 2007 countdown, and broken in 2014.
  - This is also the first Hottest 100 in which the top 3 songs were from Australian artists.
- "These Days" is the first B-side to win the Hottest 100, its 'a-side' "Passenger" came in at No 100; making Powderfinger the first artist to be voted into No. 1 and No. 100 positions of a Hottest 100.
- Killing Heidi and The Tenants are the first Unearthed artists to appear in the Top 10 of the Hottest 100, finishing second and third respectively. Killing Heidi's second place finish set the record for the highest ranking song by an Unearthed artist. This would later be equaled by Grinspoon (2002), Missy Higgins (2004), Art vs. Science (2009) and Little Red (2010), and was later broken by Vance Joy who won the 2013 countdown.
- There were eight songs in a row by Australian artists between positions #45 and #38. This is the longest run of Australian songs in a Hottest 100.
- Dave Grohl made his seventh consecutive appearance in the Hottest 100, having featured in every annual countdown to date.
  - Garbage, Janet English and Regurgitator all made their fifth consecutive appearance, having appeared since 1995.

== Top 10 Albums of 1999 ==
#	Artist	Album	Country of origin	Tracks in the Hottest 100
1	Alex Lloyd	Black the Sun	Australia	21
2	Red Hot Chili Peppers	Californication	United States	10, 37 (7 in 2000)
3	Something for Kate	Beautiful Sharks	Australia	44, 70, 72 (59 in 2000)
4	Silverchair	Neon Ballroom	Australia	15, 29, 30, 43 (96 in 2000)
5	Placebo	Without You I'm Nothing	United Kingdom	5, 87 (41 in 1998)
6	The Whitlams	Love This City	Australia	38, 54 (37 in 2000)
7	Nine Inch Nails	The Fragile	United States	69
8	Moby	Play	United States	79, 88 (22 in 2000)
9	Rage Against the Machine	The Battle of Los Angeles	United States	7 (13, 77 in 2000)
10	The Tea Party	Triptych	Canada	32

== CD release ==
Disc 1
1. Powderfinger – "These Days" (4:15)
2. Sonic Animation – "Theophilus Thistler" (3:56)
3. Blink-182 – "What's My Age Again?" (2:26)
4. Killing Heidi – "Weir" (3:38)
5. Rhubarb – "Exerciser" (1:40)
6. Beck – "Sexx Laws" (3:38)
7. Moloko – "Sing It Back" (4:39)
8. Placebo – "Every You Every Me" (3:33)
9. Diana ah Naid – "Perfect Family" (3:29)
10. Macy Gray – "Sex-o-matic Venus Freak" (3:57)
11. Supergrass – "Pumping on Your Stereo" (3:20)
12. Limp Bizkit – "Nookie" (4:27)
13. Regurgitator – "Happiness (Rotting My Brain)" (3:56)
14. Jamiroquai – "Canned Heat" (5:31)
15. The Whitlams – "Thank You (for Loving Me at My Worst)" (3:50)
16. The Tenants – "You Shit Me to Tears" (2:32)
17. Jebediah – "Animal" (4:29)
18. Rage Against the Machine – "Guerrilla Radio" (3:28)
Disc 2
1. deadstar – "Deeper Water" (4:23)
2. The Chemical Brothers – "Hey Boy Hey Girl" (4:49)
3. Moby – "Bodyrock" (3:36)
4. Foo Fighters – "Learn to Fly" (3:55)
5. Nine Inch Nails – "Starfuckers, Inc." (5:01)
6. Silverchair – "Ana's Song (Open Fire)" (3:40)
7. Grinspoon – "Ready 1" (2:35)
8. Bloodhound Gang – "The Bad Touch" (4:21)
9. Eskimo Joe – "Turn Up Your Stereo" (3:38)
10. Madison Avenue – "Don't Call Me Baby" (3:48)
11. Alex Lloyd – "Lucky Star" (4:00)
12. Fatboy Slim – "Praise You" (5:23)
13. Machine Gun Fellatio – "Mutha Fukka on a Motorcycle" (2:21)
14. Frenzal Rhomb – "Never Had So Much Fun" (2:00)
15. Something for Kate – "Electricity" (3:49)
16. Skunkhour – "Home" (3:18)
17. Testeagles – "Turn That Shit Up" (3:12)
18. Area-7 – "Second Class Citizen" (3:40)

=== Certifications ===
Region	Certification	Certified units/sales
Australia (ARIA)	3× Platinum	210,000^{^}
^{^} Shipments figures based on certification alone.

== See also ==
- 1999 in music
