= Kick in the Door =

Kick in the Door may refer to:

- "Kick in the Door", a song by the Notorious B.I.G. from Life After Death
- "Kick in the Door", a song by Skunkhour from The Go
