= B-Side Collection =

B-Side(s) Collection may refer to:

- The B-Side Collection, a 2007 album by Maroon 5
- B-Side Collection, a 1998 album by Harem Scarem
- B-Side Collection, a 2013 album by Jon B.
- B Side Collection, an album by Mariko Kouda
- B-Sides Collection, a 2017 album by Spiderbait

== See also ==
- List of B-side compilation albums
