= James "Iron Head" Baker and Moses "Clear Rock" Platt =

African American traditional folk singers

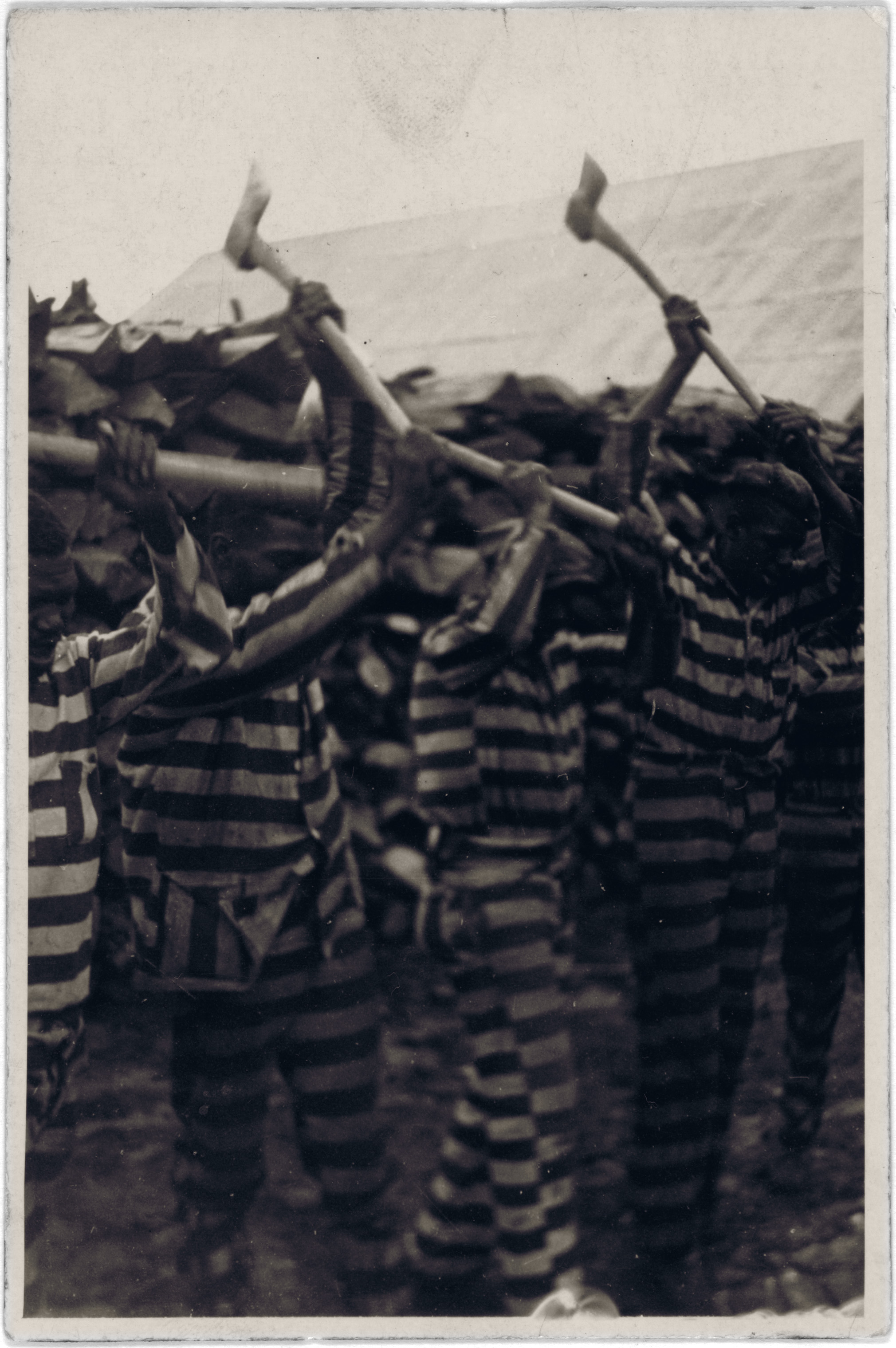
The field holler of an African American chain gang being recorded by Alan Lomax in 1934

James "Iron Head" Baker (March 18, 1884 – February 23, 1944) and Moses "Clear Rock" Platt (around 1867 – after 1939) were African American traditional folk singers imprisoned in the Central State Prison Farm in Sugar Land, Texas. The men made a number of field recordings of convict work songs, field hollers and other material with John Lomax for the Library of Congress Archive of American Folk Music in the 1930s.

After Lomax was refused entry to the Huntsville Penitentiary, in July 1933, the pair would become the first two convicts in Texas that Lomax was permitted to record. Both men performed solo, but responded to and encouraged one another. This gave Lomax an overview of the idiom and a number of songs to seek out in future collecting. Over the years a number of their recordings have been released on 78 rpm, on LP and on CD by the Library of Congress and other record labels.

== Singers ==
=== Iron Head ===
James "Iron Head" Baker
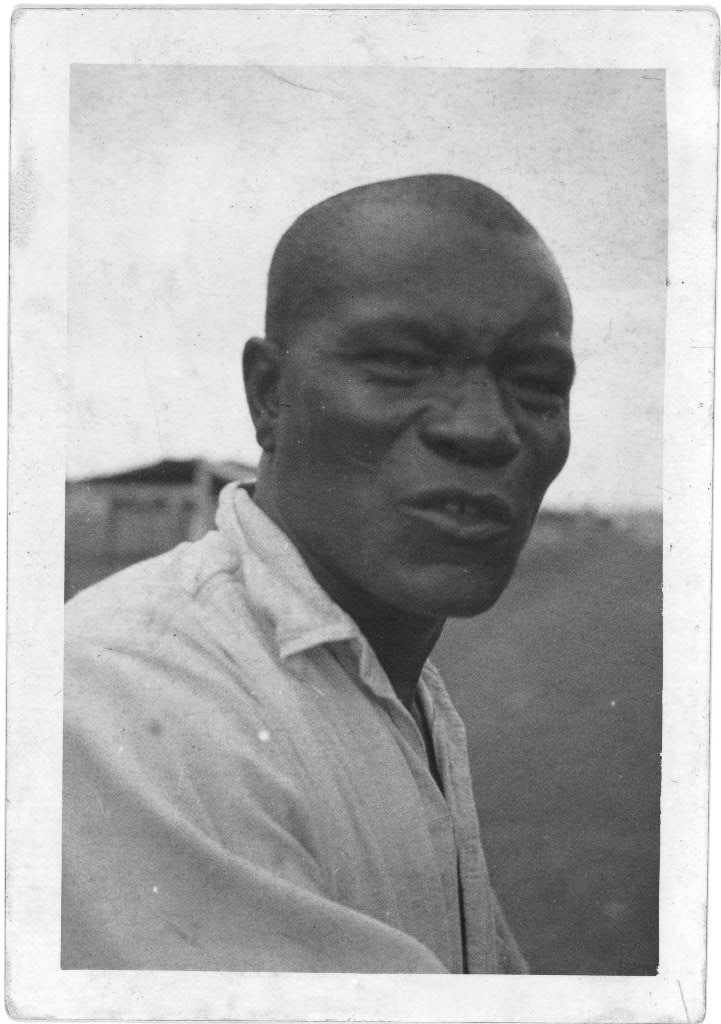

Background information
- Also known as: possible Reuben Avery Burrage
- Born: Tom Bakerley; March 18, 1884; Dallas, Texas, U.S.
- Died: February 23, 1944 (aged 59) Huntsville Penitentiary, Texas, U.S.
- Genres: Folk music Work song Field holler

James Baker was his prison name. He was generally referred to by his nickname Iron Head. His real name may have been Reuben Avery Burrage. When first recorded by the Lomaxes in July 1933 he was forty-nine years old and in his sixth term in the penitentiary. John Lomax, attempting to depict Iron Head's dialect, quotes him proudly claiming to be: "De roughest nigger what ever walked de streets of Dallas. In de pen off an' on fo' thirty fo' years. .. I'se a H.B.C. — habitual criminal, you know. Not even Ma Ferguson can pardon me" (a reference to the then Governor of Texas). In reality he was a minor criminal, guilty of nothing more violent than burglary, but sentenced to ninety-nine years as a repeat offender. Iron Head was a trusty with a measure of responsibility and control over other prisoners. He was initially reluctant to sing a sad song because it might make him want to run away and lose his "easy job".

=== Clear Rock ===
Moses "Clear Rock" Platt
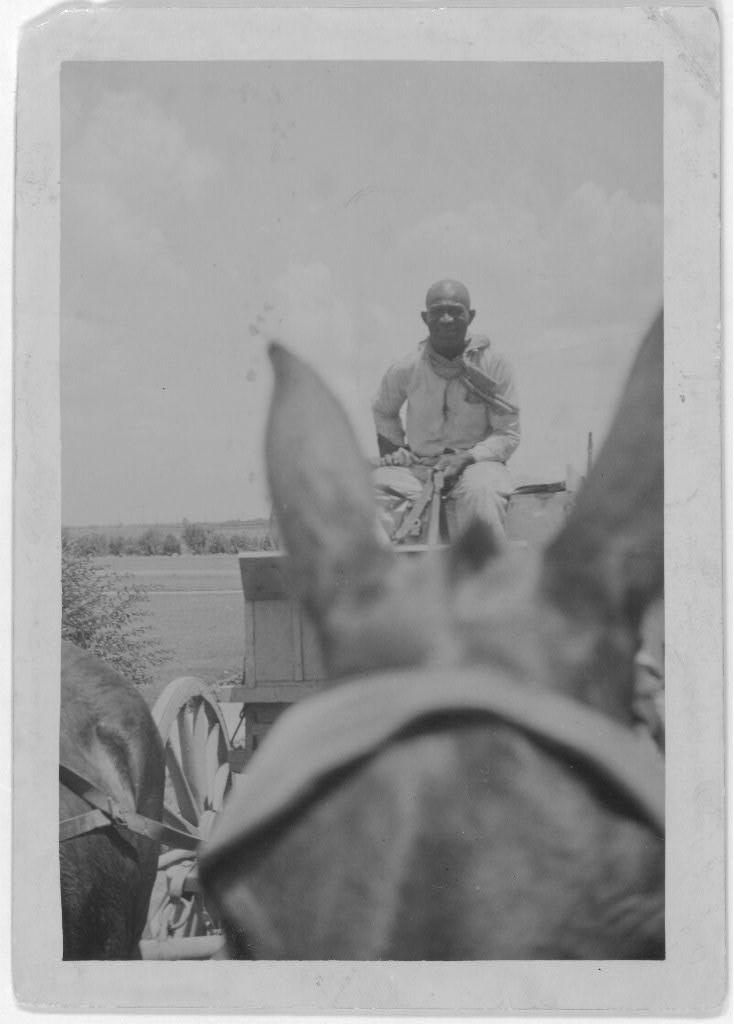

Background information
- Born: Unknown c. 1867
- Died: after 1939
- Genres: Folk music Work song Field holler

Moses Platt was his prison name. His real name, if different, is unknown. He was generally referred to by his nickname Clear Rock because of a link to a triple homicide. He told the Lomaxes he got the name because he killed three people by throwing rocks at them. For that he was given a life sentence but he "got pardoned out". But then he "took up with" a young woman he described as "a li'l yeller gal" ignorant, he claimed, that she was in fact only 14 years old. Denounced by enemies, he was recalled to serve his life sentence. When first recorded in 1933 he was 71 years old, having spent 47 years in the Texas prison system. Like Iron Head he proudly described himself as "a habitual". Clear Rock was later pardoned by Governor Ferguson. According to John Lomax, this was after singing Long John to her when she visited his convict camp. According to Clear Rock (in Lomax's spelling):

"One day some of my friends in Taylor heard that Miz Ferguson wuz goin' down to Central Farm a visitin' and they sent a car down there with a letter signed by 30,000 peoples, they wuz de names of all de prominent lawyers an' officers and all other whichocrats around `Taylor, an Miz Ferguso set me free."

To this, Lomax added "The population of Taylor is less than 5,000."

Lomax's appreciation for Clear Rock is summarised by Szwed: [He] "seemed to possess an endless body of songs. He also was something of a folklorists dream as he knew any number of individual songs, and was able to make up several new ones on the spot. He never sang the same song twice."

== Recordings ==
Lomax was assisted by Alan, his son who described the first 1933 session as a collaborative effort. "We wrote down and recorded the songs of Clear Rock and Iron Head for a day and a night, and Clear Rock was still indefatigitably improvising. Those two wore us out." John Lomax devoted a chapter to the two singers in his autobiographical Adventures of a Ballad Hunter.

The Lomaxes' appreciation for Iron Head is summarised by Alan's biographer John Szwed: [His] "deep knowledge of songs led John to dub him a black Homer. Baker lived his songs, feeling their emotions viscerally". John Lomax developed an affection for Iron Head, visiting him when in Texas and sending small gifts of money. Iron Head showed his gratitude with a hand-made gift for Ruby Terrill Lomax, John's second wife, and a card for Christmas 1935. This prompted Lomax to arrange for Iron Head to be paroled so that he could assist Lomax in his collecting sessions in other Southern prisons. This was the role fulfilled the previous year by Lead Belly, except that Iron Head was unable to act as chauffeur. At the end of the engagement, Iron Head was to be set up in business exploiting the handicraft skills he had learned in the penitentiary. The Lead Belly partnership had ended in bitter dispute, and the break-up with Iron Head was initially as heated with Iron Head feeling betrayed and Lomax feeling that Iron Head was irredeemable and ungrateful. On his return to Texas, Iron Head was met by Alan Lomax and helped to find work by Ruby Lomax. Within a year, he was caught burglaring again and returned to prison. The break with Lomax was not permanent. In a letter written in 1941 to his son Alan, John quoted Iron Head as telling him "Crime don't pay. I'm walking the straight road now and won't turn back."

Alan was particularly excited by Clear Rock's performance of Bobby Allen (Barbara Allen) which incorporated elements from different textual traditions and different traditional ballads, and by his extended version of the cowboy song of The Old Chisholm Trail. His extempore verses ended in Alan Lomax's account "... with the cowboy pitched off his pinto and lying hung in a mesquite tree.

"Clear Rock, you left that cowboy in a very uncomfortable position, sprawled across that limb."

"Lemme git him down, Boss. Lemme git him down," he said eagerly.

"Cowboy lyin' on a limb a sprawlin'
Come a little win', and down he come a falliin'
With a bum-ti-hiddle-um-a yeah, yum-a-yeah

With a bum-ti-hiddle-um-a-yeah"

=== Discography ===
Many of the songs by Iron Head and Clear Rock remain unreleased. This is a list of their songs issued in collections, in order of publication:

Library of Congress AFS L3: Afro-American Spirituals, Work Songs, And Ballads (1942)
78 rpm album, later reissued on LP and CD

Song	Performers	Recorded
The Grey Goose	Iron Head & group	October 1934

Library of Congress AFS L4: Afro-American Blues And Game Songs (1942)
78 rpm album, later reissued on LP and CD

Song	Performer	Recorded
Run, Nigger Run	Clear Rock	December 1933

Library of Congress AFS L8 Negro Work Songs And Calls (1943)
78 rpm album, later reissued on LP and CD (These titles were previously released as 78 rpm AAFS 38)

Song	Performers	Recorded
Old Rattler	Clear Rock & Iron Head	May 1934
Go Down, Old Hannah	Iron Head, Clear Rock, Will Crosby & R.D. Allen	December 1933

Library of Congress AAFS L54: Versions and variants of Barbara Allen (1964)
LP

Song	Performer	Recorded
Barbara Allen	Clear Rock	December 1933

Document Records: Field Recordings Vol 6 Texas (1997)
CD

Song	Performer	Recorded
Ain't No More Cane On The Brazos	Ernest Williams & Iron Head	December 1933
Go Down Old Hannah	Iron Head, Clear Rock, Will Crosby & R.D. Allen	December 1933
Shorty George	Iron Head	December 1933
The Grey Goose	Iron Head & group	October 1934
Run, Nigger Run	Clear Rock	December 1933
Barbara Allen	Clear Rock	December 1933
Old Rattler	Clear Rock	May 1934
That's All Right Baby	Clear Rock	October 1934

Document Records: Field Recordings Vol 13 Texas Louisiana Arkansas Mississippi Florida Alabama Georgia Tennessee South Carolina Delaware (1997)
CD

Song	Performer	Recorded
Dat's All Right Honey	Clear Rock	December 1933
Pick A Bale O' Cotton	Iron Head	December 1933
Little John Henry	Iron Head	May or October 1934

Deep River Of Song: Black Texicans - Balladeers and Songsters of the Texas Frontier (1999)
CD

Song	Performer	Recorded
St James Hospital	Clear Rock	December 1933
The Old Chisholm Trail	Clear Rock	December 1933
St James Hospital	Iron Head	May 1934
That's All Right Baby	Clear Rock	October 1934
Old Joe Clark	Clear Rock	December 1933
Long Summer Day	Clear Rock	December 1933

Deep River Of Song: Big Brazos - Texas Prison Recordings, 1933 and 1934 (2000)
CD

Song	Performers	Recorded
Black Betty	Iron Head & group	December 1933
Old Rattler	Clear Rock & Iron Head	May 1934

WVU Press Sound Archive Volume Nine: Jail House Bound — John Lomax's First Southern Prison recordings, 1933 (2012)
CD

Song	Performer(s)	Recorded	Notes
Rattler	Clear Rock & unknown (possibly Iron Head)	July 1933	cylinder recording
That's Alright Honey	Iron Head	December 1933	
My Yellow Gal	Iron Head, with R.D. Allen & Will Crosby	December 1933	
Black Betty	Iron Head, with Clear Rock, R.D. Allen & Will Crosby	December 1933	
The Grey Goose	Iron Head, with Clear Rock, R.D. Allen & Will Crosby	December 1933	

CD
