= Skunkhour =

Australian funk rock band

- Also known as: Skunk
- Origin: Lismore, New South Wales, Australia
- Genres: Alternative rock, acid jazz, hip hop, funk
- Years active: 1991–2001, 2009, 2013, 2014, 2023
- Labels: Beast, Id/Mercury, Acid Jazz/Sony, Epic, Universal
- Members: Warwick Scott; Dean Sutherland; Aya Larkin; Del Larkin; Chris Simms
- Past members: Paul Searles; Michael Sutherland

Skunkhour are an Australian funk rock band that were formed in Sydney in 1991. They released four studio albums, Skunkhour (July 1993), Feed (April 1995), Chin Chin (July 1997) and The Go (May 2001) before disbanding in November 2001. Feed peaked at No. 21 on the ARIA Albums Chart while Chin Chin reached No. 34. Four of the group's songs, "Up to Our Necks in It" (1995), "Weightlessness" (1997), "Home" (1999), and "Kick in the Door" (2000) were listed in the annual Triple J Hottest 100. The group has reformed periodically since 2009 for occasional concerts and festival appearances.

Skunkhour began as an urban funk band with the Sutherland brothers—Dean on bass guitar and Michael on drums—and Warwick Scott on lead guitar. They relocated to Sydney by 1992 and were joined by the Larkin brothers—Aya on lead vocals and Del as a rapper—both of whom had a background in ska bands. Del's departure in late 1996 marked a stylistic shift from funk and rap to more melodic funk-based rock.

== History ==
=== 1991–1996 ===
Skunkhour formed in 1991 as an urban funk group in Sydney, originally named Skunk, with the line-up of Warwick Scott on lead guitar, Dean Sutherland on bass guitar and his brother, Michael Sutherland on drums. They were named Skunk to evince a combined "sound of funk and ska, which are major influences".

In early 1992, the "Skunk" trio met Larkin brothers, Aya and Del, and thus the search for vocalists was complete. After a few gigs the Larkins joined the band—renamed Skunkhour after a 1958 poem of the same name by American Robert Lowell—with Aya on lead vocals and Del as a rapper. Their style reflected the members' diverse backgrounds: the Larkins had played in ska bands, Scott was influenced by funk and rock, the Sutherlands had played rock and jazz, while all five were influenced by reggae, 1970s funk and hip hop.

They gained popularity on the Sydney live music scene and by early 1993 they supported United Kingdom acid jazz group, Galliano, on a local tour. Skunkhour signed with independent label, Beast Records, to release their self-titled debut album by July that year, which they had self-produced. Steve Corby of The Canberra Times described their sound as "a layer of thumping bass and drums followed by a thick layer of funk, a hint of grunge and an icing of jazz, all wrapped up by a rap vocal". He reported that they had supported gigs by INXS and by Beastie Boys. An extended play, Booty Full, followed in September. Paul Searles joined soon after on keyboards.

Skunkhour signed with Id/Mercury in 1994 and released two more EPs, State (May) and McSkunk (October). Del told The Canberra Times that as a rapper "I soon discovered that if I wanted to be taken seriously I had to be Australian and rap using Australian words and images". A recording deal with Sony/Epic led to the band's second album, Feed, in April 1995. It was co-produced by the group with David Hemming (The Exponents). According to Australian musicologist, Ian McFarlane, it "featured a more adventurous and varied sound". Feed spent 14 weeks in the top 50 of the ARIA Albums Chart, peaking at No. 21. Two further EPs, Up to Our Necks in It (April 1995) and Sunstone (July), widened their exposure. They signed an international deal with UK label, Acid Jazz Records, which released Feed in Europe to a "positive response".

In early 1996 Skunkhour embarked on a 10-week tour of Europe. However, by March they had written only one new song for their third album, which bothered Aya: "I was saying to Del that we've really got to get going on this new stuff. We might lose momentum if we don't keep creating. So I [asked him] 'What have you got, man?' And he said, 'Mate, I've got nothing'. He'd been saying for a couple of years that he wasn't sure this is what he was meant to do. He didn't feel like a rapper any more. He didn't feel like a lyricist any more. He wanted to go back to his artwork, which is his first love. I said, 'I understand. You should leave the band'". Del completed the tour, then quit to become an in-house artist at Walt Disney Animation Studios in Australia. Aya told Dino Scatena of The Daily Telegraph that "What was best for him was best for us because his malaise might permeate the band and I would much rather he leave and we be strong and revitalised rather than try to perpetuate an old chemistry that wasn't working".

=== 1997–2001 ===
From mid-1996 Skunkhour created a new sound, abandoning spoken-word content and focusing more on melody. Aya described the re-defining moment when Dean provided the bass guitar for "Foam": "It really turned things around. That bassline is just out of control, and I was like, 'God, I want to get on this'. When Deano pulled out that bassline it was like he was leading us into battle." By that time Chris Simms had been added to live gigs as a percussionist. Their third album, Chin Chin, which was co-produced by the group with Magoo (Regurgitator), was preceded by its lead single, "Breathing Through My Eyes" in April. Chin Chin was released in July 1997 to critical acclaim and peaked at No. 34. The Sun-Herald's Peter Holmes described it as "a massive leap forward" from the "clichéd, choppy funk material" of their first two albums, concluding: "Skunkhour's overall feel is heavier, the grooves are deeper and the arrangements a little rockier".

The band toured Australian to promote the album, then returned to Europe, frustrated with low album sales and their inability to gain traction on Australian radio. The following year they were dropped by Sony and forced to curtail European touring. Aya told The Sun-Herald it was a setback that almost brought the band to an end. "Chin Chin didn't go as well as we hoped it would and we felt the band's future had been discounted. It brought about a period where we questioned if we wanted to write together any more. We had a year and a half where we faffed around, tried to write, scrapped 15 songs. There'd be months where we didn't even get together to try stuff". At the ARIA Music Awards of 1998 Magoo won Engineer of the Year for his work on Skunkhour's tracks "Another Childish Man", "Breathing Through My Eyes", "Opportunist" and "Pulse"; as well as his work on "White Skin / Black Heart" by Midnight Oil and Unit by Regurgitator.

In 1999 the band released a single, "Home", and released it independently to test public reaction, according to Aya, "People really liked the song ... We approached the rest of our writing in a new way". Working with producer Steve James, they began recording songs in studios and kitchens, then signed a deal with Universal Music. In May 2001 their fourth album, The Go was issued, which peaked at No. 54 on the ARIA Albums Chart, No. 10 on the Australasian Albums Chart and No. 8 on the Alternative Albums Chart. It, too, received favourable reviews, with The Sunday Telegraph's Kathy McCabe declaring: "It would be a travesty if this album didn't elevate Skunkhour to their deserved position of Australia's best funk-rock band. They achieve a harder edge and energy in these songs, without sacrificing the groove".

In November 2001, six months after the album's release, Skunkhour disbanded, frustrated by a lack of support from Universal, which was experiencing upheavals in Australia. Aya told Ritchie Yorke of The Sunday Mail that the difficulties with the label meant the band was unable to maximise its opportunities. He said: "We decided that we'd rather move on now and look at some other possibilities while we're still drawing big crowds ... Unfortunately, the last album was only heard on Triple J and some community stations, so we didn't really reach the mainstream with it. This was despite our hopes that the album might have taken us to another level. It was given great reviews and we really thought the music got us back in touch with the fans. But overall, we just wanted to go out on a high. We didn't want to overstay our welcome".

Sutherland told The Daily Telegraph's Matthew Frilingos that the group had achieved several of its goals: "We definitely imagined that we'd tour overseas and sell records overseas and we did that. We've been treated really well by record companies and also treated fairly poorly. We've seen the whole gamut. We've been hit by a little bit of bad luck. There's been major restructuring of two record companies we've been with and with that, a broom goes through a whole lot of projects and we were caught in the wash a couple of times".

Four tracks by Skunkhour were listed on the annual Triple J's Hottest 100 during the band's 10-year career: in 1995, "Up to Our Necks in It" reached No. 55, "Weightlessness" reached No. 93 in 1997, "Home" reached No. 82 in 1999, and "Kick in the Door" reached No. 83 in 2000.

=== Revivals ===
In October 2009 Skunkhour announced that they were reuniting for a nine-gig partial tour of Australia in December. In mid-November 2012 they performed a one-off 20th anniversary gig at The Standard Hotel, Sydney. Subsequent performances have included the 2013 Apollo Bay Music festival in March; 2014 Byron Bay Bluesfest in April; and a performance of their debut album, Skunkhour at the 2014 Queenscliff Music Festival in November.

The band reassembled to play their debut album Skunkhour in full, plus a second set of hits and favourites, at The Metro in Sydney on 30 April 2016. After positive reviews and reception from fans in 2016, Skunkhour returned to The Metro on 27 May 2017 to perform Feed in full, again with a second set of material from other releases. Former band member Michael Sutherland died from a heart attack on 17 September 2025, at the age of 57. He will be missed and will be celebrated at future Skunkhour revivals honoring his legacy.

== Members ==
According to sources:

- Warwick Scott – lead guitar (1991–2001)
- Dean Sutherland – bass guitar (1991–2001)
- Michael Sutherland – drums (1991–2001; died 2025)
- Aya Larkin – lead vocals (1992–2001)
- Del Larkin – lead vocals (1992–1996)
- Paul Searles – keyboards (1993–2001)
- Chris Simms – percussion (1996–2001)

== Discography ==
=== Albums ===
List of albums, with selected details and chart positions
Title	Details	Peak chart positions
Title	Details	AUS
Skunkhour	Released: February 1993; Label: Beast	167
Feed	Released: April 1995; Label: Id, Mercury	21
Chin Chin	Released: August 1997; Label: Epic	34
The Go	Released: May 2001; Label: Universal	54

=== Compilations ===
- Essential Skunkhour (Sony, 2010)

=== Extended plays ===
List of EPs, with selected details and chart positions
Title	Details	Peak chart positions
Title	Details	AUS
Booty Full	Released: August 1993; Label: Beast	129
State	Released: April 1994; Label: Id, Mercury	115
McSkunk	Released: October 1994; Label: Id, Mercury	52
Up to Our Necks in It	Released: April 1995; Label: Id, Mercury	56
Sunstone	Released: July 1995; Label: Id, Mercury	104

=== Singles ===
List of singles, with selected chart positions
Title	Year	Peak chart positions	Album
Title	Year	AUS	Album
"Up to Our Necks in It" (12-inch LP)	1995	—N/a	Feed
"That's the Way"	1996	136	Feed
"Breathing Through My Eyes"	1997	77	Chin Chin
"Weightlessness"	1997	97	Chin Chin
"Morning Rolls"	1997	167	Chin Chin
"Tomorrow's Too Soon for Goodbye"	1998	promo	Chin Chin
"Home"	1999	106	The Go
"Kick in the Door"	2000	120	The Go
"Gold Radiation"	2001	189	The Go

=== Other appearances ===
- "Bootyfull" appeared on "The Next Wave" (1993)
- "Up to Our Necks in It" appeared on Triple J Hottest 100 vol. 3 (1995)
- "Breathing Through My Eyes" appeared on Coca-Cola Sampler (1997)
- "Up To Our Necks in It" appeared on Original Flavor - The Best of Acid Jazz Volume III (1997)
- "Breathing Through My Eyes" appeared on Alternative Nation - 19 Original Alternative Cuts (1998)
- "Stadium" appeared on Two Hands Soundtrack (1999)
- "Home" appeared on Triple J Hottest 100 vol. 7 (1999)
- "Kick in the Door" appeared on Triple J Hottest 100 vol. 8 (2000)
