= The Tenants (band) =

Australian pub rock band

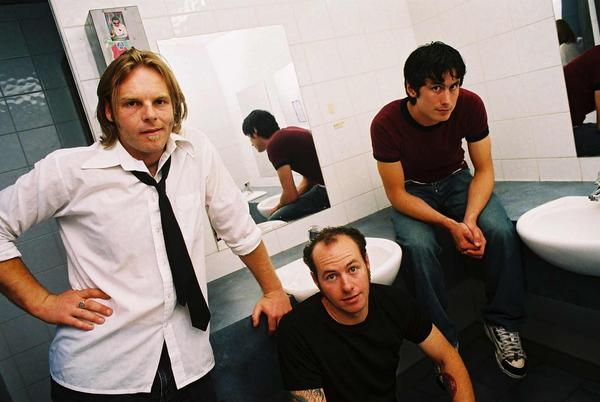

Background information
- Origin: Bathurst, New South Wales, Australia
- Genres: Australian pub rock; ska
- Years active: 1998–present
- Label: Modern/Sony BMG
- Members: Jeff Moore; Jason Rooke; Anthony Layton
- Past members: Dean Bakota; Gregory Thorsby
- Website: Official website

The Tenants are an Australian pub rock band from Bathurst, New South Wales, which formed in 1998. The band won a regional final for Triple J Unearthed in 1998 with the song, "You Shit Me to Tears", which was listed at No. 3 on the Triple J Hottest 100, 1999 radio listeners' poll. They issued one full-length album, Everything You Know Is Wrong (27 January 2006).

== Members ==
=== Members ===
- Jeff Moore (a.k.a. JJ LaMoore) – bass guitar (1998–present)
- Jason Rooke (a.k.a. Jase the Ace) – vocals, guitar (1998–present)
- Anthony Layton (a.k.a. Ant Layton) – drums (2002–present)

=== Past Members ===
- Dean Bakota (a.k.a. Deanie B) – drums (1998–2002)
- Gregory J Thorsby – guitar (1998–2001)

== Discography ==
=== Albums ===
Album, with selected details
Title	Details
Everything You Know is Wrong	Released: January 2006; Label: Modern Music (MM0031); Format: CD

=== Extended plays ===
Extended play, with selected details
Title	Details
Caucasian Overbite	Released: 2002; Label: MGM Distribution (DVDA69); Format: Enhanced CD

=== Singles ===
List of singles, with selected chart positions
Title	Year	Chart peak positions	Album
Title	Year	AUS	Album
"You Shit Me to Tears"	1999	54	
"Boredom"	2000	—	Caucasian Overbite
"Pub Girl"	2001	—	Caucasian Overbite
"Ready to Rumble"	2003	—	Everything You Know Is Wrong
