= Plastic (Spiderbait song) =

Single by Spiderbait

from the album Grand Slam
- Released: September 1999
- Recorded: 1998
- Studio: Q Studios, Sing Sing Studios
- Length: 2:31
- Label: Polydor
- Producer: Phil McKellar

Spiderbait singles chronology
"Stevie" (1999)	"Plastic" (1999)	"Glokenpop" (2000)

Music video
- "Plastic" on YouTube

"Plastic" is a song by Australian alternative rock band, Spiderbait and was released in September 1999 as the third single from the band's fourth studio album Grand Slam (1999). "Plastic" peaked at number 84 on the Australian chart and ranked at number 96 on Triple J's Hottest 100 in 1999.

== Track listing ==
Australian CD single
No.	Title	Length
1.	"Plastic"	2:31
2.	"Shazam!" (Wave Your Hands in the Air remix)
3.	"King of the Northern" (Karaoke)
4.	"Lost in Adelaide" (Karaoke)

== Charts ==
Chart (1999)	Peak position
Australia (ARIA Charts)	84

== Release history ==
Region	Date	Format	Label	Catalogue
Australia	September 1999	CD Single	Polydor Records	157332–2
