= Spiderbait (album) =

Studio album by Spiderbait
- Released: 15 November 2013
- Recorded: 2013
- Genres: Alternative rock, hard rock
- Length: 49:43
- Label: Universal
- Producer: François Tétaz

Spiderbait chronology
Greatest Hits (2005)	Spiderbait (2013)	B-Sides Collection (2017)

Singles from Spiderbait
- 1. "Straight Through the Sun" Released: 6 September 2013; 2. "It's Beautiful" Released: 4 October 2013

Professional ratings
Review scores
Source	Rating
The Sydney Morning Herald	3.5/5 stars

Spiderbait is the seventh studio album by Australian rock band Spiderbait. Released in 2013, it was the band's first album since 2005's Greatest Hits compilation, and first studio album since Tonight Alright in 2004.

== Track listing ==
All tracks are written by Spiderbait except as noted

No.	Title	Length
1.	"Straight Through the Sun"	3:55
2.	"It's Beautiful" (Spiderbait, François Tétaz)	3:40
3.	"Miss the Boat"	5:12
4.	"Supersonic"	4:33
5.	"Where's the Baseline" (Spiderbait, Dan Hulme)	3:17
6.	"I'm Not Your Slave"	3:12
7.	"Get Bent"	3:01
8.	"What You Get"	3:33
9.	"Freakazoid"	1:37
10.	"Crazy Pants (Rockstar for a Night)" (Spiderbait, François Tétaz)	3:40
11.	"Mars"	4:22
12.	"Reach for the Sky"	4:31
13.	"The Sun Will Come Shining"	2:36
14.	"Goodbye"	2:34

== Charts ==
Chart (2013)	Peak position
Australian Albums (ARIA)	30

== Release history ==
Country	Release date	Format	Label	Catalogue
Australia	15 November 2013	CD, LP, Digital Download	Mercury	3758200
