= Chin Chin (album) =

Studio album by Skunkhour
- Released: July 1997
- Recorded: Velvet Sound, Sydney
- Genre: Indie rock
- Length: 55:24
- Label: Epic Records
- Producer: Skunkhour, Magoo

Skunkhour chronology
Feed (1995)	Chin Chin (1997)	The Go (2001)

Professional ratings
Review scores
Source	Rating
Daily Telegraph	8/10 stars
Sydney Morning Herald	4/5 stars
Sunday Herald Sun	4/5 stars

Chin Chin is the third album by Australian band Skunkhour. It was released in 1997 and peaked at No.34 on the Australian album charts in August. The album was the second on the Sony/Epic label and was produced by Magoo, whose credits included Regurgitator and Powderfinger.

Three singles were taken from the album—"Breathing Through My Eyes" (May 1997), "Weightlessness" (August) and "Morning Rolls" (November).

The album was the band's first after the departure of founding vocalist/rapper Del Larkin, who quit to pursue a career in Walt Disney Animation Studios. Bassist Dean Sutherland told the Herald Sun the lineup change forced a reshaping of the band's sound from funk-influenced hip hop to robust electronic soul. "It's the exit of the rap and the entrance of melody," he said. "I love hip hop, but with Del leaving, we weren't going to try and fill his shoes by getting another rapper, so we just continued without him."

The band conceived and developed many of the tracks while touring in Europe in early 1997 and said the sound bore some European influences. "We get a lot of our musical ideas from sound checks," guitarist Warwick Scott told The Age. "We just jammed and a lot of the new material came from those sound checks all over Europe."

== Track listing ==
(All songs written by Skunkhour)

1. "Breathing Through My Eyes" – 4:12
2. "Chew" – 4:21
3. "Morning Rolls" – 4:40
4. "Tomorrow's Too Soon" – 4:06
5. "Foam" – 5:18
6. "Unison" – 5:33
7. "Opportunist" – 3:03
8. "Another Childish Man" – 4:46
9. "Old Shoe Horn" – 5:02
10. "Weightlessness" – 3:58
11. "Nature Stripped" – 4:47
12. "Pulse" – 5:35

== Personnel ==
- Aya Larkin – vocals
- Warwick Scott – guitar
- Dean Sutherland – bass
- Michael Sutherland – drums
- Paul Searles – keyboards
- Chris Simms – percussion

== Charts ==
Chart performance for Chin Chin
Chart (1997)	Peak position
Australian Albums (ARIA)	34
