= Hot Water & Milk =

Single by Spiderbait

from the album Ivy and the Big Apples
- Released: December 1996
- Studio: Studios 301
- Length: 1:56
- Label: Polydor
- Songwriters: Janet English; Kram; Damian Whitty

Spiderbait singles chronology
"Buy Me a Pony" (1996)	"Hot Water & Milk" (1996)	"Calypso" (1997)

Music video
- "Hot Water & Milk" on YouTube

"Hot Water & Milk" (also written "Hot Water and Milk") is a song by Australian alternative rock band Spiderbait, released in December 1996 as the second single from the band's third studio album Ivy and the Big Apples. It peaked at number 78 on the Australian chart.

== Track listings ==
Australian CD Single
No.	Title	Length
1.	"Hot Water and Milk"	1:56
2.	"Big Furry Green Monster"	3:02
3.	"Phil's Essential Oils"	3:52
4.	"Conjunctivitis"	2:14

== Charts ==
Chart (1997)	Peak position
Australia (ARIA Charts)	78

== Release history ==
Region	Date	Format	Label	Catalogue
Australia	December 1996	CD Single	Polydor Records	5731252
