= SHAZAM (interbank network) =

US interbank and EFTPOS network

- Operating area: United States
- Members: ±100s
- ATMs: ±1000s
- Founded: 1976; 49 years ago
- Owner: Owned by its members (Not-for-profit corporation)
- Website: www.shazam.net

SHAZAM is a United States–based interbank network and EFTPOS network headquartered in Johnston, Iowa that operates primarily in the Midwestern United States. The network was founded in 1976 and is a member-owned financial services and payments processing company.

SHAZAM is a single-source provider of debit cards, automated teller machines (ATMs), merchant, marketing, training, risk, fraud prevention and ACH Network services.

They are partnered with Presto!, a similar network covering the southeastern part of the US.

== See also ==
- ATM usage fees
