= Need for Speed: Underground Rivals =

- North American cover art
- Developer: Team Fusion
- Publisher: Electronic Arts
- Director: Brad Fulton
- Producer: David McCarthy
- Designer: David Seymour
- Programmer: Trenton Shumay
- Artist: Terry Chui
- Series: Need for Speed
- Platform: PlayStation Portable
- Release: JP: February 24, 2005; NA: March 14, 2005; EU: September 1, 2005
- Genre: Racing

Need for Speed: Underground Rivals is a 2005 racing video game developed by Team Fusion and published by Electronic Arts for the PlayStation Portable. It is the first Need for Speed title released for the PlayStation Portable. It is a PSP spin-off of the Underground titles and follows a very similar gameplay style.

== Gameplay ==
Race events take place only at night, and players cannot access free roam. Tuning is a major aspect of the game; to unlock more performance and visual upgrades, players must accumulate 'Upgrade Points'.

Players can play in both Underground (Career) and Quick Race modes. Underground mode is available on four difficulty levels. Statistics can be viewed on the driver status screen in My Underground.

=== Game Modes ===
- Circuit Race: This mode is divided into four classes: Master, Novice, Pro, and Car Spec. The first three are simply race events with power restrictions, while Car Spec allows only the required cars to participate in specific events.
- Drag Race: In a long, straight race, players accelerate their car to top speed. This mode can only be played with a manual transmission.
- Drift Attack: Players must drift through various markers placed on the ground. The winner is the one who accumulates the most drift points.
- Lap Knockout Race: Any player who completes a lap in last place is eliminated. This continues until only one player remains.
- Nitrous Run: To win the race, players must pass from one checkpoint (called a "gate") to another. Passing through a gate adds time and nitrous.
- Street Cross: Racers will drive on a tight inner circuit that mainly contains 90° and 180° turns. Street Cross is heavily based on Street X.
- Rally Relay: Players complete two laps around a circuit. After completing the first lap, the player must change vehicles.

=== Customization ===
Players don't gain any advantage from visually customizing their car since there's no star rating system. Visual parts aren't sold separately, but only in body kits. However, players can now write their own lettering and place it on the windshield, taillights, and hood.

The most important feature is performance modifications, which allow players to alter acceleration, top speed, and handling. Any car in this game can be upgraded to be highly competitive, even against the strongest production cars. After purchasing a performance part, players can install it on other vehicles without having to buy it again.

== Reception ==
Reception

Aggregate scores
Aggregator	Score
GameRankings	77.32% (45 reviews)
Metacritic	74/100 (36 reviews)

Review scores
Publication	Score
1Up.com	8/10
Eurogamer	6/10
GameRevolution	B−
GameSpot	7.9/10
GameSpy	3.5/5
GameZone	8/10
IGN	7.9/10
Play	86/100
