= Outta My Head (Spiderbait song) =

Single by Spiderbait

from the album The Flight of Wally Funk
- Released: November 2001
- Recorded: 2001
- Studio: Sing Sing Studios
- Length: 3:07
- Label: Universal Music
- Songwriter(s): Spiderbait
- Producer(s): Spiderbait and Magoo

Spiderbait singles chronology
"Four on the Floor" (2001)	"Outta My Head" (2001)	"Arse Huggin' Pants"/"Bo Bo" (2002)

Music video
- "Outta My Head" on YouTube

"Outta My Head" is a song by Australian alternative rock band, Spiderbait and was released in November 2001 as the second single from the band's fifth studio album The Flight of Wally Funk. "Outta My Head" peaked at number 89 on the Australian chart and ranked at number 71 on Triple J's Hottest 100 in 2001.

== Track listings ==
Australian CD Single
No.	Title	Length
1.	"Outta My Head"	2:35
2.	"Jive Talkin'" (cover of the Bee Gees song)	3:55
3.	"Stars On 44.1"	3:43
4.	"Inner Ear Infection" (remix)	6:00

== Charts ==
Chart (2001)	Peak position
Australia (ARIA Charts)	89

== Release history ==
Region	Date	Format	Label	Catalogue
Australia	November 2001	CD Single	Universal Music Australia	0154712
