= The Go (Skunkhour album) =

Studio album by Skunkhour
- Released: May 2001
- Recorded: Velvet Sound, Sydney
- Genre: Indie rock
- Length: 44:34
- Label: Grudge Records/Universal
- Producer: Steve James, Skunkhour

Skunkhour chronology
| Chin Chin (1997) | The Go (2001) | Essential Skunkhour (2010) |

Singles from Album
- 1. "Home" Released: October 1999; 2. "Kick in the Door" Released: October 2000; 3. "Gold Radiation" Released: April 2001

Professional ratings
Review scores
| Source | Rating |
|---|---|
| Daily Telegraph | 3/5 stars |
| Sunday Telegraph | 3/5 stars |
| Sunday Herald Sun | 4/5 stars |

The Go is the fourth and final studio album by Australian band Skunkhour. It was released in 2001. "Home" was released as a single in 1999 and two further singles were taken from the album—"Gold Radiation" (April 2001) and "Kick in the Door".

Singer Aya Larkin said the band, which had been forced to abandon a European touring schedule after being dropped by Sony Music in 1998, had been overtaken by a sense of despondency and found it hard to write. "Chin Chin didn't go as well as we hoped it would and we felt the band's future had been discounted. It brought about a period where we questioned if we wanted to write together any more. We had a year and a half where we faffed around, tried to write, scrapped 15 songs. There'd be months where we didn't even get together to try stuff."

The "Home" single, he said, "just kind of happened. We released it as an independent single to see whether or not we wanted to keep going, and people really liked the song. We approached the rest of our writing in a new way, and from that came this new album."

The Go was recorded and mixed in kitchens, studios and INXS bassist Garry Gary Beers' studio in Mangrove Mountain on the New South Wales Central Coast and completed before the band was signed to Universal Music.

In November 2001, six months after the release of The Go, Skunkhour disbanded, frustrated by a lack of support from Universal, which was experiencing upheavals in Australia. Larkin said the difficulties with the label meant the band was unable to maximise its opportunities. "We decided that we'd rather move on now and look at some other possibilities while we're still drawing big crowds," he told the Brisbane Sunday Mail. "Unfortunately, the last album was only heard on Triple J and some community stations, so we didn't really reach the mainstream audience with it. This was despite our hopes that the album might have taken us to another level. It was given great reviews and we really thought the music got us back in touch with the fans. But overall, we just wanted to go out on a high. We didn't want to overstay our welcome."

== Track listing ==
(All songs written by Skunkhour)

1. "Gold Radiation" – 3:51
2. "Kick in the Door" – 3:04
3. "Sunny Side Up" – 3:40
4. "Because You're Real" – 3:37
5. "Green Grocer" – 5:31
6. "Home" – 3:19
7. "Today Tomorrow Yesterday" – 4:27
8. "Something Between Us" – 4:33
9. "Easy Pieces" – 3:59
10. "Stadium" – 4:03
11. "Anywhere" – 4:28

== Personnel ==
- Aya Larkin – vocals
- Warwick Scott – guitar
- Dean Sutherland – bass
- Michael Sutherland – drums
- Paul Searles – keyboards
- Chris Simms – percussion

== Charts ==
Chart performance for The Go
| Chart (2001) | Peak position |
|---|---|
| Australian Albums (ARIA) | 54 |
