= Stevie (Spiderbait song) =

Single by Spiderbait

from the album Grand Slam
- Released: May 1999
- Recorded: 1998
- Studio: Q Studios, Sing Sing Studios
- Length: 3:00
- Label: Polydor
- Producer(s): Phil McKellar

Spiderbait singles chronology
"Shazam!" (1999)	"Stevie" (1999)	"Plastic" (1999)

Music video
- "Stevie" on YouTube

"Stevie" is a song by Australian alternative rock band, Spiderbait and was released in May 1999 as the second single from the band's fourth studio album Grand Slam (1999). "Stevie" peaked at number 81 on the Australian chart and ranked at number 84 on Triple J's Hottest 100 in 1999.

== Track listing ==
Australian CD single
No.	Title	Length
1.	"Stevie"	3:00
2.	"Buster" (remix)
3.	"When You Win the Brownlow" (demo)
4.	"Eleven Foot Six" (demo)

== Charts ==
Chart (1999)	Peak position
Australia (ARIA Charts)	81

== Release history ==
Region	Date	Format	Label	Catalogue
Australia	May 1999	CD Single	Polydor Records	156905-2
