= Four on the Floor (Spiderbait song) =

Single by Spiderbait

from the album The Flight of Wally Funk
- Released: 20 August 2001
- Recorded: 2001
- Studio: Sing Sing Studios
- Length: 3:07
- Label: Universal Music
- Songwriters: Janet English; Kram; Damian Whitty
- Producers: Spiderbait; Magoo

Spiderbait singles chronology
"Glokenpop" (2000)	"Four on the Floor" (2001)	"Outta My Head" (2001)

Music video
- "Four on the Floor" on YouTube

"Four on the Floor" is a song by Australian alternative rock band, Spiderbait and was released in August 2001 as the lead single from the band's fifth studio album The Flight of Wally Funk. "Four on the Floor" peaked at number 91 on the Australian chart and ranked at number 89 on Triple J's Hottest 100 in 2001.

== Track listings ==
Australian CD Single
No.	Title	Length
1.	"Four on the Floor" (album version)	3:07
2.	"Four on the Floor" (instrumental)
3.	"Four on the Floor" (remix)
4.	"Four on the Floor" (How's Your Father Mix)

== Charts ==
Chart (2001)	Peak position
Australia (ARIA Charts)	91

== Release history ==
Region	Date	Format	Label	Catalogue	Ref.
Australia	20 August 2001	CD single	Universal Music Australia	0151932	
