= ShashavaGlava =

Studio album by Spiderbait
- Released: 30 January 1993
- Recorded: August 1991, Stable Sound; October 1992, Atlantis Studios
- Genres: Alternative rock, metal
- Length: 52:26
- Labels: Au Go Go (original issue); Universal / Polydor (reissue)
- Producer: Spiderbait

Spiderbait chronology
P'tang Yang Kipper Bang Uh! (1991)	ShashavaGlava (1993)	Run (1993)

Professional ratings
Review scores
Source	Rating
AllMusic	2/5 stars
Head Heritage	favourable

ShashavaGlava is the debut studio album by Australian rock band Spiderbait. "Shashavaglava" (Serbo-Croatian: шашава глава, romanized: šašava glava) means "crazyhead" or "dickhead" in Serbo-Croatian. The final seven tracks are incorporated from an earlier EP, P'tang Yang Kipper Bang Uh!.

It was originally released in January 1993 on Au Go Go. Some time after Spiderbait signed to Polygram, the album was reissued on the new label.

== Track listing ==
ShashavaGlava
No.	Title	Length
1.	"Word I Said"	2:56
2.	"Too Much"	5:03
3.	"7 Zark 7"	3:16
4.	"Run"	1:55
5.	"Bergerac"	3:49
6.	"Ol' Man Sam"	3:05
7.	"B & T"	4:37
8.	"Boys at the Beak"	2:04
9.	"Shakespeare's Tacklebox"	3:27
10.	"ShaShaVaGlava"	3:47

P'TangYangKipperBangUh
No.	Title	Length
11.	"Scenester"	3:03
12.	"Footy"	1:53
13.	"Another Brick in the Head"	3:52
14.	"Old Man Sam"	2:40
15.	"Invisible Man"	3:06
16.	"K.C.R."	3:39
17.	"Fucken Ace"	3:54

Note: Some releases have incorrect track marks. The song "ShaShaVaGlava" is split over two tracks, while "Invisible Man" and "K.C.R." appear as a single track. This causes the track numbers of the intervening tracks to be offset by one. The issue was also present in the iTunes and Spotify release, though in place of Scenester was a duplicate of Footy.

== Charts ==
Weekly chart performance for ShashavaGlava
Chart (1993–1995)	Peak position
Australian Albums (ARIA)	170

== Release history ==
Country	Release date	Format	Label	Catalogue	Ref.
Australia	30 January 1993	CD	Au Go Go	ANDA 147CD	
Australia	17 August 1998	CD	Polydor	527984–2	
Worldwide	4 April 2021	Digital download	Universal Music Australia	—N/a	
Worldwide	11 June 2026	Digital download	Universal Music Australia	—N/a	
