= Ivy and the Big Apples =

Studio album by Spiderbait
- Released: 14 October 1996
- Recorded: March and August 1996
- Studio: Studios 301 (Sydney); Rockinghorse (Coorabell)
- Genre: Alternative rock; grunge; hard rock; experimental rock; punk rock
- Length: 52:52
- Label: Polydor
- Producer: Spiderbait; Phil McKellar; Paul McKercher

Spiderbait chronology
The Unfinished Spanish Galleon of Finley Lake (1995)	Ivy and the Big Apples (1996)	Live in Canada and Australia!! (1997)

Singles from Ivy and the Big Apples
- 1. "Buy Me a Pony" Released: September 1996; 2. "Hot Water & Milk" Released: December 1996; 3. "Calypso" Released: April 1997; 4. "Joyce's Hut"/"Horschack Army" Released: September 1997

Professional ratings
Review scores
Source	Rating
AllMusic	4/5 stars

Ivy and the Big Apples is the third studio album by Australian rock band Spiderbait. It became a double platinum-selling record that reached the top 10 of the albums chart in Australia and won the 1997 ARIA Award for Best Alternative Release. It features the single "Buy Me a Pony", which was voted in at number one on the Triple J Hottest 100, 1996. The third single "Calypso" peaked at number 13 on the Australian singles chart and was notably featured in the movie 10 Things I Hate About You, despite not being included on the soundtrack. Speaking to Double J in 2016, English explained that the group's success was as surprising as it was improbable. In an interview with Rolling Stone Australia, English remarked, "We were a pretty unlikely hit band," and "[We had] two singers and this genre spread where people couldn't quite pin down what we were doing."

== Recording ==
The album was both recorded at Studios 301 in Sydney and Rockinghorse Studios in Byron Bay. The album's title was named after a lady named Ivy who lived in Finley, New South Wales and sold big apples. Tracks 1 to 6 and 12 to 16 were recorded at Studio 301 in Sydney by Phil McKellar, assisted by Aaron Pratley and produced by Phil and Spiderbait. At Studio 301 the Neve desk and many of the old microphones remained from the studios origins. The room itself was big and beautifully designed. Thus the sounds had more presence and clarity than in previous recordings. A good example of this is the track "Goin Off" where Janet's vocals were done with an old German AKG mike that dated back to the 1950s. Kram's drum sounds and Whit's guitar in "Chest Hair" and "Driving Up the Ceiling" not only reflects the warm ambience of the room but also illustrates how the studio's equipment and Phil's production improved the overall sound of the record. Tracks 7 to 11 tell a different story.

Recorded at Rockinghorse Studios in Byron Bay by Paul McKercher and produced by Paul and Spiderbait. The band wanted to provide the record with more dynamics. A rawer more abrasive sound was achieved from Rockinghorse Studios. Paul's production on "Don't Kill Nipper" and "Conjunctivitis" show the trashy side of the band. Also, from these sessions came Whit's looped-based tracks "Horschack Army" and "Joyce's Hut". In between the recordings, the band embarked on their first overseas tour through Canada and the U.S.

== Legacy ==
Ivy was a turning point for the group. Ivy and the Big Apples became Spiderbait's most successful album, selling almost 250,000 copies. The album's first single, "Buy Me a Pony", was voted Triple J's Hottest 100 and received over 300,000 votes in December 1996. It was the first ever Australian release to be voted #1 song of the year. The album peaked at #2 on the national charts, and the third single Calypso became the band's largest seller, going gold in 1997.

The record also won Spiderbait's first ARIA award in October 1997 for Best Alternative Release. Radio airplay became more prominent than ever before, even commercial rock stations like Triple M picked up on the singles.

In 2021, Rolling Stone Australia called Ivy and the Big Apples the 72nd greatest Australian album on their 200 Greatest Australian Albums list. In 2016, the band announced the first vinyl issue of the album, along with this, they announced a national tour celebrating 20 years of Ivy & The Big Apples. In 2021, in celebration of the album's 25th anniversary, the album was reissued on red vinyl.

== Track listing ==
No.	Title	Length
1.	"Chest Hair"	3:28
2.	"Hot Water & Milk"	1:56
3.	"Buy Me a Pony"	1:44
4.	"When Fusion Ruled the Earth"	6:20
5.	"Calypso"	1:51
6.	"Goin' Off"	1:02
7.	"Don't Kill Nipper"	2:25
8.	"Horschack Army"	3:37
9.	"Conjunctivitis"	1:25
10.	"Joyce's Hut"	3:41
11.	"Jasper"	3:02
12.	"Goosh"	1:45
13.	"Should Have Done What My Mum Always Told Me To"	3:15
14.	"Hey"	1:19
15.	"Hawaiian Nights"	2:52
16.	"Driving Up the Ceiling"	13:10

- "Driving Up the Ceiling" ends at 6:45. After one minute of silence (6:45 - 7:45) there are two hidden tracks:
  the first hidden track, "Big Furry Green Monster", begins at 7:45 and ends at 10:45;
  the second hidden track, "Sprinkler", begins at 10:50 and ends at 13:10.

== Charts ==
=== Weekly charts ===
Chart (1996/97)	Peak position
Australian Albums (ARIA)	3

=== Year-end charts ===
Chart (1996)	Rank
Australian Albums Chart	68
Chart (1997)	Rank
Australian Albums Chart	37
Australian Artist Albums Chart	11

== Certifications ==
Region	Certification	Certified units/sales
Australia (ARIA)	2× Platinum	140,000^{^}
^{^} Shipments figures based on certification alone.

== Release history ==
Country	Release date	Format	Label	Catalogue
Australia	14 October 1996	CD	Polydor	533 674-2
Australia	14 October 1996	Cassette	Polydor	533 674-4
Australia	7 October 2016	LP	Universal Music Australia	4783638
Australia	15 October 2021	LP	Universal Music Australia	4783638
Australia	3 July 2026	LP	Universal Music Australia	5753907
