= Black Betty =

20th-century African-American work song

Song by Lead Belly

from the album Negro Sinful Songs
- Released: 1939
- Genre: Work song
- Length: 1:55
- Label: Musicraft
- Songwriter: Traditional

"Black Betty" (Roud 11668) is a 20th-century African-American work song often credited to Huddie "Lead Belly" Ledbetter as the author, though the earliest recordings are by James "Iron Head" Baker and Moses "Clear Rock" Platt, not Lead Belly. Some sources say it is one of Lead Belly's many adaptations of earlier folk material.

There are numerous recorded versions, including a cappella and folk. The song was eventually, with modified lyrics, remade as a rock song by the American band Ram Jam in 1977. Subsequent recordings, including hits by Tom Jones and Spiderbait, retain the structure of this version.

== Meaning and origin ==
The origin and meaning of the lyrics are subject to debate. Historically, the "Black Betty" of the title may refer to the nickname given to a number of objects: a bottle of whiskey, a whip, or a penitentiary transfer wagon. However, in more modern song references, the term "Black Betty" alludes to a fast car or motorcycle.

David Hackett Fischer, in his book Albion's Seed: Four British Folkways in America (Oxford University Press, 1989), states that "Black Betty" was a common term for a bottle of whisky in the borderlands between Northern England and southern Scotland; it later became a euphemism in the backcountry areas of the eastern United States. In January 1736, Benjamin Franklin published The Drinker's Dictionary in the Pennsylvania Gazette offering 228 round-about phrases for being drunk. One of those phrases is "He's kiss'd black Betty." Other sources give the meaning of "Black Betty" in the United States (from at least 1827) as a liquor bottle.

In Caldwells's Illustrated Combination Centennial Atlas of Washington Co. Pennsylvania of 1876, a short section describes wedding ceremonies and marriage customs, including a wedding tradition where two young men from the bridegroom procession were challenged to run for a bottle of whiskey. This challenge was usually given when the bridegroom party was about a mile from the destination-home where the ceremony was to be had. Upon securing the prize, referred to as "Black Betty", the winner of the race would bring the bottle back to the bridegroom and his party. The whiskey was offered to the bridegroom first and then successively to each of the groom's friends.

John A. and Alan Lomax's 1934 book, American Ballads and Folk Songs describes the origins of "Black Betty":

"Black Betty is not another Frankie, nor yet a two-timing woman that a man can moan his blues about. She is the whip that was and is used in some Southern prisons. A convict on the Darrington State Farm in Texas, where, by the way, whipping has been practically discontinued, laughed at Black Betty and mimicked her conversation in the following song." (In the text, the music notation and lyrics follow.)

— Lomax, John A. and Alan Lomax, American Ballads and Folk Songs. (1934; reprint, New York: Dover, 1994), 60-1

John Lomax also interviewed blues musician Iron Head in 1934, almost one year after Iron Head performed the first known recorded performance of the song. In the resulting article for Musical Quarterly, titled "'Sinful Songs' of the Southern Negro", Lomax again mentions the nickname of the bullwhip is "Black Betty". Steven Cornelius in his book, Music of the Civil War Era, states in a section concerning folk music following the war's end that "prisoners sang of 'Black Betty', the driver's whip."

In an interview conducted by Alan Lomax with former Texas penal farm prisoner Doc "Big Head" Reese, Reese stated that the term "Black Betty" was used by prisoners to refer to the "Black Maria" — the penitentiary transfer wagon.

Robert Vells, in Life Flows On in Endless Song: Folk Songs and American History, writes:

As late as the 1960s, the vehicle that carried men to prison was known as "Black Betty," though the same name may have also been used for the whip that so often was laid on the prisoners' backs, "bam-ba-lam."

— Wells, Robert V., Life Flows On in Endless Song: Folk Songs and American History. (Board of Trustees of the University of Illinois, 2009) 156.

In later versions, "Black Betty" was depicted as various vehicles, including a motorcycle and a hot rod.

== Early recordings (1933–1939) ==
The song was first recorded in the field by US musicologists John and Alan Lomax in December 1933, performed a cappella by convicts Iron Head, Clear Rock, and a group at Central State Farm in Sugar Land, Texas (a State prison farm). Baker (Iron Head) was 63 years old at the time of the recording.

The Lomaxes were recording for the Library of Congress and later field recordings in 1934, 1936, and 1939 also include versions of "Black Betty". A notated version was published in 1934 in the Lomaxes book American Ballads and Folk Songs. It was recorded commercially in New York in April 1939 for the Musicraft Records label by Lead Belly, as part of a medley with two other work songs: "Looky Looky Yonder" and "Yellow Woman's Doorbells". Musicraft issued the recording in 1939 as part of a 78 rpm five-disc album entitled Negro Sinful Songs sung by Lead Belly. Lead Belly had a long association with the Lomaxes, and had himself served time in State prison farms. Lead Belly was first recorded by the Lomaxes in 1933 when he was approximately 44 years old. John Lomax helped Lead Belly get the recording contract with Musicraft in 1939.

== Post-1939 ==
While Lead Belly's 1939 recording was also performed a cappella (with hand claps in place of hammer blows), most subsequent versions added guitar accompaniment. These include folk-style recordings in 1964 by Odetta (as a medley with "Looky Yonder", with staccato guitar strums in place of hand claps), and Alan Lomax himself.

Singer Dave Ray of the folk-blues trio Koerner, Ray and Glover also recorded the song unaccompanied on their 1964 album Lots More Blues, Rags and Hollers.

In 1968, Manfred Mann released a version of the song, arranged for a band, on their LP Mighty Garvey!, with the title and lyrics changed to "Big Betty". In 1972, Manfred Mann's Earth Band performed "Black Betty" live for John Peel's In Concert on the BBC, this version was released in 2019 on the double CD / triple LP Radio Days Volume 4, which also contains an earlier rendition from 1971 under the title "Big Betty". The same musical arrangement but with a new lyric and altered vocal melody appeared on the Earth Band's second album Glorified Magnified as "Look Around", credited solely to drummer Chris Slade. A studio version of "Big Betty" was recorded at the same sessions but remained unreleased until the 40th Anniversary box set in 2011.

== Ram Jam version ==
"Black Betty"

Single by Ram Jam

from the album Ram Jam
- B-side: "I Should Have Known"
- Released: March 14, 1977
- Recorded: February 1975
- Genre: Southern rock; stadium rock; disco-rock
- Length: 3:57 (album version); 2:32 (single version)
- Label: Epic
- Songwriters: Traditional; Huddie Ledbetter
- Producers: Jerry Kasenetz; Jeffry Katz

Ram Jam singles chronology
"Black Betty" (1977)	"Keep Your Hands on the Wheel" (1977)

Music video
- "Black Betty" on YouTube

Bill Bartlett had been in the Lemon Pipers and then formed a group called Starstruck. While in Starstruck, Bartlett took Lead Belly's 59-second long "Black Betty" and arranged, recorded and released it on the group's own TruckStar label. "Black Betty" became a regional hit. Producers Jerry Kasenetz and Jeffry Katz in New York formed a group around Bartlett called Ram Jam. They re-released the song, and it became a hit nationally. The Ram Jam version was actually the same one originally recorded by Starstruck (albeit significantly edited to rearrange the song structure). The song reached No. 18 on the singles charts in the United States and achieved more success in the United Kingdom and Australia reaching the top ten.

=== Formats and track listings ===
7-inch (1977)

1. "Black Betty" – 2:32
2. "I Should Have Known" – 4:45

7-inch (1989)

1. "Black Betty" (Rough 'n' Ready Remix – Edit) – 3:12
2. "Black Betty" (Original Version) – 3:56

12-inch (1989)

1. "Black Betty" (Rough 'n' Ready Remix) – 5:28
2. "Black Betty" (Original Version) – 3:56
3. "Black Betty" (Rough 'n' Ready Remix – Edit) – 3:12

CD (1989)

1. "Black Betty" (Rough 'n' Ready Remix – Edit) – 3:12
2. "Black Betty" (Original Version) – 3:56
3. "Black Betty" (Rough 'n' Ready Remix) – 5:28

CD (1989)

1. "Black Betty" – 2:29
2. "Let It All Out" – 4:00
3. "High Steppin'" – 3:41
4. "Hey Boogie Woman" – 3:09

12-inch (France, 1994)

1. "Black Betty" (Rough 'n' Ready Remix) – 5:28
2. "Black Betty" (Rough 'n' Ready Remix – Edit) – 3:12
3. "Black Betty" (Version Courte) – 2:32
4. "Black Betty" (Version Album) – 3:57
5. "Black Betty" (Rough 'n' Ready Remix) – 5:28
6. "Black Betty" (Rough 'n' Ready Remix – Edit) – 3:12
7. "Black Betty" (Version Courte) – 2:32
8. "Black Betty" (Version Album) – 3:57

CD (France, 1994)

1. "Black Betty" (Rough 'n' Ready Remix) – 5:28
2. "Black Betty" (Rough 'n' Ready Remix – Edit) – 3:12
3. "Black Betty" (Version Courte) – 2:32
4. "Black Betty" (Version Album) – 3:57

CD (France, 1994)

1. "Black Betty" (Version Courte) – 2:32
2. "Black Betty" (Version Album) – 3:57

=== Charts ===
==== Weekly charts ====
Chart (1977–1978)	Peak position
Australia (Kent Music Report)	3
Austria (Ö3 Austria Top 40)	23
Belgium (Ultratop 50 Flanders)	4
Canada Top Singles (RPM)	46
France (IFOP)	25
Germany (GfK)	25
Ireland (IRMA)	8
Netherlands (Dutch Top 40)	4
Netherlands (Single Top 100)	6
New Zealand (Recorded Music NZ)	8
Sweden (Sverigetopplistan)	14
UK Singles (Official Charts)	7
US Billboard Hot 100	18
US Cash Box Top 100	14

Chart (1984)	Peak position
France (SNEP)	27

Chart (1990) (Ben Liebrand Remix)	Peak position
Australia (ARIA)	17
Europe (European Hot 100 Singles)	23
Ireland (IRMA)	2
New Zealand (Recorded Music NZ)	7
UK Singles (Official Charts)	13
US Dance Club Songs (Billboard)	13
West Germany (GfK)	28

Chart (1994)	Peak position
Europe (European Hot 100 Singles)	22
France (SNEP)	2
Iceland (Íslenski Listinn Topp 40)	40

Chart (2007)	Peak position
UK Singles (OCC)	188

==== Year-end charts ====
Chart (1977)	Rank
New Zealand (RIANZ)	34
UK Singles (OCC)	56
US Cash Box Top 100	63

Chart (1978)	Rank
Australia (Kent Music Report)	31
Belgium (Ultratop 50 Flanders)	31
Netherlands (Dutch Top 40)	37
Netherlands (Single Top 100)	34

=== Certifications ===
Region	Certification	Certified units/sales
Canada (Music Canada)	Gold	75,000^{^}
Canada (Music Canada) Ringtone	Gold	20,000^{*}
France (SNEP)	Gold	500,000^{*}
United Kingdom (BPI)	Platinum	600,000^{‡}
^{*} Sales figures based on certification alone.^{^} Shipments figures based on certification alone.^{‡} Sales+streaming figures based on certification alone.

== Spiderbait version ==
"Black Betty"

Single by Spiderbait

from the album Tonight Alright
- B-side: "The Dog"; "In This City"
- Released: March 15, 2004
- Length: 3:26
- Label: Universal Music Australia
- Songwriters: Traditional; Huddie Ledbetter
- Producer: Sylvia Massy

Spiderbait singles chronology
"Arse Huggin' Pants" / "Bo Bo" (2002)	"Black Betty" (2004)	"Fucken Awesome" (2004)

Music video
- "Black Betty" on YouTube

In 2004, Australian alternative rock band Spiderbait released a hard rock version of "Black Betty" as the lead single from their sixth studio album, Tonight Alright, on March 15. Produced by Sylvia Massy, this version is a faster re-working of Ram Jam's arrangement. The song was a hit in Australia, reaching number one on the ARIA Singles Chart in May 2004 to become Spiderbait's first number-one single in their home country. The song was released as Spiderbait's debut single in the United States on October 18, 2004, reaching No. 32 on Billboard's Mainstream Rock Tracks chart in November of the same year. The music video features the band performing the song on a moving flatbed truck while a black 1936 Dodge roadster circles around them.

At the ARIA Music Awards of 2004, the song was nominated for Highest Selling Single and Best Video. Despite the song's success, Spiderbait's drummer, Kram, has considered their version of "Black Betty" a "fluke", as he wanted to perform three drum solos on the recording but was outvoted by the other band members.

In May 2024, Spiderbait announced a national tour celebrating 20 years of their version of "Black Betty", alongside their 2004 album Tonight Alright.

=== Track listing ===
Australian CD single (9816416)
No.	Title	Length
1.	"Black Betty" (edit)
2.	"Black Betty" (extended version)
3.	"The Dog"
4.	"In This City"

=== Charts ===
==== Weekly charts ====
Chart (2004)	Peak position
Australia (ARIA)	1
US Mainstream Rock Tracks (Billboard)	32

==== Year end charts ====
Chart (2004)	Position
Australia (ARIA)	3
Australian Artists (ARIA)	2

==== Decade-end charts ====
Chart (2000–2009)	Position
Australia (ARIA)	51
Australian Artists (ARIA)	9

=== Certifications ===
Region	Certification	Certified units/sales
Australia (ARIA)	2× Platinum	140,000^{^}
^{^} Shipments figures based on certification alone.

=== Release history ===
Region	Date	Format(s)	Label(s)	Ref.
Australia	March 15, 2004	CD	Universal Music Australia	
United Kingdom	August 16, 2004	7-inch vinyl; CD	Universal	
United States	October 18, 2004	Mainstream rock; active rock radio	Interscope	

== University of New Hampshire controversy ==
In 2006, the University of New Hampshire administration controversially banned the playing of Ram Jam's "Black Betty" at UNH hockey games. UNH Athletic Director Marty Scarano explained the reason for the decision: "UNH is not going to stand for something that insults any segment of society", misinterpreting the song as referring to an African-American woman named Betty.

In 2006, UNH students started the "Save Black Betty" campaign. Students protested at the hockey games by singing Ram Jam's "Black Betty", wearing T-shirts with writing on the front "Save Black Betty" and writing on the back "Bam-A-Lam", and holding up campaign posters at the game. The Ram Jam version was again played once at a UNH–UMaine hockey game on January 24, 2013, after a seven-year hiatus.

== Selected list of recorded versions ==
- 1933 James Baker (AKA Iron Head) and group
- 1939 Moses Platt (AKA Clear Rock)
- 1939 Huddie Ledbetter (AKA Lead Belly), originally on the 78 rpm album Negro Sinful Songs
- 1964 Odetta, as "Looky Yonder" on the album Odetta Sings of Many Things
- 1964 Alan Lomax, Texas Folk Songs album
- 1968 Manfred Mann, as "Big Betty" on the Mighty Garvey! album
- 1986 Nick Cave and the Bad Seeds on the album Kicking Against the Pricks
- 2002 Tom Jones UK No. 50 single, also on the UK No. 36 album Mr. Tom Jones
- 2007 Larkin Poe on the live album Jam in the Van
- 2012 Dinosaur Jr. on the japanese edition of the album I Bet on Sky
- 2012 Scooter on the album Music for a Big Night Out
- 2017 Caravan Palace no-album single

== See also ==
- Roud Folk Song Index
- List of 1970s one-hit wonders in the United States

== Bibliography ==
- Collins, Lewis. Historical Sketches of Kentucky. Cincinnati: James & Co. (1848).
- Thornton, Richard H. (ed.). An American Glossary. Philadelphia: J.B. Lippincott Company (1912).
