= Calypso (Spiderbait song) =

1997 single by Spiderbait

Single by Spiderbait

from the album Ivy and the Big Apples
- B-side: "Macintosharoonie Part One"; "Kermit's Legs"; "Dotted Line"
- Released: April 1997
- Studio: Studios 301
- Genre: Grunge; punk rock
- Length: 1:51
- Label: Polydor
- Songwriters: Janet English; Kram; Damian Whitty
- Producers: Phil McKellar; Spiderbait

Spiderbait singles chronology
| "Hot Water & Milk" (1996) | "Calypso" (1997) | "Joyce's Hut" / "Horschack Army" (1997) |

Music video
- "Calypso" on YouTube

"Calypso" is a song by Australian alternative rock band Spiderbait. It was released in April 1997 as the third single from the band's third studio album, Ivy and the Big Apples (1996). Subtitled "and Other Tunes for Lovers" on its CD single, "Calypso" peaked at number 13 on the Australian ARIA Singles Chart, and it was ranked number 23 on Triple J's Hottest 100 for 1997. At the ARIA Music Awards of 1997, the song was nominated for Best Video, losing out to "Feelin' Kinda Sporty" by Dave Graney & the Coral Snakes.

== Reception ==
Junkee said, "its main verse riff is essentially "Blitzkreig Bop" with a J Mascis makeover, while Janet English's code-switching vocals add a rousing sense of joy to proceedings. While Australian pop-punk may not be the house that Spiderbait built, they certainly still helped to put bricks in the wall." In 2025, the song ranked 95 on Triple J Hottest 100 of Australian Songs.

== Track listing ==
Australian CD single
| No. | Title | Length |
|---|---|---|
| 1. | "Calypso" | 1:51 |
| 2. | "Macintosharoonie Part One" | 2:53 |
| 3. | "Kermit's Legs" | 2:56 |
| 4. | "Dotted Line" | 0:37 |

== Charts ==
=== Weekly charts ===
| Chart (1997) | Peak position |
|---|---|
| Australia (ARIA) | 13 |

=== Year-end charts ===
| Chart (1997) | Rank |
|---|---|
| Australia (ARIA) | 98 |

== Release history ==
| Region | Date | Format | Label | Catalogue |
|---|---|---|---|---|
| Australia | April 1997 | CD single | Polydor | 573815-2 |
