= The Unfinished Spanish Galleon of Finley Lake =

Studio album by Spiderbait
- Released: 25 September 1995
- Recorded: September 1994 – March 1995
- Studios: Birdland Studios, Melbourne; ABC Studios, Sydney; Rockinghorse Studios, Byron Bay
- Genres: Punk rock; alternative rock; noise pop; grunge
- Length: 37:22
- Label: Polydor/Universal
- Producer: Spiderbait

Spiderbait chronology
Run (1993)	The Unfinished Spanish Galleon of Finley Lake (1995)	Ivy and the Big Apples (1996)

Singles from The Unfinished Spanish Galleon of Finley Lake
- 1. "Jesus / Home" Released: 7 November 1994; 2. "Monty" Released: 28 August 1995; 3. "I Gotta Know" Released: 11 December 1995; 4. "Sam Gribbles" Released: April 1996

The Unfinished Spanish Galleon of Finley Lake is the second studio album by Australian rock band Spiderbait, released in 1995. It peaked at No. 14 on the ARIA Albums Charts.

The album was named after the real unfinished Spanish galleon built in Spiderbait's hometown, Finley, New South Wales, which was a "failed civic beautification project".

The Unfinished Spanish Galleon Of Finley Lake did well for the band, picking up two ARIA nominations and drawing industry attention.

== Reception ==
Professional ratings
Review scores
Source	Rating
AllMusic	3/5 stars

Emma MacDonald of The Canberra Times opined, in October 1995, that "the music is inventive and quite melodic but, be warned, what seems like a nice musical jaunt at first can turn into a thrashing, speaker-blowing experience without the slightest warning." Australian musicologist Ian McFarlane felt it "found the band adding a jazzier touch (as on the title track) to the usually frantic, distortion-fuelled thrash-pop style." Jonathan Lewis of AllMusic wrote that it "consisted of short (most songs are under three minutes) blasts of punk-pop," adding that "[w]ith their buzzing guitars and the strange vocals of lead singer Kram, Spiderbait were a kind of hybrid of the rawer moments of the Pixies and the Muffs, but less melodic than either of those two."

== Track listing ==
All songs are written by Spiderbait (Kram, Janet English and Damian Whitty)

No.	Title	Length
1.	"I Gotta Know"	2:03
2.	"Sam Gribbles"	2:28
3.	"Monty"	2:34
4.	"Who Are the Freemasons?"	3:21
5.	"Riot"	3:18
6.	"Spanish Galleon"	2:58
7.	"Jesus"	1:51
8.	"Chuck Picola"	1:22
9.	"Yeah O Yeah"	1:09
10.	"Ooga Booga"	2:58
11.	"Goal"	2:32
12.	"Detective"	10:48

- "Detective" ends at 3:20. After 5 minutes of silence (3:20 – 8:20) begins an untitled hidden track: it's a section, where instructional audio on tabla playing is accompanied by a MIDI track reminiscent of a Casio keyboard tune.

== Charts ==
Chart (1995/96)	Peak position
Australian Albums (ARIA)	14

== Release history ==
Country	Release date	Format	Label	Catalogue	Ref.
Australia	25 September 1995	CD	Polydor	529 155-2	
Australia	25 September 1995	Cassette	Polydor	529 155-4	
Worldwide	4 December 2020	Digital download	Universal	—N/a	
Australia	24 October 2025	LP	Universal	7801242	
