= Glokenpop =

2000 single by Spiderbait

Single by Spiderbait

from the album Grand Slam
- Released: January 2000
- Studio: Q, Studios 301 (Sydney, Australia)
- Length: 3:19
- Label: Polydor
- Songwriters: Janet English; Mark Maher; Damian Whitty
- Producer: Phil McKellar

Spiderbait singles chronology
| "Plastic" (1999) | "Glokenpop" (2000) | "Four on the Floor" (2001) |

Music video
- "Glokenpop" on YouTube

"Glokenpop" (also spelt "Glockenpop") is a song by Australian alternative rock band Spiderbait and was released in January 2000 as the fourth and final single from the band's fourth studio album, Grand Slam (1999). "Glokenpop" peaked at number 80 on the Australian Singles Chart. At the ARIA Music Awards of 2000, the song was nominated for Best Pop Release, losing to "Spinning Around" by Kylie Minogue, while Janet English won the ARIA Award for Best Cover Art for the single's cover art. The song is included in the 2009 video game LittleBigPlanet for PlayStation Portable.

== Track listing ==
Australian CD single
| No. | Title | Length |
|---|---|---|
| 1. | "Glockenpop" (album version) |
| 2. | "Cracker" (Endorphin remix) |
| 3. | "Dinnertime" (Hardboiled remix) |
| 4. | "Glockenpop" (Slow Ectoplasm remix) |
| 5. | "White Trash Superstar" (Pound System remix) |
| 6. | "Jellybean Drifter" (Whitt remix) |

== Charts ==
| Chart (2000) | Peak position |
|---|---|
| Australia (ARIA) | 80 |

== Release history ==
| Region | Date | Format | Label | Catalogue | Ref. |
|---|---|---|---|---|---|
| Australia | January 2000 | CD | Polydor | 156695-2 | |
