= Monty (song) =

1995 single by Spiderbait

Single by Spiderbait

from the album The Unfinished Spanish Galleon of Finley Lake
- Released: 28 August 1995
- Studio: Birdland
- Length: 2:34
- Label: Polydor
- Producer: Spiderbait

Spiderbait singles chronology
"Jesus" / "Home" (1994)	"Monty" (1995)	"I Gotta Know" (1995)

Music video
- "Monty" on YouTube

"Monty" is a song by Australian alternative rock band Spiderbait, released in August 1995 as the second single from the band's second studio album, The Unfinished Spanish Galleon of Finley Lake. The single became the band's first charting single, peaking at number 44 on the Australian ARIA Singles Chart. The song ranked in at number 43 on Triple J's Hottest 100 in 1995. The single includes a demo of the song "Jesus", which was originally released as a 7-inch single.

== Track listings ==
Australian CD single
No.	Title	Length
1.	"Monty"
2.	"We Came to See the Other Band Play"
3.	"Jesus" (demo)

== Charts ==
Chart (1995)	Peak position
Australia (ARIA)	44

== Release history ==
Region	Date	Format(s)	Label	Ref.
Australia	28 August 1995	CD Single	Polydor	
