= Fucken Awesome =

Single by Spiderbait

from the album Tonight Alright
- Released: June 2004
- Label: Universal Music Australia
- Songwriter: Spiderbait
- Producer: Sylvia Massy

Spiderbait singles chronology
"Black Betty" (2004)	"Fucken Awesome" (2004)	"Straight Through the Sun" (2013)

Music video
- "Fucken Awesome" on YouTube

"Fucken Awesome" is a song by Australian alternative rock band Spiderbait. The song was released in June 2004 as the second and final single from the band's sixth studio album Tonight Alright. The single peaked at number 30 on the Australian chart. The song ranked at number 20 on Triple J's Hottest 100 in 2004.

== Track listings ==
Australian CD Single
No.	Title	Length
1.	"Fucken Awesome"
2.	"Fucken Awesome" (Karaoke Version)
3.	"Riffer" (Demo)
4.	"Riffer" (Demo)
5.	"Black Betty" (Extended Version)

== Charts ==
Chart (2004)	Peak position
Australia (ARIA)	30

== Release history ==
Region	Date	Format	Label	Catalogue
Australia	June 2004	CD Single	Universal Music Australia	9820670
