= The Flight of Wally Funk =

Studio album by Spiderbait
- Released: 1 October 2001
- Recorded: November and December 2000
- Studio: Whitt's House (Australia); Black Box (Brisbane); Sing Sing (Melbourne); Rockinghorse (Coorabell)
- Length: 59:59
- Label: Universal Australia
- Producer: Magoo

Spiderbait chronology
Grand Slam (1999)	The Flight of Wally Funk (2001)	Tonight Alright (2004)

Singles from The Flight of Wally Funk
- 1. "Four on the Floor" Released: August 2001; 2. "Outta My Head" Released: November 2001; 3. "Arse Huggin' Pants"/"Bo Bo" Released: 2002

The Flight of Wally Funk is the fifth studio album by Australian rock band Spiderbait. Named after female aviator Wally Funk, the album was released in October 2001 and peaked at number 34 on the ARIA charts.

== Track listing ==
No.	Title	Length
1.	"Dirty"	2:50
2.	"Outta My Head"	2:32
3.	"Tremolo"	4:16
4.	"A.D.D."	3:56
5.	"Pack It Up"	3:40
6.	"Rumble in the Tummy"	4:43
7.	"The Last One"	2:10
8.	"Six Bar Central"	2:18
9.	"Bo Bo"	3:31
10.	"Arse Huggin' Pants"	5:06
11.	"Vilas"	3:22
12.	"Parking Lot"	3:07
13.	"Four on the Floor"	3:07
14.	"The Mob Has Spoken"	3:12
15.	"Inner Ear Infection"	4:00
16.	"Laptop Jam"	3:13
17.	"Most Boys Suck"	1:42
18.	"Ballad of Whitby Farm"	3:14

== Charts ==
Chart (2001)	Peak position
Australian Albums (ARIA)	34

== Release history ==
Country	Release date	Format	Label	Catalogue
Australia	1 October 2001	CD	Universal	547349-2
