= Tonight Alright =

- Primary cover art featuring a silhouette of bassist Janet English

Studio album by Spiderbait
- Released: 28 March 2004
- Recorded: 2003
- Studios: RadioStar (Weed, California); Metropolis (Melbourne)
- Genres: Alternative rock; hard rock; garage rock revival; power pop
- Length: 36:25
- Label: Universal Australia
- Producer: Sylvia Massy

Spiderbait chronology
The Flight of Wally Funk (2001)	Tonight Alright (2004)	Greatest Hits (2005)

Alternate cover
- Alternate cover art featuring a silhouette of guitarist Damian Whitty

Singles from Tonight Alright
- 1. "Black Betty" Released: March 2004; 2. "Fucken Awesome" Released: June 2004

Tonight Alright is the sixth studio album by Australian alternative rock band Spiderbait, released on 28 March 2004 through Universal Music Australia. It was primarily recorded in Weed, California, by producer Sylvia Massy. It peaked at number 14 on the ARIA Albums Chart and was certified gold. "Black Betty", a hard rock cover of the Lead Belly song, served as the album's lead single and became Spiderbait's first number-one hit in Australia. The song also appeared on the soundtracks for the 2004 film Without a Paddle and the racing video game Need for Speed: Underground 2. In May 2024, Spiderbait announced a national tour celebrating 20 years of Tonight Alright (and their version of Black Betty). Alongside the announcement of the tour, they announced that the album's going to be issued on vinyl for the first time.

Professional ratings
Review scores
Source	Rating
AllMusic	3.5/5 stars
Music Emissions	favourable
Slant Magazine	3/5 stars

== Track listing ==
No.	Title	Length
1.	"Take Me Back"	4:40
2.	"Live in a Box"	3:17
3.	"Black Betty"	3:28
4.	"Put It Down"	2:41
5.	"Fucken Awesome"	2:24
6.	"5th Set"	3:28
7.	"The Dog"	1:34
8.	"Cows"	2:21
9.	"Tonite"	4:26
10.	"Alright"	2:18
11.	"In This City"	1:27
12.	"Picky"	4:25

== Charts ==
=== Weekly charts ===
Chart (2004)	Peak position
Australian Albums (ARIA)	14

=== Year-end charts ===
Chart (2004)	Rank
Australian Albums Chart	65
Australian Artist Albums Chart	16

== Certifications ==
Region	Certification	Certified units/sales
Australia (ARIA)	Gold	35,000^{^}
^{^} Shipments figures based on certification alone.

== Release history ==
Country	Release date	Format	Label	Catalogue	Ref.
Australia	March 2004	CD	Universal Music Australia	9817558	
Europe	2004	CD	Universal Music Australia	602498175583	
Canada	2004	CD	Universal Music Australia	0249817558	
United States	17 August 2004	CD	Interscope Records	B0003218-02	
Australia	26 July 2024	LP	Universal Music	6500068	
