= Buy Me a Pony =

Single by Spiderbait

from the album Ivy and the Big Apples
- Released: September 1996
- Studio: Studios 301
- Length: 1:44
- Label: Polydor
- Songwriters: Janet English; Kram; Damian Whitty
- Producers: Phil McKellar; Spiderbait

Spiderbait singles chronology
"Sam Gribbles" (1996)	"Buy Me a Pony" (1996)	"Hot Water & Milk" (1996)

Music video
- "Buy Me a Pony" on YouTube

"Buy Me a Pony" is a song by Australian alternative rock band, Spiderbait and was released in September 1996 as the lead single from the band's third studio album Ivy and the Big Apples. "Buy Me a Pony" peaked at number 45 on the Australian chart.

== Details ==
The track satirises the initial enthusiasm a label has for a band, and its subsequent reversal, inspired in part by the bidding war that took place to sign Spiderbait. In a 2016 interview, Kram said the song, "was kind of like a comic book version of how bad it can be, and the song still resonates with people today. But the label loved it, even though it was about them and everyone else - they had enough of a sense of humour to get it."

== Reception ==
At the ARIA Music Awards of 1997, the song was nominated for Single of the Year, losing out to "Truly Madly Deeply" by Savage Garden.

The song ranked at number 1 on Triple J's Hottest 100 in 1996. It was the first song by an Australian artist to top the charts. Triple J Music Director Richard Kingsmill said, "After three years of doing year-specific Hottest 100s we were still sitting back waiting for an Australian song to reach number one, and we were thinking, 'Oh, it's still years away for a Hottest 100 song that's Australian'. But it wasn't!" It was also the shortest song to ever win.

== Track listings ==
Australian CD Single
No.	Title	Length
1.	"Buy Me a Pony"
2.	"Should Have Done What My Mum Always Told Me To"
3.	"The Road to Urana"
4.	"Beauregard Bennett"

== Charts ==
Chart (1996/97)	Peak position
Australia (ARIA)	45

== Release history ==
Region	Date	Format	Label	Catalogue
Australia	September 1996	CD Single	Polydor Records	5757572
