= Grand Slam (Spiderbait album) =

Studio album by Spiderbait
- Released: 12 April 1999
- Recorded: 1998
- Studio: Q; 301
- Genre: Alternative rock; post-grunge; electronica
- Length: 45:23
- Label: Polydor
- Producer: Phil McKellar

Spiderbait chronology
Live in Canada and Australia!! (1997)	Grand Slam (1999)	The Flight of Wally Funk (2001)

Singles from Grand Slam
- 1. "Shazam!" Released: 28 February 1999; 2. "Stevie" Released: May 1999; 3. "Plastic" Released: September 1999; 4. "Glokenpop" Released: 24 January 2000

Professional ratings
Review scores
Source	Rating
Air	favourable
AllMusic	4/5 stars
CLUAS	favourable

Grand Slam is the fourth studio album by Australian rock band Spiderbait. The album marked a significant change in sound for the band, with many of the songs being heavily produced pop sung by bassist Janet English. The remainder of the album is a mix of alternative rock (sung, as on previous albums, by drummer Kram) and electronica.

The song "Glokenpop" (also spelt "Glockenpop") is featured in the 2009 video game LittleBigPlanet for PlayStation Portable.

== Track listing ==
No.	Title	Length
1.	"Cracker"	3:06
2.	"Glokenpop"	3:19
3.	"Shazam!"	2:03
4.	"Dinnertime"	2:11
5.	"Plastic"	2:31
6.	"Bessy's Last Journey"	3:17
7.	"Daisy May"	1:58
8.	"White Trash Superstar"	3:27
9.	"Buster"	2:13
10.	"By the Time I Get to Howlong"	1:59
11.	"Stevie"	3:00
12.	"Jellybean Drifter"	2:45
13.	"King of the Northern"	2:12
14.	"Tallygaroopna"	1:13
15.	"Ultralite"	4:01
16.	"Lickety Split"	2:45
17.	"Lost in Adelaide"	3:22

== Charts ==
Chart (1999)	Peak position
Australian Albums (ARIA)	10

== Certifications ==
Region	Certification	Certified units/sales
Australia (ARIA)	Gold	35,000^{^}
^{^} Shipments figures based on certification alone.

== Release history ==
Country	Release date	Format	Label	Catalogue
Australia	April 1999	CD	Polydor	547349-2
Australia	August 2019	LP	Grudge	7745085
