= Shazam! (Spiderbait song) =

1999 single by Spiderbait

Single by Spiderbait

from the album Grand Slam
- B-side: "Conversation"; "Dark Fader"; "Fizzy Drinks"
- Released: 28 February 1999
- Studio: Q, Studios 301 (Sydney, Australia)
- Length: 2:07
- Label: Polydor
- Songwriters: Janet English; Kram; Damian Whitty
- Producers: Spiderbait; Phil McKellar

Spiderbait singles chronology
"Joyce's Hut" / "Horschack Army" (1997)	"Shazam!" (1999)	"Stevie" (1999)

Music video
- "Shazam!" on YouTube

"Shazam!" is a song by Australian alternative rock band Spiderbait, released on 28 February 1999 as the lead single from the band's fourth studio album, Grand Slam. "Shazam!" peaked at number 44 on the Australian ARIA Singles Chart and was ranked at number 40 on Triple J's Hottest 100 of 1999.

== Track listing ==
Australian CD single
No.	Title	Length
1.	"Shazam!"	2:07
2.	"Conversation"	2:26
3.	"Dark Fader"	1:12
4.	"Fizzy Drinks"	2:16

== Charts ==
Chart (1999)	Peak position
Australia (ARIA)	46
