= Spiderbait =

Australian rock band

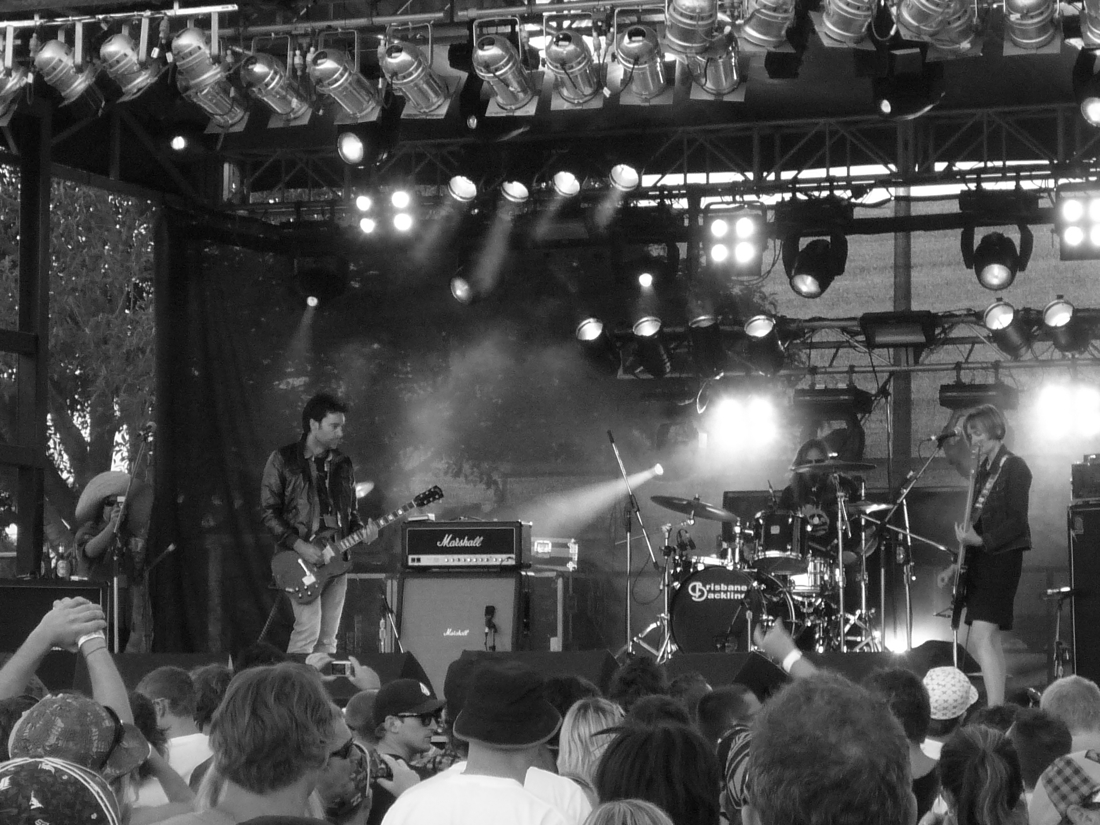
- Spiderbait in 2009

Background information
- Also known as: Candy Spuds, Spiderbaby
- Origin: Finley, New South Wales, Australia
- Genres: Alternative rock; hard rock; grunge; electropop
- Years active: 1989–present
- Labels: Au-Go-Go; Polydor; Interscope; Universal Australia
- Members: Janet English; Kram; Damian Whitty
- Website: spiderbait.net.au

Spiderbait is an Australian alternative rock band from Finley, New South Wales, formed in 1989 by bass guitarist and singer Janet English, drummer and singer Kram, and guitarist Whitt (Damian Whitty). In 2004, the group's cover version of the 1939 Lead Belly song "Black Betty" reached number one on the ARIA Singles Chart. They have five top 20 albums: The Unfinished Spanish Galleon of Finley Lake (1995), Ivy and the Big Apples (1996), Grand Slam (1999), Tonight Alright (2004), and Greatest Hits (2005). The group have won two ARIA Music Awards with the first in 1997 as 'Best Alternative Release' for Ivy and the Big Apples and the second in 2000 as 'Best Cover-Art' for their single "Glockenpop". In November 2013, the band released its first studio album in nine years, Spiderbait. Spiderbait have released seven albums, all achieving gold status or more. At the 2026 ARIA Music Awards, they were inducted into the ARIA Hall of Fame.

== History ==
=== 1989–1994: Early years ===
In 1989, Janet English on bass guitar and lead vocals, Mark Maher (better known as Kram) on lead vocals and drums, and Whitt (Damian Whitty) on guitar, began performing together. All grew up in the small town of Finley in southern New South Wales where Kram and his second cousin Whitt jammed together as schoolboys. With English on board, early rehearsals were held in sheds or barns, Kram later recalled: "we were shithouse! We were so bad ... I mean Janet had never played a note of music in her life". Kram taught English to play bass. Initial gigs included a friend's party as an unnamed band where they played "Freak Scene" and an AC/DC song. They performed at the combined 21st birthday party for Kram and Whitt under the name Candy Spuds. They used that name for only one gig and then used Spiderbaby.

In 1990, the trio moved to Melbourne, where Kram was studying at the Victorian College of the Arts School of Music. They soon became part of Melbourne's punk scene, playing gigs at venues like The Tote Hotel in Collingwood. Fellow alternative rockers The Meanies were an early influence and helped the band get gigs and a recording contract. They signed with Au-Go-Go Records and were renamed as Spiderbait – Spiderbaby was already being used by an American band. Spiderbait released their first single, "Circle K", in 1991. A seven-track EP titled P'tang Yang Kipper Bang Uh! (named after the 1982 Michael Apted telemovie, P'tang, Yang, Kipperbang) followed in January 1992, displaying the thrash-like hardcore punk of their early live gigs. During 1992 they supported United States groups Rollins Band and Beastie Boys on their tour of Australia.

Spiderbait's first album, Shashavaglava, was released in February 1993. 'Šašava glava' (written as Шашава Глава) means 'crazy head' in Serbian or possibly 'dickhead'. The album included all the tracks from P'tang Yang Kipper Bang Uh! and featured the songs "Old Man Sam", in which the film clip featured Kram's brother Adam doing donuts in his car and Kram's Grandpa, and a cover of English comedians The Goodies' song "Run". Allmusic's David Colon found the album "agitating" where its "thrashing and pounding may be meant to energize, but in the end, only enervates." "Run" was released as a CD single in November 1993 and was followed by "Jesus". The group supported US band Primus on their Australia 1994 tour.

=== 1995–1998: Major-label-signing, Ivy & The Big Apples and side-projects ===
In 1995, Spiderbait was signed to Polydor Records by Craig Kamber - who also worked with Powderfinger and Underground Lovers - and released its second album, The Unfinished Spanish Galleon of Finley Lake, in October. The album reached number 14 on the Australian charts, with singles "Monty" (September) and "Jesus" receiving extensive airplay on radio station Triple J. The album title refers to a then-unfinished project by the Finley community, an artificial lake that included a replica sailing ship. Spiderbait played to predominantly under-18 audiences. At the ARIA Music Awards of 1996, the album received two nominations: 'Best Alternative Release', and 'Best Cover Art' for English and George Stajsic.

Their third album, Ivy and the Big Apples, was issued in October 1996 and reached number 3, and by 1997 had received 2× Platinum certification by Australian Recording Industry Association (ARIA) for shipments of over 140,000 units in Australia. Their next single, "Buy Me a Pony", received extensive airplay on Triple J, resulting in listeners voting it as their favourite song in the Hottest 100 of 1996 – making Spiderbait the first Australian group to achieve this. In October 1996, the group toured Canada and played gigs in Los Angeles, New York, and Seattle in the US. The album's third single, "Calypso", also achieved commercial airplay, and reached number 13 in the ARIA Singles Chart in June 1997. It was featured in the 1999 film 10 Things I Hate About You during the scene where the character of Kat (played by Julia Stiles) is reading the novel The Bell Jar by Sylvia Plath. At the ARIA Music Awards of 1997 the group received seven nominations, but with Savage Garden dominating the ceremony and winning ten awards, Spiderbait only captured the 'Best Alternative Release' category for Ivy and the Big Apples.

In early 1998, English and her then-boyfriend Quan Yeomans (of Regurgitator) formed a side-project, Happyland (originally called The Shits), which released their only album, Welcome to Happyland, on Polydor in September. English provided cover art work and 3-D animated videos for Regurgitator releases. By 2000 the couple and Happyland had split. Also in 1998, Kram and Richie Lewis of Tumbleweed formed a side-project, Hot Rollers – so named as both member's mothers were hairdressers. Their only album, The Hot Rollers, was issued in July through Polydor.

=== 1999–2004: Grand Slam to Tonight alright ===
Spiderbait reconvened in June 1998 to record the album Grand Slam. They toured Japan in October 1998 and supported the Beastie Boys in February 1999. The album, produced by Paul McKercher (who had also produced You Am I and Cold Chisel), was issued in April, and debuted at number 10. "Shazam!" was released as a single in February, which reached the top 50. It was featured in a 2001 episode of Sex and the City entitled "The Real Me" as part of a fashion show scene. In 2009, it was used in promotional advertising for the A-League. At the ARIA Music Awards of 1999 the group received five nominations.

Despite good airplay for the Grand Slam singles "Stevie" (May) and "Glokenpop" (January 2000), neither charted in the top 50. At the ARIA Music Awards of 2000 the group received two nominations and English won 'Best Cover Art' for her work on "Glokenpop". Their 2001 dance-influenced album The Flight of Wally Funk was less successful than their previous three albums, although it reached the Top 40. It was recorded mostly in Whitty's living room.

Spiderbait recorded the Tonight Alright album in Weed, CA with engineers Josh Kiser and Richard Veltrop, producer Sylvia Massy (Red Hot Chili Peppers, R.E.M., Tool, System of a Down, Skunk Anansie). The songs had been written and demoed at Whitty's home in North Melbourne with English and Kram cycling in from nearby suburbs. The album's first single, "Black Betty", was released in early March 2004. It was a cover version of the 1939 Lead Belly song, which was a hit in 1977, when covered by Ram Jam. Spiderbait's version reached number one after 10 weeks in the singles chart in May 2004, and stayed there for three weeks, becoming their biggest selling single ever. By the end of the year, "Black Betty" received 2× Platinum certification. In the US, it reached the top 40 on Billboard's Mainstream Rock Singles Chart. The film clip featured a hot rod similar to the car on the cover of the ZZ Top album Eliminator. The song also made the soundtrack to the Electronic Arts video games Need for Speed: Underground 2 and Need for Speed: Underground Rivals for the PSP.

Tonight Alright was released in March 2004 and debuted at number 14 on the ARIA Albums Chart. The second single, "Fucken Awesome", reached the top 30 in June. From May, the group toured supporting Hoodoo Gurus, followed by their own tour to United Kingdom and US. Interscope Records signed the band in 2004 to distribute Tonight Alright in the US and UK. At the ARIA Music Awards of 2004, Kram performed as part of the super-group The Wrights, which also featured members of Powderfinger, The Living End, You Am I, Jet, Grinspoon, and Dallas Crane.

=== 2005–2012: On hiatus and touring ===
In March 2005, English gave birth to a daughter. In September, Spiderbait released a compilation album, Greatest Hits, which debuted at number 6. According to their official website, they had discovered that newer fans were unaware of their material before "Black Betty".

In October 2005, Spiderbait performed at Rod Laver Arena in Melbourne, as part of the Coca-Cola Live'n'Local Tour '05. In November 2006, the band performed at the "Queensland Council of Unions"-organized Rock the Vote! concert in Brisbane.

The band recorded a cover of "Ghost Riders in the Sky" as the main theme for the film Ghost Rider (2007), starring Nicolas Cage. A small excerpt is played during the film, and then in its entirety as the first song when the credits roll. The band's song "Glokenpop" is featured in the 2009 game LittleBigPlanet for the PlayStation Portable. Kram released his debut solo album, Mix Tape, in March 2009. In 2010, Magnapop's album Chase Park featured a cover of Spiderbait's song "Jesus" from The Unfinished Spanish Galleon of Finley Lake. In December of that year, they supported Guns N' Roses at a Sydney gig. The band recorded a cover of "Rock-a-Bye Your Bear" for the compilation ReWiggled - A Tribute to the Wiggles.

=== 2013–2021: End of hiatus and self-titled album ===
In an interview with Triple J in February 2013, Kram announced that Spiderbait were in the studio, working on their first album in seven years, saying, "We're doing a new record, and we're about halfway through. We're just writing demos at the moment, and it's coming along well. We're back in our Motorhead and Metallica metal phase—I'm all double kick at the moment."

The self-titled album, Spiderbait, was released on 15 November 2013. The band played a gig on the same day, for the opening night of the Jam Gallery, a new music venue in Bondi Junction.

=== 2022-present: Sounds in the Key of J and touring ===
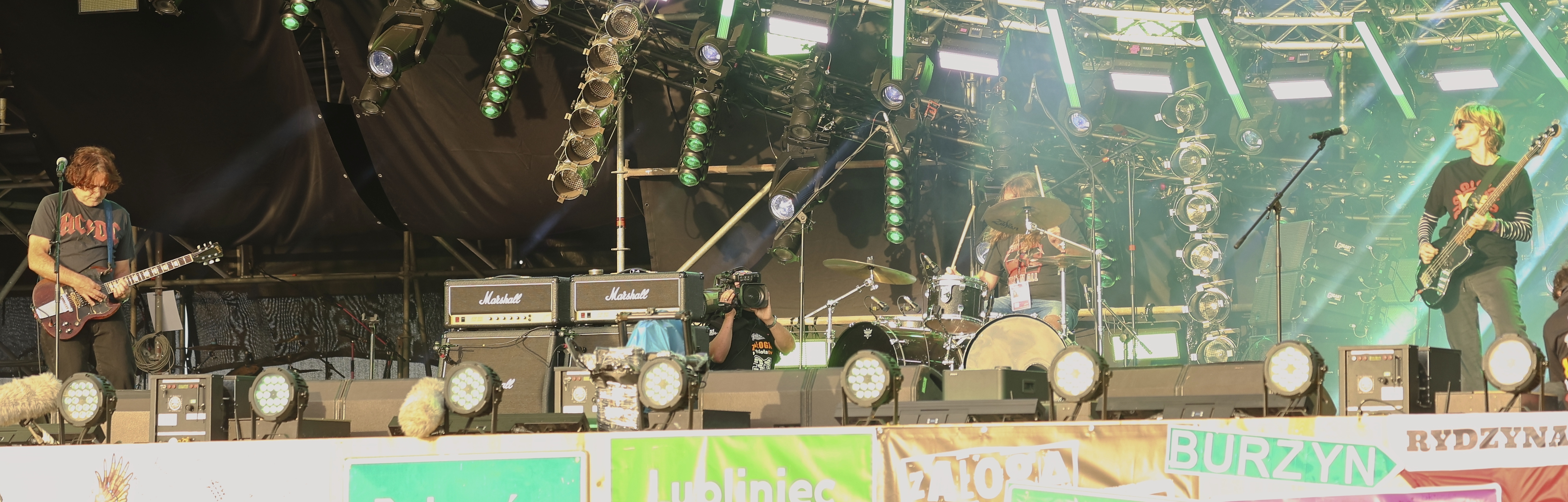
At the Pol'and'Rock Festival 2025

On 11 March 2022, the band released "My Car's a UFO", their first new song in nine years. The track was initially recorded for The Flight of Wally Funk and served as the lead single from the band's third compilation album, Sounds in the Key of J which collects every Spiderbait song that Janet English sings lead vocals on. The compilation was released on 8 April 2022, with a supporting tour that followed that July.

On 17 June 2023, Spiderbait performed their first show in the U.S. in over 25 years in New York City at the Aussie BBQ Festival. Other acts that were there were Amy Shark and Budjerah. In December 2023, Spiderbait performed at Good Things, alongside other bands like Limp Bizkit, Devo, Fall Out Boy and more.

On 15 May 2024, Spiderbait announced that they would tour Australia from August to October of that year to celebrate the 20th anniversary of Black Betty, with opening acts like Polish Club, Adalita, Private Function, Abbe May and local bands.

On 20 September 2024, the band released Bunch of Bettys, an extended play full of different recordings of Black Betty, such as Live Betty (recorded at the Tivoli in Brisbane on 31 March 2017), Demo Betty, 4-Track Betty, Barn Betty, Fuzzy Betty, Acoustic Betty and the original cover from Tonight Alright.

In April 2026, Spiderbait announced a national Australian tour to commemorate the 30th anniversary of their 1996 breakthrough album, Ivy & The Big Apples. The tour commenced in July 2026, featuring performances of the album in its entirety across major cities including Brisbane, Perth, Melbourne, Adelaide, Canberra, Sydney, and Newcastle. Due to demand, additional regional encore shows were later scheduled for October and November 2026. The tour featured a rotating lineup of 1990s Australian alternative rock peers as special guests, including Custard, Magic Dirt, The Meanies, and Tumbleweed, alongside Melbourne band The Gnomes. To coincide with the tour, a 30th-anniversary vinyl reissue of Ivy & The Big Apples was released on July 3, 2026.

== Discography ==
- Shashavaglava (1993)
- The Unfinished Spanish Galleon of Finley Lake (1995)
- Ivy and the Big Apples (1996)
- Grand Slam (1999)
- The Flight of Wally Funk (2001)
- Tonight Alright (2004)
- Spiderbait (2013)

== Members ==
- Janet English – lead vocals, bass, occasional guitar and drums
- Mark "Kram" Maher – lead vocals, drums, occasional guitar
- Damian "Whitt" Whitty – guitar, programming, backing and occasional lead vocals

== Awards and nominations ==
=== ARIA Awards ===
The ARIA Music Awards is an annual awards ceremony that recognises excellence, innovation, and achievement across all genres of Australian music. They commenced in 1987. Spiderbait have won two awards from 19 nominations for Australian Recording Industry Association (ARIA) Awards.

At the 2026 ARIA Music Awards, Spiderbait were inducted in the ARIA Hall of Fame.

Year	Nominee / work	Award	Result
1996	The Unfinished Spanish Galleon of Finley Lake	Best Alternative Release	Nominated
1996	The Unfinished Spanish Galleon of Finley Lake – Janet English, George Stajsic	Best Cover Art	Nominated
1997	Ivy and the Big Apples	Album of the Year	Nominated
1997	Ivy and the Big Apples	Best Alternative Release	Won
1997	Ivy and the Big Apples	Best Group	Nominated
1997	Ivy and the Big Apples – Janet English	Best Cover Art	Nominated
1997	Ivy and the Big Apples – Phil McKellar	Engineer of the Year	Nominated
1997	"Buy Me a Pony"	Single of the Year	Nominated
1997	"Calypso" – Janet English	Best Video	Nominated
1999	Grand Slam	Album of the Year	Nominated
1999	Grand Slam	Best Alternative Release	Nominated
1999	Grand Slam – Janet English, George Stajsic	Best Cover Art	Nominated
1999	Grand Slam – Phil McKellar	Engineer of the Year	Nominated
1999	Grand Slam – Phil McKellar	Producer of the Year	Nominated
2000	"Glokenpop"	Best Pop Release	Nominated
2000	"Glockenpop"– Janet English	Best Cover Art	Won
2004	Tonight Alright	Best Rock Album	Nominated
2004	"Black Betty"	Highest Selling Single	Nominated
2004	"Black Betty" – Paul Butler, Scott Walton (50/50)	Best Video	Nominated
2026	Themselves	ARIA Hall of Fame	inducted
