= 2018 Commonwealth Games opening ceremony =

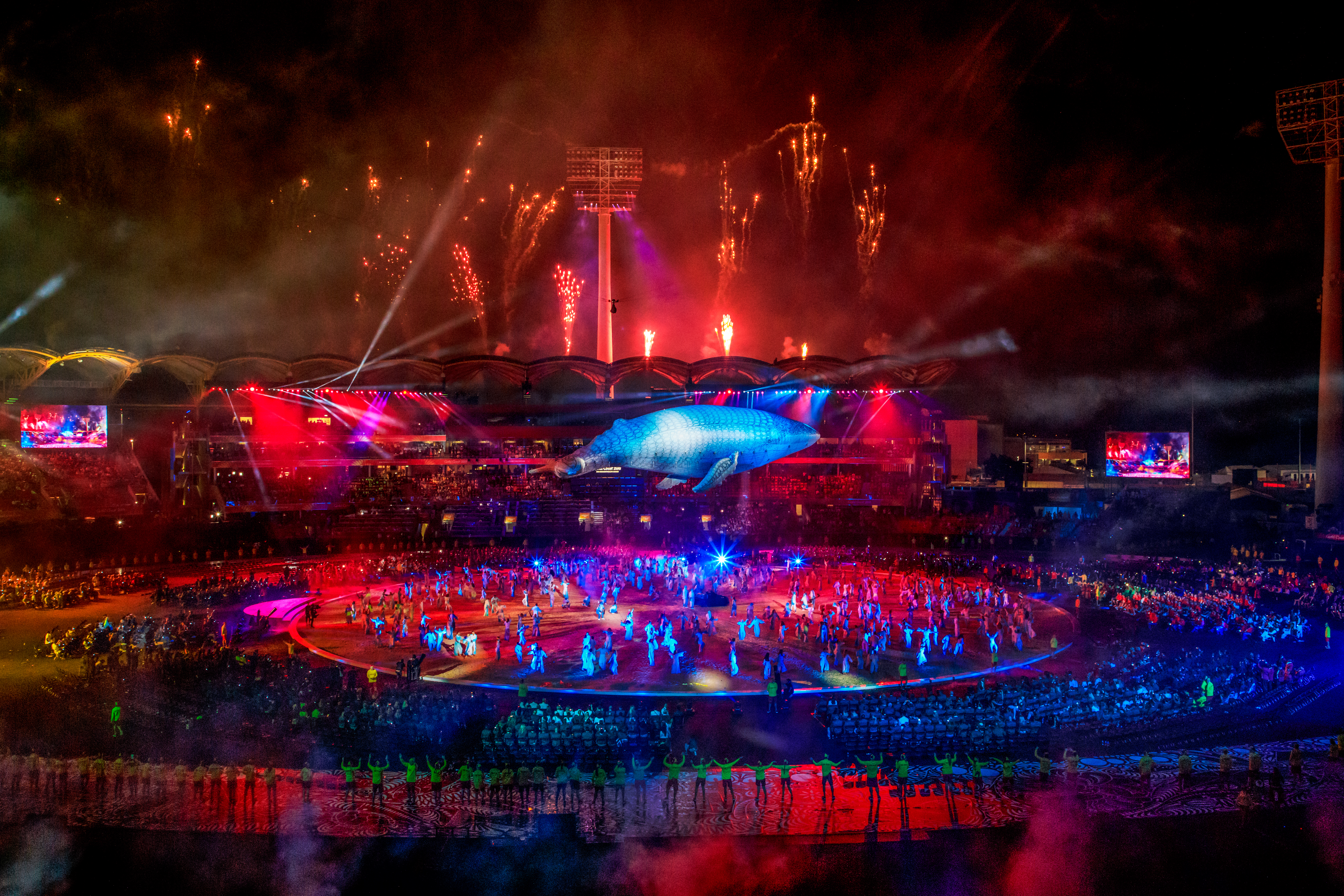
- Date: 4 April 2018
- Time: 20:00 – 23:00 AEST
- Location: Gold Coast, Australia; 28°00′23″S 153°22′2″E
- Also known as: Hello Earth
- Filmed by: NEP Australia; Seven Network (NEN)

The opening ceremony for the 2018 Commonwealth Games took place on the evening of Wednesday 4 April in the Carrara Stadium, Gold Coast. As mandated by the Commonwealth Games Charter, the proceedings of the ceremony combined the formal opening of the sporting event (including hoisting of the flags, parade of the athletes and welcome speeches) with an artistic performance to showcase the host nation's culture. The 2018 Games were formally opened by Charles, Prince of Wales. Jack Morton Worldwide was given the contract to produce the opening and closing ceremonies of the 2018 Commonwealth Games. The theme of the opening ceremony was Hello Earth and directed by David Zolkwer.

The ceremony began at 20:00 AEST and lasted almost three hours. It was watched by an estimated worldwide television of 1.5 billion. The principal sections of the artistic display represented Australia's Indigenous culture, Gold Coast's Surfers Paradise, wildlife and theme parks. A medley of Australian classics were played live by the Queensland Symphony Orchestra, Queensland Youth Orchestra and Gold Coast Youth Orchestra during the parade of nations. Popular Australian recording artists such as Christine Anu, Delta Goodrem, Katie Noonan and Ricki-Lee Coulter performed at the ceremony. The opening ceremony was seen as a tremendous success and worldwide praised.

== Preparations ==
Three Australian companies: Specktak International, World Events, Dae Global and one American company Jack Morton Worldwide (JMW) submitted bids to the Gold Coast 2018 Commonwealth Games Corporation (GOLDOC) to produce the opening and closing ceremonies of the 2018 Commonwealth Games in Gold Coast. On 27 December 2015, the GOLDOC announced they chose Jack Morton Worldwide to produce the ceremonies of the games. This sparked a controversy as the head of all the three Australian Companies Ric Birch, head of Spectak, David Atkins, head of Dae Global and Julie Brooks, head of World Events questioned to GOLDOC that why an American company (JMW) was chosen for the production of ceremonies which was going to happen in Australia. Ric Birch, who co-ordinated the ceremonies of the 1982 Commonwealth Games in Brisbane, the 2000 Summer Olympics in Sydney and the 1992 Summer Olympics in Barcelona, called for a review of the decision to overlook three Australian companies to present the ceremonies at the 2018 Commonwealth Games in Gold Coast. GOLDOC's head of communications Marcus Taylor said that JMW is an international company which have been working in Australia since 1983 and have a range of experiences in producing the ceremonies of events as they have previously done for 2004 Summer Olympics in Athens, 2006 Commonwealth Games in Melbourne and the 2014 Commonwealth Games in Glasgow.

On 22 November 2017, the GOLDOC revealed some of the key artistic personnel working on the ceremonies of the games. The creative team for the opening and closing ceremonies consisted of a roster of renowned individuals. Leading the ceremonies team as Artistic Director and Project Director was David Zolkwer, Head of Jack Morton Worldwide Public Events. David previously led the teams for the 2004 Summer Olympics in Athens, 2002 Commonwealth Games in Manchester, 2006 Commonwealth Games in Melbourne and 2014 Commonwealth Games in Glasgow. Australian singer Katie Noonan, winner of five ARIA music awards and former lead singer of Brisbane based band George, was given the role of the Music Director of the ceremonies. Katie said "I'm a fiercely proud Queensland musician; I think we make some of the best music in the world and indeed some of the best art in the world. There's some truly world class dance and music being made here, so it's a good time to focus on our (cultural) identity and realise that we're really good at what we do." She served as the artistic director of the Queensland Music Festival from 2015 to 2019.

Nathan M. Wright served as the Head of Choreography and Staging Director for the opening ceremony. Nathan is a highly respected choreographer and performer who has worked on large-scale events extensively, including choreography for the opening and closing ceremonies of both the 2012 Summer Olympics and Paralympics in London and the opening ceremony of the 2014 Winter Olympics in Sochi. The role of Executive Producer for the ceremonies was given to Merryn Hughes. Merryn has also served as the Executive Producer for the ceremonies of the 2015 Pacific Games in Papua New Guinea and the closing ceremony of the 2010 Winter Olympics in Vancouver.

== Dignitaries in attendance ==
- Charles, Prince of Wales, representing Queen Elizabeth II Queen of Australia
- (United Kingdom) Camilla, Duchess of Cornwall
- Governor-General of Australia Sir Peter Cosgrove
- Prime Minister of Australia Malcolm Turnbull
- (Australia) Premier of Queensland Annastacia Palaszczuk
- (Australia) Governor of Queensland Paul de Jersey
- (Australia) Mayor of the Gold Coast Tom Tate
- President of the Commonwealth Games Federation Louise Martin

== Proceedings ==
=== Countdown ===
The opening ceremony started with a countdown from 65000 years quickly to 10–1 seconds. When the countdown is finished, a very large firework exploded in the middle of the ground of the Carrara Stadium.

=== Hello Earth ===
Australian Actor Jack Thompson spoke about the history of Earth along with holding an illuminated globe.

Home. That’s where we live. From here, you can’t see any borders. No barriers built to divide us, no people on different sides. All that we are, and have been, and can be, all that we value, all that we love, all our memories and stories, our hopes and our dreams, the best, and the worst, of us – is here, on that tiny grain of rock. From here there’s no sound of our quarrels, no voices in conflict, no people at war. From here it seems, we’re all the same, not drifting apart, but all connected. No sign of 'Other' – only Sister and Brother. No 'You', or 'Me' – just 'We'. From here, all that we see is all that we share: Shining, fragile, awesome… …our island home in a cosmic sea.

— Jack Thompson, in the ceremony programme

When he finished his narration, he then placed the globe in the ground which was covered with beach sand. The image of earth was projected on the ground showcasing the movement of winds, oceans, wind currents and large mass of land. A group of girls stood at the image projection of land and raised their right hands. The large mass of land immediately separated into seven continents. After the separation of land masses, a white humpback whale "Migaloo" was shown swimming across the oceans and diving into the land of Australia.

=== Four Winds ===
World-renowned didgeridoo player William Barton played his instrument at the top of the Q1 tower. Hip-hop artist Mau Power from Thursday Island in the Torres Strait and Australian singer Christine Anu sang the song "My Island Home" along with Four Winds Didgeridoo Orchestra. A group of dancers holding small glowing spheres danced along with the song. When the song finished, the dancers immediately stood adjacent to each other forming the shape of Australian land boundary. Christine Anu sang the same song at the closing ceremony of the 2000 Summer Olympics and in the opening ceremonies of the 2000 Summer Paralympics in Sydney.

=== Welcome of dignitaries ===
Charles, Prince of Wales, Camilla, Duchess of Cornwall, President of the Commonwealth Games Federation Louise Martin, Chairman of GOLDOC Peter Beattie and President of Commonwealth Games Australia Sam Coffa entered the stadium and welcomed with a huge applause by the audience. Afterwards, the Australian anthem was performed in a completely unusual way. The first part of the anthem was sung through an edited video in which ordinary people were in their homes or anywhere else in the country. The second part was sung with a live vision of the Carrara Stadium with the public singing. Along the Australian flag, the Australian Aboriginal flag and the Torres Strait Islander flag were hoisted in the stadium.

When the stadia were broadcast live, the Australian coat of arms was projected on the sand stadium's ground.

=== Totem ceremony ===
After the history of Earth segment, the traditional totem ceremony was showcased. This part of the ceremony represented the moment of reconnecting and regeneration. It showcased a ritual in which the ceremonial knowledge of the totemic system was passed down from past ancestors and elders, through present elders, to the future elders. Performers from the Bangarra Dance Theatre and performers from the Bangarra's "Rekindling" programme performed a dance with shields. Rekindling is an intensive dance-based education program for Aboriginal and/or Torres Strait Islander secondary students. After the dance performance, a large firework exploded in the middle of the stadium's ground.

=== Surfer’s Paradise ===
After the Totem ceremony segment, the Surfers Paradise scene was shown. A group of people wearing swimsuits gathered into the stadium along with props such as umbrellas, deck chairs, and beach towels. The image of the scenery of beach was projected onto the stadium's ground. Australian singer Ricki-Lee Coulter performed the song "Technicolor Love" and the people wearing swimsuits danced on the song.

=== Parade of Nations ===
Following tradition, the host of the previous games, Scotland entered first, followed by the rest of the European countries competing. Following this, all countries paraded in alphabetical order from their respective regions. After the European countries entered, countries from Africa, the Americas, Asia, the Caribbean, and lastly Oceania marched in. The host nation of Australia entered last. The Parade of Nations track, designed by Cairns based Torres Strait Islander visual artist Brian Robinson, was a specially commissioned artwork drawing on indigenous and local culture and mythology, featuring stars, surfboards, sea animals and shells. The young Surf Lifesavers of Australia, popularly called as the "Nippers", escorted the athletes carrying a surfboard bearing the country name.

After the parade of Commonwealth Nations, Australian singer Katie Noonan sang "You’re Welcome Here" with playing a piano backed by the Gold Coast Choir. She was also the musical director of the opening and closing ceremonies of the games.

=== Smoking ceremony ===
Contemporary aboriginal artist Luther Cora performed a traditional smoking ceremony with his family. The smoking ceremony is an ancient and enduring custom still practiced widely among many Indigenous Australians. It involved burning various native plants to produce smoke. It was mentioned in The Guardian that the meaning of the ceremony was to cleanse oneself by bathing in the smoke and connect with each other and with the land. It was also about connecting with good spirits.

=== Hoisting of the CGF flag ===
The Commonwealth Games flag was brought into the stadium by six athletes namely Dominican high jumper Brendan Williams, South African para swimmer Natalie Du Toit (para-sport representative), New Zealand professional racing cyclist Alison Shanks, Canadian high jumper Nicole Forrester, retired Scottish rugby union player Colin Gregor and Scottish women's hockey player Rhona Toft. The six athletes were also appointed to the CGF Athlete Advisory Commission on 3 April 2018. Australian singer John Farnham's song "You're the Voice" was played when the athletes entered into the stadium with the flag. John Farnham performed the same song at the closing ceremony of the 2006 Commonwealth Games in Melbourne.

=== Oath ===
Australian lawn bowls athlete Karen Murphy took the athlete's oath, while Australian netball coach Lisa Alexander took the coaches oath and athletics official Desmond Johnston took the officials oath.

The Oath We come to this place from many lands… To demonstrate the spirit of true sportsmanship that we all share. And to stand up for the values and ideals that live at the heart of these Games: Our shared Humanity – the respect we give each other, finding lasting friendships and common ground in our diversity. Our shared Equality – the level playing field on which we compete, providing fairness and opportunity for all. And our shared Destiny – to do our best here, so we inspire individuals and communities around the world to realise their own aspirations. This is our oath.

— Australian lawn bowls athlete Karen Murphy, Australian netball coach Lisa Alexander and athletics official Desmond Johnston, in the ceremony programme

=== Speeches ===
Chairman of GOLDOC The Hon. Peter Beattie AC gave a speech about the games and welcomed the athletes.

Beautiful one day, perfect the next. Welcome to Australia, welcome to Queensland, and welcome to the Gold Coast!

— The Hon. Peter Beattie AC, Chairman of GOLDOC

After him, President of the CGF Dame Louise Martin gave a speech about the games. She started her speech by telling about her own experiences when she was an athlete representing Scotland at the 1962 Commonwealth Games in Perth. She also stated that the 2018 Commonwealth Games were the first International Multi Sport Event to have equal medal opportunities for both men and women and the first Games to include a Reconciliation Action Plan, respecting and recognising the first nation peoples of the entire Commonwealth. Further she added that the games were the largest fully inclusive para-sport medal events programme ever at a Commonwealth Games; the largest at any international sports event.

The Commonwealth is now more relevant than ever before

— Dame Louise Martin, President of the CGF

=== Queen's Baton and opening of the games ===
The Queen's baton, which contained the message letter written by Queen Elizabeth II at the Buckingham Palace in London, was brought into the stadium in the kombi van by Australian former swimmer Susie O’Neill AM. She then went to the centre of the stadium. Images and videos of popular Gold Coast attractions were projected on the ground of the stadium such as feeding lorikeets, skydiving, dreaming in the ocean, walking in the treetops, and riding the rollercoaster. After that, she handed over the baton to Australian former cyclist Brad McGee OAM, who took it to Australian wheelchair racer Kurt Fearnley AO. Kurt after parading it around the stadium, handed over to Australian netballer Liz Ellis AO, who then took it to Australian hockey player Brent Livermore OAM. Finally, Brent handed the baton over to Australian hurdler Sally Pearson OAM. She received a large applause from the audience as she lives in Gold Coast. She went to the dais along with the baton and hand it over to Louise Martin. Louise removed the Queen's message from the baton and handed to HRH Prince Charles. Charles read out the message and declared the competition officially open.

It now gives me the greatest pleasure to declare the 21st Commonwealth Games open.

— HRH Charles, Prince of Wales

=== In the end ===
Australian singer-songwriter Delta Goodrem performed her song "Welcome to Earth". After her performance, a large number of people gathered at the stadium and Sigur-Rossy music was played. A large white whale Migaloo shaped balloon was brought into the stadium. Images of Antarctica and the Great Barrier Reef were projected on the whale shaped balloon. The artwork was designed by Delvene Cockatoo-Collins, the artist who also designed the medals for the Games. Australian singer Ruel sang his song "Golden Years" and fireworks exploded on the roof of the stadium. Delta Goodrem's "Together We Are One" remix version single was played after Ruel's performance and a large number of fireworks exploded on the roof of the Carrara stadium and also near The Star Gold Coast hotel.

== Music ==
Katie Noonan, winner of five ARIA music awards, was Musical Director of the opening ceremony of the 2018 Commonwealth Games. The soundtrack was produced by Michael Tan, who was appointed the role of musical arranger and composer.

The ceremony featured the performances of singers, orchestras and songs of Australia in order to give an exposure of Australian music around the world and to showcase the culture of Australia. In the Four Winds segment, Australian singer Christine Anu and Torres Strait rapper Mau Power covered the song "My Island Home" which was one of the hit songs in Australia in 1995. Australian pop singer Ricki-Lee Coulter sang "Technicolor Love" during the Surfer's Paradise segment in order to showcase the fun thriving beach life of Gold Coast.

During the parade of nations, an orchestral medley of Australian classics were played by the members of the Queensland Symphony Orchestra, Queensland Youth Orchestra and Gold Coast Youth Orchestra which were led by conductor John Foreman. The songs played by the orchestras were INXS's "Need You Tonight", Men at Work's "Down Under", The Church's "Under The Milky Way", Little River Band's "Reminiscing", Alex Lloyd's "Amazing’’, The Divinyls’ "I Touch Myself", Kylie Minogue's "Can’t Get You Out of My Head", Australian Crawl's "Reckless" and Stevie Wright's "Evie".

Katie Noonan performed a song "You’re Welcome Here" after the parade of nations. "You’re The Voice", recorded by Australian singer John Farnham and one of the biggest hits in 1986 in Australia was played by the orchestra when the CGF flag was brought into the stadium. Australian pop singer Delta Goodrem, winner of nine ARIA music awards, performed the official theme song of the opening ceremony "Welcome to Earth".

Main musical items in the opening ceremony, in the order first performed
Piece	Artist	Written by	Notes
"My Island Home"	Christine Anu and Mau Power	Neil Murray	Played live during the Four Winds segment
"Advance Australia Fair" (National Anthem)	Sung by people of Australia	Peter Dodds McCormick	Sung live while the Australian flag was raised
"Technicolor Love"	Ricki-Lee Coulter	Ricki-Lee Coulter	Played live during the Surfer's Paradise segment
"Need You Tonight"	INXS	Andrew Farriss and Michael Hutchence	Played live by the orchestras during the parade of nations
"Down Under"	Men at Work	Colin Hay and Ron Strykert	Played live by the orchestras during the parade of nations
"Under The Milky Way"	The Church	Steve Kilbey and Karin Jansson	Played live by the orchestras during the parade of nations
"Reminiscing"	Little River Band	Graeham Goble	Played live by the orchestras during the parade of nations
"Amazing’’	Alex Lloyd	Alex Lloyd	Played live by the orchestras during the parade of nations
"I Touch Myself"	The Divinyls	Christina Amphlett, Mark McEntee, Tom Kelly and Billy Steinberg	Played live by the orchestras during the parade of nations
"Can't Get You Out of My Head"	Kylie Minogue	Cathy Dennis and Rob Davis	Played live by the orchestras during the parade of nations
"Reckless"	Australian Crawl	James Reyne	Played live by the orchestras during the parade of nations
"Evie"	Stevie Wright	Harry Vanda and George Young	Played live by the orchestras during the parade of nations
"You’re Welcome Here"	Katie Noonan	Katie Noonan	Played live after the parade of nations
"You’re The Voice"	John Farnham	Andy Qunta, Keith Reid, Maggie Ryder and Chris Thompson	Played as the CGF flag is being paraded and raised
"Welcome to Earth"	Delta Goodrem	Delta Goodrem, Stuart Crichton, David Hodges and Vince Pizzinga	Written specially as the official theme song of the opening ceremony and played live
"Golden Years"	Ruel	M-Phazes	Played live
"Together We Are One"	Delta Goodrem	Guy Chambers, Delta Goodrem and Brian McFadden	Played during the final fireworks display

== Reviews ==
The Courier-Mail said "Gold Coast finally welcomed the world to its biggest ever party with a dazzling Commonwealth Games opening ceremony". The New Daily said the opening ceremony had "wowed" the fans on the Gold Coast. The Gold Coast Bulletin called the opening ceremony as "dazzling" and "welcomed the world to its biggest ever party". The West Australian said that the "Spirits gone high" in the Gold Coast after the opening ceremony. The SBS called the ceremony as "dazzling" and the ABC said that the opening ceremony had "signaled great start for the 2018 Commonwealth Games".

Foreign reaction was overwhelmingly positive. The BBC said the 2018 Commonwealth Games started with a "colorful" and "spectacular" opening ceremony. The London Evening Standard said the games began with a "spectacular opening ceremony paying tribute to region's Aboriginal history." The Daily Telegraph reported "Gold Coast Commonwealth Games began with every symbol of Australiana".

The Firstpost said "Opening ceremony of Commonwealth Games 2018 celebrates indigenous culture, beaches and diversity". The Times of India provided live updates of the ceremony in their official website and at the end commented "What a spectacular welcome Gold Coast has given to the participating teams!". The Hindu said "...the opening ceremony of the XXI Commonwealth Games on Wednesday night was painted with colour and gaiety....". They also commented "The pageant showcased the Australian tradition and culture in all its glory".

The CNN reported "Commonwealth Games' opening ceremony celebrates Australia's Indigenous culture". However, the CNN also commented that the Commonwealth Games are regarded as an enduring reminder of British imperialism. As it was raining for few minutes at the beginning of the opening ceremony, the Toronto Star noticed and commented "Commonwealth Games begin after rain drenches spectators at Gold Coast opening ceremony".

== Technical aspects ==
Norwest productions was the official audio supplier for the opening and closing ceremonies of the Games. A large optocore fibre network was used for site-wide signal distribution by the company. Stagekings, a Sutherland Shire company provided the sets and staging for the opening ceremony. The company constructed most of the structures, from the speech stages, flag stages, the sand centre-piece, the sand surround (compete with smoke effect and light ring), the parade path, mobile lifeguard tower, the beach showers, lecterns, the Royal Box, Migaloo's buggy, even the glowing globe that Jack Thompson used to open the show. Cairns based Torres Strait Islander visual artist Brian Robinson designed the Parade Track in the Carrara stadium.

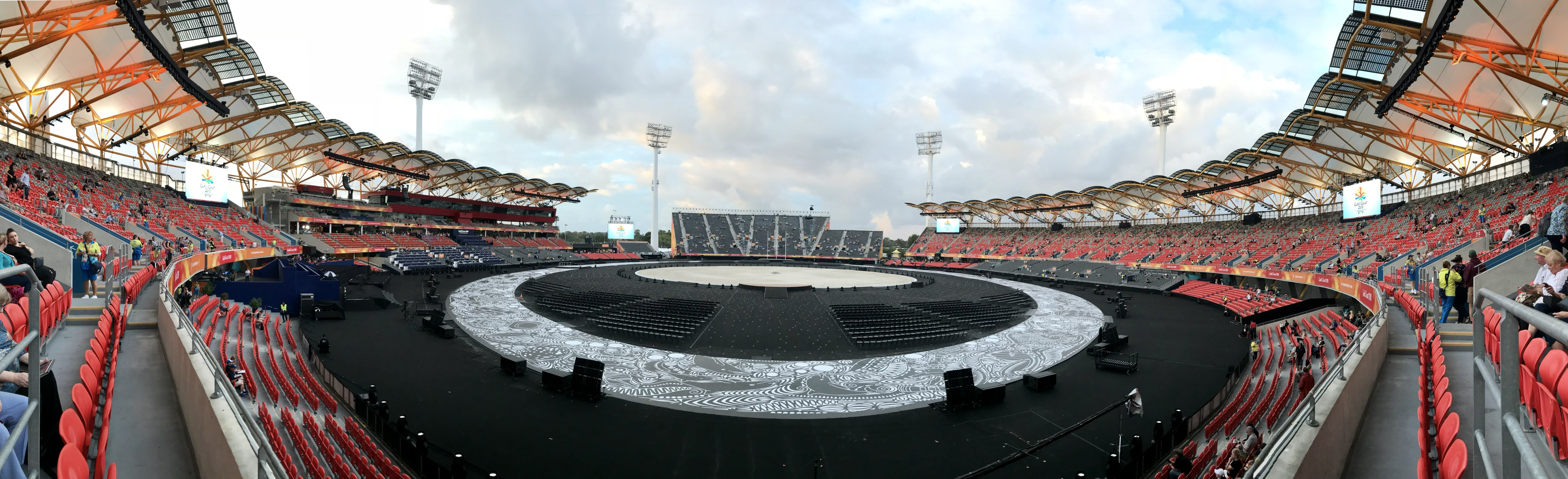
Carrara Stadium, set up for the 2018 Commonwealth Games opening ceremony

== Controversy ==
Some 15,000 tickets for the event had the wrong day printed on them (Thursday), instead of the correct date (Wednesday).

== See also ==
- 1982 Commonwealth Games opening ceremony
- 2006 Commonwealth Games opening ceremony
- 2000 Summer Olympics opening ceremony
