= Commonwealth Games: Melbourne 2006 Opening Ceremony =

Live album by Various artists
- Released: 19 March 2006
- Recorded: 2006
- Label: Sony BMG Music Entertainment Australia

Various artists chronology
Commonwealth Games: Melbourne 2006 Opening Ceremony (2006)	Commonwealth Games: Melbourne 2006 Closing Ceremony (2006)

Commonwealth Games: Melbourne 2006 Opening Ceremony, 2006 Commonwealth Games Opening Ceremony or Melbourne 2006, XVIII Commonwealth Games: Official Music from the Opening Ceremony, features music by Various Artists from the 2006 Commonwealth Games opening ceremony. The ceremony took place on 15 March 2006 at the Melbourne Cricket Ground and the live album was released by Sony BMG Music Entertainment Australia on 19 March 2006. Performers included Melbourne Symphony Orchestra, the Church, the Cat Empire, Ursula Yovich and Delta Goodrem. The score was written by Christopher Gordon, and was commissioned by the Melbourne 2006 Commonwealth Games Committee. The performance was partly funded by the Australian Government's Department of Communications, Information Technology and the Arts.

It peaked at No. 56 on the ARIA Albums Chart, with ARIA's Ian Wallace determining the highlights were, "The Church's collaboration with Melbourne Symphony Orchestra for the song 'Under the Milky Way', Delta Goodrem singing the track 'Together We Are One' in which she co-wrote with her boyfriend Brian McFadden especially for the Games, and the track 'Cities' by The Cat Empire." In December 2006 it was certified gold by ARIA for shipment of 35000 copies. Adrian Regan of Museums Victoria analysed the opening ceremony, which provided an overarching story of "a young boy's journey. [It] was told through three main 'creative segments'."

== Track listing ==
Catalogue number: 82876820592

1. "Countdown" – Melbourne Symphony Orchestra
2. "Journey to the Stadium" – Melbourne Symphony Orchestra
3. "Welcome to the MCG" – Melbourne Symphony Orchestra
4. "Raising of the 3 Nation Flags" – Melbourne Symphony Orchestra
5. "The Arrival of the Head of the Commonwealth" – Melbourne Symphony Orchestra
6. "The National Anthem" – Melbourne Symphony Orchestra
7. "Welcome to Melbourne" – Melbourne Symphony Orchestra
8. "Boy on the Bay" – Melbourne Symphony Orchestra & Young Voices of Melbourne
9. "My Skin My Life" – David Page, vocals by Ursula Yovich
10. "Under the Milky Way" – The Church & Melbourne Symphony Orchestra
11. "Cities" – The Cat Empire
12. "Queen's Baton Relay" – Melbourne Symphony Orchestra
13. "Raising of the CGF Flag" – Melbourne Symphony Orchestra
14. "Together We Are One" – Delta Goodrem
15. "Finale" – Melbourne Symphony Orchestra

== Certifications ==
Region	Certification	Certified units/sales
Australia (ARIA)	Platinum	15,000^{^}
^{^} Shipments figures based on certification alone.

== See also ==
- Commonwealth Games: Melbourne 2006 Closing Ceremony
- 2006 Commonwealth Games
- 2006 Commonwealth Games Opening Ceremony
