= 2018 Commonwealth Games Queen's Baton Relay =

Relay race started in London in 2017

- Host city: Gold Coast, Australia
- Countries visited: All 71 Commonwealth Nations
- Distance: 230,000 km (142915 miles)
- Baton bearers: 8,000
- Start date: 13 March 2017
- End date: 4 April 2018
- Baton designer: Alex Wall and Warren Shroeder

The 2018 Commonwealth Games Queen's Baton Relay was run from 13 March 2017 until 4 April 2018, prior to the Gold Coast 2018 Commonwealth Games. The baton bearer selection process for the Australian segment was announced on 18 October 2017.

As well as touring Australia the schedule included the other 70 Commonwealth Nations.

== Organisation ==
The Queen's Baton Relay was launched on Commonwealth Day, 13 March 2017, on the historic forecourt at Buckingham Palace in London, signalling the official countdown to the start of the Games. Accompanied by the Duke of Edinburgh and Prince Edward, Her Majesty Queen Elizabeth II heralded the start of the relay by placing her 'message to the Commonwealth and its athletes' into the distinctive loop-design Queen's Baton which then set off on its journey around the globe. Her Majesty was accompanied by Louise Martin, President of the Commonwealth Games Federation (CGF), Peter Beattie, Chairman of the Gold Coast 2018 Commonwealth Games Corporation (GOLDOC) and Yugambeh elders Patricia O'Connor and Ted Williams in the ceremony. The Queen's baton was brought into the stage by Australian Paralympic champion Kurt Fearnley . He started from Marlborough House up The Mall and then into the Forecourt of Buckingham Palace. He was also accompanied by the Band of the Scots Guards, who played by permission of Major General BJ Bathurst, The Major General commanding the Household Division. After the message was placed safely inside the Baton, The Queen handed over the baton to Australian cyclist and Commonwealth and Olympic Games gold medalist Anna Meares. She, along with English track cyclist Victoria Pendleton, then carried the baton around the Queen Victoria Memorial and handed over to the Australian singer Cody Simpson. He then boarded on a Kombi van with the baton and left the place as an indication to the Baton's final destination, Gold Coast.

The baton travelled for 388 days, spending time in every nation and territory of the Commonwealth. The Gold Coast 2018 Queen's Baton Relay was the longest in Commonwealth Games history. Covering 230,000 km over 388 days, the baton made its way through the six Commonwealth regions of Africa, the Americas, the Caribbean, Europe, Asia and Oceania. For the first time in the history of the baton relay, the Queen's Baton was presented at the Commonwealth Youth Games during its sixth edition in 2017 which was held in Nassau, Bahamas. The baton landed on Australian soil on 24 December 2017 and then spent 100 days travelling through Australia.

== The Queen's baton ==
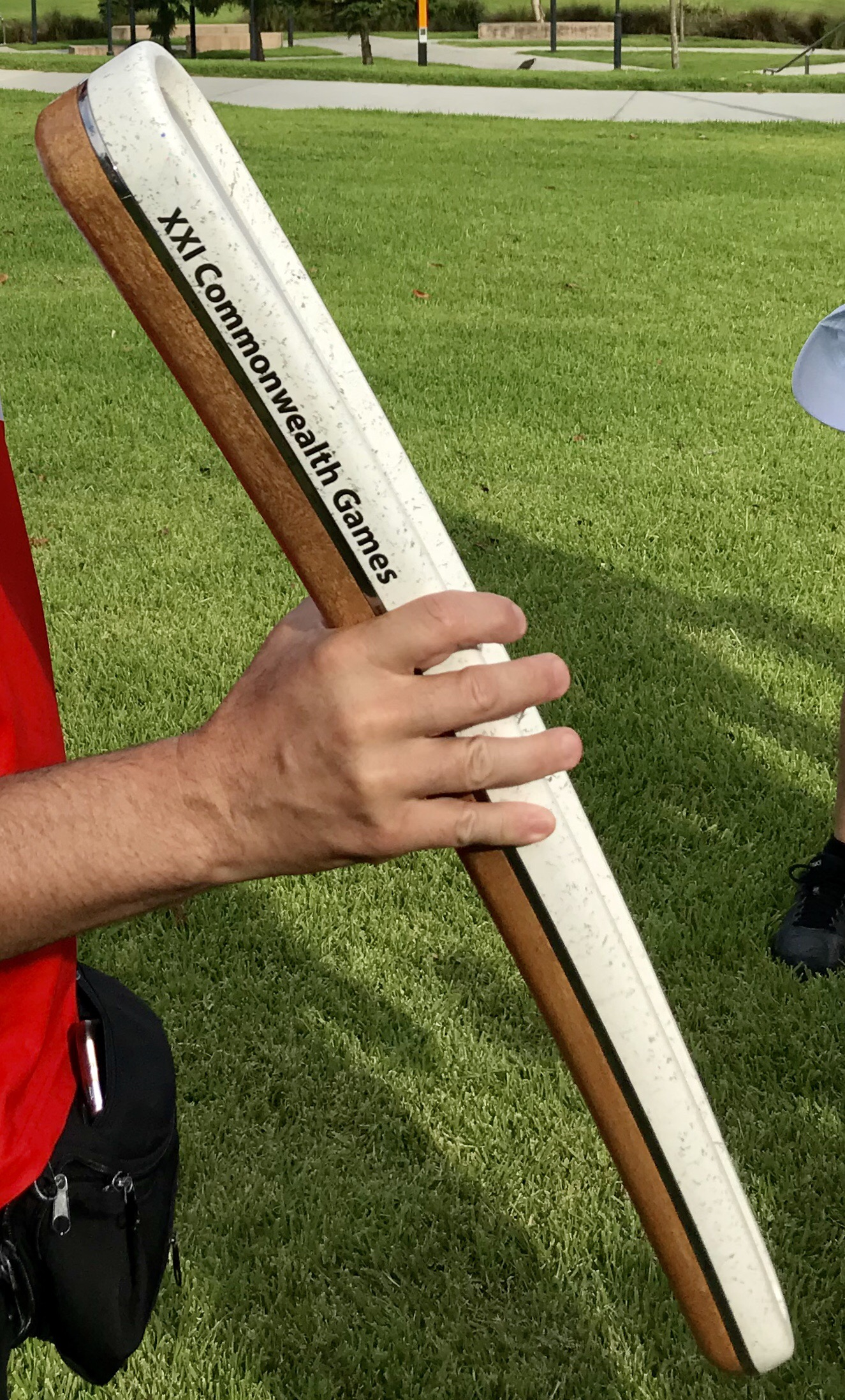
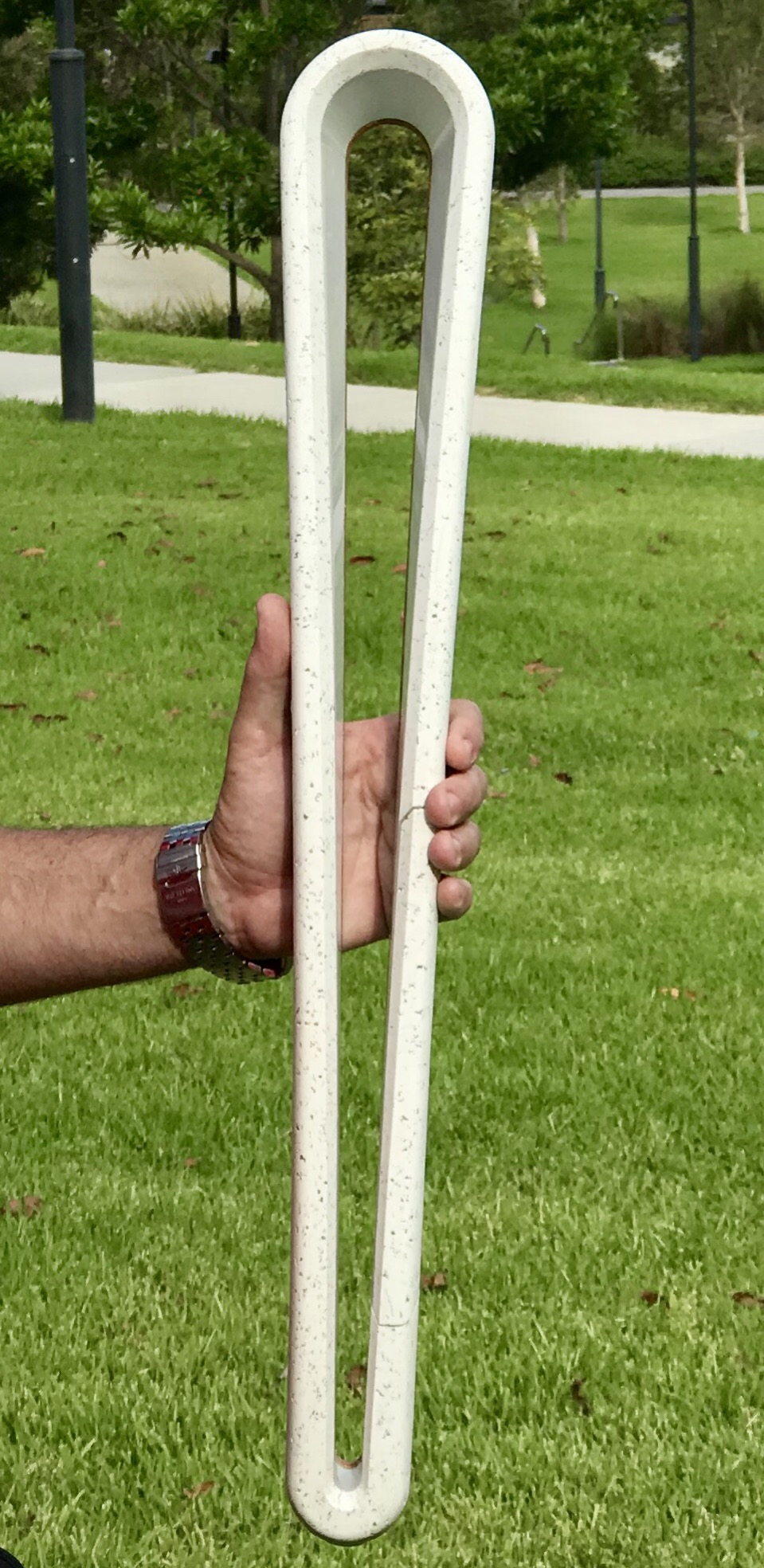
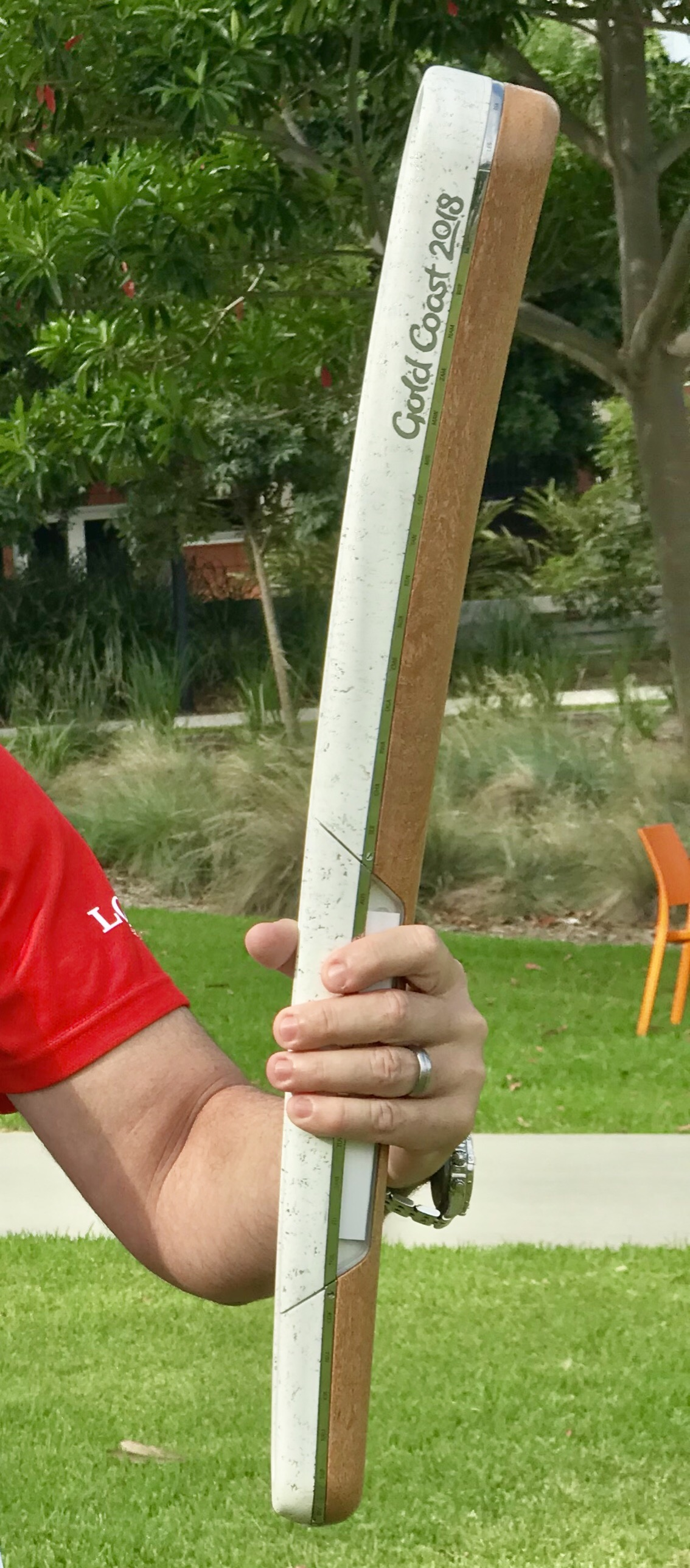
Queen's baton for the 2018 Commonwealth Games.

The Queen's baton for the 2018 Commonwealth Games had a distinctive loop design and was made of macadamia wood and recycled plastic sourced from Gold Coast waterways. Its design was inspired by the Queensland's "vibrant spirit and indigenous heritage" and with sustainability. The design of the baton was unveiled on 20 November 2016 at a special ceremony in the Jupiter Gold Coast Hotel. The baton was designed by Alex Wall and Warren Shroeder from the Brisbane-based firm Designworks. At the 2018 Good Design Awards conducted by the Good Design Australia, the baton won the Best Product Sport and Lifestyle award.

== International route ==
=== Africa ===
The Queen's Baton travelled in the following countries in Africa:

Sl. No.	Nation/Territory	Arrival date
1	Sierra Leone	15 March 2017
2	Ghana	18 March 2017
3	Rwanda	22 March 2017
4	Uganda	25 March 2017
5	Cameroon	29 March 2017
6	Nigeria	1 April 2017
7	Kenya	5 April 2017
8	United Republic of Tanzania	8 April 2017
9	Seychelles	11 April 2017
10	Mauritius	15 April 2017
11	Malawi	20 April 2017
12	Zambia	24 April 2017
13	Namibia	27 April 2017
14	Botswana	1 May 2017
15	Mozambique	4 May 2017
16	Eswatini	8 May 2017
17	Lesotho	11 May 2017
18	South Africa	15 May 2017
19	Saint Helena	20 May 2017

=== Caribbean ===
The Queen's baton traveled in the following countries in the Caribbean:

Sl. No.	Nation/Territory	Arrival date
20	Trinidad and Tobago	28 May 2017
21	Grenada	31 May 2017
22	St Vincent and the Grenadines	3 June 2017
23	Saint Lucia	7 June 2017
24	Barbados	10 June 2017
25	Dominica	14 June 2017
26	Antigua and Barbuda	17 June 2017
27	Montserrat	21 June 2017
28	St Kitts and Nevis	24 June 2017
29	Anguilla	28 June 2017
30	British Virgin Islands	1 July 2017
31	Jamaica	5 July 2017
32	Turks and Caicos Islands	11 July 2017
33	Cayman Islands	14 July 2017

=== Americas ===
The Queen's baton traveled in the following countries in Americas:

Sl. No.	Nation/Territory	Arrival date
34	The Bahamas	18 July 2017
35	Bermuda	24 July 2017
36	Canada	27 July 2017
37	Belize	2 August 2017
38	Guyana	7 August 2017
39	Falkland Islands	12 August 2017

=== Europe ===
The Queen's baton traveled in the following countries in Europe:

Sl. No.	Nation/Territory	Arrival date
40	England	16 August 2017
41	Scotland	22 August 2017
42	Northern Ireland	28 August 2017
43	Isle of Man	1 September 2017
44	Wales	4 September 2017
45	Guernsey	9 September 2017
46	Jersey	13 September 2017
47	Gibraltar	17 September 2017
48	Malta	21 September 2017
49	Cyprus	25 September 2017

=== Asia ===
The Queen's baton traveled in the following countries in Asia:

Sl. No.	Nation/Territory	Arrival date
50	Pakistan	29 September 2017
51	India	3 October 2017
52	Bangladesh	9 October 2017
53	Sri Lanka	12 October 2017
54	Malaysia	16 October 2017
55	Brunei Darussalam	21 October 2017
56	Singapore	25 October 2017

=== Oceania ===
The Queen's baton traveled in the following countries in Oceania:

Sl. No.	Nation/Territory	Arrival date
57	Nauru	1 November 2017
58	Kiribati	3 November 2017
59	Niue	7 November 2017
60	Cook Islands	11 November 2017
61	Tonga	16 November 2017
62	Fiji	20 November 2017
63	Samoa	23 November 2017
64	Tuvalu	28 November 2017
65	Papua New Guinea	1 December 2017
66	Solomon Islands	5 December 2017
67	Vanuatu	9 December 2017
68	Norfolk Island	15 December 2017
69	New Zealand	17 December 2017
70	Australia	24 December 2017

== National route ==
=== Australian Capital Territory ===
The Queen's baton traveled in the following places in the Australian Capital Territory:

Date	Place	Transfer
25 January 2018	Canberra	
26 January 2018	Canberra	
27 January 2018		Canberra to Wagga Wagga

=== New South Wales ===
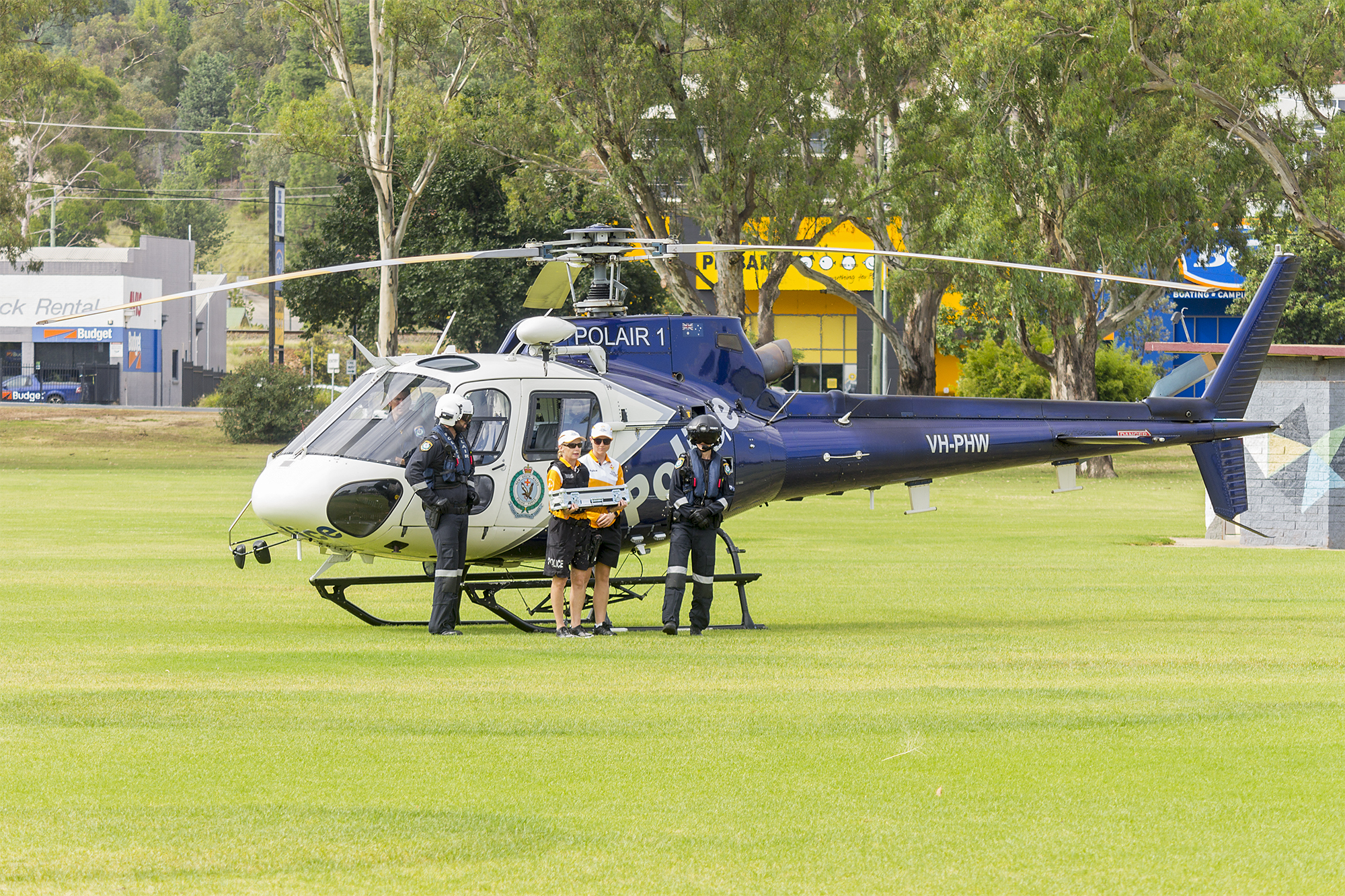
Queen's Baton arrival on NSW Police Eurocopter AS350B2 Ecureuil at Bolton Park

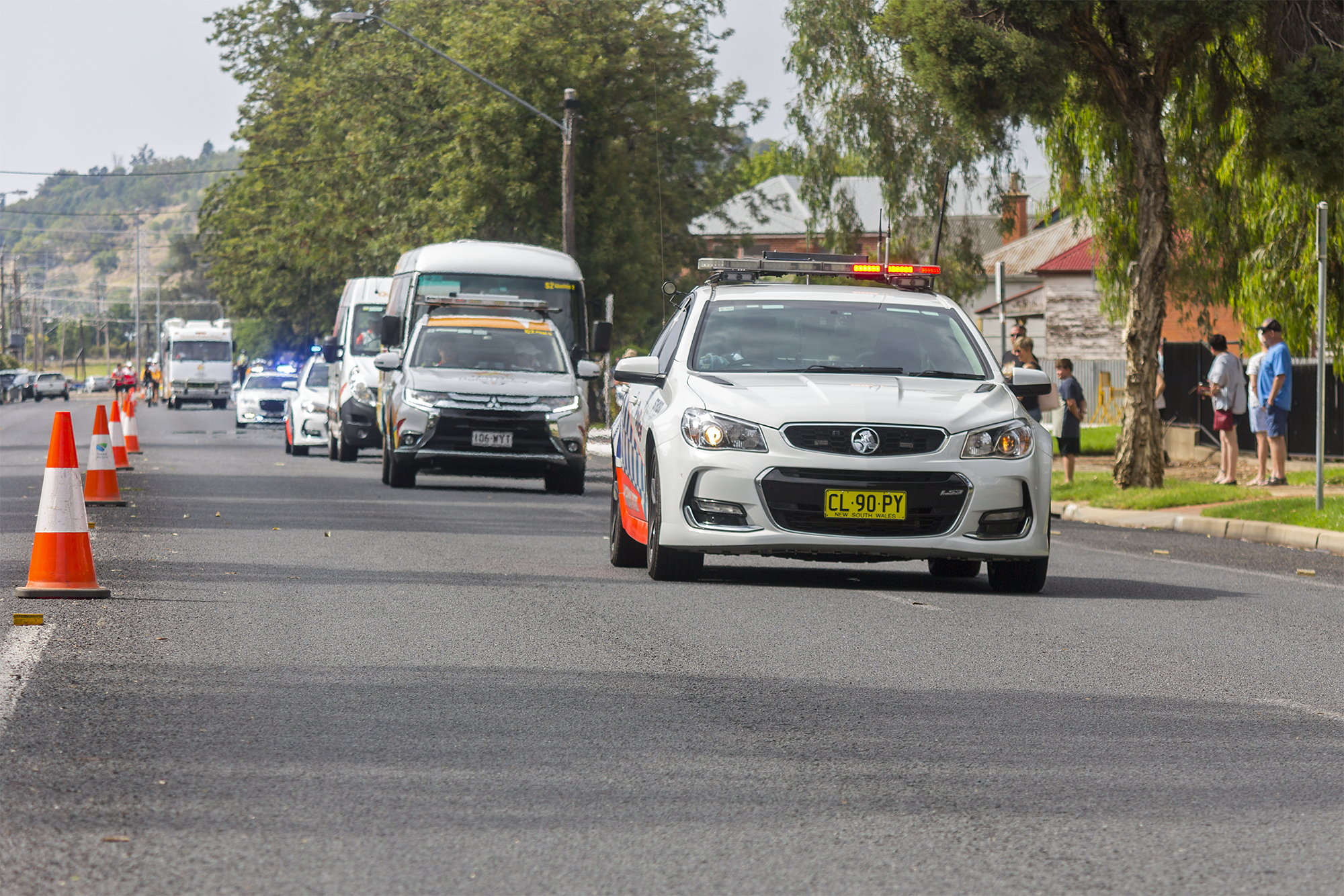
Queens Baton Relay on Tarcutta Street, Wagga Wagga

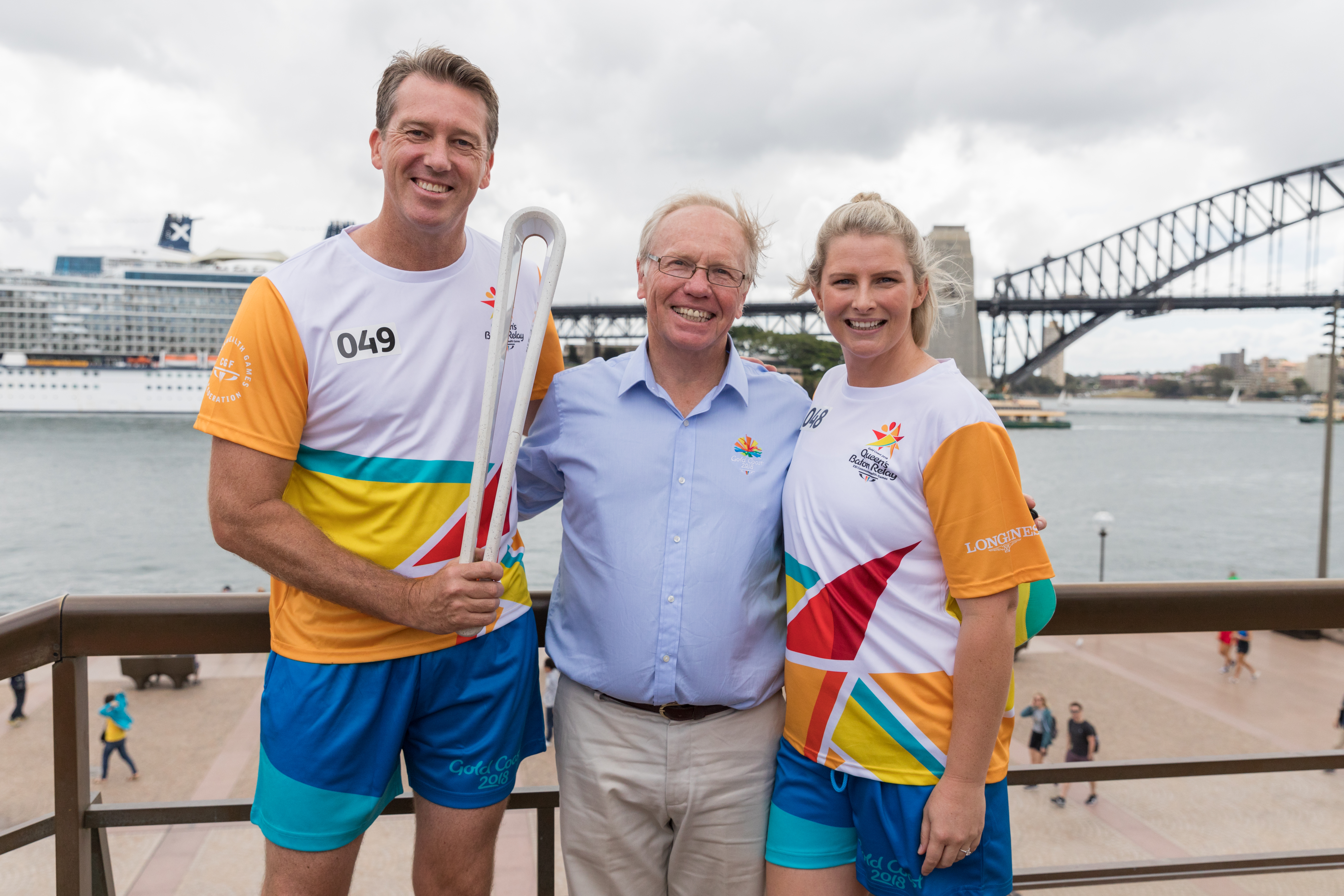
Glenn McGrath holding the Queen's baton with Peter Beattie (GOLDOC chairman) and Leisel Jones in Sydney

The Queen's baton traveled in the following places in the New South Wales:

Date	Place	Transfer
28 January 2018	Wagga Wagga	
28 January 2018	Narrandera	
28 January 2018	Griffith	
29 January 2018	West Wyalong	
29 January 2018	Forbes	
29 January 2018	Parkes	
30 January 2018	Orange	
30 January 2018	Wellington	
30 January 2018	Dubbo	
31 January 2018	Coonabarabran	
31 January 2018	Gunnedah	
31 January 2018	Tamworth	
1 February 2018	Armidale	
1 February 2018	Bellingen	
1 February 2018	Coffs Harbour	
2 February 2018	Macksville	
2 February 2018	Kempsey	
2 February 2018	Forster Tuncurry	
3 February 2018	Newcastle	
3 February 2018	Gosford	
3 February 2018	Sydney	
4 February 2018	Penrith	
4 February 2018	Sydney Olympic Park	
4 February 2018	La Perouse	
5 February 2018	Wollongong	
5 February 2018	Kiama	
5 February 2018	Nowra	
6 February 2018	Batemans Bay	Batemans Bay to Launceston

=== Tasmania ===
The Queen's baton traveled in the following places in Tasmania:

Date	Place	Transfer
7 February 2018	Launceston	
7 February 2018	Devonport	
7 February 2018	Burnie	
8 February 2018		Travel Day
9 February 2018	Clarence	
9 February 2018	Glenorchy	
9 February 2018	Hobart	Hobart to Melbourne

=== Victoria ===
The Queen's baton traveled in the following places in Victoria:

Date	Place	Transfer
10 February 2018	St Kilda	
10 February 2018	South Melbourne	
10 February 2018	Melbourne	
10 February 2018	Williamstown	
10 February 2018	Altona	
10 February 2018	Footscray	
11 February 2018	Morwell	
11 February 2018	Warragul	
11 February 2018	Frankston	
12 February 2018	Sorrento	
12 February 2018	Queensclif	
12 February 2018	Torquay	
12 February 2018	Geelong	
13 February 2018	Werribee	
13 February 2018	Ballarat	
13 February 2018	Ararat	
14 February 2018	Bendigo	
14 February 2018	Shepparton	
14 February 2018	Wangaratta	
15 February 2018	Wodonga	
15 February 2018	Yarrawonga	
15 February 2018	Echuca	
16 February 2018	Murrabit	
16 February 2018	Kerang	
16 February 2018	Swan Hill	
17 February 2018	Nyah	
17 February 2018	Robinvale	
17 February 2018	Mildura	Mildura to Renmark Paringa

=== South Australia ===
The Queen's baton traveled in the following places in South Australia:

Date	Place	Transfer
18 February 2018	Renmark Paringa	
18 February 2018	Angaston	
18 February 2018	Glenelg	
18 February 2018	Adelaide	
19 February 2018	Coffin Bay	
19 February 2018	Port Lincoln	
20 February 2018	Penneshaw	
20 February 2018	Kingscote	
21 February 2018	Aldinga	
21 February 2018	Hahndorf	
21 February 2018	Lobethal	
21 February 2018	Stirling	Adelaide to Albany

=== Western Australia ===
The Queen's baton traveled in the following places in Western Australia:

Date	Place	Transfer
22 February 2018	Albany	
22 February 2018	Denmark	
22 February 2018	Manjimup	
23 February 2018	Bridgetown	
23 February 2018	Bunbury	
23 February 2018	Rockingham	
24 February 2018	Rottnest Island	
24 February 2018	Fremantle	
24 February 2018	South Perth	
24 February 2018	Burswood Park	
24 February 2018	Perth	
25 February 2018	Kings Park	
25 February 2018	City Beach	
25 February 2018	Scarborough	
25 February 2018	Hillarys	
26 February 2018	Quinns Rocks	
26 February 2018	Wanneroo	
26 February 2018	Guildford	
27 February 2018	Karratha	Karratha to Alice Springs

=== Northern Territory ===
The Queen's baton traveled in the following places in the Northern Territory:

Date	Place
28 February 2018	Alice Springs
1 March 2018	Alice Springs
1 March 2018	Litchfield
2 March 2018	Palmerston
2 March 2018	Darwin

=== Queensland ===
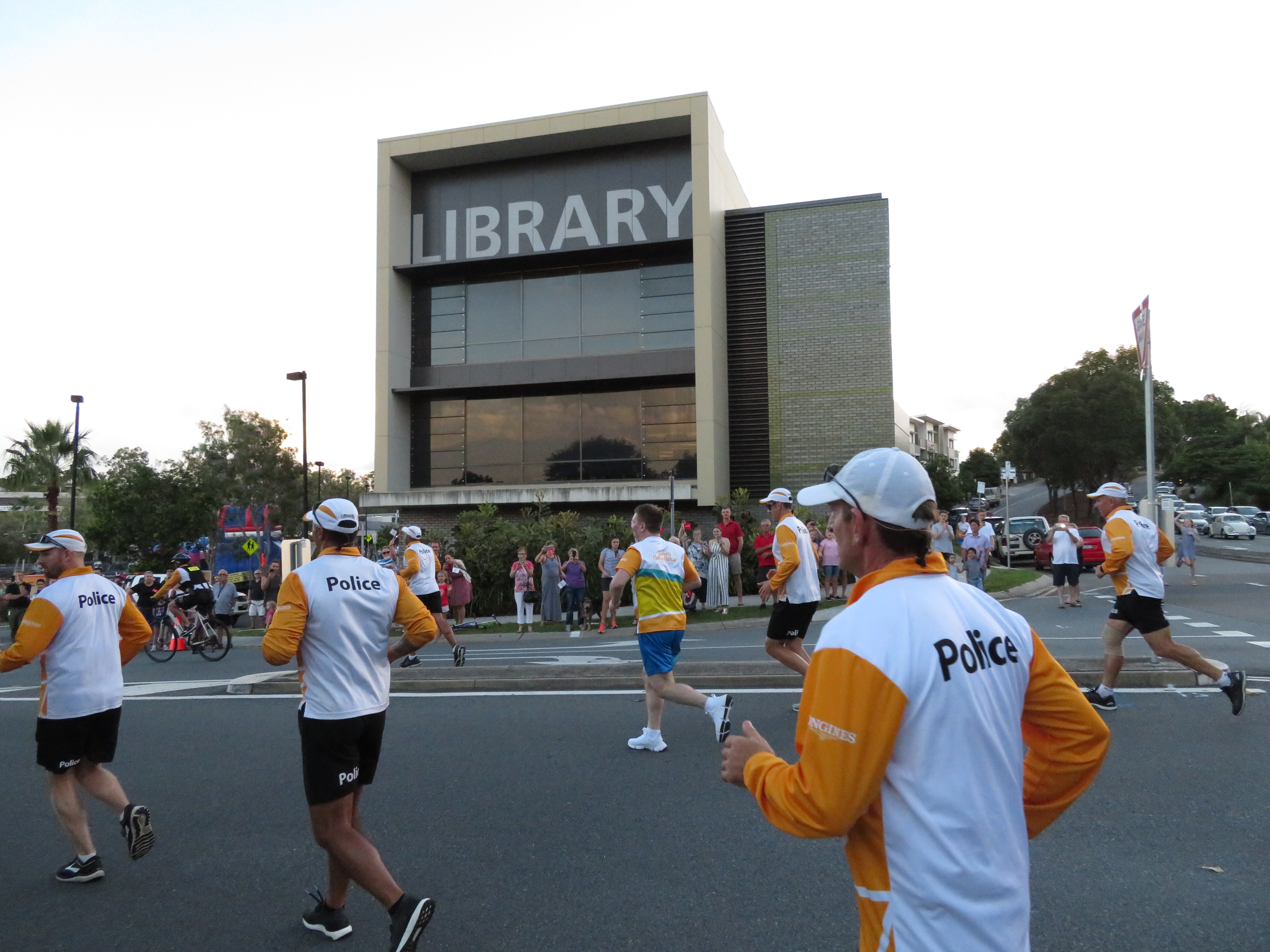
2018 Queen's Baton Relay passing in front of Helensvale Library

The Queen's baton traveled in the following places in Queensland:

Date	Place	Transfer
3 March 2018	Horn Island	Darwin to Horn Island
3 March 2018	Thursday Island	
3 March 2018	Hammond Island	
4 March 2018	Injinoo	
4 March 2018	Umagico	
4 March 2018	Bamaga	
4 March 2018	New Mapoon	
4 March 2018	Seisia	
5 March 2018	Cooktown	
6 March 2018	Cloncurry	
6 March 2018	Mount Isa	
7 March 2018	Birdsville	
7 March 2018	Roma	
8 March 2018	Mitchell	
8 March 2018	Morven	
8 March 2018	Charleville	
9 March 2018	Augathella	
9 March 2018	Tambo	
9 March 2018	Blackall	
10 March 2018	Barcaldine	
10 March 2018	Ilfracombe	
10 March 2018	Longreach	
11 March 2018	Winton	
11 March 2018	Hughenden	
12 March 2018	Prairie	
12 March 2018	Pentland	
12 March 2018	Homestead	
12 March 2018	Charters Towers	
13 March 2018		Travel day
14 March 2018	Ravenshoe	
14 March 2018	Atherton	
14 March 2018	Tolga	
14 March 2018	Mareeba	
15 March 2018		Travel day
16 March 2018	Cairns	
17 March 2018	Yarrabah	
17 March 2018	Cairns	
17 March 2018	Innisfail	
17 March 2018	Mission Beach	
17 March 2018	Tully	
18 March 2018	Cardwell	
18 March 2018	Ingham	
18 March 2018	Townsville	
19 March 2018	Townsville	
19 March 2018	Ayr	
19 March 2018	Bowen	
19 March 2018	Airlie Beach	
20 March 2018	Mackay	
21 March 2018	Nebo	
21 March 2018	Coppabella	
21 March 2018	Moranbah	
21 March 2018	Clermont	
22 March 2018	Capella	
22 March 2018	Anakie	
22 March 2018	Emerald	
23 March 2018	Blackwater	
23 March 2018	Bluff	
23 March 2018	Dingo	
23 March 2018	Duaringa	
23 March 2018	Rockhampton	
23 March 2018	Yeppoon	
24 March 2018	Gladstone	
24 March 2018	Miriam Vale	
24 March 2018	1770	
24 March 2018	Agnes Water	
24 March 2018	Bundaberg	
25 March 2018	Fraser Island	
25 March 2018	Hervey Bay	
25 March 2018	Maryborough	
26 March 2018	Gympie	
26 March 2018	Noosa Heads	
27 March 2018	Caloundra	
27 March 2018	Kilcoy	
27 March 2018	Kingaroy	
28 March 2018	Dalby	
28 March 2018	Oakey	
28 March 2018	Toowoomba	
29 March 2018	Warwick	
29 March 2018	Gatton	
29 March 2018	Ipswich	
30 March 2018	Redcliffe	
30 March 2018	Brisbane	
31 March 2018	Cleveland	
31 March 2018	Brisbane	
1 April 2018	Daisy Hill	
1 April 2018	Beenleigh	
1 April 2018	North Tamborine	
1 April 2018	Gold Coast	
2 April 2018	Gold Coast	
3 April 2018	Gold Coast	
4 April 2018	Gold Coast	

== End of Relay ==
The end of the relay took place in the 2018 Commonwealth Games opening ceremony.

The Queen's baton was brought into the Carrara Stadium in a Kombi van by Australian former swimmer Susie O'Neill. She then went to the centre of the stadium and images and videos of popular Gold Coast attractions were projected on the ground of the stadium such as feeding lorikeets, skydiving, dreaming in the ocean, walking in the treetops, and riding the rollercoaster. After that, she handed over the baton to Australian former cyclist Brad McGee, who took it to Australian wheelchair racer Kurt Fearnley. Fearnley after parading it around the stadium, handed over to Australian netballer Liz Ellis, who then took it to Australian hockey player Brent Livermore. Finally, Brent handed the baton over to Australian hurdler Sally Pearson. She received a large applause from the audience as she lives in Gold Coast. She went to the dais along with the baton and hand it over to the CGF President Louise Martin. Martin removed the Queen's message from the baton and handed to Prince Charles. Charles read out the message and declared the competition officially open.

== Sponsors ==
Tourism Australia and QSuper sponsored the international and Australian segment of Queen's Baton Relay respectively, while Longines sponsored both the segments.
