= King's Baton Relay =

Relay held worldwide prior to the Commonwealth Games

The King's Baton Relay is a relay around the world held prior to the beginning of the Commonwealth Games. The baton carries a message from the Head of the Commonwealth, currently King Charles III. The relay traditionally begins at Buckingham Palace in London, where the King entrusts the baton to the first relay runner. At the opening ceremony of the Games, the final relay runner hands the torch back to the King or his representative, who reads the message aloud to officially open the Games. The King's Baton Relay is similar to the Olympic Torch Relay.

Started as the Queen's Baton Relay for the 1958 Games, the relay has been included in every games ever since. Following the death of Queen Elizabeth II in 2022, King Charles III became the Head of the Commonwealth, leading to the relay being renamed as the King's Baton Relay for the 2026 Commonwealth Games.

== History ==
At the inaugural games, held in 1930 in Hamilton, Ontario, a message from King George V was read to the competitors. In 1936, Australian runner Rowley Bateman proposed a relay from Canberra to Sydney carrying a goodwill message for the 1938 Sydney games. A baton relay from Mountain Ash to Pontypridd to commemorate the centenary of the Welsh national anthem was organised in 1956 by athletics official Bernard Baldwin, who proposed something similar for the finale of the Commonwealth Games. Baldwin later founded the traditional New Year's Eve race 'Nos Galan' in Mountain Ash.

The Relay has been involved in every games since the 1958 British Empire and Commonwealth Games in Cardiff, Wales. The Relay for the 1998 Games in Kuala Lumpur, Malaysia was the first to incorporate a more expansive relay to other nations of the Commonwealth. The 2002 Commonwealth Games Relay covered over 100,000 kilometres (62,000 miles) and went through 23 nations.

Rather than beginning at Buckingham Palace, the 1970 relay began in at Yellowknife in Canada's Northwest Territories before the baton was flown to Scotland.

== Editions ==
Year	Relay	Description
1958	Queen's Baton Relay for the VI British Empire and Commonwealth Games Cardiff, Wales	The 1958 silver-gilt and enamel baton was designed by Cardiff jeweller and former soldier, Colonel Roy Crouch, Chairman of the Games' Medals Committee. Measuring 40 cm (16 in) in length and 4 cm (1 1/2 in) in diameter, it was decorated with Welsh national symbols, namely a red dragon, daffodils and leeks, along with crowns representing the royal connection. On 14 July 1958, the baton relay set off from the forecourt of London's Buckingham Palace, the residence of Her Majesty The Queen, Head of the Commonwealth, before travelling through several English counties and all thirteen Welsh counties on its journey to Cardiff.
1962	Queen's Baton Relay for the VII British Empire and Commonwealth Games Perth, Australia	
1966	Queen's Baton Relay for the VIII British Empire and Commonwealth Games Kingston, Jamaica	
1970	Queen's Baton Relay for the IX British Commonwealth Games Edinburgh, Scotland	
1974	Queen's Baton Relay for the X British Commonwealth Games Christchurch, New Zealand	
1978	Queen's Baton Relay for the XI Commonwealth Games Edmonton, Canada	
1982	Queen's Baton Relay for the XII Commonwealth Games Brisbane, Australia	
1986	Queen's Baton Relay for the XIII Commonwealth Games Edinburgh, Scotland	
1990	Queen's Baton Relay for the XIV Commonwealth Games Auckland, New Zealand	For the 1990 Commonwealth Games, the baton was a two-piece affair. Each piece went on its own individual relay run in the North and South Islands of New Zealand, only being joined back together in the final week before the Games began.
1994	Queen's Baton Relay for the XV Commonwealth Games Victoria, Canada	For the 1994 Commonwealth Games, the Baton was fashioned from sterling silver and was engraved with traditional symbols of the creative artists' families and cultures, including a wolf, a raven and an eagle with a frog in its mouth.
1998	Queen's Baton Relay for the XVI Commonwealth Games Kuala Lumpur, Malaysia	For the 1998 Commonwealth Games, Malaysia gave their own flavour to the Games. On opening ceremony night the Queen's Baton began its journey to the stadium by elephant. The baton was presented to Prince Edward by Malaysia's 1950 Commonwealth weightlifting gold medallist Koh Eng Tong. The Baton design was inspired by a traditional Malay artifact, the 'Gobek', which is a unique cylindrical areca nut-pounder widely used and displayed in Malay homes. The baton was produced by a local company, Mariwasa Kraftangan Sdn Bhd, using pure silver with gold trimming. It left Buckingham Palace on 9 March 1998.
2002	Queen's Baton Relay for the XVII Commonwealth Games Manchester, England	The 2002 Queen's Baton Relay (also known as Queen's Jubilee Baton Relay) was launched on Commonwealth Day, 11 March 2002, on the historic forecourt at Buckingham Palace. The baton traveled almost 59,000 miles via 23 commonwealth nations and territories over 87 days before opening the games on 25 July 2002. Cadbury was the presenting partner of the relay and sponsor of the games. The Baton was designed by a company called IDEO and was constructed of machined aluminium with the handle plated for conductivity. It weighed 1.69 kg (3 3/4 lb), reaches over 710 mm (28 in), and is 42.5 to 85 mm (1 3/4 to 3 1/4 in) in diameter. The Queen's message itself was held in an aluminium capsule inserted into the top of the Baton. On either side of the Baton were two sterling silver coins, designed by Mappin and Webb, which celebrated the City of Manchester as host of the XVII Commonwealth Games. It arrived at the City of Manchester Stadium carried by Aerialist Lindsey Butcher who descended to pass the baton to heptathon champion Denise Lewis. The baton was eventually presented to the Queen by David Beckham accompanied by Kirsty Howard who had been born with a rare heart condition.
2006	Queen's Baton Relay for the XVIII Commonwealth Games Melbourne, Australia	The 2006 Queen's Baton Relay was the world's longest, most inclusive relay, travelling more than 180,000 kilometres (110,000 miles) and visiting all 71 nations that then sent teams to the Commonwealth Games (Note: At that time, the Commonwealth of Nations had 53 members (the then current total was 54 after Rwanda's entry in 2009). However, the four Home Nations send separate teams to the Commonwealth Games, as do individual British Crown Dependencies, several British overseas territories, the Australian external territory of Norfolk Island, and two non-sovereign states in free association with New Zealand, the Cook Islands and Niue.) in one year and a day. The Queen's Baton Relay started, as it traditionally does, at Buckingham Palace and ended in Melbourne, Australia at the Melbourne Cricket Ground. It carried a message from the Queen to the Opening Ceremony of the Commonwealth Games. Fremantle Dockers Captain Matthew Pavlich carried the baton through Fremantle, he received the baton from community nominee and local businessman Peter Taliangis. The baton contained 71 lights on the front, representing the 71 member nations of the Commonwealth Games Federation. A video camera built into the front of the baton recorded continuously as the baton travelled, and a GPS tracker was fitted, so that the baton's location could be viewed live on the Commonwealth Games Website. The front face of the baton contained the detachable Queen's Message Button. The Button is a digital storage device, onto which the Queen's Message to the Athletes of the XVIII Commonwealth Games was encoded.
2010	Queen's Baton Relay for the XIX Commonwealth Games Delhi, India	The 2010 Queen's Baton Relay began as the Baton left Buckingham Palace on 29 October 2009, travelling throughout the 70 nations of the Commonwealth, reaching India on 25 June 2010 by crossing through Wagah from Pakistan. When the baton relay began at Buckingham Palace, the then-President of India, Pratibha Patil, was present. The Final Baton Runner Sushil Kumar handed over the baton to Prince Charles, who with President Pratibha Patil opened the Games. The baton was designed by Michael Foley, a graduate of the National Institute of Design. Made from aluminium twisted into a helix, it was coated with soils from the various regions of India, and held the Queen's message (printed on an 18 carat gold leaf, representing gold's qualities and symbolism of power in India) within a jeweled box. The baton also incorporated a video camera and microphone, LED lighting (which set its color scheme to match the flag of the nation it was travelling through), and GPS tracking.
2014	Queen's Baton Relay for the XX Commonwealth Games Glasgow, Scotland	The 2014 Queen's Baton Relay began its 190,000 km (120,000 mi) journey on 9 October 2013. The baton traveled via 70 nations and territories over 288 days before opening the games on 23 July 2014. At the ceremony, 32 inspiring volunteers from across Scotland carried the baton around Celtic Park Stadium after being nominated for giving their time to developing the nation's youth through sport. The baton was then passed to Sir Chris Hoy, who delivered it to President of the Commonwealth Games Federation Prince Imran and the Queen who then declared the Games open. The BBC provided coverage of the relay. Adventurer Mark Beaumont presented a series of documentaries filmed on the relay for BBC One Scotland, there were also weekly updates for BBC News and a BBC News website and blog written by Mark. The product design consultancy awarded the contract to the design of the 2014 Queen's Baton is a local Glasgow company called 4c Design. 4c Design wanted the 2014 baton to be true to the original intentions of the first relay and so wanted to focus the design around the Queen's handwritten message. Also rather than using cutting edge electronics, they choose to focus on cutting edge manufacturing. This all culminated in the Queen's message being internally illuminated to hint at the secret within, then surrounded by a titanium lattice framework that was grown using the latest additive manufacturing technology. At the top is a puzzle mechanism that dispenses granite gemstones to each of the Commonwealth nations and territories the baton visits, inviting them to join Glasgow at the Games. The puzzle mechanism also has a second function of keeping the message safely locked away until the opening ceremony, where the second stage of the puzzle will be unveiled. The handle of the Queen's Baton is made of Elm wood which came from the Isle of Cumbrae in Scotland. The Elm tree was felled by a local man called David Stevenson in the grounds of the Garrison House and the baton itself is crafted using an old boat building technique called bird mouthing.
2018	Queen's Baton Relay for the XXI Commonwealth Games Gold Coast, Australia	The 2018 Queen's Baton Relay was launched on Commonwealth Day, 13 March 2017, on the historic forecourt at Buckingham Palace, signalling the official countdown to the start of the Games. Accompanied by the Duke of Edinburgh and Prince Edward The Earl of Wessex, Her Majesty Queen Elizabeth II heralded the start of the relay by placing her 'message to the Commonwealth and its athletes' into the distinctive loop-design Queen's Baton which then set off on its journey around the globe. It traveled for 388 days, spending time in every nation and territory of the Commonwealth. The Gold Coast 2018 Queen's Baton Relay was the longest in Commonwealth Games history. Covering 230,000 km (140,000 mi) over 388 days, the baton made its way through the six Commonwealth regions of Africa, the Americas, the Caribbean, Europe, Asia and Oceania. The baton landed on Australian soil in December 2017 and then spent 100 days travelling through Australia, finishing its journey at the Opening Ceremony on 4 April 2018, where the message was removed from the Baton and read aloud by Charles, Prince of Wales. For the first time, the Queen's baton was presented at the Commonwealth Youth Games during its sixth edition in 2017 which were held in Nassau, Bahamas. The baton for the Gold Coast 2018 was designed by Brisbane-based company Designworks to reflect the local culture and life of Queensland. Designed for each Games by the host nation, the 2018 Queen's Baton has been made using macadamia wood and reclaimed plastic, sourced from Gold Coast waterways, and inspired by the region's vibrant spirit and indigenous heritage.
2022	Queen's Baton Relay for the XXII Commonwealth Games Birmingham, England	The 2022 Queen's Baton Relay started on 7 October 2021 at Buckingham Palace. It was the last baton relay before the death of Queen Elizabeth II on 8 September in the same year.
2026	King's Baton Relay for the XXIII Commonwealth Games Glasgow, Scotland	The 2026 King's Baton Relay was the first baton relay under the reign of King Charles III (since 8 September 2022). It began on 10 March 2025 at Buckingham Palace. For the first time, every Commonwealth nation and territory received their own batons.
2030	King's Baton Relay for the XXIV Commonwealth Games Amdavad, India	The 2030 King's Baton Relay will begin in 2029.

== Final Baton Runners ==
Games	Baton-carrier
Cardiff 1958	Ken Jones
Perth 1962	Phil Afford
Kingston 1966	Keith Gardner, Paul Foreman, Ernle Haisley, Laurie Khan, Mel Spence
Edinburgh 1970	Eileen Coughlan
Christchurch 1974	Sylvia Potts
Edmonton 1978	Diane Jones-Konihowski
Brisbane 1982	Raelene Boyle
Edinburgh 1986	Allan Wells
Auckland 1990	Peter Snell
Victoria 1994	Myriam Bédard
Kuala Lumpur 1998	Koh Eng Tong
Manchester 2002	David Beckham and Kirsty Howard
Melbourne 2006	John Landy
Delhi 2010	Sushil Kumar
Glasgow 2014	Sir Chris Hoy
Gold Coast 2018	Sally Pearson
Birmingham 2022	Denise Lewis
Glasgow 2026	Kieron Achara, Hannah Miley and Neil Fachie
Amdavad 2030	TBA

== See also ==
- Olympic Flame
