= Together We Are One =

2006 single by Delta Goodrem

Single by Delta Goodrem

from the album Commonwealth Games: Melbourne 2006 Opening Ceremony
- B-side: "Fragile" (live); "Last Night on Earth" (live)
- Released: 3 April 2006
- Recorded: 2006
- Length: 4:15
- Label: Epic
- Songwriters: Guy Chambers; Delta Goodrem; Brian McFadden
- Producers: Guy Chambers; Richard Flack

Delta Goodrem singles chronology
"Be Strong" (2005)	"Together We Are One" (2006)	"In This Life" (2007)

Audio sample
- "Together We Are One": file; help

Music video
- "Together We Are One" on YouTube

"Together We Are One" is a song written by Guy Chambers, Delta Goodrem and Brian McFadden, produced by Guy Chambers and Richard Flack for the album Commonwealth Games: Melbourne 2006 Opening Ceremony (2006). Due to the positive response that Goodrem received when performing the song live for the 2006 Commonwealth Games, she was then asked to record the song as a commercial single. She states the song is "for the athletes and all of us to come together and reach for our dreams and goals." It was released as a CD single in Australia on 3 April 2006 and had success on the charts, peaking at number two.

Goodrem states she was "honoured" when she was asked to write a song for the 2006 Commonwealth Games and to take part in the event itself "was such an amazing experience." She states that it is her favourite kind of song to write, with the inspiring lyrics, she says "When I sat down to write the song I was just hoping it was something that people would enjoy." She also wanted to write a tribute to all the participants in the games, "to say after all the toil, and the blood, sweat and tears, the time has finally arrived for them to be rewarded" that "we're all united by this moment." She performed the song live at the 2006 Commonwealth Games opening ceremony on 15 March 2006 which was watched by over four million viewers in Australia. The music video for the single is a montage of Goodrem's performance at the 2006 Commonwealth Games Opening Ceremony as well as some sporting highlights of the Games.

"Together We Are One" had commercial success in Australia. In early April 2006, it debuted at number two on the Australian ARIA Singles Chart, being held off the top spot by "Flaunt It" by TV Rock. The single spent seventeen weeks in the top fifty and spent twenty-three weeks in the top one hundred. The Australian Recording Industry Association awarded the single a gold certification for shipping 35,000 copies and went to become the forty-first highest selling single in Australia for 2006.

== Track listing ==
Australian single

1. "Together We Are One" – 4:14
2. "Fragile" (live at Visualise Tour 2005) – 3:30
3. "Last Night on Earth" (live at Visualise Tour 2005) – 4:21
4. "Together We Are One" (Celebration remix) – 4:14 – iTunes bonus track

== Charts ==
=== Weekly charts ===
Chart (2006)	Peak position
Australia (ARIA)	2

=== Year-end charts ===
Chart (2006)	Position
Australia (ARIA)	41

== Certifications ==
Region	Certification	Certified units/sales
Australia (ARIA)	Gold	35,000^{^}
^{^} Shipments figures based on certification alone.

== Cover versions ==
- The song has appeared on the 2006 version of American Idol as a group song for the top five finalists (Taylor Hicks, Katharine McPhee, Elliott Yamin, Chris Daughtry, and Paris Bennett).
- The song was again performed on the American Idol Season 9 finale as a farewell tribute to Simon Cowell together by seven former American Idol champions: Kelly Clarkson, Ruben Studdard, Fantasia Barrino, Carrie Underwood, Jordin Sparks, Taylor Hicks, and Kris Allen and more than 15 past contestants of American Idol.
- Greg Gould, Stellar Perry and Nathan Foley recorded and released a cover of the song on World Mental Health Day in 2021.

== See also ==
- 2006 Commonwealth Games
- 2006 Commonwealth Games Opening Ceremony
