= 2006 Commonwealth Games closing ceremony =

The closing ceremony of the 2006 Commonwealth Games was held at the Melbourne Cricket Ground in Melbourne, Victoria, Australia on 26 March 2006.

== Performances ==
=== Countdown ===
The ceremony began with a countdown at the screen starting at 17, footage from previous games appeared with Melbourne at the end complete with an image of fireworks with numbers between 17 and 1 being from previous games until 0 from currents games

- 17 - 1930 Hamilton
- 16 - 1934 London
- 15 - 1938 Sydney
- 14 - 1950 Auckland
- 13 - 1954 Vancouver
- 12 - 1958 Cardiff
- 11 - 1962 Perth
- 10 - 1966 Kingston
- 9 - 1970 Edinburgh
- 8 - 1974 Christchurch
- 7 - 1978 Edmonton
- 6 - 1982 Brisbane
- 5 - 1986 Edinburgh
- 4 - 1990 Auckland
- 3 - 1994 Victoria
- 2 - 1998 Kuala Lumpur
- 1 - 2002 Manchester

=== An Ordinary Sunday in Melbourne ===
The ceremony began with a fireworks show. This was followed by Grinspoon's Pat Davern suspended on the Great Southern Stand of the Melbourne Cricket Ground (MCG) playing a guitar (equipped with pyrotechnics which produced sparks) whilst being lowered onto the stadium ground, giving a rock concert feel to the closing ceremony. Grinspoon performed their hits Hard Act To Follow and Better Off Alone. During the performance under 18 TAC Cup Australian rules football players, accompanied by several contemporary key figures of the sport entered through a banner, running out into formation. Ballerinas dressed in club colours followed.

Melbourne musician Paul Kelly performed Leaps and Bounds, while various costumed performers representing Melburnians entered the arena, in addition to a number of significant Melbourne landmark icons such as Flinders Street station, The Skipping Girl Vinegar Sign, St Kilda's Luna Park facade, the Royal Exhibition Building, the Melbourne Cup and the Victorian Arts Centre Spire.

Ben Lee then performed a tribute to Melbourne's multicultural nature, performing "We're All in This Together" while people (known on-site as "Multis") held photoboards of their ancestors from the many nationalities of Melburnians and created a "wall" with them. (Note: not all the people were holding their own ancestors. Most were assigned random photos. Those who had submitted photos got to hold their own.) Nearing the end of Ben Lee's song, the "Multis" took out large red and yellow paper flowers, alluding to Lee's upcoming video for the song. During the song, girls dressed in pink costumes, reminiscent of a 1989 Kylie Minogue, 1989 Hand in Your Heart videoclip danced with large sweetheart lollies. These girls were known on-site as the "sweetheart girls".

The Bodyrockers performed their hit I Like the Way (You Move) while the "multis" and "sweetheart girls" performed separate dances. Towards the end of the song, the multis moved from the front of the stage to the middle, flipping their boards over and revealing a giant moving version of Federation Square, also using the boards to create an audience wave (Mexican wave). They finished up, holding poses, as fireworks were set off around the MCG. Fireworks were alluded to during the ceremony, with small explosions taking place throughout the event.

The volunteers were then welcomed and thanked, with 14,000 being invited to the closing ceremony, while a poem was read out listing a few more of Melbourne's icons, such as the Esplanade Hotel, Graham Kennedy and Shane Warne. The volunteers were honoured as being an integral part of the games success.

Confetti snow rained down on the stage, representing the fickle nature of Melbourne's weather, as Sarah Blasko performed a Neil Finn and Crowded House hit, "Don't Dream It's Over". Paul Kelly and the Stormwater Boys played "Rally around the Drum", before flag bearers for each country raised flags, in the same order of continental region that they had done in the opening ceremony, starting with England and finishing with Australia. An illuminated globe suspended in the centre was lowered with Australia, upside down, highlighted in red, and on top of the world. Melbourne City Council's mayor, Lord Mayor John So was included in the proceedings, to rapturous applause of the crowd, who continued to cheer as his name was read out throughout the ceremony.

The Commonwealth Games Ceremonial Flag was lowered by workers representing the Emergency Services of Victoria to the backing of a Wurundjeri Indigenous traditional song performed by the Gondwana Voices, a national youth choir.

=== Handover Delhi 2010 ===
The ceremony took a distinct change, in acknowledgment of the 2010 Commonwealth Games which will be held in Delhi. A short promotional video was displayed extolling the virtues of India. The stage was filled with the sights and sounds of the Bollywood film culture, with colour and dance predominant features. Several colourful performances were displayed, such as the lively bhangra by Rani Mukherjee and Saif Ali Khan as well as a dance by Aishwarya Rai Miss World 1994.

The 2010 Delhi Games mascot, Shera the Friendly Tiger was presented to public and paraded around the stage waving at the crowd, accompanied by the Miss Universe 2000, Lara Dutta and the Miss World 2000, Priyanka Chopra. Then the bidding theme song was performed on stage. The song was sung by popular Indian singers Sonu Nigam, Shreya Ghoshal, Sunidhi Chauhan and Shiamak Davar. The latter is also a famous dance choreographer in India. The song, called "Delhi Chalein" and invited everyone to the next Commonwealth Games in Delhi.

=== David Dixon Award ===
The David Dixon Award, for Best and Fairest, was awarded to Indian Commonwealth Games Team shooter, Samaresh Jung. As the Indian shooter had already returned to India, the award trophy was handed over to an Indian Olympic Association official as the representative.

=== Closing of the games ===
Prince Edward, Earl of Wessex then officially closed the Games.

=== Concluding performances ===
The Boy and White Duck from the opening ceremony returned and the boy, who was holding the duck, went down a trapdoor at the centre of the stage and disappeared from sight, symbolizing the closing of the 2006 Games.

Casey Donovan, the winner of the 2004 Australian Idol, performed Better To Love.

Michael Klim then came on stage to respond on behalf of the athletes. He was interrupted, mid-sentence, by Barry Humphries (as Dame Edna Everage who was live from her London home). Michael Klim's interrupted speech was never finished.

Dame Edna Everage read a message, and a poem and then sang a song in tribute to Melbourne, via a live video, while 1,000 so-called "Commonwealth Dames", wearing various costumes, some from the beginning of the show, performed on the circular stage, waving gladioli and dancing. During this, many fireworks were set off, finally ending in a large human formation in the shape of Dame Edna's trademark glasses.

After this performance, the athletes were released to return to the stadium field and the party began around the centre stage, many of them taking advantage of the informal procedures to take photos, and celebrate in the festivities. Then a select number of outer circle volunteers speared inwards to form a heart-shaped enclosure, while Melbourne's larger skyscrapers set fireworks alight - mirroring the opening ceremony. The floating fishes of the Yarra River were illuminated one final time. The official goodbye was announced, and the ceremony ended.

The president of the Commonwealth Games Committee, Mike Fennell, declared to the crowd, "Melbourne, you are simply the best!"

The stage then cleared, with the volunteers surrounding the centre platform where John Farnham and his band appeared to deliver a four-song set, comprising his hits "Age of Reason", "I Remember When I Was Young", "Playing to Win" and "You're the Voice".

A month after the ceremony, all the Melbourne performers received certificates of participation.

== Music ==
Following were the songs that were played or performed at the closing ceremony.

1. "Fanfare for H.R.H. the Earl of Wessex" – Chong Lim & The Games Symphony Orchestra
2. "Guitar Fanfare" – Pat Davern
3. "In Full Flight" – Chong Lim & The Games Symphony Orchestra
4. "Hard Act to Follow" – Grinspoon
5. "Better Off Alone" – Grinspoon
6. "Leaps & Bounds" – Paul Kelly & The Boon Companions
7. "We're All in This Together" – Ben Lee
8. "I Like the Way" (radio edit) – BodyRockers
9. "Prelude to Don't Dream It's Over" – Sarah Blasko
10. "Don't Dream It's Over" – Sarah Blasko
11. "Rally Round the Drum" – Paul Kelly & The Stormwater Boys
12. "Beams" – The Presets
13. "Menenaringee" – Chong Lim, The Games Symphony Orchestra featuring Corey Kirk, Gondwana Voices & Cantillation
14. "The Athlete's Fanfare" – Chong Lim & The Games Symphony Orchestra
15. "Thank You Delhi" – Chong Lim & The Games Symphony Orchestra
16. "Goodbye Melbourne" – Chong Lim & The Games Symphony Orchestra
17. "Better to Love" – Casey Donovan
18. "The March of the Gladioli" – Chong Lim & The Games Symphony Orchestra
19. "We've Made the Most of Melbourne" – Dame Edna Everage
20. "Faith & Hope: Fireworks Overture for Melbourne" – Chong Lim & The Games Symphony Orchestra
21. "Age of Reason" – John Farnham
22. "I Remember When I Was Young" – John Farnham
23. "Playing to Win" – John Farnham
24. "You're the Voice" – John Farnham

== See also ==
- 2006 Commonwealth Games opening ceremony
- 2018 Commonwealth Games closing ceremony
