= Mau Power =

Hip-hop artist from Torres Strait

Mau Power (Patrick Mau)
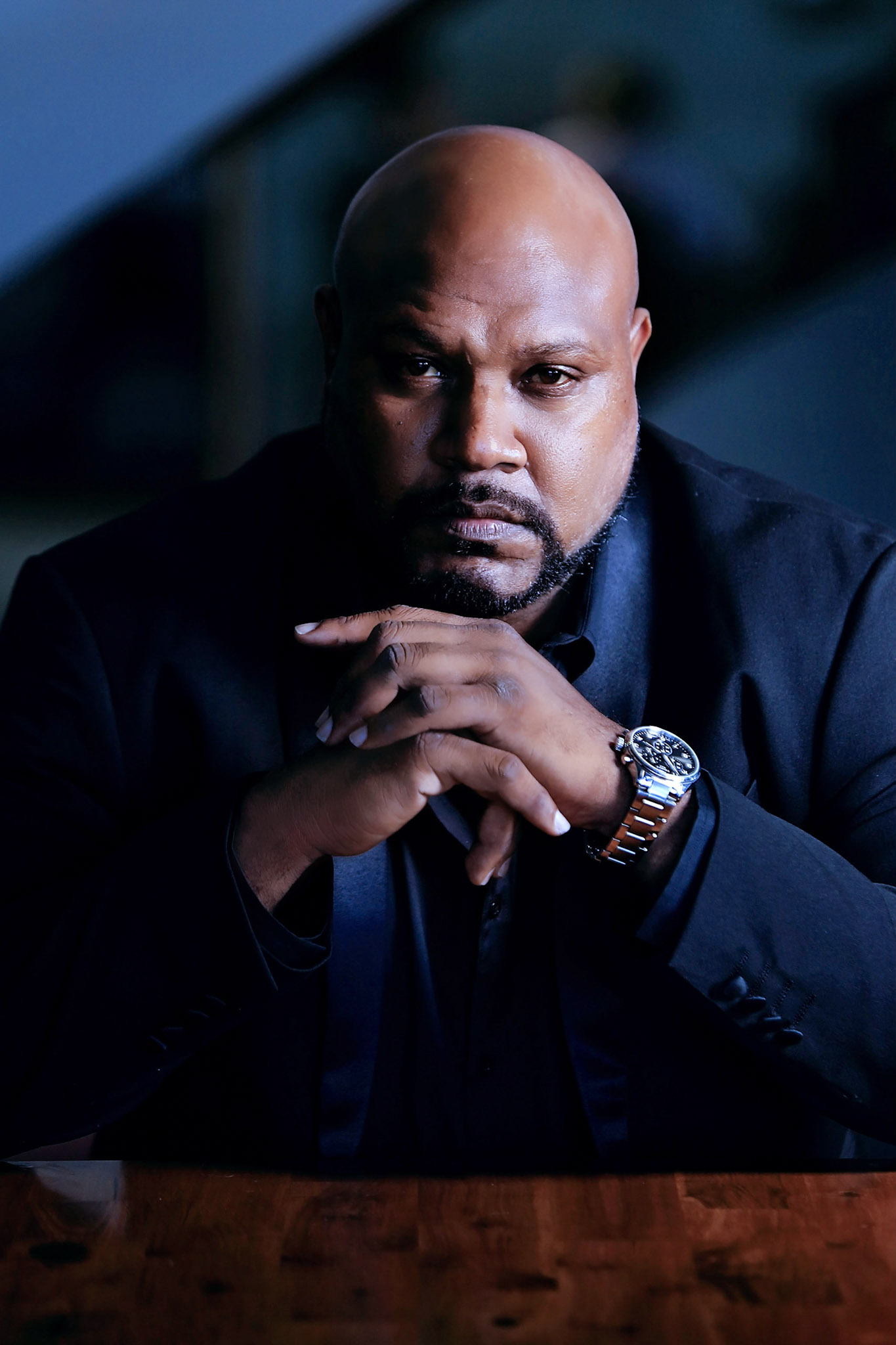
- Patrick Mau

Background information
- Born: Patrick James Mau
- Origin: Torres Strait Islands, Australia
- Genres: Hip hop
- Occupation: Rapper
- Years active: 2006 - present
- Website: www.maupower.com

Mau Power, born Patrick James Mau, is a hip hop artist from Thursday Island in the Torres Strait and is the first Australian rapper to tour from this region. He is also the founder and executive director of One Blood Hidden Image, the first Torres Strait independent record distribution label, film production and media company.

== Career ==
While he recorded his first song in Brisbane when he was 17 and attending the University of Southern Queensland.

In 2012, Mau was a producer for the National Indigenous Television (NITV) Our Stories.

Mau's second album The Show Will Go On, an autobiography, was released in 2014 after being recorded over a period of two years. The album included a remake of "My Island Home", which he performed with Christine Anu at the 2018 Commonwealth Games Opening Ceremony in Australia on the Gold Coast.

In 2015, Mau was one selected as of the emerging Indigenous film producers to be part of the Screen Australia Indigenous Producers Initiative. He has also produced documentaries and music videos for NITV, SBS, ABC and online platforms. His production company also produces promotional and corporate films for health and educational organisations.

Mau has toured nationally and internationally and also collaborated with Australian musicians Archie Roach and Christine Anu. Eddie Mabo’s daughter, Gail Mabo, selected Mau to sing an ode she wrote to her father on the 20th anniversary of the Mabo decision, which overturned the notion of terra nullius in Australia.

On 26 January 2020, Mau was a guest performer at the Sydney Indigenous Smoking Ceremony on Australia Day.

In July 2020, he was nominated for two awards at the National Indigenous Music Awards.

== Personal ==
Mau Power, who grew up on Thursday Island in the Torres Strait, is a Dhoebaw man of the Guda Malullgal nations and is guided by two cultures: Indigeous (Torres Strait Islander), and hip hop.

He was jailed in 2001 for nine months for a street fight and said this jail time made him reflect on his life, and he decided to focus on his music, which he said is dedicated to inspiring others.

== Discography ==
=== Studio albums ===
List of studio albums
| Title | Details |
|---|---|
| Two Shades of Grey | Released: 2008; Label: Mau Power; Format: DD |
| The Show Will Go On | Released: July 2014; Label: Mau Power; Format: DD |
| Blue Lotus Awakening | Released: July 2019; Label: One Blood Hidden; Format: DD |

=== Singles ===
List of singles as lead artist
| Title | Year | Album |
|---|---|---|
| "My Blood, My People" | 2006 | Two Shades of Grey |
| "One Blood, Hidden Image" | 2008 | Two Shades of Grey |
| "Warupau Nur (Sing Strong)" (featuring King Kadu) | 2013 | The Show Will Go On |
| "My Island Home" | 2014 | The Show Will Go On |
| "Freedom" (featuring Archie Roach) | 2014 | The Show Will Go On |
| "Koiki" (featuring Radical Son) | 2017 | Blue Lotus Awakening |
| "Arrived" (featuring Marcus Corowa) | 2019 | Blue Lotus Awakening |
| "Warrior Dance" (featuring Astro Brim) | 2020 | Blue Lotus Awakening |

== Awards and nominations ==
=== National Indigenous Music Awards ===
The National Indigenous Music Awards (NIMA) is an annual award ceremony and recognises excellence, dedication, innovation and outstanding contribution to the Northern Territory music industry.

| Year | Nominee / work | Award | Result |
|---|---|---|---|
| 2020 | "Himself" | Artist of the Year | Nominated |
| 2020 | Blue Lotus the Awakening | Album of the Year | Nominated |

=== J Awards ===
The J Awards are an annual series of Australian music awards that were established by the Australian Broadcasting Corporation's youth-focused radio station Triple J. They commenced in 2005.

| Year | Nominee / work | Award | Result |
|---|---|---|---|
| J Awards of 2020 | Jaguar Jonze | Unearthed Artist of the Year | Nominated |

=== Queensland Music Awards ===
The Queensland Music Awards (previously known as Q Song Awards) are annual awards celebrating Queensland, Australia's brightest emerging artists and established legends. They commenced in 2006.

| Year | Nominee / work | Award | Result (wins only) |
|---|---|---|---|
| 2020 | "Arrived" (featuring Marcus Corowa) | Indigenous Song of the Year | Won |
