= Louise Martin (sports administrator) =

Scottish sports administrator

Dame Louise Martin DBE

8th President of the Commonwealth Games Federation
- In office 2015–2023
- Preceded by: Prince Tunku Imran of Negeri Sembilan
- Succeeded by: Chris Jenkins

Personal details
- Born: Louise Livingstone Campbell; 1946 (age 79–80) Dunfermline, Scotland
- Education: Queen Margaret University, Edinburgh

Dame Louise Livingstone Martin DBE (née Campbell; born 1946) was the President of the Commonwealth Games Federation (CGF). She is also a Scottish sports administrator, retired athlete, nutritionist and former educator. She has previously chaired the Commonwealth Games Council for Scotland and SportScotland, headed Scotland's successful bid to host the 2014 Commonwealth Games and played a key role in their organisation.

== Career ==
Martin was born in 1946 in Dunfermline. She came to prominence aged 14, after breaking the Scottish record for the 110 yards backstroke. She was a member of the Dunfermline Carnegie Swimming Club and was selected for the British trials for the 1960 Summer Olympics and broke the Scottish 100 yards backstroke record in November 1960.

She represented the 1962 Scottish Team, aged 16, at the 1962 British Empire and Commonwealth Games in Perth, Australia, competing in the 110 yards and 220 yards backstroke event and reached the finals in both.

She subsequently attended the Edinburgh College of Domestic Science (Queen Margaret University), receiving a diploma in domestic science and food nutrition. She lectured there from 1969 to 1972, before teaching at Glenrothes High School and then, from 1973, at the Millburn Academy. She married in 1973, adopting her husband Ian's surname, stopped teaching in 1975, and had two children.

Martin then turned her skills to sports coaching and management. In 1990, she became a tutor with the National Coaching Foundation. She was President of Scottish Gymnastics from 1993 until 1999, and progressed to join the board of the Commonwealth Games Council for Scotland in 1995; four years later, she became its first female chair, serving until 2007. As chair, she was instrumental in securing Glasgow's bid to host the 2014 Commonwealth Games, and as vice-chair of the organising committee was "a hugely influential figure in the successful delivery of the Games". She also chaired SportScotland from 2008 until 2016, during which time she was responsible for managing an increased budget ahead of the 2012 Summer Olympics and the 2014 Commonwealth Games, including £30 million of investment in new facilities. She also served as the Secretary of the CGF from 1999 to 2015, and since 2015 has been the CGF's president.

On 30 August 2023, the Commonwealth Games Federation has announced that Martin would retire from the role as Commonwealth Games Federation President after 8 years and she was succeeded by Welshman Chris Jenkins on 15 November 2023.

== Honours and awards ==
In the 2003 New Year Honours, Martin was appointed a Commander of the Order of the British Empire "for services to the Commonwealth Games"; she was promoted to Dame Commander in the 2019 New Year Honours "for services to sport". She holds honorary degrees from Abertay University, Glasgow Caledonian University, the University of Stirling, the University of Strathclyde, Heriot-Watt University and the University of the West of Scotland. In 2002, she was named UK Sports Administrator of the Year by The Sunday Times.

== See also ==
- Louise Martin - Athlete profile, Commonwealth Games Federation.
