= 2006 Commonwealth Games opening ceremony =

Sporting event delegation

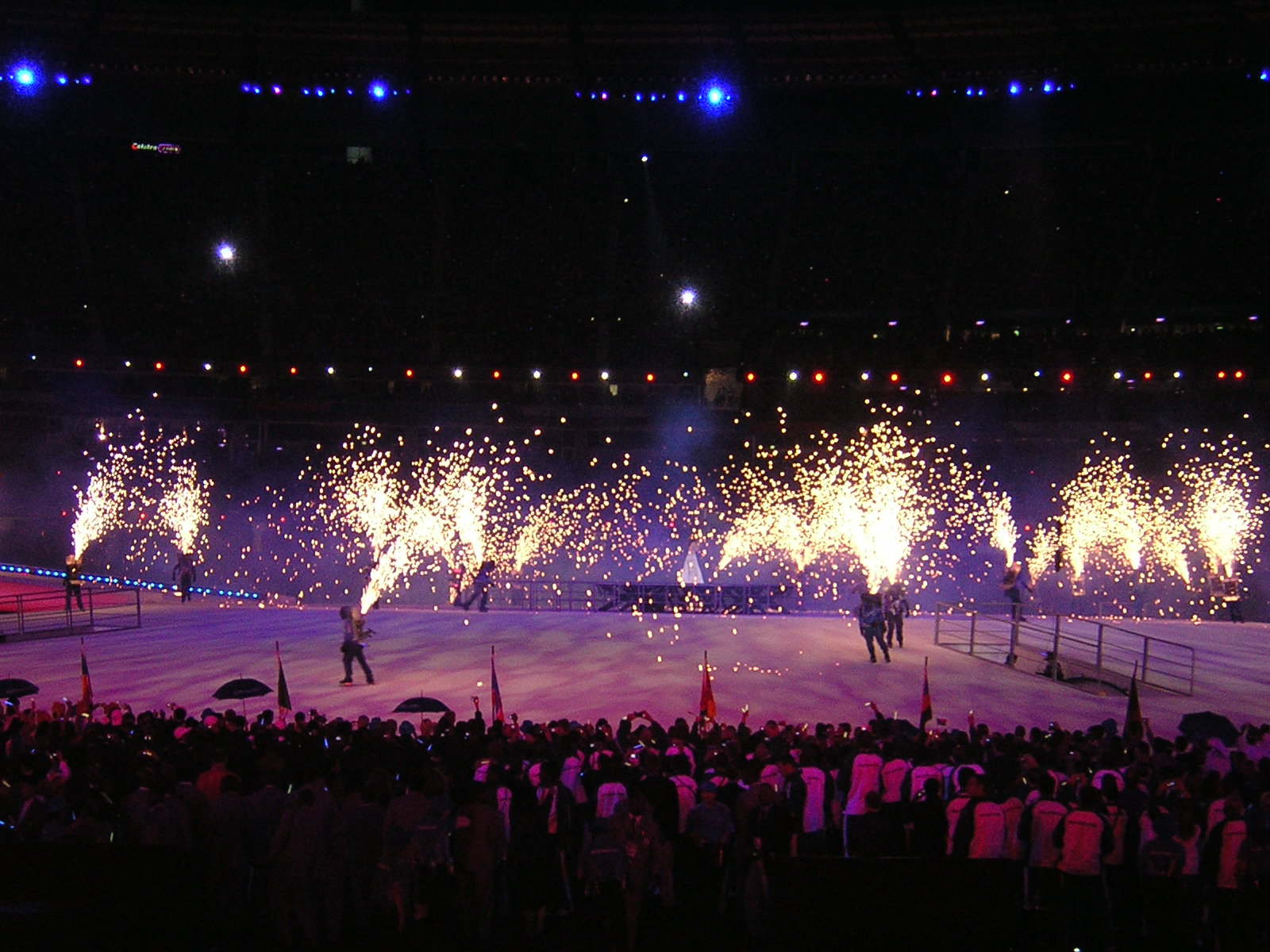
- Date: 15 March 2006; 20 years ago
- Time: 20:00–22:30 AEST
- Location: Melbourne, Australia; 37°49′12″S 144°59′0″E
- Filmed by: Nine Network (GTV)

The Opening Ceremony of the 2006 Commonwealth Games was held on 15 March 2006 at the Melbourne Cricket Ground in Melbourne, Victoria, Australia. The ceremony was conceived and produced by Jack Morton Worldwide

== Description ==
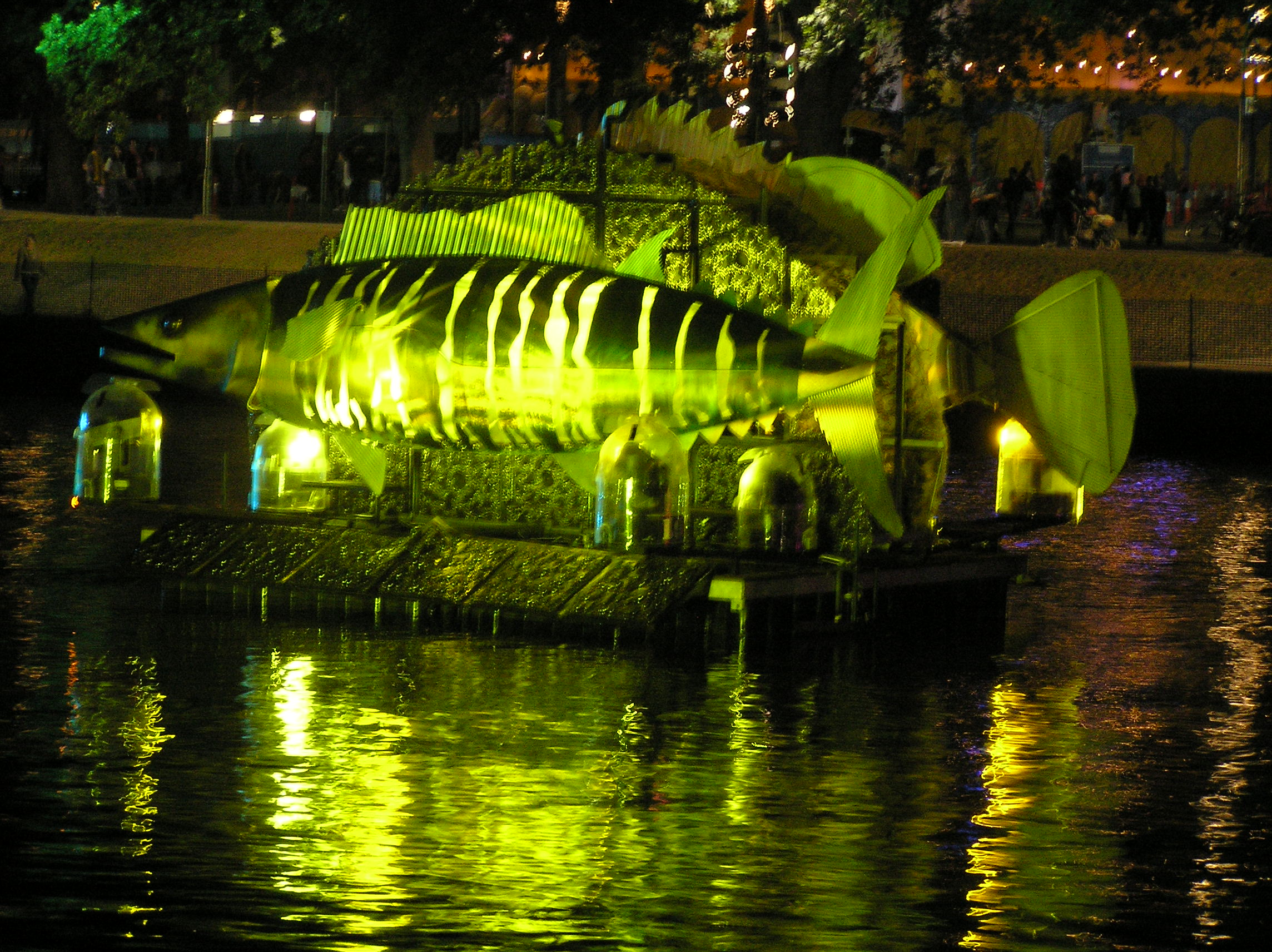
A boat in the Yarra River with an artificial fish over it, featuring the culture of one of 71 participating nation at the 2006 Commonwealth Games.

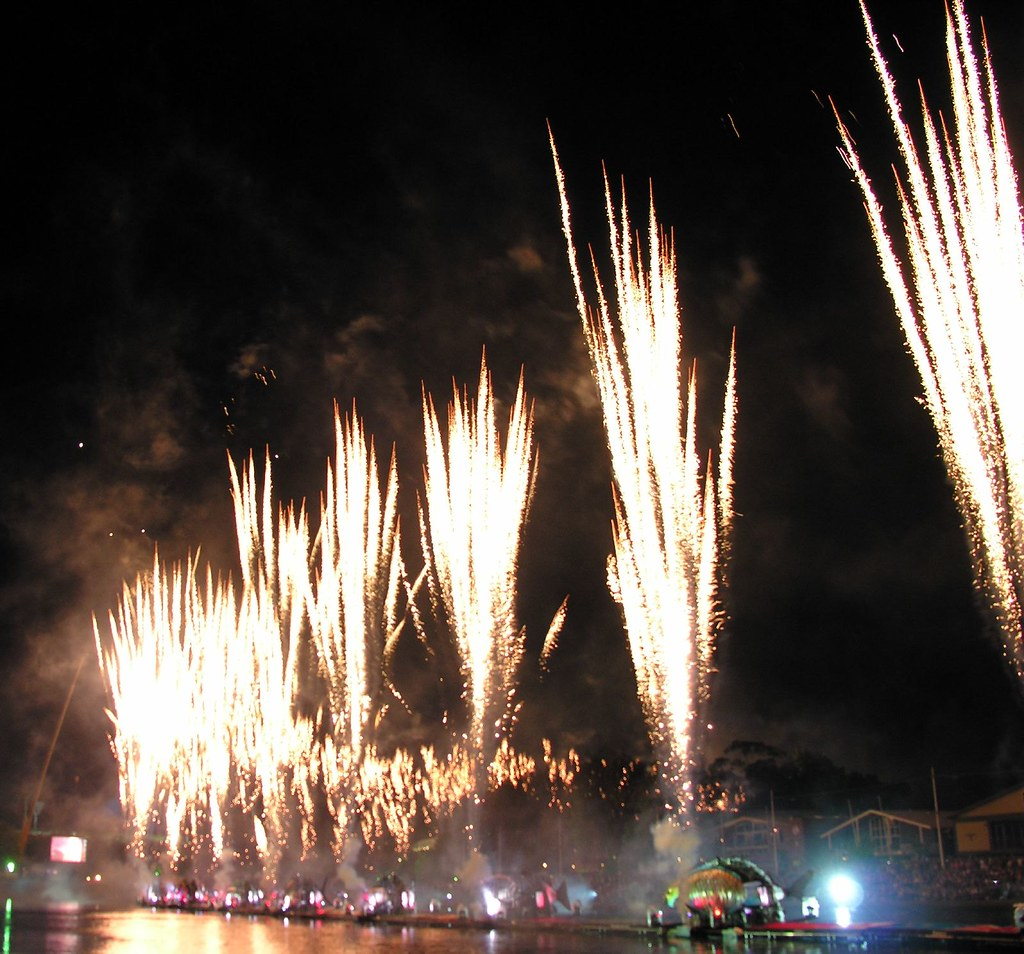
Fireworks at the Yarra River during the opening ceremony

=== Countdown ===
A 1930 Hamilton-1934 London-1938 Sydney-1950 Auckland-1954 Vancouver-1958 Cardiff-1962 Perth-1966 Kingston-1970 Edinburgh-1974 Christchurch-1978 Edmonton-1982 Brisbane-1986 Edinburgh-1990 Auckland-1994 Victoria-1998 Kuala Lumpur-2002 Manchester-2006 Melbourne countdown projection on the floor of the stage was set to the melody of "Countdown" was instrumental by Melbourne Symphony Orchestra and label by Sony BMG Music Entertainment Australia as temporary stage on the playing ground of the Melbourne Cricket Ground in Melbourne, Victoria, Australia lighting up with previous host cities.

=== Welcome ===
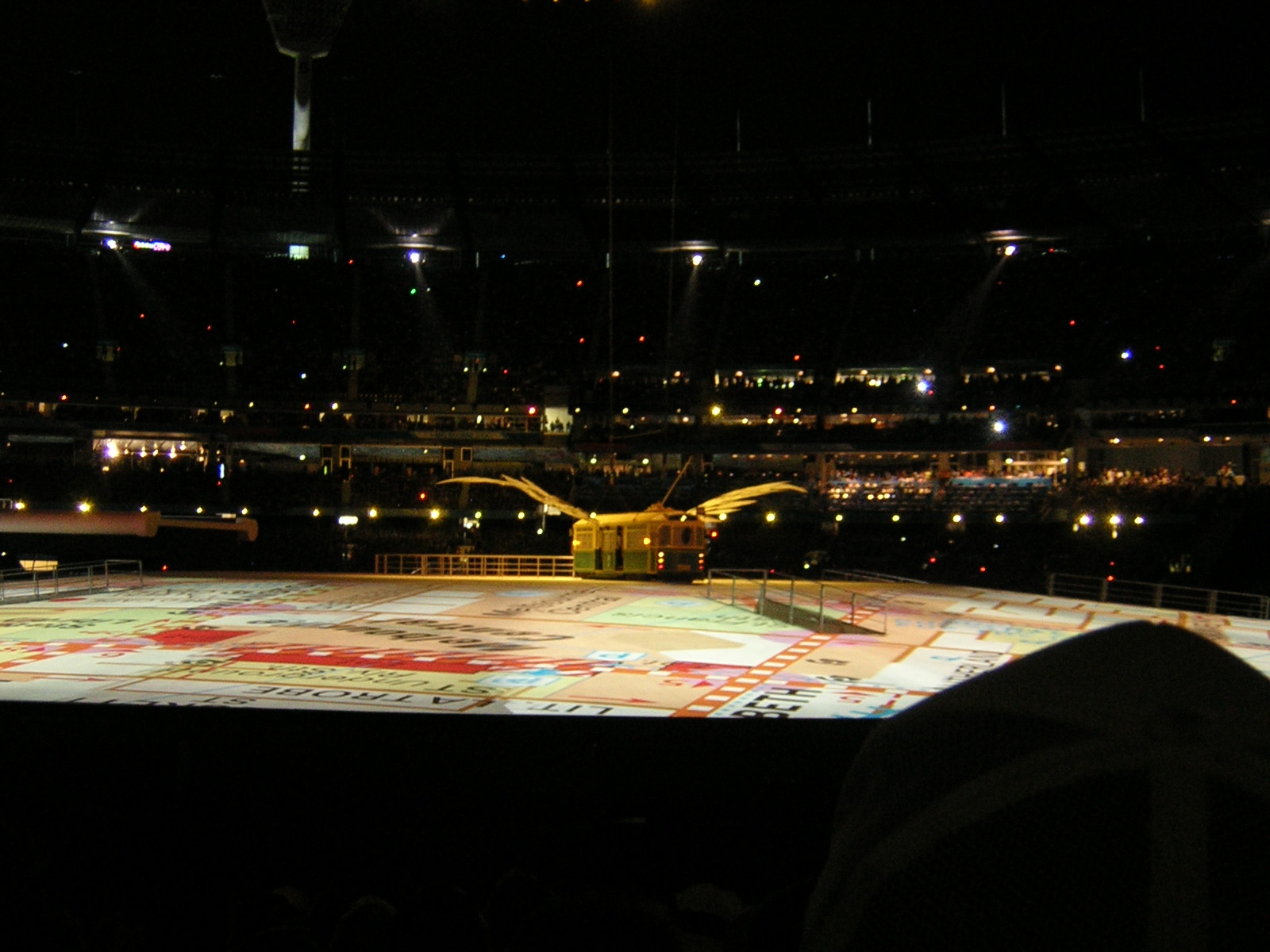
The "flying tram" featured in the Opening Ceremony, sitting on a Melbourne street map.

After countdown and ceremony began with the flag of Australia (current host), England (previous host) and India (next host) were raised. Surf boats which represented each of the past 18 host cities were on the Yarra River as were flags of the participating countries. A W-class Melbourne tram with wings attached was lowered into the stadium. A performance followed based on a poem by Michael Leunig, involving a boy with a duck which was an artificial one at first, and koalas, (people dressed in koala 'suits'). At the end of the display, the boy came into the Stadium with a real white duck. The opening ceremony had many themes, including Melbourne's Wurundjeri Indigenous heritage and Melbourne's fickle weather. The role of the boy was performed by 12-year-old (almost 13) Sean Whitford, who had been selected from thousands of candidates. Australian rock band The Church played Under The Milky Way to accompany a performance by the Australian Ballet, with aerial work performed by students of the National Institute of Circus Arts (NICA).

The Indigenous segment of the opening ceremony was called My Skin, My Life, and was directed by Wesley Enoch. Kirk Page contributed to the choreography. A CD was produced of the music of the ceremony, which included a song from the Indigenous segment with lyrics by Joy Murphy Wandin and sung by David Page.

=== Parade of nations ===
Contrary to tradition, the nations did not enter the stadium in alphabetical order, but by regions of the Commonwealth. European nations entered the stadium first, followed by those from Africa, Asia, the Americas, the Caribbean and finally, Oceania. English athletes and officials entered the stadium first (as the host of the 2002 Commonwealth Games in Manchester) while the host nation, Australia entered last. The athletes entered with The Cat Empire playing a specially written musical 'set', tailoring music to specific regions.

=== Queen's baton ===
The final leg of the Queen's Baton Relay included the baton being handed to the 16 captains of the Australian Football League across the floating flags and fish along the Yarra River. After each of the captains had carried the baton, the last of the captains (David Neitz) handed the baton to Ron Barassi, who walked on a semi submerged pontoon, giving the effect that he was walking on water (some commentators joked that the stunt "proved what most of us suspected"). Barassi then handed the baton to Herb Elliott.

=== CGF flag hoist ===
The Commonwealth Games Federation flag was then brought into the stadium by eight Young Australian of the Year recipients. The athlete's oath was taken by Adam Pine.

=== Queen's birthday celebration ===
Harry White, a 13-year-old boy, who was youth ambassador, presented a message to Queen Elizabeth II, Queen of Australia. After a rather controversial furore before the start of the Games regarding the decision by the Organising Committee not to include God Save the Queen in the Opening Ceremony, a Happy Birthday medley was sung by Dame Kiri Te Kanawa in tribute of the Queen's 80th birthday (37 days hence), ending with eight bars from God Save the Queen. Michael Fennel, the president of the Commonwealth Games Federation then spoke.

=== Queen's baton handover ===
The final bearers of the Queen's Baton were all former elite world-class athletes who had successfully competed at both the Olympic Games and Commonwealth Games. They were:

- Cathy Freeman (who lit the Olympic Flame at the 2000 Sydney Olympics), who brought the Queen's Baton into the stadium, and then handed the baton to
- Ron Clarke (who lit the Olympic Flame at the 1956 Melbourne Olympics), who then handed the baton to
- Marjorie Jackson-Nelson, then-Governor of South Australia, who then handed the baton to
- John Landy, then-Governor of Victoria, who presented the Queen's Baton to The Queen.

=== Opening of the games ===
The Queen then read the message of greeting which she had placed in the baton (366 days earlier on Commonwealth Day, 14 March 2005), declaring the games open.

=== In the end ===
Australian singer Delta Goodrem sang Together We Are One, the theme song for the 2006 games while many fireworks were ignited, within the stadium, on the backs on roller-bladers circling the singer, and fireworks were also ignited on the banks of the Yarra, as well as the floating pontoons, and Melbourne's larger skyscrapers.

== Ceremony key team ==
The ceremonies were produced by Jack Morton, Artistic Director and Executive Producer Andrew Walsh with Producers David Proctor (Opening Ceremony), Adam Charles (Closing Ceremony) and Keith Tucker (River).

== CD ==
A CD was produced of the music of the ceremony, which includes all of the official music composed by Christopher Gordon, as well as the Indigenous segment mentioned above and other songs.

== Parade of Nations ==
In a break of tradition the teams entered the Melbourne Cricket Ground in the opening ceremony of the 2006 Commonwealth Games by regions, instead of by alphabetical order.

Last host nation

England - 2002 Commonwealth Games in Manchester.

=== Europe ===
Cyprus | Gibraltar | Guernsey | Isle of Man | Jersey | Malta | Northern Ireland | Scotland | Wales

Then followed the African countries.

Botswana | Cameroon | The Gambia | Ghana | Kenya | Lesotho | (Malawi) Malaŵi | Mauritius | Mozambique | Namibia | Nigeria | Seychelles | Sierra Leone | South Africa | (Eswatini) Swaziland | Uganda | United Republic of Tanzania | Zambia

=== Asia ===
Bangladesh | Brunei Darussalam | India | Malaysia | Maldives | Pakistan | Singapore | Sri Lanka

=== America ===
Belize | Bermuda | Canada | Falkland Islands | Guyana | (Saint Helena) St Helena

=== Caribbean ===
Anguilla | Antigua and Barbuda | (The Bahamas) Bahamas | Barbados | British Virgin Islands | Cayman Islands | Dominica | Grenada | Jamaica | Montserrat | (Saint Kitts and Nevis) St Kitts & Nevis | Saint Lucia | (Saint Vincent and the Grenadines) St Vincent & the Grenadines | (Trinidad and Tobago) Trinidad & Tobago | (Turks and Caicos Islands) Turks & Caicos

=== Oceania ===
Cook Islands | Fiji | Kiribati | Nauru | New Zealand | Niue Island | Norfolk Island | Papua New Guinea | Samoa | Solomon Islands | Tonga | Tuvalu | Vanuatu

=== Host nation ===
Australia

== Broadcast ==
The opening ceremony was broadcast in Australia on the Nine Network. It was one of the highest rating programs of 2006 with 3,561,000 viewers across the five metro areas.

The BBC showed coverage in the UK.

== See also ==
- Commonwealth Games: Melbourne 2006 Opening Ceremony- (CD)
