= List of awards and nominations received by Cats (musical) =

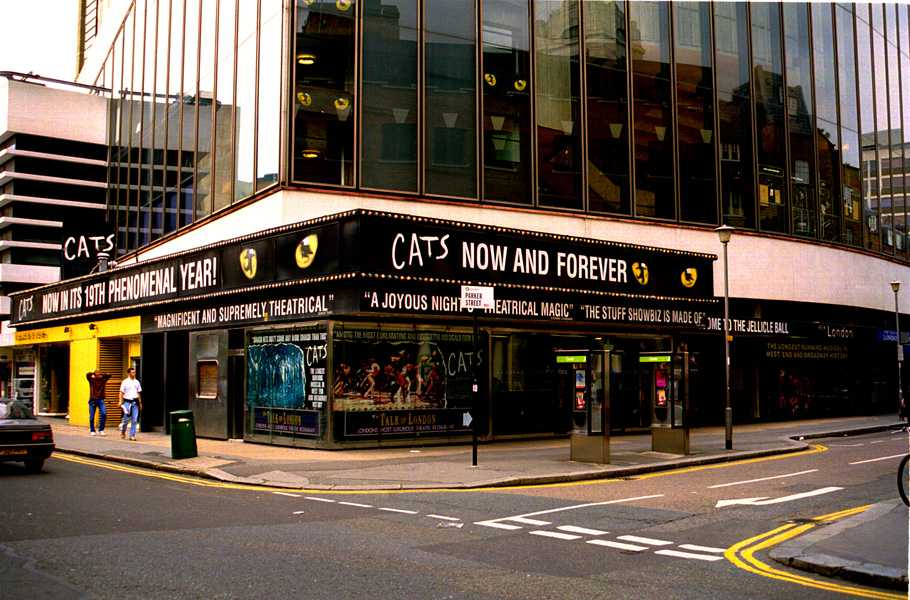
Cats at the New London Theatre.

Cats is a musical composed by Andrew Lloyd Webber, based on the 1939 poetry collection Old Possum's Book of Practical Cats by T. S. Eliot. It revolves around the Jellicle cat tribe during an important night, in which one cat is to be chosen to ascend to the Heaviside Layer and come back to a new life. The musical was produced by Cameron Mackintosh, directed by Trevor Nunn and choreographed by Gillian Lynne.

Cats premiered at the New London Theatre in the West End in 1981, and ran for 21 years and almost 9,000 performances. The musical garnered six Laurence Olivier Awards nominations, winning two awards: Best New Musical and Outstanding Achievement in a Musical (Gillian Lynne).

In 1982, Cats opened at the Winter Garden Theatre on Broadway where it played for 18 years and 7,485 performances. This production received eleven Tony Award nominations, out of which it won seven: Best Musical, Best Book of a Musical (T. S. Eliot), Best Original Score (Andrew Lloyd Webber and T. S. Eliot), Best Performance by a Featured Actress in a Musical (Betty Buckley), Best Direction of a Musical (Trevor Nunn), Best Costume Design (John Napier), and Best Lighting Design (David Hersey). At the 1983 Drama Desk Awards, the musical was nominated for five awards. It won three, including Outstanding Costume Design, Outstanding Lighting Design and Outstanding Music. The Washington, D.C. production received three Helen Hayes nominations in 1985, winning Outstanding Lead Actress in a Touring Production for Diane Fratantoni. The Toronto production was nominated for seven Dora Mavor Moore Award and won all of them. In Paris, the French production of Cats won one Molière Award.

The London and Broadway cast recordings were both nominated for the Grammy Award for Best Musical Theater Album, which the latter won. The 2014 London revival was nominated for two Laurence Olivier Awards, including Best Musical Revival but won none. The 2016 Broadway revival starring Leona Lewis received six Chita Rivera nominations, one Drama Desk nomination as well as one Drama League nomination.

== Original West End production ==
Year	Award	Category	Nominee	Result
1981	Evening Standard Theatre Awards	Best Musical		Won
1981	Laurence Olivier Award	Best New Musical		Won
1981	Laurence Olivier Award	Actor of the Year in a Musical	Brian Blessed	Nominated
1981	Laurence Olivier Award	Actor of the Year in a Musical	Wayne Sleep	Nominated
1981	Laurence Olivier Award	Director of the Year	Trevor Nunn	Nominated
1981	Laurence Olivier Award	Designer of the Year	John Napier	Nominated
1981	Laurence Olivier Award	Outstanding Achievement in a Musical	Gillian Lynne	Won
1982	Ivor Novello Awards	Best British Musical		Won
1982	Ivor Novello Awards	Best Song Musically and Lyrically	"Memory"	Won
1983	Grammy Award	Best Cast Show Album		Nominated

== Original Broadway production ==
Year	Award	Category	Nominee	Result
1983	Drama Desk Award	Outstanding Actress in a Musical	Betty Buckley	Nominated
1983	Drama Desk Award	Outstanding Costume Design	John Napier	Won
1983	Drama Desk Award	Outstanding Lighting Design	David Hersey	Won
1983	Drama Desk Award	Outstanding Lyrics	T. S. Eliot	Nominated
1983	Drama Desk Award	Outstanding Music	Andrew Lloyd Webber	Won
1983	Outer Critics Circle Award	Best Broadway Musical		Won
1983	Tony Award	Best Musical		Won
1983	Tony Award	Best Book of a Musical	T. S. Eliot	Won
1983	Tony Award	Best Original Score	Andrew Lloyd Webber and T. S. Eliot	Won
1983	Tony Award	Best Performance by a Featured Actor in a Musical	Harry Groener	Nominated
1983	Tony Award	Best Performance by a Featured Actor in a Musical	Stephen Hanan	Nominated
1983	Tony Award	Best Performance by a Featured Actress in a Musical	Betty Buckley	Won
1983	Tony Award	Best Direction of a Musical	Trevor Nunn	Won
1983	Tony Award	Best Choreography	Gillian Lynne	Nominated
1983	Tony Award	Best Scenic Design	John Napier	Nominated
1983	Tony Award	Best Costume Design	John Napier	Won
1983	Tony Award	Best Lighting Design	David Hersey	Won
1984	Grammy Award	Best Cast Show Album		Won

== North American productions ==
Year	Award	Category	Nominee	Result
1985	Helen Hayes Award	Outstanding Lead Actress in a Touring Production	Diane Fratantoni	Won
1985	Helen Hayes Award	Outstanding Supporting Performer in a Touring Production	Sal Mistretta	Nominated
1985	Helen Hayes Award	Outstanding Touring Production	National Theatre	Nominated
1985	Dora Mavor Moore Award	Outstanding Choreography	T. Michael Reed	Won
1985	Dora Mavor Moore Award	Outstanding Costume Design	John Napier	Won
1985	Dora Mavor Moore Award	Outstanding Direction	David Taylor	Won
1985	Dora Mavor Moore Award	Outstanding Lighting Design	David Hersey	Won
1985	Dora Mavor Moore Award	Outstanding Musical Direction	Stanley Lebowsky	Won
1985	Dora Mavor Moore Award	Outstanding Production	M.T.E. Productions	Won
1985	Dora Mavor Moore Award	Outstanding Set Design	John Napier	Won
1990	Carbonell Awards	Supporting Actor, Road Show	Joey Pizzi	Nominated
1993	Carbonell Awards	Supporting Actor, Road Show	Jimmy Lockett	Won
2003	Jeff Award	Outstanding Production of a Musical	Marriott Theatre	Nominated
2003	Jeff Award	Outstanding Choreography	Marc Robin	Won
2003	Jeff Award	Outstanding Ensemble		Nominated
2003	Jeff Award	Outstanding Costume Design	Nancy Missimi	Won
2003	Jeff Award	Outstanding Lighting Design	Diane Ferry Williams	Nominated
2003	Jeff Award	Outstanding Music Direction	Shawn Stengel	Nominated
2003	Jeff Award	Outstanding Direction of a Musical	Marc Robin	Nominated
2005	Helen Hayes Award	Outstanding Choreography, Resident Production	Toby's Dinner Theatre	Nominated
2014	Jeff Award	Outstanding Lighting Design – Large	Jesse Klug	Nominated
2014	Jeff Award	Outstanding Choreography	Marc Robin	Nominated
2014	Dora Mavor Moore Award	Outstanding Performance – Ensemble		Nominated
2014	Dora Mavor Moore Award	Outstanding Performance – Female	Ma-Anne Dionisio	Nominated

== Australian productions ==
Year	Award	Category	Nominee	Result
2010	Helpmann Awards	Best Female Actor in a Musical	Delia Hannah	Nominated
2010	Green Room Awards	Female Actor in a Leading Role	Delia Hannah	Nominated
2010	Green Room Awards	Male Actor in a Featured Role	Michael-John Hurney	Nominated
2010	Green Room Awards	Female Actor in a Featured Role	Lisa Marie Parker	Nominated
2010	Green Room Awards	Ensemble Performance		Nominated

== Paris productions ==
Year	Award	Category	Nominee	Result
1989	Molière Award	Best Musical		Won
2016	Molière Award	Best Musical		Nominated

== South African productions ==
Year	Award	Category	Nominee	Result
2001	Fleur du Cap Theatre Awards	Best Performance in a Musical or Revue	Warren Kimmel	Won
2001	Fleur du Cap Theatre Awards	Best Technical Contribution to Theatre for Technical Management	Keith Anderson	Won

== 2014 West End revival ==
Year	Award	Category	Nominee	Result
2015	Laurence Olivier Award	Best Musical Revival		Nominated
2015	Laurence Olivier Award	Best Actress in a Supporting Role in a Musical	Nicole Scherzinger	Nominated

== 2016 Broadway revival ==
Year	Award	Category	Nominee	Result
2017	Drama Desk Award	Outstanding Sound Design of a Musical	Mick Potter	Nominated
2017	Drama League Award	Outstanding Revival of a Broadway or Off-Broadway Musical		Nominated
2017	Chita Rivera Awards	Outstanding Ensemble in a Broadway Show		Nominated
2017	Chita Rivera Awards	Outstanding Male Dancer in a Broadway Show	Tyler Hanes	Nominated
2017	Chita Rivera Awards	Outstanding Male Dancer in a Broadway Show	Ricky Ubeda	Nominated
2017	Chita Rivera Awards	Outstanding Female Dancer in a Broadway Show	Eloise Kropp	Nominated
2017	Chita Rivera Awards	Outstanding Female Dancer in a Broadway Show	Georgina Pazcoguin	Nominated
2017	Chita Rivera Awards	Outstanding Female Dancer in a Broadway Show	Christine Cornish Smith	Nominated

== 2024 off-Broadway revival ==
Year	Award	Category	Nominee	Result
2025	Chita Rivera Awards	Special Recognition		Won
2025	Drama Desk Awards	Outstanding Revival of a Musical		Nominated
2025	Drama Desk Awards	Outstanding Featured Performance in a Musical	André De Shields	Nominated
2025	Drama Desk Awards	Outstanding Director of a Musical	Zhailon Levingston and Bill Rauch	Nominated
2025	Drama Desk Awards	Outstanding Choreography	Arturo Lyons and Omari Wiles	Won
2025	Drama Desk Awards	Outstanding Costume Design of a Musical	Qween Jean	Won
2025	Drama Desk Awards	Outstanding Lighting Design for a Musical	Adam Honoré	Nominated
2025	Drama Desk Awards	Outstanding Wig and Hair	Nikiya Mathis	Won
2025	Drama League Award	Outstanding Revival of a Musical		Nominated
2025	Drama League Award	Outstanding Direction of a Musical	Zhailon Levingston and Bill Rauch	Nominated
2025	Drama League Award	Distinguished Performance	André De Shields	Nominated
2025	New York Drama Critics' Circle Awards	Special Citation		Won
2025	Outer Critics Circle Awards	Outstanding Revival of a Musical		Won
2025	Outer Critics Circle Awards	Outstanding Featured Performer in an Off-Broadway Musical	André De Shields	Won
2025	Outer Critics Circle Awards	Outstanding Direction of a Musical	Zhailon Levingston and Bill Rauch	Nominated
2025	Outer Critics Circle Awards	Outstanding Costume Design	Qween Jean	Nominated
2025	Dorian Award	Outstanding Off-Broadway Production		Won
2025	Dorian Award	Outstanding LGBTQ Off-Broadway Production		Won
2025	Dorian Award	LGBTQ Theater Trailblazer	André De Shields	Won
2025	Dorian Award	Outstanding Featured Performance in an Off-Broadway Production	André De Shields	Won
2025	Dorian Award	Outstanding Featured Performance in an Off-Broadway Production	Sydney James Harcourt	Nominated
2025	Dorian Award	Outstanding Featured Performance in an Off-Broadway Production	“Tempress” Chastity Moore	Nominated

== 2026 Broadway revival ==
Year	Award	Category	Work	Result	Ref.
2026	Drama League Awards	Outstanding Revival of a Musical		Nominated	
2026	Drama League Awards	Outstanding Direction of a Musical	Zhailon Levingston and Bill Rauch	Nominated	
2026	Drama League Awards	Distinguished Performance	André De Shields	Nominated	
2026	New York Drama Critics Circle	Special Citation	Qween Jean	Won	
2026	Tony Awards	Best Revival of a Musical		Nominated	
2026	Tony Awards	Best Featured Actor in a Musical	André de Shields	Nominated	
2026	Tony Awards	Best Scenic Design in a Musical	Rachel Hauck	Nominated	
2026	Tony Awards	Best Costume Design of a Musical	Qween Jean	Won	
2026	Tony Awards	Best Lighting Design of a Musical	Adam Honoré	Nominated	
2026	Tony Awards	Best Sound Design of a Musical	Kai Harada	Nominated	
2026	Tony Awards	Best Direction of a Musical	Zhailon Levingston and Bill Rauch	Won	
2026	Tony Awards	Best Choreography	Omari Wiles and Arturo Lyons	Won	
2026	Tony Awards	Best Orchestrations	Andrew Lloyd Webber, David Wilson, Trevor Holder, and Doug Schadt	Nominated	
2026	Dorian Award	Outstanding Featured Performance in a Broadway Musical	Leiomy	Nominated	
2026	Dorian Award	LGBTQ Theater Trailblazer	Junior LaBeja	Won	
2026	Dorian Award	Outstanding Design of a Broadway Production		Nominated	
2026	Dorian Award	Broadway Showstopper Award	" Memory", "Tempress" Chasity Moore	Nominated	
2026	Dorian Award	Broadway Showstopper Award	"Skimbleshanks the Railway Cat", Emma Sofia	Won	
2026	Dorian Award	Broadway Showstopper Award	"Songs of the Jellicles and the Jellicle Ball", Company	Nominated	

== Cats: The Jellicle Ball ==
Year	Award	Category	Work	Result	Ref.
2026	Queerties Awards	Next Big Thing		Nominated	
