= Green Room Award for Female Actor in a Featured Role (Music Theatre) =

The Green Room Award for Female Actor in a Featured Role (Music Theatre) is an annual award recognising excellence in the performing arts in Melbourne. The peer-based Green Room Awards were first presented in February 1984 for productions held in 1983.

== Winners and nominees ==
Winners are in bold; nominees are provided when all nominees in that year are known.

=== 1980s ===
Year	Actor	Production	Character
**1983**; 1st
**1983**; 1st	**Donna Lee**	**Oklahoma!**	**Ado Annie**
**1984**; 2nd
**1984**; 2nd	**June Bronhill**	**The Pirates of Penzance**	**Ruth**
**1985**; 3rd
**1985**; 3rd	**Margo Lee**	**Stepping Out**	
**1986**; 4th
**1986**; 4th	**Marjorie Irving**	**Countess Maritza**	
**1987**; 5th
**1987**; 5th	**Caroline Gillmer**	**Nine**	**Saraghina**
**1988**; 6th
**1988**; 6th	**Madge Ryan**	**My Fair Lady**	**Mrs Higgins**
**1989**; 7th
**1989**; 7th	**Jacqui Rae**	**Anything Goes**	**Erma**
**1989**; 7th	Venetta Fields	Big River	Alice
**1989**; 7th	Maggie Kirkpatrick	Anything Goes	Mrs. Evangeline Harcourt
**1989**; 7th	Karen Knowles	Big River	Mary Jane Wilks
**1989**; 7th	Marian Mackenzie	Pastrana	Johanna Lent

=== 1990s ===
Year	Actor	Production	Character
**1990**; 8th
**1990**; 8th	**Robyn Arthur**	**Les Misérables**	**Madame Thenardier**
**1991**; 9th
**1991**; 9th	**Pamela Rabe**	**The Wizard of Oz**	**Wicked Witch of the West**
**1991**; 9th	Carrie Barr	Hair	Mary
**1991**; 9th	Meredith Chipperton	Hair	Astrid
**1991**; 9th	Tara Morice	The Venetian Twins	Colombina
**1992**; 10th
**1992**; 10th	**Louie Reyes**	**The King and I**	**Lady Thiang**
**1992**; 10th	Carrie Barr	King of Country	Vicki
**1992**; 10th	Tomi Kalinski	Ginger	Mick Ginger
**1992**; 10th	Julie Mullins	Return to the Forbidden Planet	Miranda
**1992**; 10th	Shu-Cheen Yu	The King and I	Tuptim
**1993**; 11th
**1993**; 11th	**Helen Buday**	**High Society**	**Liz Imbrie**
**1994**; 12th
**1994**; 12th	**Caroline O'Connor**	**West Side Story**	**Anita**
**1994**; 12th	Beth Daly	Falsettos	Dr Charlotte
**1994**; 12th	Christine Ewing	Me and My Girl	Lady Jacqueline Carstone
**1994**; 12th	Sharon Millerchip	Falsettos	Cordelia
**1994**; 12th	The Fabulous Singlettes – Anna Butera, Suzie French, Melissa Langton	The Pirates of Penzance	Major-General Stanley's Daughters
**1995**; 13th
**1996**; 14th
**1996**; 14th	No award given	—N/a	—N/a
**1997**; 15th
**1997**; 15th	**Christen O’Leary**	**A Little Night Music**	**Petra**
**1997**; 15th	Andrea McEwan	A Little Night Music	Fredrika Armfeldt
**1997**; 15th	Pamela Rabe	A Little Night Music	Countess Charlotte
**1997**; 15th	Delia Hannah	Chess	Svetlana
**1997**; 15th	Anne Wood	Crazy for You	Irene
**1998**; 16th
**1998**; 16th	**Caroline Gillmer**	**Chicago**	**Matron "Mama" Morton**
**1998**; 16th	Rachael Beck	Les Misérables	Fantine
**1998**; 16th	Donna Lee	Les Misérables	Madame Thenardier
**1998**; 16th	Geraldene Morrow	Into the Woods	Jack's Mother
**1998**; 16th	Helen Noonan	The Phantom of the Opera	Carlotta
**1999**; 17th
**1999**; 17th	**Chrissy Amphlett**	**The Boy From Oz**	**Judy Garland**
**1999**; 17th	Genevieve Davis	Rent	Joanne
**1999**; 17th	Estelle Mays-Cotton	Show Boat	Julie
**1999**; 17th	Jill Perryman	The Boy From Oz	Marion Woolnough
**1999**; 17th	Jacqui Rae	Show Boat	Ellie

=== 2000s ===
Year	Actor	Production	Character
**2000**; 18th
**2000**; 18th	**Christen O’Leary**	**Company**	**Amy**
**2000**; 18th	Pia Morley	The Sound of Music	Liesl
**2000**; 18th	Caroline Gillmer	Company	Joanne
**2000**; 18th	Nicki Wendt	Company	Sarah
**2000**; 18th	Amanda Levy	Prodigal Son	Maddy Sinclair
**2000**; 18th	Anne Wood	The Sound of Music	Elsa Schraeder
**2001**; 19th
**2001**; 19th	**Julie McGregor**	**Always... Patsy Cline**	**Louise Seger**
**2001**; 19th	**Lara Mulcahy**	**Mamma Mia!**	**Rosie**
**2001**; 19th	Rhonda Burchmore	Mamma Mia!	Tanya
**2001**; 19th	Trisha Noble	Shout! The Legend of the Wild One	Thelma O'Keefe
**2001**; 19th	Leonie Page	Mack & Mabel	Lottie Ames
**2002**; 20th
**2002**; 20th	**Cherine Peck**	**Hair**	**Diane**
**2002**; 20th	Ana Maria Belo	Hair	Jeanie
**2002**; 20th	Pamela Rabe	The Wizard of Oz	Wicked Witch of the West
**2002**; 20th	Sally-Anne Upton	Oliver!	Widow Corney/Mrs Bumble
**2002**; 20th	Judith Roberts	A New Brain	Mimi Schwinn
**2003**; 21st
**2003**; 21st	**Nadine Garner**	**Cabaret**	**Fräulein Kost**
**2003**; 21st	Judi Connelli	Cabaret	Fräulein Schneider
**2003**; 21st	Annie Crummer	We Will Rock You	Killer Queen
**2004**; 22nd
**2004**; 22nd	**Carrie Barr**	**Carousel**	**Carrie Pipperidge**
**2004**; 22nd	Nicki Wendt	Annie Get Your Gun	Dolly Tate
**2004**; 22nd	Queenie van de Zandt	The Full Monty	Vicki Nichols
**2005**; 23rd
**2005**; 23rd	**Lisa Sontag**	**Grease**	**Frenchy**
**2005**; 23rd	Amanda Harrison	Oklahoma!	Ado Annie
**2005**; 23rd	Chelsea Plumley	Sunset Boulevard	Betty Schaefer
**2005**; 23rd	Lelda Kapsis	Dirty Dancing	Lisa Houseman
**2005**; 23rd	Nancye Hayes	Oklahoma!	Aunt Eller
**2006**; 24th
**2006**; 24th	**Colleen Hewett**	**The Boy From Oz**	**Marion Woolnough**
**2006**; 24th	Nicki Wendt	Thoroughly Modern Millie	Mrs Meers
**2006**; 24th	Natalie O’Donnell	The 25th Annual Putnam County Spelling Bee	Olive Ostrovsky
**2006**; 24th	Monique Chanel Pitsakis	Hello Again	The Young Wife
**2006**; 24th	Kelly Rode	Virgins	Veronica/Link/Namida
**2006**; 24th	Magda Szubanski	The 25th Annual Putnam County Spelling Bee	William Barfée
**2007**; 25th
**2007**; 25th	No award given	—N/a	—N/a
**2008**; 26th
**2008**; 26th	**Penny McNamee**	**Wicked**	**Nessarose**
**2008**; 26th	Judi Connelli	Follies	Carlotta
**2008**; 26th	Rosemarie Harris	Shane Warne: The Musical	Simone Warne
**2008**; 26th	Nancye Hayes	My Fair Lady	Mrs Higgins
**2008**; 26th	Sharon Millerchip	The Rocky Horror Show	Columbia
**2009**; 27th
**2009**; 27th	No award given (Note: This year had a combined female and male "actor in a featured role" category. As a male actor won the award, no award was given for a female actor. The female nominees are listed.)	—N/a	—N/a
**2009**; 27th	Lisa Adam	Jersey Boys	Mary Delgado, Angel and others
**2009**; 27th	Sally Bourne	Once We Lived Here	Claire
**2009**; 27th	Nancye Hayes	A Little Night Music	Madame Armfeldt
**2009**; 27th	Christie Whelan	Once We Lived Here	Lucy

=== 2010s ===
Year	Actor	Production	Character
**2010**; 28th
**2010**; 28th	**Esther Hannaford**	**Hairspray**	**Penny Pingleton**
**2010**; 28th	Christen O’Leary	The Boy From Oz	Judy Garland
**2010**; 28th	Robyn Arthur	The Boy From Oz	Marion Woolnough
**2010**; 28th	Alinta Chidzey	West Side Story	Anita
**2010**; 28th	Lisa Marie Parker	Cats	Jellylorum/Griddlebone
**2011**; 29th
**2011**; 29th	**Emma Jones**	**The Hatpin**	**Clara Makin**
**2011**; 29th	Francine Cain	Rock of Ages	Regina
**2011**; 29th	Sharon Millerchip	Love Never Dies	Meg Giry
**2011**; 29th	Cherine Peck	Xanadu	Melpomene/Medusa
**2011**; 29th	Chelsea Plumley	Kismet	Lalume
**2012**; 30th
**2012**; 30th	**Alinta Chidzey**	**Chess**	**Svetlana**
**2012**; 30th	Julie Lea Goodwin	Annie	Grace
**2012**; 30th	Chelsea Plumley	Promises, Promises	Marge MacDougall
**2012**; 30th	Christie Whelan-Browne	A Funny Thing Happened on the Way to the Forum	Philia
**2013**; 31st
**2013**; 31st	**Christina Tan**	**Gypsy**	**Louise**
**2013**; 31st	Helen Dallimore	Legally Blonde	Paulette Bonafonte
**2013**; 31st	Nancye Hayes	Sunday in the Park with George	Old Lady/Blair Daniels
**2013**; 31st	Jennifer Vuletic	Chitty Chitty Bang Bang	Baroness Bomburst
**2013**; 31st	Christie Whelan-Browne	Singin' in the Rain	Lina Lamont
**2014**; 32nd
**2014**; 32nd	**Yong Ying Woo**	**The King and I**	**Eliza / Ensemble**
**2014**; 32nd	Lucy Maunder	Into the Woods	Cinderella
**2014**; 32nd	Lisa-Marie Parker	Blood Brothers	Linda
**2014**; 32nd	Shu-Cheen Yu	The King and I	Lady Thiang
**2015**; 33rd
**2015**; 33rd	**Heather Mitchell**	**Strictly Ballroom**	**Shirley Hastings**
**2015**; 33rd	Amy Berrisford	Cats	Demeter
**2015**; 33rd	Debora Krizak	Sweet Charity	Nickie / Ursula
**2015**; 33rd	Anne Wood	City Of Angels	Alaura / Carla
**2015**; 33rd	Buyi Zama	The Lion King	Rafiki
**2016**; 34th
**2016**; 34th	**Naomi Price**	**Ladies in Black**	
**2016**; 34th	Robyn Arthur	Singin’ in the Rain	
**2016**; 34th	Madison Green	The Light in the Piazza	
**2016**; 34th	Elise McCann	Matilda the Musical	
**2016**; 34th	Christen O’Leary	Ladies in Black	
**2017**; 35th
**2017**; 35th	**Robyn Nevin**	**My Fair Lady**	**Mrs Higgins**
**2017**; 35th	Verity Hunt-Ballard	Hello, Dolly!	Irene Molloy
**2017**; 35th	Nancye Hayes	Brigadoon	
**2018**; 36th
**2018**; 36th	**Johanna Allen**	**A Little Night Music**	Countess Charlotte Malcolm
**2018**; 36th	Jackie Rees	A Little Night Music	Madam Armfeldt
**2018**; 36th	Lucy Maunder	Beautiful: The Carole King Musical	Cynthia Weil
**2018**; 36th	Elandrah Feo	Bring It On: The Musical	Danielle
**2018**; 36th	Jayde Westaby	Mamma Mia! The Musical	Tanya

== See also ==
- Green Room Award for Female Actor in a Leading Role (Music Theatre)
- Green Room Award for Male Actor in a Leading Role (Music Theatre)
- Green Room Award for Male Actor in a Featured Role (Music Theatre)
