= Green Room Award for Male Actor in a Featured Role (Music Theatre) =

Annual arts award in Australia

The Green Room Award for Male Actor in a Featured Role (Music Theatre) is an annual award recognising excellence in the performing arts in Melbourne, Australia. The peer-based Green Room Awards were first presented in February 1984, for productions in 1983.

== Winners and nominees ==
Winners are in bold; nominees are provided when all nominees in that year are known.

=== 1980s ===
Year	Actor	Production	Character
**1983**; 1st
**1983**; 1st	**David Ravenswood**	**The Sound of Music**	**Max Detweiler**
**1984**; 2nd
**1984**; 2nd	**John Bolton Wood**	**The Pirates of Penzance**	**Major-General Stanley**
**1985**; 3rd
**1985**; 3rd	**Ronne Arnold**	**La Cage Aux Folles**	**Jacob**
**1986**; 4th
**1986**; 4th	**Ricky May**	**Guys and Dolls**	**Nicely-Nicely Johnson**
**1987**; 5th
**1987**; 5th	**Jon Ewing**	**Sweeney Todd**	**Judge Turpin**
**1988**; 6th
**1988**; 6th	**Warren Mitchell**	**My Fair Lady**	**Alfred Doolittle**
**1989**; 7th
**1989**; 7th	**Peter Whitford**	**Anything Goes**	**Moonface Martin**
**1989**; 7th	John Bell	Big River	The Duke
**1989**; 7th	Paul De Masson	Pastrana	
**1989**; 7th	Drew Forsythe	Big River	The King
**1989**; 7th	Dennis Olsen	The Gondoliers	Don Alhambra
**1989**; 7th	Grant Smith	Man of La Mancha	The Padre

=== 1990s ===
Year	Actor	Production	Character
**1990**; 8th
**1990**; 8th	**Anthony Warlow**	**Les Misérables**	**Enjolras**
**1991**; 9th
**1991**; 9th	**John Bolton Wood**	**Iolanthe**	**Lord Mountararat**
**1991**; 9th	Jonathan Biggins	The Venetian Twins	Lelio
**1991**; 9th	Jon Ewing	The Phantom of the Opera	Monsieur Firmin
**1991**; 9th	Ernie Gray	The Marriage of Fabio	
**1991**; 9th	Dennis Olsen	The Venetian Twins	Pancrazio
**1991**; 9th	Doug Parkinson	Buddy – The Buddy Holly Story	The Big Bopper
**1992**; 10th
**1992**; 10th	**Reg Livermore**	**The Pirates of Penzance**	**Major-General Stanley**
**1992**; 10th	Conal Coad	The Pirates of Penzance	Sergeant of Police
**1992**; 10th	Tony Harvey	Return to the Forbidden Planet	Ariel
**1992**; 10th	George Washingmachine	Return to the Forbidden Planet	Cookie
**1992**; 10th	William Zappa	The King and I	The Kralahome
**1993**; 11th
**1993**; 11th	**Bob Hornery**	**High Society**	**Uncle Willie**
**1994**; 12th
**1994**; 12th	**Tony Sheldon**	**Falsettos**	**Mendel**
**1994**; 12th	Paul Blackwell	South Pacific	Luther Billis
**1994**; 12th	Philip Gould	South Pacific	Lt. Joseph Cable
**1994**; 12th	Tony Harvey	Me and My Girl	The Hon. Gerald Bolingbroke
**1994**; 12th	Glynn Nicholas	The Pirates of Penzance	Major General Stanley
**1995**; 13th
**1996**; 14th
**1996**; 14th	No award given	—N/a	—N/a
**1997**; 15th
**1997**; 15th	**Marty Fields**	**Crazy for You**	**Lank Hawkins**
**1997**; 15th	Jon English	H.M.S. Pinafore	Dick Deadeye
**1997**; 15th	Drew Forsythe	H.M.S. Pinafore	Sir Joseph Porter
**1997**; 15th	Tim Rogers	A Little Night Music	Henrik
**1997**; 15th	Greg Stone	A Little Night Music	Count Carl-Magnus Malcolm
**1998**; 16th
**1998**; 16th	**William Zappa**	**Les Misérables**	**Thenardier**
**1998**; 16th	John Bowles	The Phantom of the Opera	Raoul, Vicomte de Chagny
**1998**; 16th	Donny Ray Evans	Sisterella	
**1998**; 16th	Jolyon James	Into the Woods	Rapunzel's Prince
**1998**; 16th	Anthony Weigh	Chicago	Amos Hart
**1998**; 16th	Anthony Weigh	Into the Woods	Jack
**1999**; 17th
**1999**; 17th	**Grant Piro**	**The Merry Widow**	**Negus**
**1999**; 17th	Jonathan Biggins	A Funny Thing Happened on the Way to the Forum	Hysterium
**1999**; 17th	John Bowles	A Funny Thing Happened on the Way to the Forum	Hero
**1999**; 17th	Opell Ross	Rent	Angel
**1999**; 17th	Justin Smith	Rent	Mark Cohen

=== 2000s ===
Year	Actor	Production	Character
**2000**; 18th
**2000**; 18th	**Graham Pages**	**Prodigal Son**	**Kane Flannery/Zach Marshall**
**2000**; 18th	**Mitchell Butel**	**Piaf**	
**2001**; 19th
**2001**; 19th	**Philip Gould**	**Annie**	**Rooster**
**2001**; 19th	Aaron Blabey	Shout! The Legend of the Wild One	Lee Gordon
**2001**; 19th	Damion Scarcella	Shout! The Legend of the Wild One	
**2001**; 19th	Philip Gould	Anything Goes	Lord Evelyn Oakleigh
**2001**; 19th	D.J. Foster	The Sign of the Seahorse	
**2002**; 20th
**2002**; 20th	**Mitchell Butel**	**Hair**	**Woof**
**2002**; 20th	Benjamin Nicholas	Oliver!	Artful Dodger
**2002**; 20th	Juan Jackson	Hair	Ronnie
**2002**; 20th	George Kapiniaris	Oh! What A Night	Stretch
**2002**; 20th	Tony Sheldon	The Witches of Eastwick	Clyde Gabriel
**2003**; 21st
**2003**; 21st	No award given	—N/a	—N/a
**2004**; 22nd
**2004**; 22nd	**Grant Piro**	**The Producers**	**Carmen Ghia**
**2004**; 22nd	Tony Sheldon	The Producers	Roger DeBris
**2004**; 22nd	Milton Craig Nealy	The Full Monty	Noah "Horse" T. Simmons
**2004**; 22nd	Barry Crocker	Eureka	Paddy
**2005**; 23rd
**2005**; 23rd	**James Millar**	**Oklahoma!**	**Jud Fry**
**2005**; 23rd	Mitchell Butel	Oklahoma!	Ali Hakim
**2005**; 23rd	Roger Howell	Sunset Boulevard	Max
**2005**; 23rd	Chris Parker	Oklahoma!	Will Parker
**2005**; 23rd	Nathan Wright	Mamma Mia!	Pepper
**2006**; 24th
**2006**; 24th	**Murray Bartlett**	**The Boy From Oz**	**Greg Connell**
**2006**; 24th	Bert LaBonte	The 25th Annual Putnam County Spelling Bee	Mitch Mahoney
**2006**; 24th	Tim Wright	The 25th Annual Putnam County Spelling Bee	Leaf Coneybear
**2006**; 24th	Tyler Coppin	The 25th Annual Putnam County Spelling Bee	Douglas Panch
**2007**; 25th
**2007**; 25th	**Eddie Perfect**	**Keating!**	**John Hewson/Alexander Downer**
**2007**; 25th	Terry Serio	Keating!	Bob Hawke/John Howard
**2007**; 25th	Derek Metzger	Spamalot	Patsy
**2007**; 25th	Thern Reynolds	42nd Street	Billy Lawlor
**2007**; 25th	Mark Conaghan	Spamalot	Historian/Prince Herbert
**2008**; 26th
**2008**; 26th	**Liam Dodds, Thomas Doherty, Landen Hale-Brown and Joel Slater**	**Billy Elliot the Musical**	**Michael**
**2008**; 26th	Lyall Brooks	The Thing About Men	Man
**2008**; 26th	Alex Rathgeber	Mame	Patrick Dennis
**2008**; 26th	Mike Smith	Billy Elliot the Musical	Tony
**2008**; 26th	David Whitney	Damn Yankees	Joe Boyd
**2009**; 27th
**2009**; 27th	**Luke Joslin** (Note: This year had a combined male and female "actor in a featured role" category. Luke Joslin was the only male nominee, and also won the award.)	**Avenue Q**	**Nikki / Trekkie Monster**

=== 2010s ===
Year	Actor	Production	Character
**2010**; 28th
**2010**; 28th	**Philip Quast**	**Mary Poppins**	**Mr Banks**
**2010**; 28th	Rohan Browne	West Side Story	Riff
**2010**; 28th	Rohan Browne	The Drowsy Chaperone	George
**2010**; 28th	Adam Murphy	The Drowsy Chaperone	Aldolpho
**2010**; 28th	Michael-John Hurney	Cats	Gus
**2011**; 29th
**2011**; 29th	**Matt Hetherington**	**Next to Normal**	**Dan Goodman**
**2011**; 29th	Lincoln Hall	Rock of Ages	Franz
**2011**; 29th	Michael Falzon	Rock of Ages	Stacee Jaxx
**2011**; 29th	Gareth Keegan	Next to Normal	Gabe
**2011**; 29th	Wayne Scott Kermond	Anything Goes	Moonface Martin
**2012**; 30th
**2012**; 30th	**Hugh Sheridan**	**A Funny Thing Happened on the Way to the Forum**	**Hero**
**2012**; 30th	Rohan Browne	A Chorus Line	Greg
**2012**; 30th	Mitchell Butel	A Funny Thing Happened on the Way to the Forum	Hysterium
**2012**; 30th	Todd McKenney	Annie	Rooster
**2013**; 31st
**2013**; 31st	**Tyler Coppin**	**Chitty Chitty Bang Bang**	**The Child Catcher**
**2013**; 31st	Michael Griffiths	Jersey Boys	Bob Crewe
**2013**; 31st	Matt Holly	Assassins	John Hinckley, Jr
**2013**; 31st	Nick Simpson-Deeks	Assassins	Balladeer/Lee Harvey Oswald
**2014**; 32nd
**2014**; 32nd	**Adrian Li Donni**	**Pacific Overtures**	**Kayama**
**2014**; 32nd	Aljin Abella	La Cage aux Folles	Jacob
**2014**; 32nd	Cameron Macdonald	Parade	Britt Craig / Governor Jack Slaton
**2014**; 32nd	Nick Simpson-Deeks	Pacific Overtures	Manjiro
**2015**; 33rd
**2015**; 33rd	**Josh Piterman**	**Cats**	**Gus / Growltiger / Bustopher Jones**
**2015**; 33rd	Adam Fiorentino	City of Angels	Lieutenant Munoz
**2015**; 33rd	Drew Forsythe	Strictly Ballroom	Doug Hastings
**2015**; 33rd	Cameron Goodall	The Lion King	Zazu
**2015**; 33rd	Ross Hannaford	Sweeney Todd	Tobias Ragg
**2016**; 34th
**2016**; 34th	**Jack Chambers**	**Singin’ in the Rain**	**Cosmo Brown**
**2016**; 34th	Bobby Fox	Ladies in Black	
**2016**; 34th	Daniel Frederiksen	Matilda the Musical	Mr Wormwood
**2016**; 34th	Jonathan Hickey	The Light in the Piazza	
**2016**; 34th	David Roberts	Ghost the Musical	
**2017**; 35th
**2017**; 35th	**Reg Livermore**	**My Fair Lady**	**Alfred Doolittle**
**2017**; 35th	Glenn Hill	Hello, Dolly!	Cornelius Hackl
**2017**; 35th	Michael Cormick	Jesus Christ Superstar	Pilate
**2017**; 35th	Aljin Abella	Aladdin	Iago
**2017**; 35th	Luke Joslin	Brigadoon	Jeff
**2018**; 36th
**2018**; 36th	**Nick Simpson-Deeks**	**Falsettos**	**Mendel**
**2018**; 36th	Mat Verevis	Beautiful: The Carole King Musical	Barry Mann
**2018**; 36th	Tony Taylor	Calamity Jane	Henry
**2018**; 36th	Rob Johnson	Calamity Jane	Francis Fryer
**2018**; 36th	Phillip Lowe	Mamma Mia! The Musical	Harry Bright

== See also ==
- Green Room Award for Female Actor in a Leading Role (Music Theatre)
- Green Room Award for Male Actor in a Leading Role (Music Theatre)
- Green Room Award for Female Actor in a Featured Role (Music Theatre)
