= David Harris (Australian actor) =

Australian Broadway actor and singer (born 9 August 1975)

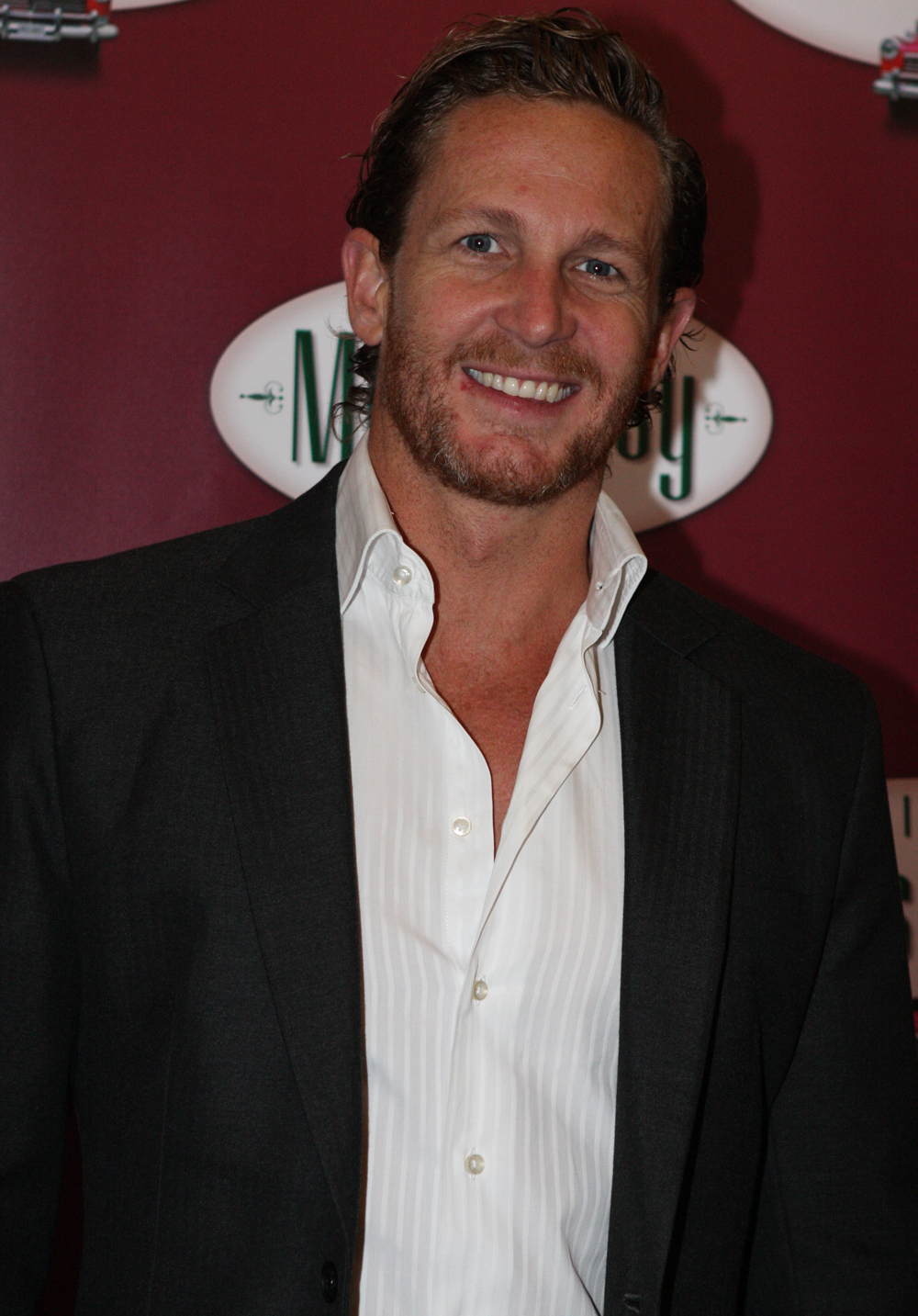
- Harris in 2013
- Born: 1975 (age 50–51); New South Wales, Australia
- Occupations: Actor, singer
- Years active: 1995–present
- Website: www.davidharrisofficial.com

David Harris (born 1975) is an Australian actor and singer. In Australia, he is best known for his performances as Chris in Miss Saigon, Fiyero in Wicked and Emmett in Legally Blonde having received Helpmann Award nominations for all three leading roles. Harris also starred as the Baker in Victorian Opera's production of Into the Woods and, in America, as Jean Valjean in Les Misérables opposite Terrence Mann in 2015. He has released two solo albums. Since early 2023, he has played the role of The Duke of Monroth in the Broadway theater production of Moulin Rouge! The Musical.

== Theatre ==
Harris made his professional theatre debut in 1998 as an original cast and workshop cast member of the world premiere production of The Boy from Oz directed by Gale Edwards with Todd McKenney as Peter Allen, where he also performed in the role of Greg as an understudy. This was quickly followed by another ensemble role in the Australian premiere production of Mamma Mia! with Anne Wood, where he also understudied as Sky.

He starred as Malcolm in The Full Monty with Paul Mercurio and Matt Hetherington, with other notable roles including the revolutionary student Perchik in the Fiddler on the Roof with Topol, and originating the role of Bud in the Australian premiere production of the comedy Gutenberg! The Musical! with James Millar in 2009.

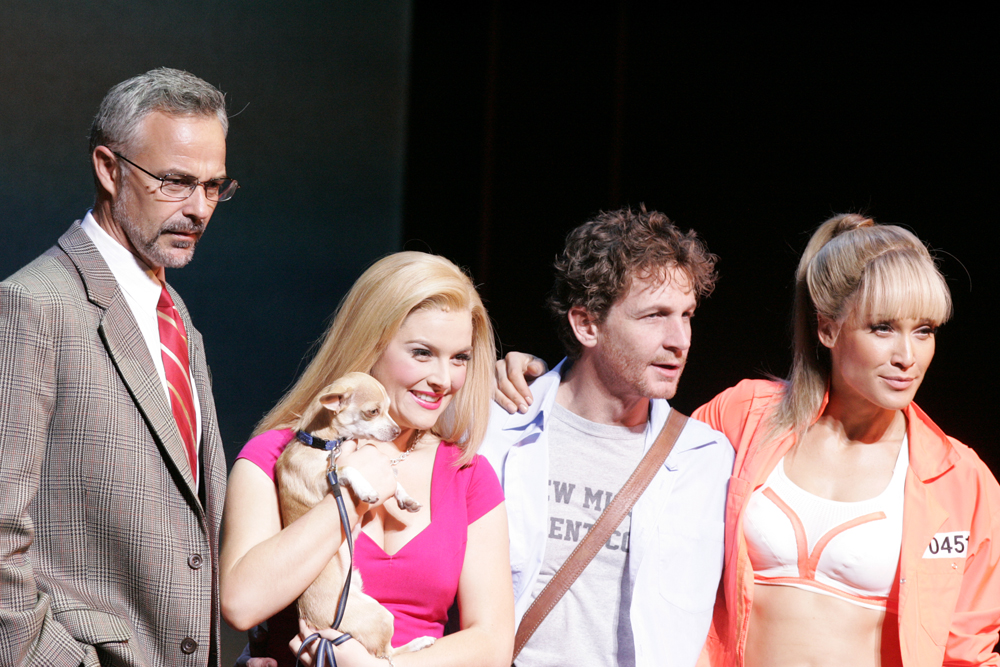
Harris (2nd from right) with Cameron Daddo, Lucy Durack, and Erika Heynatz in Legally Blonde: The Musical in 2012.

In 2007 he starred as Chris in Sir Cameron Mackintosh's Miss Saigon with Laurie Cadevida as Kim. Harris received his first nomination for Best Actor in a Musical at the Helpmann Awards as Chris, alongside other nominees including Hugh Jackman and the eventual winner iOTA. He also received a nomination in the Sydney Theatre Awards for this role.

In 2008 he starred as the "perfect, muscular, golden boy" Joe Hardy in Damn Yankees for The Production Company. He also starred as Greg in their season of The Boy from Oz, directed by Nancye Hayes AM, with Todd McKenney reprising his role as Peter Allen.

Between 2011 and 2013 Harris performed as Fiyero in Wicked "one of the most successful musicals ever staged in Australia" and was then reunited with his Wicked co-star Lucy Durack as Emmett in Legally Blonde, directed by Jerry Mitchell. Harris earned a second Helpmann Award nomination for Fiyero and a third nomination for Emmett. He was also awarded a Green Room Award for Emmett and his second nomination in the Sydney Theatre Awards.

In September 2013 Harris starred in the Australian professional premiere of a Stephen Schwartz's Children of Eden where he played the dual role of Noah and Adam. This was followed by the demanding role of The Baker in Stephen Sondheim's Into The Woods with the Victorian Opera and starring as The Beast in Disney's Beauty and the Beast in Melbourne.

After relocating to the United States, Harris starred as Jean Valjean with the Connecticut Repertory Theatre, in their production of Les Misérables opposite Terrence Mann in 2015. This production was also directed by Terrence Mann.

In 2025, he was featured in Stephen Sondheim's Old Friends at the Ahmanson Theatre and on Broadway.

== Concerts ==
- 2010 Adelaide Cabaret Festival – Stephen Schwartz and Friends
- 2010 Adelaide Cabaret Festival – Til the Night is Gone
- 2010 David Harris in concert – Civic Theatre Newcastle with special guest Elise McCann
- 2010 duet partner for Lea Salonga in Concert in Hanoi, Vietnam
- 2011 Harris performed in TDP Graduation Concert.
- Harris joined Michael Ball, Lea Salonga, Amanda Harrison, and Marie Zamora for Enda Markey Presents Do You Hear The People Sing at Shanghai Grand Theatre from 27 November until 1 December 2013 which coincided with the 15th anniversary of the Shanghai Grand Theatre and celebrated the work of Alain Boublil and Claude-Michel Schönberg.
- Salonga, Harris and Zamora reunited for a benefit concert on 29 and 30 January 2014 in Manila to aid the victims of Typhoon Haiyan (Yolanda) which devastated the region in November 2013.
- Harris joined Lucy Durack, this time for a concert "Wickedly Broadway" on 14 March 2014 Twilight at Taronga Zoo, Sydney.

Harris has also regularly performed at the Rob Guest Endowment, Light the Night and Hats Off Concerts.

== Film and television ==
Harris appears as Dreamy Solo in the 2001 made-for-television movie of South Pacific starring Glenn Close and Harry Connick Jr.

Harris's other television credits include Rescue: Special Ops, Blue Heelers and Neighbours.

In December 2012, Harris joined his Legally Blonde co-stars to perform at Carols in the Domain which is broadcast on the Channel 7 network.

== Discography ==
- 1998 The Boy From Oz (Original Australian Cast recording)
- 2009 'Til The Night Is Gone. Debut album
- 2010 LoveBites. Cast Recording.
- 2011 Breast Wishes. Australian Cast Recording
- 2011 At This Stage. Featuring duets with Lucy Durack, Jemma Rix and Kellie Rode

== Awards ==
Year	Award ceremony	Category	Role	Production	Result
1996	Mo Awards	The Johnny O'Keefe Encouragement Award		(Variety)	Won
2007	Helpmann Awards	Best Male Actor in a Musical	Chris	Miss Saigon	Nominated
2007	Sydney Theatre Awards	Best Performance by an Actor in a Musical	Chris	Miss Saigon	Nominated
2011	Helpmann Awards	Best Male Actor in a Musical	Fiyero	Wicked	Nominated
2012	Sydney Theatre Awards	Best Actor in a Leading Role in a Musical	Emmett Forrest	Legally Blonde	Nominated
2013	Helpmann Awards	Best Male Actor in a Musical	Emmett Forrest	Legally Blonde	Nominated
2013	Green Room Award	Male Actor in a Leading Role	Emmett Forrest	Legally Blonde	Won
