= Green Room Award for Female Actor in a Leading Role (Music Theatre) =

The Green Room Award for Female Actor in a Leading Role (Music Theatre) was an annual award recognising excellence in the performing arts in Melbourne, Australia. The peer-based Green Room Awards were first presented in February 1984, for productions in 1983. From 2019, music theatre performance awards were combined into a single cross-gender category for each of lead and supporting performances.

== Winners and nominees ==
Winners are in bold; nominees are provided when all nominees in that year are known.

=== 1980s ===
Year	Actor	Production	Character
**1983**; 1st
**1983**; 1st	**Judi Connelli**	**The Pack of Women**	
**1984**; 2nd
**1984**; 2nd	**Geraldine Turner**	**Oliver!**	**Nancy**
**1985**; 3rd
**1985**; 3rd	**Nancye Hayes**	**Stepping Out**	
**1986**; 4th
**1986**; 4th	**Nancye Hayes**	**Guys and Dolls**	**Miss Adelaide**
**1987**; 5th
**1987**; 5th	**Christine Douglas**	**Cho Cho San**	**Cho Cho San**
**1988**; 6th
**1988**; 6th	No award given	—N/a	—N/a
**1989**; 7th
**1989**; 7th	**Geraldine Turner**	**Anything Goes**	**Reno Sweeney**
**1989**; 7th	Geneviève Bujold	Joan of Arc at the Stake	Joan of Arc
**1989**; 7th	Jodie Gillies	Man of La Mancha	Aldonza/Dulcinea
**1989**; 7th	Caroline Gillmer	Only Heaven Knows	Guinea
**1989**; 7th	Suzanne Johnston	The Gondoliers	Tessa

=== 1990s ===
Year	Actor	Production	Character
**1990**; 8th
**1990**; 8th	**Marina Prior**	**Les Misérables**	**Cosette**
**1991**; 9th
**1991**; 9th	**Marina Prior**	**The Phantom of the Opera**	**Christine Daaé**
**1991**; 9th	Rhonda Burchmore	Iolanthe	Queen of the Fairies
**1991**; 9th	Anna Butera	Black Cargo	
**1991**; 9th	Cate McQuillen	Hair	Sheila
**1991**; 9th	Helen Noonan	The Venetian Twins	Beatrice
**1991**; 9th	Tamsin West	The Wizard of Oz	Dorothy
**1992**; 10th
**1992**; 10th	**Evelyn Krape**	**Ginger**	**Meg Ginger**
**1992**; 10th	Elizabeth Campbell	The Pirates of Penzance	Ruth
**1992**; 10th	Colleen Hewett	Return to the Forbidden Planet	Science Officer
**1992**; 10th	Sharon Prero	The Pirates of Penzance	Mabel
**1992**; 10th	Bernadette Robinson	You Might As Well Live	
**1993**; 11th
**1993**; 11th	**Josephine Byrnes**	**High Society**	**Tracey Lord**
**1994**; 12th
**1994**; 12th	**Gina Riley**	**Falsettos**	**Trina**
**1994**; 12th	Mary Sitarenos	The Last Supper	
**1995**; 13th (Note: This year had a combined 'best performance by a female artist' category, rather than separate categories for lead and featured.)
**1995**; 13th	**Jill Perryman**	**Hello, Dolly!**	**Dolly Levi**
**1995**; 13th	Robyn Arthur	Beauty and the Beast	Mrs Potts
**1995**; 13th	Heather Bolton	Assassins	Sara Jane Moore
**1995**; 13th	Kim Deacon	I Only Want To Be With You	
**1995**; 13th	Christen O'Leary	Assassins	Lynette "Squeaky" Fromme
**1996**; 14th
**1996**; 14th	No award given	—N/a	—N/a
**1997**; 15th
**1997**; 15th	**Kelley Abbey**	**Sweet Charity**	**Charity Hope Valentine**
**1997**; 15th	Fiona Benjamin	Crazy for You	Polly Baker
**1997**; 15th	Maria Mercedes	Sunset Boulevard	Norma Desmond
**1997**; 15th	Helen Morse	A Little Night Music	Desiree Armfeld
**1998**; 16th
**1998**; 16th	**Caroline O'Connor**	**Chicago**	**Velma Kelly**
**1998**; 16th	Chelsea Gibb	Chicago	Roxie Hart
**1998**; 16th	Amanda Levy	The Journey Girl	Annie
**1998**; 16th	Della Miles	Sisterella	Ella
**1998**; 16th	Jane Scali	Grease	Sandy
**1999**; 17th
**1999**; 17th	**Christine Anu**	**Rent**	**Mimi Márquez**
**1999**; 17th	Marina Prior	Show Boat	Magnolia

=== 2000s ===
Year	Actor	Production	Character
**2000**; 18th
**2000**; 18th	**Caroline O'Connor**	**Piaf**	**Édith Piaf**
**2000**; 18th	Kelley Abbey	Fame	Carmen Diaz
**2000**; 18th	Lisa McCune	The Sound of Music	Maria
**2001**; 19th
**2001**; 19th	**Anne Wood**	**Mamma Mia!**	**Donna**
**2001**; 19th	Rachael Beck	Singin' in the Rain	Kathy Seldon
**2001**; 19th	Maryanne McCormack	How to Succeed in Business Without Really Trying	Rosemary Pilkington
**2001**; 19th	Caroline O'Connor	Mack and Mabel	Mabel Normand
**2001**; 19th	Tamsin Carroll	Shout! The Legend of The Wild One	Marianne Renate
**2002**; 20th
**2002**; 20th	**Tamsin Carroll**	**Oliver!**	**Nancy**
**2002**; 20th	Robyn Arthur	Putting It Together	
**2002**; 20th	Meredith Chipperton	Hair	
**2003**; 21st
**2003**; 21st	**Lisa McCune**	**Cabaret**	**Sally Bowles**
**2003**; 21st	Sharon Millerchip	They're Playing Our Song	Sonia Walsk
**2003**; 21st	Kate Hoolihan	We Will Rock You	Scaramouche
**2004**; 22nd
**2004**; 22nd	**Chloe Dallimore**	**The Producers**	**Ulla**
**2004**; 22nd	Lisa McCune	Urinetown	Hope Cladwell
**2005**; 23rd
**2005**; 23rd	**Caroline Gillmer**	**Menopause the Musical**	**Power Woman**
**2005**; 23rd	**Marina Prior**	**Kiss Me, Kate**	**Lilli Vanessi**
**2005**; 23rd	Amanda Harrison	Leader of the Pack – The Ellie Greenwich Musical	Ellie Greenwich
**2006**; 24th
**2006**; 24th	**Tamsin Carroll**	**Dusty – The Original Pop Diva**	**Dusty Springfield**
**2006**; 24th	Marina Prior	The 25th Annual Putnam County Spelling Bee	Rona Lisa Peretti
**2006**; 24th	Amanda Levy	Virgins	Tracey/Lauren/Holly
**2006**; 24th	Julia Zemiro	Eurobeat: Almost Eurovision	Bronya
**2007**; 25th
**2007**; 25th	**Laurie Cadevida**	**Miss Saigon**	**Kim**
**2007**; 25th	Ana Marina	The Phantom of the Opera	Christine Daaé
**2007**; 25th	Sharon Millerchip	Sweet Charity	Charity Hope Valentine
**2007**; 25th	Donna Lee	Menopause the Musical	The Dubbo Housewife
**2007**; 25th	Lucinda Shaw	Spamalot	Lady of the Lake
**2008**; 26th
**2008**; 26th	**Genevieve Lemon**	**Billy Elliot the Musical**	**Mrs Wilkinson**
**2008**; 26th	Lisa Marie Charalambous	john & jen	Jen
**2008**; 26th	Lucy Durack	Wicked	Glinda
**2008**; 26th	Amanda Harrison	Wicked	Elphaba
**2008**; 26th	Lisa McCune	Guys and Dolls	Miss Sarah Brown
**2009**; 27th
**2009**; 27th	**Esther Hannaford**	**Once We Lived Here**	**Amy**
**2009**; 27th	Sharon Millerchip	Chicago	Roxie Hart
**2009**; 27th	Chelsea Plumley	Life's A Circus	Vivien

=== 2010s ===
Year	Actor	Production	Character
**2010**; 28th
**2010**; 28th	**Verity Hunt-Ballard**	**Mary Poppins**	**Mary Poppins**
**2010**; 28th	Jaz Flowers	Hairspray	Tracy Turnblad
**2010**; 28th	Christie Whelan	Sugar	Sugar Kane
**2010**; 28th	Delia Hannah	Cats	Grizabella
**2011**; 29th
**2011**; 29th	**Pamela Rabe**	**Grey Gardens**	**Edith Bouvier Beale/"Little" Edie Beale**
**2011**; 29th	Nancye Hayes	Turns	Marjorie Joy
**2011**; 29th	Amy Lehpamer	Rock of Ages	Sherrie
**2011**; 29th	Anna O'Byrne	Love Never Dies	Christine Daaé
**2012**; 30th
**2012**; 30th	**Silvie Paladino**	**Chess**	**Florence**
**2012**; 30th	Fem Belling	From Genesis to Broadway	
**2012**; 30th	Anita Louise Combe	A Chorus Line	Cassie
**2012**; 30th	Lisa McCune	South Pacific	Nellie Forbush
**2013**; 31st
**2013**; 31st	**Esther Hannaford**	**King Kong**	**Ann Darrow**
**2013**; 31st	Rachael Beck	Chitty Chitty Bang Bang	Truly Scrumptious
**2013**; 31st	Alinta Chidzey	Singin' in the Rain	Kathy Selden
**2013**; 31st	Claire Lyon	The Pirates of Penzance	Mabel
**2014**; 32nd
**2014**; 32nd	**Madeleine Jones**	**Once**	**Girl**
**2014**; 32nd	Alinta Chidzey	Show Boat	Magnolia
**2014**; 32nd	Lisa McCune	The King and I	Anna Leonowens
**2014**; 32nd	Chelsea Plumley	Guys and Dolls	Miss Adelaide
**2014**; 32nd	Queenie van de Zandt	Into the Woods	The Witch
**2015**; 33rd
**2015**; 33rd	**Verity Hunt-Ballard**	**Sweet Charity**	**Charity Hope Valentine**
**2015**; 33rd	Esther Hannaford	Nice Work If You Can Get It	Billie Bendix
**2015**; 33rd	Anna O'Byrne	West Side Story	Maria
**2015**; 33rd	Caroline O'Connor	Anything Goes	Reno Sweeney
**2015**; 33rd	Phoebe Panaretos	Strictly Ballroom	Fran
**2016**; 34th
**2016**; 34th	**Caroline O’Connor**	**Funny Girl**	**Fanny Brice**
**2016**; 34th	Dusty Bursill, Tiana Mirra, Alannah Parfett and Ingrid Torelli	Matilda the Musical	Matilda
**2016**; 34th	Jayme-Lee Hanekom	The Color Purple	
**2016**; 34th	Verity Hunt-Ballard	The Last Five Years	
**2016**; 34th	Sarah Morrison	Ladies in Black	
**2017**; 35th
**2017**; 35th	**Christie Whelan Browne**	**Vigil**	
**2017**; 35th	Anna O'Byrne	My Fair Lady	Eliza Doolittle
**2017**; 35th	Marina Prior	Hello, Dolly!	Dolly Levi
**2017**; 35th	Genevieve Kingsford	Brigadoon	
**2018**; 36th
**2018**; 36th	**Esther Hannaford**	**Beautiful: The Carole King Musical**	Carole King
**2018**; 36th	Virginia Gay	Calamity Jane	Calamity Jane
**2018**; 36th	Natalie O’Donnell	Mamma Mia! The Musical	Donna
**2018**; 36th	Tina Arena	Evita	Eva Perón

== See also ==
- Green Room Award for Male Actor in a Leading Role (Music Theatre)
- Green Room Award for Female Actor in a Featured Role (Music Theatre)
- Green Room Award for Male Actor in a Featured Role (Music Theatre)
