= Green Room Award for Male Actor in a Leading Role (Music Theatre) =

Australian performing arts award

The Green Room Award for Male Actor in a Leading Role (Music Theatre) is an annual award recognising excellence in the performing arts in Melbourne. The peer-based Green Room Awards were first presented in February 1984, for productions in 1983.

== Winners and nominees ==
Winners are in bold; nominees are provided when all nominees in that year are known.

=== 1980s ===
Year	Actor	Production	Character
**1983**; 1st
**1983**; 1st	**John Meehan**	**Song and Dance**	
**1984**; 2nd
**1984**; 2nd	**Jon English**	**The Pirates of Penzance**	**Pirate King**
**1985**; 3rd
**1985**; 3rd	**Jon Ewing**	**La Cage Aux Folles**	**Albin**
**1986**; 4th
**1986**; 4th	**Peter Adams**	**Guys and Dolls**	**Nathan Detroit**
**1987**; 5th
**1987**; 5th	**David Atkins**	**Dancin' Man**	
**1988**; 6th
**1988**; 6th	**Lewis Fiander**	**My Fair Lady**	**Henry Higgins**
**1989**; 7th
**1989**; 7th	**Simon Burke**	**Anything Goes**	**Billy Crocker**
**1989**; 7th	Geoffrey Chard	Man of La Mancha	Cervantes/Don Quixote
**1989**; 7th	Cameron Daddo	Big River	Huckleberry Finn
**1989**; 7th	Michael Edward-Stevens	Big River	Jim
**1989**; 7th	D.J. Foster	Pastrana	Charles Lent

=== 1990s ===
Year	Actor	Production	Character
**1990**; 8th
**1990**; 8th	**Rob Guest**	**Les Misérables**	**Jean Valjean**
**1991**; 9th
**1991**; 9th	**Anthony Warlow**	**The Phantom of the Opera**	**Phantom**
**1991**; 9th	Nick Carrafa	Hair	Claude
**1991**; 9th	Cameron Daddo	The Wizard of Oz	Scarecrow
**1991**; 9th	Drew Forsythe	The Venetian Twins	Zanetto/Tonino
**1991**; 9th	David Whitney	The Wizard of Oz	Tin Man
**1992**; 10th
**1992**; 10th	**John Waters**	**Looking Through a Glass Onion**	**John Lennon**
**1992**; 10th	Jeffrey Black	The Pirates of Penzance	Pirate King
**1992**; 10th	Marty Fields	Three Guys Naked from the Waist Down	
**1992**; 10th	Rhys Muldoon	Three Guys Naked from the Waist Down	
**1992**; 10th	D.J. Foster	Return to the Forbidden Planet	Dr Prospero
**1992**; 10th	John Wood	King of Country	Chook Fowler
**1993**; 11th
**1993**; 11th	**Keith Michell**	**Scrooge**	**Ebenezer Scrooge**
**1994**; 12th
**1994**; 12th	**Derek Metzger**	**Me and My Girl**	**Bill Snibson**
**1994**; 12th	Michael Cormick	Falsettos	Whizzer
**1994**; 12th	John O'May	Falsettos	Marvin
**1994**; 12th	Merfyn Owen	Rigoletto: A Perversion	
**1995**; 13th (Note: This year had a combined 'best performance by a male artist' category, rather than separate categories for lead and featured.)
**1995**; 13th	**Drew Forsythe**	**The Mikado**	**Ko-Ko**
**1995**; 13th	David Gould	The Mikado	The Mikado
**1995**; 13th	Bruce Myles	Assassins	
**1995**; 13th	John O'May	Assassins	John Wilkes Booth
**1995**; 13th	Grant Smith	Beauty and the Beast	Lumiere
**1996**; 14th
**1996**; 14th	No award given	—N/a	—N/a
**1997**; 15th
**1997**; 15th	**John O'May**	**A Little Night Music**	**Fredrik Egerman**
**1997**; 15th	Paul Blackwell	The Venetian Twins	Zanetto/Tonino
**1997**; 15th	Philip Gould	Crazy for You	Bobby Child
**1997**; 15th	Derek Metzger	Chess	Anatoly
**1997**; 15th	Jeremy Stanford	Sweet Charity	Oscar Lindquist
**1998**; 16th
**1998**; 16th	**Topol**	**Fiddler on the Roof**	**Tevye**
**1998**; 16th	Kanen Breen	Vincent an a cappella opera	
**1998**; 16th	Michael McCarthy	Les Misérables	Javert
**1998**; 16th	Timothy Shew	Les Misérables	Jean Valjean
**1999**; 17th
**1999**; 17th	**Todd McKenney**	**The Boy From Oz**	**Peter Allen**
**1999**; 17th	Philip Gould	Show Boat	Gaylord Ravenal
**1999**; 17th	Barry Otto	Show Boat	Cap'n Andy

=== 2000s ===
Year	Actor	Production	Character
**2000**; 18th
**2000**; 18th	**Craig Urbani**	**Buddy – The Buddy Holly Story**	**Buddy Holly**
**2000**; 18th	Peter Cousens	Company	Bobby
**2001**; 19th
**2001**; 19th	**David Campbell**	**Shout! The Legend of the Wild One**	**Johnny O'Keefe**
**2001**; 19th	Todd McKenney	Singin' in the Rain	Don Lockwood
**2001**; 19th	Anthony Warlow	Annie	Oliver "Daddy" Warbucks
**2001**; 19th	Wayne Scott Kermond	Singin' in the Rain	Cosmo Brown
**2001**; 19th	Derek Metzger	How to Succeed in Business Without Really Trying	J. Pierrepont Finch
**2002**; 20th
**2002**; 20th	**Martin Crewes**	**Hair**	**Claude**
**2002**; 20th	Paul McDermott	The Witches of Eastwick	Darryl Van Horne
**2002**; 20th	Damien Aylward	I Should Be So Lucky	Scott
**2002**; 20th	Matt Hetherington	Hair	Berger
**2002**; 20th	Martin Crewes	The Man from Snowy River	Jim Ryan (The Man)
**2003**; 21st
**2003**; 21st	**Ian Stenlake**	**They're Playing Our Song**	**Vernon Gersch**
**2003**; 21st	Toby Allen	Cabaret	Emcee
**2003**; 21st	Ian Stenlake	Cabaret	Clifford Bradshaw
**2003**; 21st	Martin Croft	Joe Starts Again	Joe
**2004**; 22nd
**2004**; 22nd	**David Campbell**	**Carousel**	**Billy Bigelow**
**2004**; 22nd	Ian Stenlake	Eureka	Peter Lalor
**2004**; 22nd	Matt Hetherington	The Full Monty	Jerry Lukowski
**2004**; 22nd	Jamie Jackson	Love: A Multiple Choice Question	
**2005**; 23rd
**2005**; 23rd	**Ian Stenlake**	**Oklahoma!**	**Curly**
**2005**; 23rd	Adam Jon Fiorentino	Saturday Night Fever	Tony
**2005**; 23rd	David Campbell	Sunset Boulevard	Joe Gillis
**2006**; 24th
**2006**; 24th	**iOTA**	**Hedwig and the Angry Inch**	**Hedwig**
**2006**; 24th	Hugh Jackman	The Boy From Oz	Peter Allen
**2007**; 25th
**2007**; 25th	**Tony Sheldon**	**Priscilla Queen of the Desert the musical**	**Bernadette**
**2007**; 25th	Mitchell Butel	Little Me	Noble Egglestone and all the men in Belle's life
**2007**; 25th	Leo Tavarro Valdez	Miss Saigon	The Engineer
**2007**; 25th	Mike McLeish	Keating!	Paul Keating
**2007**; 25th	Bille Brown	Spamalot	King Arthur
**2008**; 26th
**2008**; 26th	**Michael Dameski, Joshua Denyer, Rhys Kosakowski, Dayton Tavares, and Joshua Waiss Gates**	**Billy Elliot the Musical**	**Billy Elliot**
**2008**; 26th	Eddie Perfect	Shane Warne: The Musical	Shane Warne
**2008**; 26th	Richard Piper	Billy Elliot the Musical	Dad
**2009**; 27th
**2009**; 27th	**Matt Hetherington**	**Dirty Rotten Scoundrels**	**Freddy Benson**
**2009**; 27th	Mitchell Butel	Avenue Q	Princeton/Rod
**2009**; 27th	Bobby Fox	Jersey Boys	Frankie Valli
**2009**; 27th	Scott Johnson	Jersey Boys	Tommy De Vito
**2009**; 27th	James Millar	Gutenberg! The Musical!	Doug Simon

=== 2010s ===
Year	Actor	Production	Character
**2010**; 28th
**2010**; 28th	**Geoffrey Rush**	**The Drowsy Chaperone**	**Man In Chair**
**2010**; 28th	Todd McKenney	The Boy From Oz	Peter Allen
**2011**; 29th
**2011**; 29th	**Brent Hill**	**Rock of Ages**	**Lonny**
**2011**; 29th	Reg Livermore	Turns	Alistair
**2012**; 30th
**2012**; 30th	**Wayne Scott Kermond**	**The Producers**	**Max Bialystock**
**2012**; 30th	Martin Crewes	Chess	Freddy
**2012**; 30th	Simon Gleeson	Chess	Anatoly
**2012**; 30th	Matt Hetherington	Promises, Promises	Chuck Baxter
**2012**; 30th	Geoffrey Rush	A Funny Thing Happened on the Way to the Forum	Pseudolus
**2013**; 31st
**2013**; 31st	**David Harris**	**Legally Blonde**	**Emmett Forrest**
**2013**; 31st	Rohan Browne	Singin' in the Rain	Don Lockwood
**2013**; 31st	Bobby Fox	Hot Shoe Shuffle	Spring
**2014**; 32nd
**2014**; 32nd	**Tom Parsons**	**Once**	**Guy**
**2014**; 32nd	**Hayden Tee**	**Les Misérables**	**Javert**
**2014**; 32nd	Simon Burke	La Cage aux Folles	Georges
**2014**; 32nd	Simon Gleeson	Les Misérables	Jean Valjean
**2014**; 32nd	Gareth Keegan	Blood Brothers	Mickey Johnstone
**2015**; 33rd
**2015**; 33rd	**Martin Crewes**	**Sweet Charity**	**Charlie / Oscar / Vittorio**
**2015**; 33rd	Nick Afoa	The Lion King	Simba
**2015**; 33rd	Jordan Pollard	Avenue Q	Princeton / Rod
**2015**; 33rd	Alex Rathgeber	Anything Goes	Billy Crocker
**2015**; 33rd	Nick Simpson-Deeks	Company	Bobby
**2016**; 34th
**2016**; 34th	**Callum Francis**	**Kinky Boots**	
**2016**; 34th	Brent Hill	Little Shop of Horrors	
**2016**; 34th	Simon Gleeson	Curtains	
**2016**; 34th	James Millar	Matilda the Musical	
**2017**; 35th
**2017**; 35th	**Charles Edwards**	**My Fair Lady**	**Henry Higgins**
**2017**; 35th	Grant Piro	Hello, Dolly!	Horace Vandergelder
**2017**; 35th	Joel Granger	Ordinary Days	Warren
**2017**; 35th	Ainsley Melham	Aladdin	Aladdin
**2017**; 35th	Michael James Scott	Aladdin	Genie
**2018**; 36th
**2018**; 36th	**Brent Hill**	**School of Rock: The Musical**	Dewey
**2018**; 36th	Josh Piterman	Beautiful: The Carole King Musical	Gerry Goffin
**2018**; 36th	Euan Doidge	Priscilla: Queen Of The Desert	Felicia
**2018**; 36th	David Harris	Priscilla: Queen Of The Desert	Tick/Mitzi
**2018**; 36th	Kurt Kansley	Evita	Che

== See also ==
- Green Room Award for Female Actor in a Leading Role (Music Theatre)
- Green Room Award for Female Actor in a Featured Role (Music Theatre)
- Green Room Award for Male Actor in a Featured Role (Music Theatre)
