= James Millar (Australian actor) =

- Born: Sydney, Australia
- Genres: Musical theatre, cabaret
- Occupations: Actor, singer, writer, lyricist

James Millar is an Australian actor, singer and writer. He wrote the musical drama The Hatpin, the song cycle LOVEBiTES and co-wrote the semi-autobiographical musical A Little Touch of Chaos.

== Early life and education ==
Millar earned a degree in writing at the University of Technology Sydney and a degree in performance at the Western Australian Academy of Performing Arts (WAAPA) in 2004.

While studying in Perth, he was directed and tutored by a number of notable Australian performers such as David King, Tony Sheldon, Nick Enright, Roma Conway, Rhys McConnochie, Adam Cook, John Milson and Nancye Hayes. Prior to graduating, he starred in the original recording and premiere performance of Up by Eddie Perfect, Susannah, Spurboard, The Pajama Game, Pacific Overtures, Perfectly Frank, The Crucible, Fiddler on the Roof and The Wild Party.

== Career ==
While in Western Australia, Millar also appeared in Morning Melodies at His Majesty's Theatre in Perth, Assassins and Piangere.

In 2010, Millar and collaborator Peter Rutherford were commissioned to workshop and produce their third book musical A Little Touch of Chaos at WAAPA. In 2013, Millar was invited to direct WAAPA's production of Assassins, by the third year music theatre students, which opened in August 2013.

For television, Millar has played roles in Home and Away, Police Rescue, A Country Practice, The Leaving of Liverpool, The Investigators (ABC TV), Water Rats and Neil Armfield's tele-film Naked: Coral Island.

He was featured in the 2008 award-winning film The Eternity Man, directed by Julien Temple.

=== Cabaret ===
Millar has penned a number of original cabaret shows, including Moments of Breathtaking Stupidity which he performed with Verity Hunt-Ballard in both Sydney and Melbourne in 2004; The Story Goes On for Amanda Harrison; Poison Soprano; Ten Things I Hate About Cabaret; Impossible Blonde; and Amelia Cormack's Love For Sale, which enjoyed four return seasons.

He was also the winner of the 2004 Premiere Cabaret Showcase in Sydney which resulted in the performance of his second cabaret show, Other People's Stories, followed by a tour with celebrated Australian actor Amanda Muggleton in the cabaret Naughty.

Millar performed in a vocal trio with fellow actors Ian Stenlake and Scott Irwin, called Bravo.

In cabaret circles, he is known for his appearance in ShowQueen Sessions which toured Sydney and Melbourne.

In March 2010, Millar featured in Another Opening Another Show at Chapel off Chapel in Melbourne and ShowStoppers produced by Lisa and David Campbell's company Luckiest Productions.

He joined Doctor Zhivago star Lucy Maunder in a production of Noel and Gertie, based on the diaries and letters of Noël Coward and Gertrude Lawrence. It was featured at the Adelaide Cabaret Festival in May 2013.

In 2013 Millar wrote the cabaret Up Close and Reasonably Personal for Amanda Harrison. which continues to tour.

=== Musical theatre ===
Millar appeared in Oklahoma! for The Production Company at the State Theatre in Melbourne, and The Adventures of Snugglepot and Cuddlepie for Company B Belvoir directed by Neil Armfield. He starred in both seasons of the comedy BoyBand in Sydney, played the principal role of Frederic Vern in the world premiere production of Eureka at Melbourne's Her Majesty's Theatre for the Melbourne International Arts Festival, recorded and toured with ShowQueen: Live in both Sydney and Melbourne, starred in the critically acclaimed song cycle LoveBites, and played the role of Peter in Sondheim's Company at Sydney's Theatre Royal.

Millar was cast in the defunct production of Floyd Collins for the Kookaburra Theatre Company; however he, like the rest of the cast, made himself available for a one-off concert performance on 3 May 2010. This production also starred Peter Cousens, Michael Falzon, Trisha Crowe and Queenie van de Zandt.

In 2009, he performed in the Australian premiere of the off-Broadway musical Gutenberg! The Musical!; starred as Chucky in Jerry Springer: The Opera at the Sydney Opera House; and appeared at Sydney's Ensemble Theatre in the lead role of Mitchell Green in the premiere of The Little Dog Laughed by Douglas Carter Beane.

In 2013, he featured in the Australian premiere of Grey Gardens for The Production Company, The Ring Cycle at the Royal Opera House in London, and toured the UK in Chess as Molokov.

In April 2014, Millar was announced for the ensemble cast of the US arena tour of Jesus Christ Superstar, starring Ben Forster and John Lydon. However, the tour was subsequently cancelled.

In April 2015, it was announced that Millar would play Miss Trunchbull in the Australian premiere season of Matilda the Musical opening in Sydney in July.

He followed this successful run with a star turn as Alan Bennett opposite Miriam Margolyes in the Melbourne Theatre Company's The Lady in the Van.

In 2023, Millar was invited to direct Sweeney Todd: The Demon Barber of Fleet Street at the Elder Conservatorium in Adelaide, South Australia.

=== BBC Radio Voice of Musical Theatre ===
In 2006 he was invited to Cardiff for BBC Radio 2's Voice of Musical Theatre, one of only a select few international artists featured to perform each year.

=== The Hatpin ===
In 2006 and 2007, Millar wrote and developed the musical The Hatpin alongside composer Peter Rutherford, based on a series of infanticides committed in Sydney by John and Sarah Makin (renamed Agatha and Charles for the show) in 1892, as well as the attempts by single mother Amber Murray to find justice for her son Horace.

The Hatpin opened at the Seymour Centre in Sydney on 27 February 2008 to mild acclaim. The production starred Peter Cousens, Caroline O'Connor, Michelle Doake, Gemma-Ashley Kaplan, Barry Crocker, and Melle Stewart. A cast album was released in 2008 by Neil Gooding Productions

In 2008, The Hatpin was accepted into the New York Musical Theatre Festival, where it played in reduced-format with a US cast at The American Theatre of Actors.

=== LOVEBiTES ===
Following the success of The Hatpin, Millar teamed up again with Rutherford for the song cycle LOVEBiTES in 2008. Millar appeared as a performer in the production along with Octavia Barron Martin, Tyler Burness, and Sarah Croser. The production received a revival in 2009.

LOVEBiTES returned in 2009, when it earned two Glugs Award nominations and a season at Perth's Playhouse in 2010. The Perth cast again included Millar, with Amelia Cormack, David Harris and Sophia Ragavelas. An official cast recording was done with the 2009 cast and released in February 2010

=== Audiobooks ===
In London, Millar recorded several audiobooks as a narrator, including 1912: The History of Antarctica, Stranger Than Fiction for Lonely Planet, and The Rosie Project, as well as multiple audiobook works for the Royal National Institute of Blind People.

== Awards ==
- In 2005, Millar won the inaugural Cabaret Showcase in Sydney.
- In 2006, Millar won the Green Room Award for Best Supporting Actor in 2006 for his performance of Jud Fry in Oklahoma! in Melbourne.
- In 2008, Millar won best actor in the Sydney "Short and Sweet" Festival for his performance in the short play Blenderman.
- In 2009, LoveBites was nominated for best cabaret at the Sydney Theatre Awards and The Hatpin was nominated for best new Australian work.
- In 2010, Millar was nominated for a Sydney Theatre Award, a Glugs Award and a Green Room Award for his performance of "Doug Simon" in Gutenberg! The Musical!.
- In 2014, A Little Touch of Chaos won the Arts Victoria Grant for best New Australian Work.
- In 2016, Millar won the Helpmann Award for Best Male Actor in a Musical for his performance as Miss Trunchbull in Matilda the Musical.
