= The Venetian Twins (musical) =

- Poster for 1981 production by Martin Sharp
- Music: Terence Clarke
- Lyrics: Nick Enright
- Book: Nick Enright
- Basis: I due gemelli veneziani by Carlo Goldoni
- Productions: Sydney 1979; Sydney 1981; Brisbane 1990; Newcastle 1996; Adelaide 1996; Brisbane 2004

The Venetian Twins is an Australian two-act musical comedy. It was adapted from a commedia dell'arte play - I due gemelli veneziani by Carlo Goldoni - and the lyrics were written by Nick Enright; the music was composed and arranged by Terence Clarke.

== Production history ==
The Venetian Twins premiered on 26 October 1979 in the Drama Theatre of the Sydney Opera House. The Nimrod Theatre Company production was directed by John Bell and designed by Stephen Curtis for the inaugural season of the Sydney Theatre Company. It starred Drew Forsythe as the twins, coloratura soprano Jennifer McGregor (for both of whom their rôles were specifically written). Tony Sheldon, Tony Taylor, Jon Ewing (as Pancrazio, the villain), and others.

The 1981 Sydney remount by Nimrod Theatre at the York Theatre, Seymour Centre featuring most of the original cast - although reduced from ten to nine - toured to Canberra, Adelaide, Melbourne and Geelong.

The 1990 Brisbane production by the Royal Queensland Theatre Company - directed by Bell, designed by Curtis, and starring Forsythe, all for the third time - also played seasons in Sydney and Melbourne.

Other notable productions include those of the State Theatre Company of South Australia featuring Paul Blackwell (Adelaide 1996 and Melbourne), Queensland Theatre Company featuring Mitchell Butel (Brisbane 2004)., and Sydney's New Theatre in 2012, featuring Jay James Moody. It is frequently produced by schools and amateur theatre groups.

== Reception and awards ==
The 1991 Melbourne season was nominated for nine Melbourne Green Room Awards for music theatre: Production, Direction (John Bell), Set Design (Stephen Curtis), Costume Design (Stephen Curtis), Male Performer in a Leading Role (Drew Forsythe), Female Performer in a Leading Role (Helen Noonan), Male Performer in a Supporting Role (both Jonathon Biggins and Dennis Olsen) and Female Performer in a Supporting Role (Tara Morice).

For the 1997 Melbourne season, Paul Blackwell was nominated for a Green Room Award for Male Artist in a Leading Role in music theatre.

For the 2004 Brisbane production, Mitchell Butel received the 2005 Helpmann Award for Best Male Actor in a Musical. Also nominated were Bridget Boyle (Best Female Actor in a Musical), Sandro Colarelli (Best Male Actor in a Supporting Role in a Musical) and Robert Kemp (both Best Scenic Design and Best Costume Design).

== Publications ==
The script was published by Currency Press, Sydney, in 1996, and the vocal score by Fitzroy Press some time later. The work has been a set text for the NSW Higher School Certificate English and Drama courses, and VIC Victorian Certificate of Education Theatre Studies Course. Larrikin Records released a cast recording of the 1981 production. The five-player instrumentation is: flute doubling guitar; clarinet; trombone; percussion, including tubular bells; and piano.

The manuscript of the libretto and lyrics, and related papers, are held by the Australian Defence Force Academy.
