= Pastrana (musical) =

- Music: Allan McFadden
- Lyrics: Allan McFadden; Peter Northwood
- Book: Peter Northwood
- Productions: 1988 Sydney; 1989 Melbourne

Pastrana is an Australian musical by Allan McFadden and Peter Northwood. It is based on the true 19th century story of Julia Pastrana, a Mexican woman who was born with canine-like teeth and a thick mat of hair, but was also a singer. The musical traces her journey from Mexico to touring the United States and Europe under the managership of Charles Lent; a man whom she later married.

== Productions ==
Essington Productions and the Sydney Opera House presented a concert version in December 1988 at the Opera House's Studio, staged by Nancye Hayes and with Valerie Bader in the title role.

Pastrana was included in the 1989 season of Melbourne's Church Theatre (Australian Contemporary Theatre Company), performed from 2 to 26 August. Directed and designed by John Ellis, the cast included Santha Press as Pastrana, D.J. Foster as Charles Lent and Marian Mackenzie as Johanna Lent. Other cast members included Paul de Masson, Matthew Barker, Eric Donnison, Angela Johnson, Valentina Levkowicz, Patricia Pitney and Stephen Richie.

== Reception ==
The musical was well received by critics. The Church Theatre's production was nominated for five 1989 Melbourne Green Room Awards for music theatre: Production, Direction (John Ellis), Male Performer in a Leading Role (D.J. Foster), Male Performer in a Supporting Role (Paul De Masson) and Female Performer in a Supporting Role (Marian Mackenzie).
