= Esther Hannaford =

Australian singer and actor

- Born: Melbourne, Victoria, Australia
- Occupations: Actor, singer
- Years active: 2002–present

Esther Hannaford is an Australian singer and actor who has performed major roles in musical theatre in Australia. Her roles include Penny Pingleton in the original Australian cast of Hairspray, for which she received a Helpmann Award, Ann Darrow in King Kong, and Carole King in Beautiful.

== Early life ==
Hannaford grew up in Camberwell in the eastern suburbs of Melbourne. Her parents were a stay-at-home mother who later had her own clothing label and an electrician father who was a former SAS officer. She is the third of five children.

She took dance lessons from the age of five. As a child, she performed in the 1993 Melbourne season of Scrooge, and also appeared on television talent show New Faces dancing with three of her siblings to a medley of "Glory of Love" and "Gonna Make You Sweat (Everybody Dance Now)".

Growing up, Hannaford's interest was in contemporary dance, and she did not pursue singing seriously until after high school. She deferred a place in a contemporary dance course to study musical theatre.

== Career ==
Hannaford's early roles include And the World Goes 'Round at Chapel Off Chapel, Hair and Mame for The Production Company, Lisa in the Australasian tour of Mamma Mia!, multiple roles in Dean Bryant and Mathew Frank's Virgins in Melbourne and for the New York Musical Theatre Festival, Eurobeat - Almost Eurovision, and as a vocalist for Australian and international tours of Burn the Floor.

In 2009, she performed as Polly Brown in The Boyfriend for The Production Company, and in new Australian musicals Metro Street for the State Theatre Company of South Australia and Once We Lived Here at fortyfivedownstairs. She also performed with independent theatre company Four Larks in Orpheus and The Plague Dances (with Malthouse Theatre).

Hannaford received wide recognition as Penny Pingleton in the original Australian production of Hairspray in 2011. She then originated the role of Ann Darrow in Global Creatures' big-budget musical King Kong at the Regent Theatre, Melbourne in 2013.

In 2014 and 2015, she performed in a revival of Nick Enright and Max Lambert's musical Miracle City at the Hayes Theatre in Sydney, The 3 Mikados with Colin Lane and David Collins for the Melbourne International Comedy Festival, Billie Bendix in Nice Work If You Can Get It for The Production Company, and Skurry in Last Man Standing for the Melbourne Theatre Company.

In 2016, Hannaford played the leading role of Audrey in an Australian national tour of Little Shop of Horrors.

Hannaford released an indie folk EP The Great Egret in February 2015. She also appears on the cast recordings of Virgins, Once We Lived Here and Miracle City.

She starred in the Australian production of Beautiful: The Carole King Musical, as Carole King. In 2019 she was featured in ABC comedy Retrograde.

== Personal life ==
One of her brothers, Calvin Hannaford, dances with The Australian Ballet, and the other, Ross Hannaford, is a musical theatre performer.

Hannaford was diagnosed with Crohn's disease at the age of 18. It is the reason that she sings rather than dances, and was referred to obliquely in Retrograde.

== Awards ==
Hannaford has received two national Helpmann Awards and three Melbourne Green Room Awards for her performances in musical theatre, and various other nominations.

- 2018 Helpmann Award for Best Female Actor in a Musical, Beautiful
- 2013 Green Room Award for Female Artist in a Leading Role (Music Theatre), King Kong
- 2011 Helpmann Award for Best Female Actor in a Supporting Role in a Musical, Hairspray
- 2010 Green Room Award for Female Artist in a Featured Role (Music Theatre), Hairspray
- 2009 Green Room Award for Female Artist in a Leading Role (Music Theatre), Once We Lived Here
