= Shane Warne: The Musical =

- Music: Eddie Perfect
- Lyrics: Eddie Perfect
- Book: Eddie Perfect
- Basis: Shane Warne
- Premiere: 10 December 2008: Athenaeum Theatre, Melbourne
- Productions: 2008 Australian tour; 2013 Adelaide/Melbourne
- Awards: 2008 Green Room Award for Best New Australian Musical; 2009 Helpmann Award for Best New Australian Work

Shane Warne: The Musical is a musical comedy by Eddie Perfect based on the life of Australian cricketer Shane Warne. The Daily Telegraph described the musical as "a warts-and-all account of the spin bowler's controversy-laden career and roller-coaster personal life set to soul, rock, opera, gospel music – and even a bit of Bollywood."

== Plot ==
The musical consists of two acts: the first act covering Warne's aborted Australian rules football career, his marriage and his rise to success as a Test cricketer while the controversial issues that Warne was involved in; such as his drug offence, infidelity and the John the bookmaker controversy feature in the second act. The musical finishes with a chorus "Everyone's a little bit like Shane".

The musical contains a series of songs about various incidents in Warne's life both on and off the cricket field.

== Musical numbers ==
Act I

- "The Tale of Warne" – Shane Warne and company
- "Run" – Shane and company
- "A.I.S. (That's How You Spell Success)" – Michael Slater and company
- "We're Going There"
- "Piss It All Away" – Terry Jenner
- "Training Montage" – Shane and company
- "Hollywood" – Shane
- "That Ball" – Spectators
- "Payin' Attention Now"
- "Dancing With the Stars"
- "The Away Game" – Shane and company
- "My Name Is John" – Indian John and company

Act II

- "We Never Cross the Line"
- "What An S.M.Mess I'm In"
- "Donna Wright" – Donna Wright
- "Is the Sun the Moon?" – Simone Warne
- "Pick Up, Shane" – Terry
- "Shine Like Shane" – Shane and company
- "What About That, Shane?" – Simone
- "The Ashes" – Brigitte Warne, Simone, Terry and company
- "Spin Spin Spin"
- "It's Love"
- "Dancing With the Stars (Reprise)"

== Development ==
After five years of solo cabaret shows, Perfect had wanted to write a full-scale musical. Seeking a subject, Perfect reflected that: "with every headline I read about Warnie, came the realisation that here was a simple yet complicated, positive yet flawed, honest but naive, charming, philandering, freakishly talented and endlessly divisive man. And that, I thought, is a great character."

The Adelaide Cabaret Festival presented a work-in-progress showing on 17 June 2007 at the Dunstan Playhouse, Adelaide Festival Centre. The 2008 Melbourne International Comedy Festival included a further showing at the Hi Fi Bar and Ballroom.

== Productions ==
The full Australian production, directed by Neil Armfield with choreography by Gideon Obarzanek and with Perfect in the title role, opened at the Athenaeum Theatre in Melbourne on 10 December 2008. It toured to the Regal Theatre in Perth from 18 March 2009 and the Enmore Theatre in Sydney from 15 May 2009.

A 2013 revision included a new beginning and ending, new scenes and a revised structure, four new songs and new characters including Liz Hurley. It played short seasons in June for the Adelaide Cabaret Festival at Her Majesty's Theatre, then at Hamer Hall in Melbourne. This production, directed by Simon Phillips, had a cast that included Perfect, Lisa McCune, Shane Jacobson and Christie Whelan-Browne.

A cast album was recorded during the season at Hamer Hall and released in 2014.

== Reception ==
While initially suspicious of the project, Warne later gave his approval after watching the show, saying "I think Eddie and his team have written the musical in a respectful and sympathetic way, and that they have captured my fun, larrikin side."

The musical has been able to draw an audience that would not normally attend musicals with Perfect saying "You see young blokes making their way to their seats carrying armfuls of beers for their mates, just like they do at the cricket. It's like Reformation theatre when people were buying oranges to throw at the actors – why shouldn’t they have fun."

Reviews for the musical have been mainly positive.

- Herald Sun: "[The musical] is a wild, funny, outrageous, and by the end, surprisingly moving account of the champion spin bowler's life so far. [...] Among the fun, there's genuine respect for [Warne's] enormous talent but it doesn't gloss over his personal failings."
- The Independent "The mid-field marriage of a likeable star, fake bowling, plenty of sporting puns, and a moderate raunch factor had the crowds chuckling and clapping along. [...] [The musical makes] his life an appealingly debauched song and dance, playing with musical styles from nicely-harmonized gospel to gangsta rap."
- Australian Stage: "The story is thin, the songs are wordy and the sound wasn’t great, so many of the lyrics were lost. [...] Without wanting to cut down a tall poppy, there are certainly holes in the script and score. But who cares!? The performances by the ensemble cast are brilliant, the packed audience loved it, the upfront this-is-what-I-am-and-who-gives-a-shit-what-you-think-about-me attitude (reflecting Shane's own character) is refreshing, the show will bring in thousands of audience-goers who love sport and Shane, but rarely go to the theatre (which is fantastic), so what more can a new Australian musical do?"
- Gideon Haigh, The Guardian: "Perfect's vision is an almost unimprovable mingling of satire and homage, cheek and deference, music and comedy."

== Awards and nominations ==
- 2008 Green Room Awards
  - Best New Australian Musical (winner)
  - Male Artist in a Leading Role – Eddie Perfect (nominated)
  - Female Artist in a Featured Role – Rosemarie Harris (nominated)
  - Featured Ensemble Performance – The Ensemble (nominated)
- 2009 Helpmann Awards
  - Best New Australian Work – Eddie Perfect (winner)
  - Best Musical (nominated)
  - Best Choreography in a Musical – Gideon Obarzanek (nominated)
  - Best Male Actor in a Musical – Eddie Perfect (nominated)
- 2009 Victorian Premier's Literary Award
  - Prize for Musical Theatre Script (winner)
