= Caroline O'Connor (actress) =

British-Australian actress, singer, dancer

Caroline O'Connor AM
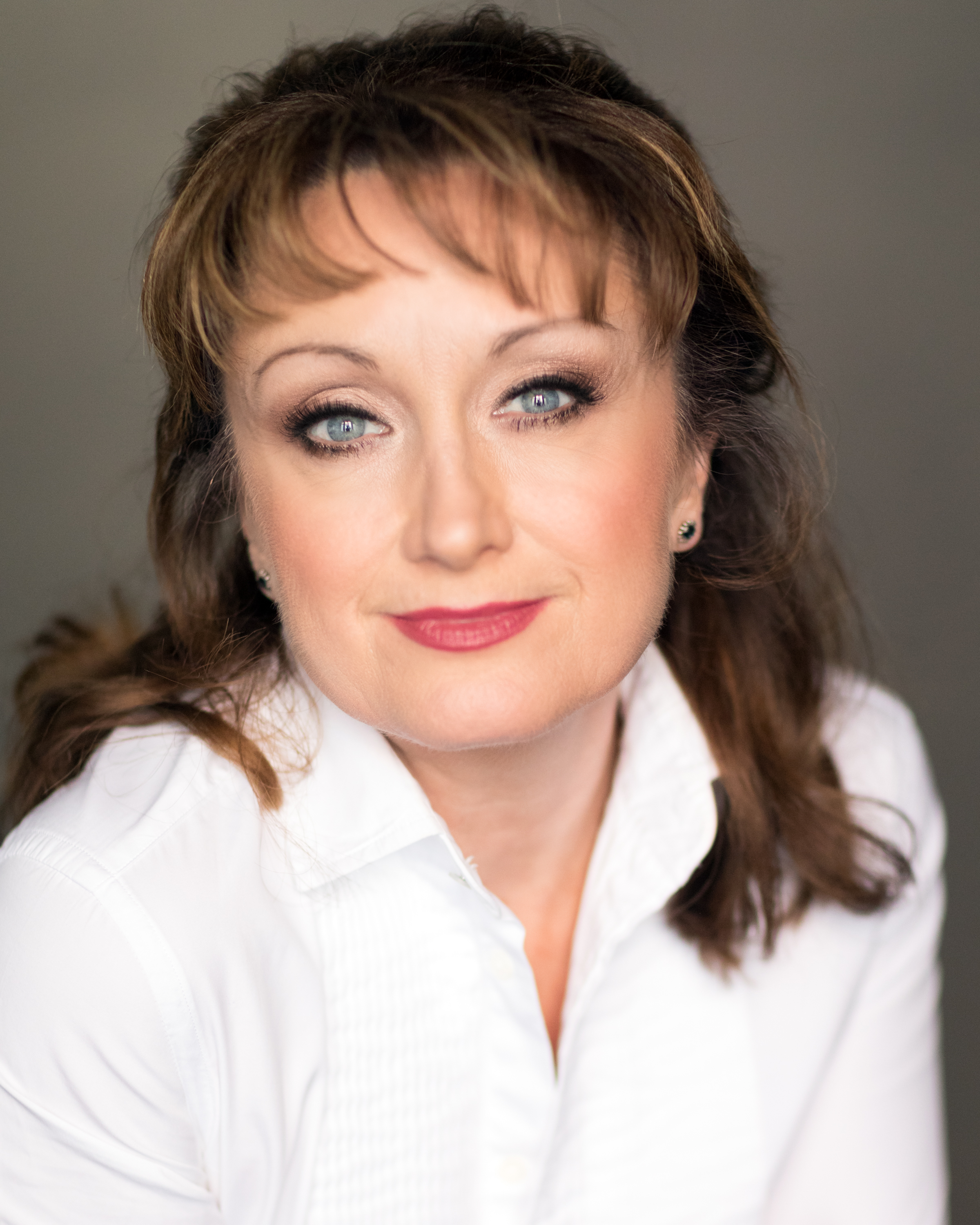
- Born: Caroline Ann O'Connor; 2 September 1962 (age 64); Oldham, Lancashire, England
- Occupations: Actress; singer
- Years active: 1981–present
- Spouse: Barrie Shaw (m. 1996)
- Website: www.carolineoconnor.com

Caroline Ann O'Connor AM (born 2 September 1962) is a British-born Australian actress and singer. For her theatre work she has won three Helpmann Awards: Best Female Actor in a Play for Edith Piaf in Piaf in 2001; in the same category for Judy Garland in End of the Rainbow in 2006; and Best Female Actor in a Musical for Reno Sweeney in Anything Goes in 2015. O'Connor has performed extensively throughout Australia, Broadway and on the London West End.

== Early life and education ==
Caroline Ann O'Connor was born in Oldham, Lancashire, England, to Irish parents. After her family migrated to Australia she was brought up and educated in Sydney, where she took Irish dance lessons with Joy Ransley and Valerie McGrath.

O'Connor had joined a touring dance troupe by August 1974, which travelled to Ireland, Paris, London, and the United States west coast. The troupe's members, including O'Connor, competed in the Irish Dancing World Championships, held in Dublin. At the age of 15 she returned to Dublin to appear in a dance competition and finished third. She later recalled, "When I was growing up in Rockdale as a little girl of Irish parents singing show tunes I didn't really fit in. Everyone was in their denim shorts and thongs and wanting to go down to Cronulla and I wanted to stay home and listen to Doris Day".

At 17, O'Connor returned to London and trained as a dancer at the Royal Ballet School, She worked for one year at the Australian Opera Ballet, and became an Australian citizen in 2007.

== Career ==
O'Connor made her musical theatre debut in an Australian tour of Oklahoma! in 1982, she later reminisced, "I was about 20 and I got into the show [and] I thought, 'This is where I'm meant to be.' I feel so fortunate." In the following May she took the role of Consuelo in West Side Story at Sydney's Her Majesty's Theatre. Subsequently, O'Connor worked both in Australia and the United Kingdom.

Upon return to London she was a member of the ensemble cast of Me and My Girl at the Leicester Haymarket Theatre in 1984 and then at the Adelphi Theatre. Other British theatre credits include, A Chorus Line, Cabaret, Hot Stuff, Chicago, Damn Yankees, West Side Story and as Ellie May in Show Boat for the Royal Shakespeare Company and Opera North in 1989. She understudied, and went on to perform, the role of Angel in the 1988 London production of The Rink by Kander and Ebb. She appeared in the UK premiere of the musical, Baby. Several of her successful early lead roles in the UK were in the town of Oldham, where she was born.

The entertainer returned to Australia by February 1994, where she took the role of Anita in a national tour of West Side Story, performing in Melbourne, Adelaide and Sydney and then Auckland in New Zealand. She won a Green Room Award. Back in London, her West End theatre performances included Mabel in Mack and Mabel for which she received an Olivier nomination for Best Actress in a Musical in 1996.

In 1998 O'Connor was back in Australia as Velma Kelly in Chicago for which she won a Green Room Award and the Mo Award for Female Musical Theatre Performer of the Year. She followed with roles in Man of La Mancha, Oklahoma! and concert productions of Funny Girl and Mack & Mabel. Her portrayal of Édith Piaf in Pam Gems's play Piaf in 2000 gained her three Australian theatre awards.

O'Connor's musical film work includes the role of Nini Legs in the Air in Baz Luhrmann's Moulin Rouge! (2001), and Ethel Merman in the Cole Porter biopic De-Lovely (2004). She featured on the De-Lovely soundtrack, singing "Anything Goes". In 2003 she made her Broadway debut as Velma Kelly in Chicago. Thereafter she performed in Australia, UK and United States.

The one-woman play, Bombshells (2004), was written especially for O'Connor by playwright, Joanna Murray-Smith. The original production was filmed for a broadcast by ABC Television. Bombshells toured to the Edinburgh Festival (where she won the Fringe First Award), London's West End at the Arts Theatre (for which she received a second Laurence Olivier Award nomination), and at the World Stage Festival in Toronto, Ontario.

O'Connor starred as Judy Garland in the 2005 world premiere of Peter Quilter's play, End of the Rainbow, at the Sydney Opera House. Following its Sydney and Melbourne seasons, she recorded a tribute album, A Tribute to Judy Garland, and reprised her Helpmann Award winning role at the Theatre Royal Sydney in 2006.

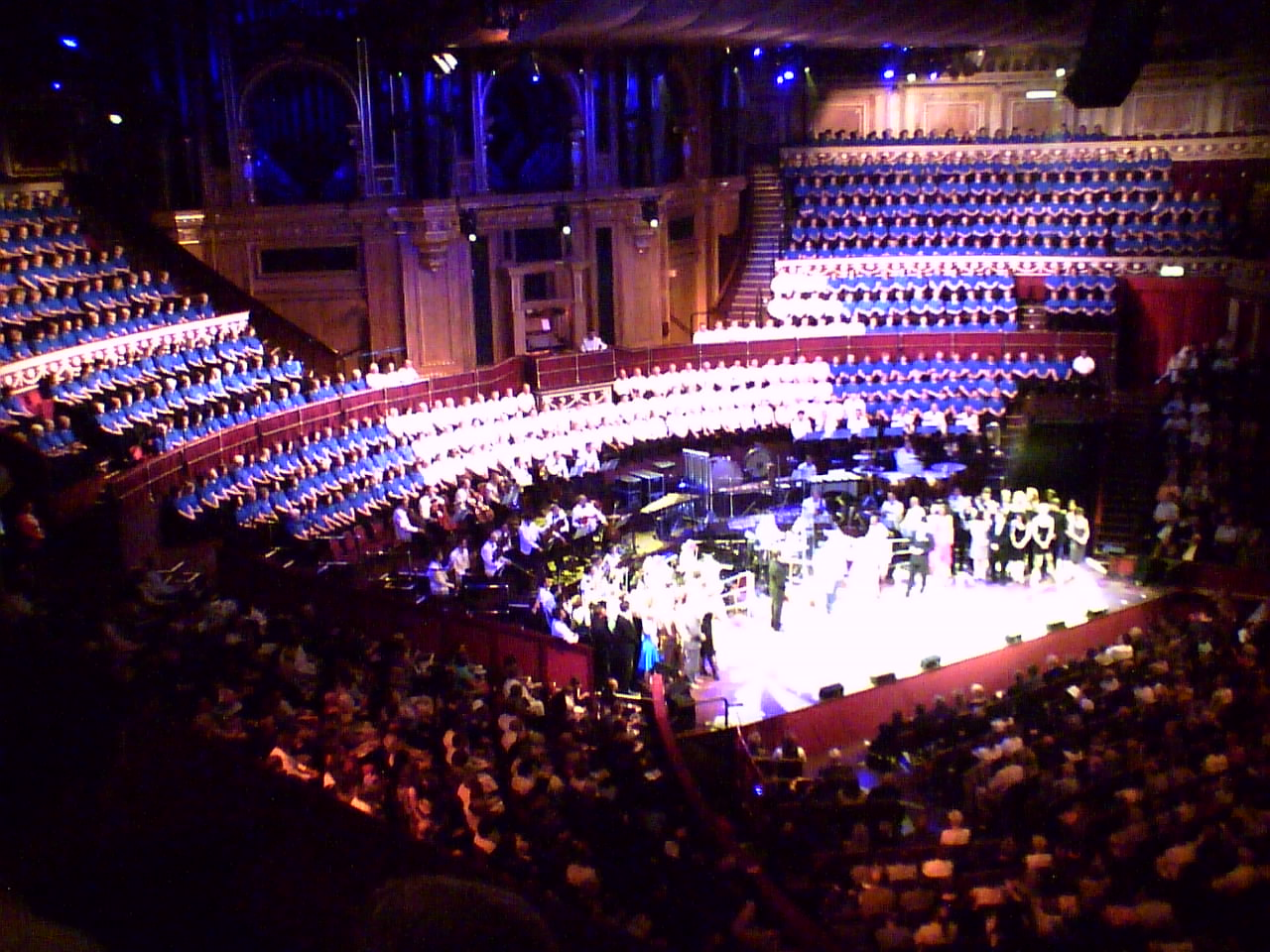
The Night of 1000 Voices 2007 concert 6 May 2007 at the Royal Albert Hall, starring O'Connor.

On 6 May 2007 O'Connor debuted at the Royal Albert Hall, performing in Derek Williams' arrangement of "How Lucky Can You Get" in the Kander and Ebb – The Night of 1000 Voices concert, conducted by David Firman, produced by Hugh Wooldridge with John Kander present. The number was reprised in Williams' arrangement for her shows at the Garrick Theatre 2010 season of The Showgirl Within, and for the opening in 2012 of Hamer Hall, Melbourne.

O'Connor starred in the premiere production of the musical The Hatpin, which opened in Sydney on 27 February 2008. In June of that year she played the title role, specifically written for her, in the premiere of David Williamson's play, Scarlett O'Hara at the Crimson Parrot, at the Melbourne Theatre Company.

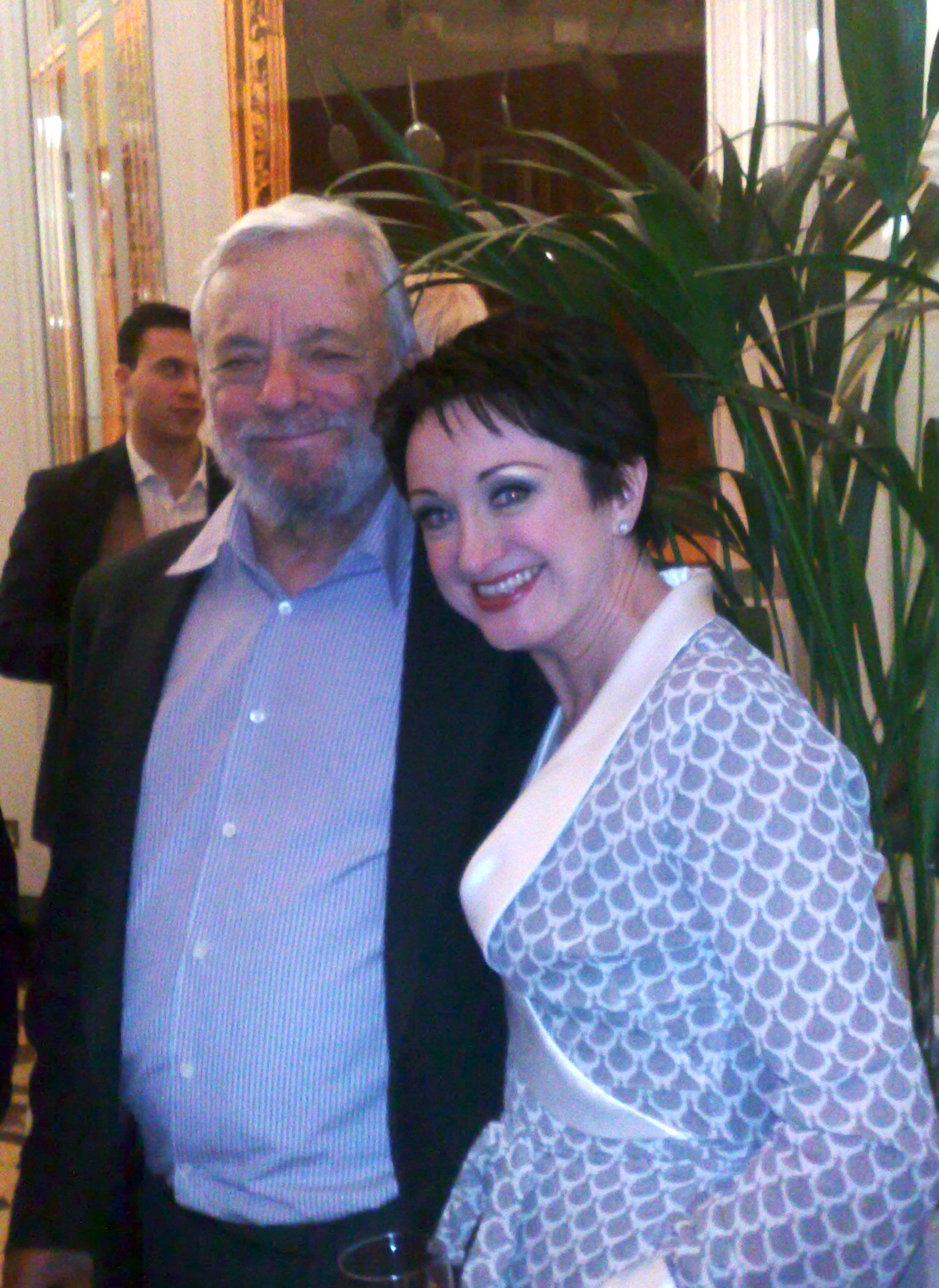
Stephen Sondheim and Caroline O'Connor
BBC Proms reception
Royal Albert Hall
1 August 2010

In March 2009 O'Connor reprised her role as Kelly in the 2009 Australian production of Chicago where she starred alongside Craig McLachlan and Gina Riley. In May 2010 she appeared as Mrs Cooper in the TV series, Lowdown. Also in that year she performed at the BBC Proms celebration of Stephen Sondheim's 80th birthday at the Royal Albert Hall. In May 2011 she starred as Mrs Lovett in the Théâtre du Châtelet production of Sondheim's Sweeney Todd: The Demon Barber of Fleet Street in Paris, with David Charles Abell as musical director. Sondheim has said that O'Connor was "the best Mrs Lovett I have ever heard."

Later in fall of 2011, O'Connor starred in a revival of Sondheim's Follies at the Chicago Shakespeare Theatre. In 2012, she sang the role of Sara Jane Moore in Sondheim's Assassins at the Milwaukee Repertory Theatre.

In 2012 O'Connor originated the role of Miss Shields in a limited run of A Christmas Story: The Musical. It ran for 51 performances in late 2012, and received a nomination for the 2013 Best Musical Tony Award, for its track "You'll Shoot Your Eye Out", featuring O'Connor, which was broadcast live on CBS during the 67th Tony Awards show on 9 June 2013.

As a recording artist O'Connor has released four solo CDs, What I Did for Love (1998), A Tribute to Piaf (2001), From Stage to Screen (2001) and A Tribute to Garland (2005). She has contributed to numerous cast recordings and compilations.

From April 2017 through to March 2018, O'Connor played Countess Lily in the musical, Anastasia, at the Broadhurst Theatre on Broadway, New York. From May to June 2018 she starred in a London production of The Rink and in mid-August she portrayed Garland in The Production Company's The Boy from Oz in Melbourne.

In September 2018, O'Connor took the part of The Old Lady in a production of the operetta Candide, directed by Mitchell Butel and staged at the Sydney Opera House with the Sydney Philharmonia Choirs, Sydney Youth Orchestra, and stars from Opera Australia.

O'Connor began 2019 by starting in the critically-acclaimed and sold-out Darlinghurst Theatre Company production of The Rise and Fall of Little Voice (directed by Shaun Rennie). She followed this with a staged concert of the rarely performed musical Applause at Hayes Theatre, playing the leading role of Margo Channing.

In May 2024, O'Connor reprised her 2018 role as The Old Lady in Candide in a co-production by the State Theatre Company South Australia (STCSA) and State Opera South Australia, performed for three nights in Her Majesty's Theatre, Adelaide, under the direction of Mitchell Butel, who was now STCSA artistic director.

In 2024 from 7 November through to 2 March, O'Connor played the role of Dolly Levy in the Paris version of Hello Dolly, directed by Stephen Mear at the Lido 2 Paris. Originally scheduled to finish in January, Hello Dolly was extended two months after receiving glowing reviews.

In September 2025, O'Connor returned to New York for a tribute show, "Caroline O'Connor, My Musical Life" at The Green Room 42, accompanied by Daniel Edmonds.

In October 2026, O'Connor will join Don Black's From The Heart revue at the Garrick Theatre.

== Personal life ==
Caroline O'Connor is married to Barrie Shaw, a musician and in 2017 they celebrated their 21st anniversary. In 2018, they sold their Bondi Junction property and moved to a riverside property in Noosa. In 2022, they also sold their UK home in Surrey.

== Performances ==
=== Stage ===
Year	Title	Role	Director	Notes	Ref.
1983	West Side Story	Consuelo	Dobbs Franks	Her Majesty's Theatre, Sydney, Princess Theatre	
1994	West Side Story	Anita	Ian Judge	Princess Theatre, Festival Theatre	
1994	Mack and Mabel – In Concert		Grace Barnes	State Theatre (Melbourne), State Theatre (Sydney)	
1995–97	West Side Story	Anita	Ian Judge	Capitol Theatre, State Theatre (Melbourne), ASB Theatre, Auckland	
1998	A One Night Stand with...		Gary Young	State Theatre (Melbourne)	
1998	Sydney Symphony Orchestra	Soprano		Sydney Opera House Concert Hall	
1998	Chicago – The Musical	Velma Kelly	Walter Bobbie	Her Majesty's Theatre, Melbourne	
1999	Chicago – The Musical	Velma Kelly	Walter Bobbie	Capitol Theatre	
1999	Funny Girl	Fanny Brice	Gary Young	State Theatre, Melbourne	
2000	Chicago – The Musical	Velma Kelly	Walter Bobbie	Lyric Theatre, Brisbane	
2000	Piaf	Edith Piaf	Adam Cook	Playhouse, Melbourne, Footbridge Theatre	
2011	Sweeney Todd	Mrs. Lovett	Lee Blakeley	Théâtre du Châtelet	
2015	Anything Goes	Reno Sweeney	Dean Bryant	Australian Tour	
2016	Funny Girl	Fanny Brice	Gale Edwards	Arts Centre Melbourne	
2017–18	Anastasia	Countess Lily Malevsky-Malevitch	Darko Tresnjak	Hartford Stage, Hartford; Broadhurst Theatre, New York City	
2018	The Rink	Anna	Adam Lenson	Southwark Playhouse	
2019	Kiss of the Spider Woman	Spider Woman / Aurora	Dean Bryant	Melbourne Theatre Company	
2022	9 to 5	Roz Keith	Jeff Calhoun	Australian Tour	
2024	Hello, Dolly!	Dolly Levi	Stephen Mear	Lido 2 Paris	

== Film ==
Year	Title	Role	Notes	Ref.
2001	Moulin Rouge!	Nini Legs In The Air		
2004	De-Lovely	Ethel Merman	Musical performer on "Anything Goes"	

== Discography ==
=== Albums ===
Title	Album details
What I Did for Love	Released: 1998; Formats: CD; Label: Jay Records (CDJAY 1314)
A Tribute to Piaf	Released: 2000; Formats: CD; Label: Artists Unlimited (CD001)
From Stage to Screen	Released: 2001; Formats: CD; Label: Jay Records (CDJAY 1305)
A Tribute to Garland	Released: 2005; Formats: CD, digital; Label: Artists Unlimited

== Awards ==
In 2020, O'Connor became a Member of the Order of Australia (AM) for significant service to the performing arts, particularly to musical theatre.

=== Green Room Award ===
- 1994 Green Room Award for Female Artist in a Featured Role (Music Theatre) − West Side Story
- 1998 Green Room Award for Female Artist in a Leading Role (Music Theatre) − Chicago
- 2000 Green Room Award for Female Artist in a Leading Role (Music Theatre) − Piaf

=== Helpmann Awards ===
The Helpmann Awards is an awards show, celebrating live entertainment and performing arts in Australia, presented by industry group Live Performance Australia since 2001. Note: 2020 and 2021 were cancelled due to the COVID-19 pandemic.

Year	Nominee / work	Award	Result	Ref.
2001	Caroline O'Connor – Piaf	Helpmann Award for Best Female Actor in a Play	Won	
2002	Caroline O'Connor – Bombshell	Best Female Actor in a Play	Nominated	
2003	Caroline O'Connor – Man of La Mancha	Helpmann Award for Best Female Actor in a Musical	Nominated	
2006	Caroline O'Connor – End of the Rainbow	Best Female Actor in a Musical	Won	
2014	Caroline O'Connor – Gypsy: A Musical Fable	Best Female Actor in a Musical	Nominated	
2015	Caroline O'Connor – Anything Goes	Best Female Actor in a Musical	Won	

=== Mo Awards ===
The Australian Entertainment Mo Awards (commonly known informally as the Mo Awards), were annual Australian entertainment industry awards. They recognise achievements in live entertainment in Australia from 1975 to 2016. Caroline O'Connor won five awards in that time.

Year	Nominee / work	Award	Result (wins only)
1994	Caroline O'Connor	Supporting Musical Theatrical Performer of the Year	Won
1996	Caroline O'Connor	Supporting Musical Theatrical Performer of the Year	Won
1998	Caroline O'Connor	Female Musical Theatre Performer of the Year	Won
1999	Caroline O'Connor	Female Musical Theatre Performer of the Year	Won
2000	Caroline O'Connor	Female Musical Theatre Performer of the Year	Won
