= Once We Lived Here =

2009 Australian musical

Once We Lived Here is an Australian musical with book and lyrics by Dean Bryant and music by Mathew Frank.

It concerns a farming family struggling to hold onto their sheep station, 'Emoh Ruo', after years of drought, fire and financial pressure. The family gather for a long weekend where shadows of the past come to the forefront.

The musical premiered in September 2009 at fortyfivedownstairs in Melbourne. The cast included Esther Hannaford, Sally Bourne, Christie Whelan, Sam Ludeman and Warwick Allsopp. Subsequent productions include fringe productions at the King's Head Theatre in London in 2014, and the Blue Room Theatre in Perth in 2017.

Once We Lived Here received a Green Room Award for New Australian Musical in 2010.
