= Prodigal (musical) =

Australian musical by Dean Bryant and Mathew Frank

Prodigal, originally titled Prodigal Son, is an Australian musical by Dean Bryant and Mathew Frank.

It premiered on 19 January 2000 at Chapel Off Chapel in Melbourne as part of the Midsumma Festival. It received a Green Room Award for Original Music and Lyrics in the Music Theatre category.

An off-Broadway production played at the York Theatre in 2002.

== Synopsis ==
As the OVERTURE fades, we meet Luke Flannery and his family; father Harry, mother Celia and brother Kane, who live in Eden, Australia ((PICTURE POSTCARD PLACE). Luke is 18 and about to join the Flannery fishing business, but isn't so sure that he wants to spend another eighteen years playing (HAPPY FAMILIES). Harry gives him a car for his birthday, to use for business (much to Kane's disgust). Luke announces he has been offered a place at Sydney University, and wants to go. Celia tries to keep the mood light (PICTURE POSTCARD PLACE - REPRISE). Against Harry's wishes, Luke runs away to Sydney (RUN WITH THE TIDE).

He moves into a warehouse apartment with Maddy, a performance artist, who encourages him to shift his perspective and see the world with BRAND NEW EYES0. They quickly become best friends, but when Maddy tells Luke she loves him, he is forced to introduce his boyfriend from University, Zach. A few weeks later, Zach moves into the apartment, and the three get better acquainted sharing childhood memories (WHEN I WAS A KID). Luke realizes he has shut his family out of his life, so calls home to tell his parents his news, who don't react as he hoped (MY BOY). Luke responds by going out, experimenting with drugs, letting all responsibility slide (OUT OF MYSELF). Maddy throws him out after one late night party too many, and eventually Zach dumps him too (SET ME FREE). Luke decides to return home and mend the bridges he burned (EPIPHANY).

The homecoming doesn't go as planned, as neither Luke nor Harry can bring themselves to admit they could be wrong, and Luke is thrown out of the house. When Harry stops Celia from going after him, she pushes him aside (LOVE THEM AND LEAVE THEM ALONE). Harry takes his frustration out on Kane, and goes down to the pub. Celia tracks Luke down at the local pub, and asks him to be a little more understanding of Harry, but Luke won't back down in his beliefs (WHERE DOES IT GET YOU). She leaves him for the night, and Luke receives a phone call, telling him to meet Kane at the shipyard. At the docks he is attacked and badly injured. Maddy performs the piece she developed through meeting Luke and opening up to her own dad (MADDY'S PIECE).

Kane comes home the next day to find out from Harry that Luke is in the hospital. Kane admits responsibility, but before walking out points out Harry isn't blameless himself. Harry goes to the hospital and relieves Celia of her watch over Luke (LULLABY).

Months later. Luke has healed, but won't leave the family home, even with Celia and Harry's encouragement. They spring a surprise on him; they've invited Maddy down. She reminds Luke of why he left Eden originally and helps him to reimagine the life he went searching for. He decides to return to Sydney, and try again (FINALE). Luke heads out to show Maddy around his home town, leaving Harry and Celia in the family kitchen.
