= Wayne Scott Kermond =

Australian musical theatre performer

Wayne Scott Kermond is an Australian musical theatre performer.

== Early life ==
He was born into a show business family. His grandfather, Gordon (1910–1997), and his uncles Norman (1920–2016) and Eric "Tibby" – The Kermond Brothers – were Tivoli performers and his parents (Warren and Pamela) were also performers.

Kermond started an apprenticeship at Hawker De Havilland at Bankstown Airport, then worked backstage at the Theatre Royal, Sydney.

== Career ==
In 1982, Kermond played Tom Thumb in the musical Barnum. He then played Baby John and Arab in West Side Story, Waxy Collins in Sydney Theatre Company's Jonah Jones, and Mike in A Chorus Line. He played Cosmo Brown in the Australian and Asian tour of Singin' in the Rain which commenced in 2001. For The Production Company, Kermond played Max Bialystock in The Producers, Moonface Martin in Anything Goes (and the subsequent national tour for Opera Australia) and the Modern Major General in The Pirates Of Penzance.

His television and film credits include The Shiralee, The Heroes and its sequel Heroes II: The Return and Kings in Grass Castles. He was a principal motion capture performer on the animated films Happy Feet and Happy Feet Two.

== Oral history ==
Kermond was interviewed in 1994 by Bill Stephens. The recording can be found at the National Library of Australia.

== Awards ==
He received a Green Room Award for male artist in a leading role for The Producers, and has been nominated for the Helpmann Award for Best Male Actor in a Musical for Singin' in the Rain and The Producers.

=== Mo Awards ===
The Australian Entertainment Mo Awards (commonly known informally as the Mo Awards), were annual Australian entertainment industry awards. They recognise achievements in live entertainment in Australia from 1975 to 2016. Wayne Scott Kermond won six awards in that time.

Year	Nominee / work	Award	Result (wins only)
2001	Wayne Scott Kermond	Male Musical Theatre Performer of the Year	Won
2004	Wayne Scott Kermond	Variety Performer of the Year	Won
2006	Wayne Scott Kermond	Dance Performer of the Year	Won
2007	Wayne Scott Kermond	Male Musical Theatre Performer of the Year	Won
2008	Wayne Scott Kermond	Male Musical Theatre Performer of the Year	Won
2008	Wayne Scott Kermond	Versatile Performer of the Year	Won
