= Shu-Cheen Yu =

Chinese-Australian opera singer

Shu-Cheen Yu 俞淑琴
- Born: 1962 (age 63–64); Yanggao County, Shanxi, China
- Genres: Classical music; Chinese folk music
- Occupation: Soprano singer
- Label: ABC Classics
- Website: www.shucheenyu.com.au

Shu-Cheen Yu is a Chinese-Australian opera singer. Her album Lotus Moon was nominated at the ARIA Music Awards of 2001 for Best Classical Album.

Born in China, she established herself as a folk singer, releasing five albums. In 1987, she moved to Australia and became a cleaner. She took on a three-year opera course and was cast in a 1990 production of the musical Chess, continuing onto other productions.

== Discography ==
List of albums, with selected details and chart positions
Title	Album details	Peak chart positions
Title	Album details	AUS
Lotus Moon (with Symphony Australia)	Released: 2001; Label: ABC Classics (461 679–2); Format: CD	70
Willow Spirit Song: Folksongs of the Orient	Released: 2002; Label: ABC Classics; Format: CD	—
Serenade	Released: 2003; Label: ABC Classics; Format: CD	—
Lotus Dreams	Released: 2014; Label: Move; Format: CD	—

== Awards and nominations ==
The ARIA Music Awards is an annual awards ceremony that recognises excellence, innovation, and achievement across all genres of Australian music. They commenced in 1987.

Year	Nominee / work	Award	Result	Ref.
2001	Lotus Moon	Best Classical Album	Nominated	
