= Jon Ewing =

Australian actor

- Born: Jon Douglas Ewing; 6 October 1936; Paddington, New South Wales, Australia
- Died: 14 March 2014 (aged 77)
- Education: Sydney Boys High School
- Known for: stage work
- Notable work: La Cage aux Folles
- Awards: Green Room Award

Jon Douglas Ewing (6 October 1936 – 14 March 2014) was an Australian actor and director best known for his stage work.

== Life and career ==
Ewing was born in Paddington, New South Wales and attended Sydney Boys High School. He studied under Hayes Gordon and in 1958 helped to establish the Ensemble Theatre.

He played Albin in the 1985 original Australian cast of La Cage aux Folles, for which he received a Green Room Award. Other stage roles include Camelot, Cabaret, Tarantara! Tarantara!, The Threepenny Opera, Candide, The Venetian Twins, Sweeney Todd, Nicholas Nickleby and The Phantom of The Opera.

His screen roles include The Last Bastion and Bliss (for which he was nominated for an AFI Award for Best Actor in a Supporting Role).

He appeared on TV in Waterloo Station, Homicide, A Country Practice, The Mavis Bramston Show and Consider Your Verdict.
