= Queenie van de Zandt =

Australian actress

Queenie van de Zandt is an Australian actress, singer, comedian, recording artist, writer, and arts educator. She is founder of the Australian Musical Theatre Academy.

== Early life and education ==
She was born in Canberra to Dutch immigrants.

== Career ==
Van de Zandt relocated to Sydney in 1992 and began her career performing in musicals and stage plays such as Hair, Cabaret, Les Misérables, Anything Goes, Threepenny Opera, Furious, Barmaids, After January, and The Boy from Oz. She has since worked extensively in musical theatre, plays, and cabaret, as well as appearing on television and in film and releasing several albums.

As of 2016 she was also regularly performing as her comedy character and alter-ego, Jan van de Stool, a Dutch-born musical therapist.

In 2022, Van de Zandt performed Blue: The Songs of Joni Mitchell.

== Other activities ==
Van de Zandt performed in various cabaret workshops and performances. In 2022, Van de Zandt hosted cabaret workshops in the Canberra area.

== Filmography ==
| Year | Title | Role | Notes |
|---|---|---|---|
| 2021-25 | The Newsreader | Donna Gillies | 5 episodes |
| 2023 | Safe Home | Magistrate Matthews | 1 episode |
| 2022 | Upright | Sage / Tammy | 3 episodes |
| 2021 | Five Bedrooms | Janelle | 1 episode |
| 2020 | Remotely Funny | Jan Van de Stool | 1 episode |
| 2015 | Winners & Losers | Belinda Yiap | 2 episodes |
| 2012 | Dance Academy | Aunty Sara | 1 episode |
| 2010 | Girl Clock! | Margo | |
| 2008 | Very Small Business | Tina | 4 episodes |
| 2005 | Da Kath and Kim Code | Storeperson | TV movie |
| 2005 | Let Loose Live | Various | 2 episodes |
| 2004 | All Saints | Gwynneth | 1 episode |
| 2004 | Salem's Lot | Betty | 1 episode |
| 2001 | Rubber Gloves | Neighbour | Short |

== Theatre ==
| Year | Title | Role | Notes | Ref |
|---|---|---|---|---|
| 2024 | Blue: The Songs of Joni Mitchell | Joni Mitchell | Hayes Theatre Co | |
| 2024 | Diva | | | |
| 2021 | Choose Your Own Adventure | | | |
| 2021 | Next To Normal | Diana Goodman | | |
| 2019 | Jan Van de Stool | | Scout Hall | |
| 2016 | Follies | | Melbourne Recital Centre | |

== Awards ==
- 2018: Glugs Award - The Lee Young Award for the Most Outstanding Cabaret Performance for Blue: The Songs of Joni Mitchell
- 2017: Broadway World - Sydney Award - Best Cabaret Performance for BLUE: The Songs of Joni Mitchell
- 2017: Broadway World - Sydney Award - Best Cabaret for BLUE: The Songs of Joni Mitchell
- 2008: Glug Award – Jeffry Joynton-Smith Memorial Award for Best Supporting Actress for her performance as Izzy in Rabbit Hole
- 1997: MEAA ACT Green Room Award for Best Performance for her performance as Alison/Louise/Spokesperson in ?

== Nominations ==
- 2018 Helpmann Award for Best Cabaret Performer for her performance in BLUE: The Songs of Joni Mitchell
- 2018 Sydney Theatre Award for Best Cabaret Production for BLUE: The Songs of Joni Mitchell
- 2015 Green Room Award for Best Actress in a Leading Role for The Witch in Into the Woods
- 2015 Theatre People Pro-Choice Award for Best Actress in a Musical (limited run) for The Witch in Into the Woods
- 2010 Glugs Award - Norman Kessell Award for Best Actress for her performance as Beverly in Abigail's Party
- 2009 Green Room Award for Best Supporting Performer in Theatre – Companies (joint nomination along with Jennifer Vuletic and Natalie Gamsu) for their performances as Women of Troy in Women of Troy
- 2008 Green Room Award for Best Cabaret Artiste for the International Melbourne Comedy Festival season of I GET THE MUSIC IN YOU an evening with Jan van de Stool
- 2007 AussieTheatre.com Award for Cabaret Show of the Year for Cabaret – in 12 Easy Steps
- 2007 AussieTheatre.com Award for Cabaret Artist of the Year for Cabaret – in 12 Easy Steps
- 2006 Sydney Theatre Award for Best Cabaret for her one-woman show I GET THE MUSIC IN YOU an evening with Jan van de Stool
- 2005 Green Room Award for Female Artist in a Supporting Role for her performance as Vicki Nichols in The Full Monty – The Musical
- 2004 Nomination, Helpmann Award for Best Female Actor in a Supporting Role in a Musical, for her performance as Mrs Sowerberry in Oliver!

== Sources ==
- Queenie van de Zandt at IMDb
