= Matt Hetherington =

Australian actor

Matt Hetherington (born 25 May) is an Australian singer and actor, who rose to prominence as a contestant on the first series of The Voice (Australia). He has appeared in musicals Next to Normal, Green Room Award, Dirty Rotten Scoundrels Green Room Award and Sydney Theatre Award and The Full Monty, the latter for which he won the Helpmann Award for Best Male Actor in a Musical.

== Credits ==
=== Television ===
- Dr Blake Mysteries
- City Homicide
- Marshall Law
- Stingers
- The Voice (Australia)

=== Stage ===
- Dirty Rotten Scoundrels (2009)
- Flowerchildren (2011)
- The Full Monty (2004)
- Hair (2003)
- Happy Days - The Arena Spectacular
- Next to Normal (2011)
- Shane Warne: The Musical (2008)
- Sweet Charity (2003)
- Promises, Promises (2012)
- Gypsy (2013)
- North by Northwest (2015)
