= Laurie Cadevida =

American actress

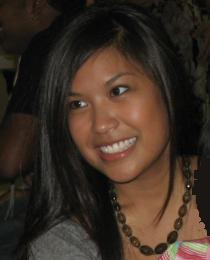
- Born: Laurie Kristi Cadevida
- Occupation: Stage actress
- Relatives: Kris Lawrence (brother)

Laurie Kristi Cadevida is a musical theatre performer and the younger sister of Filipino singer Kris Lawrence. She was born and raised in Los Angeles, California. She appeared on Ed McMahon's short-lived PAX Network talent competition Next Big Star. She is best known for her performances as "Kim" in Miss Saigon.

She played Kim in Miss Saigon on the Australian National Tour 2007, the US National Tour, and the Armory Theatre. She has also played Amneris in Aida and Poopsie in The Pajama Game. She has appeared in the Australian game show Spicks and Specks as a guest.

She won the award for Best Female Actor in a Musical at the 2007 Helpmann Awards for her role as 'Kim' in the Australian tour of Miss Saigon (2007–2008).
