= Delia Hannah =

New Zealand actress

Delia Hannah is a New Zealand actress and singer, notable for leading roles in musical theatre in Australia and New Zealand.

== Awards ==
=== Mo Awards ===
The Australian Entertainment Mo Awards (commonly known informally as the Mo Awards), were annual Australian entertainment industry awards. They recognise achievements in live entertainment in Australia from 1975 to 2016. Delia Hannah won one award in that time.

Year	Nominee / work	Award	Result (wins only)
1992	Delia Hannah	Female Musical Theatre Performer the Year	Won
