= Green Room Awards =

Melbourne performing arts awards

- Awarded for: Excellence in: Cabaret; dance; drama; fringe theatre; musical theatre; opera
- Location: Melbourne, Australia
- Presented by: Green Room Awards Association
- Established: 1982
- Website: www.greenroom.org.au

The Green Room Awards are Australian peer awards which recognise excellence in cabaret, dance, theatre companies, independent theatre, musical theatre, contemporary and experimental performance, and opera. The awards, which were established in 1982, are based in Melbourne, Victoria.

== History ==
The Green Room Awards were established in 1982 by a group of theatre people, with the inaugural awards ceremony held in 1983. Blair Edgar and Steven Tandy formed the Green Room Awards Association.

The Association's 40th awards ceremony, took place at Melbourne's Capitol Theatre to a sell-out audience on 29 May 2023.

== Description ==
=== Association ===
The Green Room Awards Association is composed of members of Melbourne's performing arts community, including journalists, performers, writers, directors, choreographers, academics, theatre technicians and administrators. It is based in Melbourne, Victoria.

=== Awards ===
The Green Room Awards recognise excellence in cabaret, dance, theatre companies, independent theatre, musical theatre, contemporary and experimental performance, and opera.

== Governance and people ==
The current patron of the association is Liz Jones. Former patrons include Uncle Jack Charles.

As at April 2023, the president of the association is Anton Berezin, vice president Dean Drieberg, secretary Weng Yi Wong and treasurer Emily Harvey.

== Award categories ==
As of 2013, award categories include:

=== Theatre (companies) ===
- Production
- Direction
- Female actor
- Male actor
- Ensemble
- Set/costume
- Lighting
- Sound/composition
- Writing/adaptation

=== Theatre (independent) ===
- Production
- Direction
- Performers (2 awards)
- Ensemble
- Design
- Lighting design
- Sound/composition
- Writing

=== Music theatre ===
- Production
- Direction
- Choreography
- Musical direction
- Female actor in a leading role
- Male actor in a leading role
- Female actor in a featured role
- Male actor in a featured role
- Ensemble
- Design – Lighting and/or sound
- Design – Set and/or costume

=== Opera ===
- Production
- Conductor
- Direction
- Principal female
- Principal male
- Supporting female
- Supporting male
- Design

=== Dance ===
- Concept and realisation
- Male dancer
- Female dancer
- Ensemble
- Design
- Sound and music

=== Cabaret ===
- Production
- Artiste
- Musical direction
- Writing
- Direction

=== Alternative and hybrid performance ===
- Production

=== Named awards ===
Several named awards can be given:

- Lifetime Achievement Award
  - made to a person whose outstanding work has had a significant impact in Melbourne.
- Outstanding Technical Achievement Award
  - for technical contributions behind the scenes.
- Best New Writing Award
  - for an exceptional new script or production.
- Betty Pounder Award for Original Choreography
  - in memory of choreographer Betty Pounder whose work encompassed all dance genres and their inclusion in plays and opera, is given for choreographic work in any area.

== Recipients ==
Previous winners of the awards include Dale Ferguson, David Hersey, Stephen Baynes, Greg Horsman, Eddie Perfect, Laurie Cadevida, Stephen Daldry, Genevieve Lemon, Michael Dameski, Julian Gavin, and Steve Mouzakis.

Recipients of the Production award in each category include the following, with the year relating to the year of the award ceremony:

=== Theatre companies ===
- 1984: Steaming (Wilton Morley)
- 1985: Don Juan (Anthill)
- 1986: Nicholas Nickleby (Sydney Theatre Company)
- 1987: Away (Playbox)
- 1988: A Day in the Death of Joe Egg (Melbourne Theatre Company)
- 1989: The First Born Trilogy (Melbourne Theatre Company)
- 1990: Dreams In An Empty City (Melbourne Theatre Company)
- 1991: In Angel Gear (Performing Arts Projects)
- 1992: The Dybbuk (Gilgul Theatre)
- 1993: Sex Diary of an Infidel (Playbox)
- 1994: Angels in America (Melbourne Theatre Company)
- 1995: Angels in America Part 2 (Perestroika) (Melbourne Theatre Company)
- 2000-2004: n/a
- 2005: Twelve Angry Men (Adrian Bohm Presents/Arts Projects Australia)
- 2006:
- 2007: Harvest (Red Stitch Actors Theatre)
- 2008: The Tell-Tale Heart (Malthouse Theatre / Melbourne International Arts Festival)
- 2009: The Season at Sarsaparilla (Sydney Theatre Company / Melbourne Theatre Company)
- 2010: When the Rain Stops Falling (Brink Productions/Melbourne Theatre Company in association with Melbourne International Arts Festival)
- 2011: Thyestes (Malthouse Theatre / The Hayloft Project)
- 2012: Ganesh Versus the Third Reich (Back to Back Theatre / Malthouse Theatre / Melbourne Festival)
- 2013: Top Girls (Melbourne Theatre Company)
- 2014: The Bloody Chamber (Malthouse Theatre)
- 2015: Henry V (Bell Shakespeare)
- 2016: I Am a Miracle (Malthouse Theatre)
- 2017: Miss Julie (Melbourne Theatre Company)
- 2018: The Season (Tasmania Performs)
- 2019: The Bleeding Tree (Griffin Theatre Company presented by Arts Centre Melbourne)
- 2020: Barbara and the Camp Dogs (Belvoir in association with Vicki Gordon Music Productions presented by Malthouse Theatre)
- 2021: n/a
- 2022: Iphigenia in Splott (Red Stitch)
- 2023: The Picture of Dorian Gray (Sydney Theatre Company presented by Michael Cassel Group)
- 2024: My Sister Jill (Melbourne Theatre Company)
- 2025: Counting and Cracking (University of Melbourne Arts and Culture presents a Belvoir St Theatre and Kurinji co-production for Rising Festival)
- 2026: Meow Meow’s The Red Shoes (Malthouse Theatre with Belvoir and Black Swan State Theatre Company)

=== Independent theatre ===
- 1997: Verona (Magpie Theatre)
- 1998: Sunrise Boulevard (Rod Quantock presented by Token Productions)
- 1999: Who's Afraid of the Working Class (Melbourne Workers Theatre at Trades Hall)
- 2000: The Terms and Grammar of Creation (Sue Gore & Bill Garner)
- 2001: A Large Attendance in the Antechamber (Brian Lipson/Wendy Lasica and Associates)
- 2002: My Brother the Fish (Dan Scollay)
- 2003: The Grand Feeling (Paradigm Productions)
- 2004: The Black Swan of Trespass
- 2005: The Candy Butchers; The Eistedfodd
- 2006: The Laramie Project
- 2007: For Samuel Beckett (The Eleventh Hour Theatre)
- 2008: Holiday (Ranters Theatre)
- 2009: Oedipus, A Poetic Requiem (Inspired By Ted Hughes) (Liminal Theatre, Mary Sitarenos)
- 2010: Alice in Wonderland (Four Larks Theatre)
- 2011: Us (Grit Theatre / The Function Room)
- 2012: Save for Crying (doubletap / La Mama)
- 2013: Persona (Fraught Outfit and Theatre Works)
- 2014: The Sovereign Wife (Sisters Grimm/NEON)
- 2015: The Trouble With Harry (MKA, Darebin Arts Speakeasy and Melbourne Festival)
- 2016: SHIT (Dee & Cornelius as part of Neon Festival for Independent Theatre)
- 2017: Blood on the Dance Floor (Ilbijerri Theatre Company and Jacob Boehme)
- 2018: Song For A Weary Throat (Rawcus in association with Theatre Works)
- 2019: Apokalypsis (The Substation in association with Next Wave)
- 2020: Mr Burns: A Post-Electric Play (Lightning Jar Theatre in association with fortyfivedownstairs)
- 2021: 落叶归根 (Luò yè guīgēn) Getting Home (Cheryl Ho & Rachel Lee as part of Melbourne Fringe)
- 2022: Kerosene (Jack Dixon-Gunn in association with Theatre Works) and The Gospel According to Jesus Queen of Heaven (Ben Anderson Presents in association with Theatre Works) [in-person]; Juniper Wilde: Wilde Night In (The Social Validation Club as part of Melbourne Fringe) [digital]
- 2023: Gene Tree: Listen. Now. Again (St. Martins in association with Royal Botanic Gardens Victoria) and Paradise Lost (Bloomshed in association with Darebin Arts Speakeasy)
- 2024: Animal Farm (Bloomshed and Darebin Arts Speakeasy)
- 2025: Interior (Rawcus with The Substation)
- 2026: THE BLOK! (Darebin Arts Speakeasy and Melbourne Fringe)

=== Music theatre ===
- 1984: Song and Dance
- 1985: The Pirates of Penzance (Victoria State Opera)
- 1986: La Cage Aux Folles
- 1987: Guys and Dolls (Adelaide Festival Centre Trust)
- 1988: Cats (Cameron Mackintosh and the Really Useful Company)
- 1989: My Fair Lady (Victoria State Opera)
- 1990: Anything Goes (Hayden Attractions, Victoria State Opera & Bill Armstrong)
- 1991: Les Miserables (Cameron Mackintosh)
- 1992: The Phantom of the Opera (Cameron Mackintosh, Really Useful Productions)
- 1993: The King and I (Victorian Arts Centre/Victoria State Opera/Gordon Frost/Adelaide Festival Centre Trust)
- 1994: Hot Shoe Shuffle (David Atkins Enterprises)
- 1995: West Side Story (Victoria State Opera, International Management Group)
- 2000: The Boy From Oz (Ben Gannon and Robert Fox)
- 2001-2007: n/a
- 2008: Priscilla Queen of the Desert The Musical
- 2009: Billy Elliot The Musical (Universal Pictures Stage Entertainment, Working Title Films, Old Vic Productions)
- 2010: Jersey Boys (Dodger Theatricals, Newtheatricals, Dainty Consolidated Entertainment and Michael Watt)
- 2011: Mary Poppins
- 2012: n/a
- 2013: Chess (The Production Company)
- 2014: n/a
- 2015: Once (Barbara Broccoli, John N. Hart Jr, Patrick Milling Smith, Frederick Zollo, Brian Carmody, Michael G. Wilson, Orin Wolf, John Frost, New York Theatre Workshop, Melbourne Theatre Company)
- 2016: Strictly Ballroom (Global Creatures and Bazmark)
- 2017: Matilda the Musical (The Royal Shakespeare Company and Louise Withers, Michael Coppel and Michael Watt)
- 2018: Aladdin The Musical (Disney Theatrical Productions)
- 2019: Beautiful: The Carole King Musical (Michael Cassel Group)
- 2020: Come From Away (Junkyard Dog Productions and Rodney Rigby)
- 2021: n/a
- 2022: The Wedding Singer (David Venn Enterprises)
- 2023: Moulin Rouge! The Musical (Carmen Pavlovic, Gerry & Val Ryan, Bill Damaschke and Global Creatures) and Fun Home (Melbourne Theatre Company)
- 2024: Mary Poppins (Disney, Cameron Mackintosh and Michael Cassel Group)
- 2025: My Brilliant Career (Melbourne Theatre Company)
- 2026: Beetlejuice the Musical (Michael Cassel Group and Warner Bros. Theatre Ventures)

=== Music theatre - independent ===
- 2024: Kinky Boots (James Terry Collective)
- 2025: Share House - The Musical (Arts Centre Melbourne)
- 2026: Tarzan (James Terry Collective)

=== Opera ===
- 1984: Patience (Australian Opera)
- 1985: The Magic Flute (Victoria State Opera)
- 1986:
- 1987: Madam Butterfly (Victoria State Opera)
- 1988: Turandot (Victoria State Opera)
- 1989: L'incoronazione di Poppea (Australian Opera)
- 1990: The Turn of the Screw (Australian Opera)
- 1991: Faust (Victoria State Opera)
- 1992: Elektra (Victoria State Opera/Melbourne International Festival of the Arts)
- 1993: The Tales of Hoffmann (Victoria State Opera)
- 1994: Hansel and Gretel (Australian Opera)
- 1995: A Midsummer Night's Dream (Australian Opera)
- 2000: Billy Budd (Opera Australia)
- 2001: Capriccio (Opera Australia)
- 2002: Batavia (Opera Australia)
- 2003: Sweeney Todd (Opera Australia)
- 2004: Lulu (Opera Australia)
- 2005: Manon (Opera Australia)
- 2006: The Love for Three Oranges (Opera Australia)
- 2007: The Hive (ChamberMade Opera)
- 2008: Rusalka (Opera Australia)
- 2009: Arabella (Opera Australia); The Coronation of Poppea (Victorian Opera)
- 2010: Lady Macbeth of Mtsensk (Opera Australia)
- 2011: La Sonnambula (Opera Australia)
- 2012: Of Mice and Men (Opera Australia)
- 2013: Salome (Opera Australia)
- 2014: Nixon in China (Victorian Opera)
- 2015: Eugene Onegin (Opera Australia)
- 2016: Le nozze di Figaro (Opera Australia)
- 2017: The Ring Cycle (Opera Australia)
- 2018: King Roger (Opera Australia)
- 2019: Die Meistersinger (Opera Australia)
- 2020: Il Viaggio a Reims (Opera Australia)
- 2021: n/a
- 2022: Das Rheingold (Melbourne Opera)
- 2023: IPHIS (Lyric Opera and Theatre Works)
- 2024: Idomeneo (Victorian Opera)
- 2025: Candide (Victorian Opera)
- 2026: Orpheus & Eurydice (Opera Australia and Opera Queensland with Circa)

=== Cabaret ===
- 2000: Saucy Cantina (Moira Finucane and Jackie Smith)
- 2001: Jacques Brel Is Alive & Well & Living In Paris (Mark Jones, Susan-ann Walker, Sean Murphy, Anne Wood)
- 2002: Cabaret Tingel Tangel (The Soubrettes)
- 2003: Terra Paradiso
- 2004: Comedy Is Still Not Pretty
- 2005: The Burlesque Hour
- 2006:
- 2007: Tim Minchin (Tim Minchin)
- 2008: Meow Meow Beyond Beyond Glamour: The Remix (Meow Meow)
- 2009: Die Roten Punkte – Super Musikant
- 2010: Songs from the 86 Tram – The Bedroom Philosopher (City of Melbourne and Nan & Pop Records)
- 2011: Yana Alana and tha Paranas in Concert (Gasworks & Arts Victoria in association with Melbourne Workers Theatre and Yana Alana and tha Paranas)
- 2012: Little Match Girl (Malthouse Theatre in association with Meow Meow Revolution)
- 2013: Nasty! – Spanky (Candice McQueen)
- 2014: Between The Cracks (Yana Alana)
- 2015: Eurosmash (Die Roten Punkte)
- 2016: Briefs
- 2017: Hot Brown Honey (Darebin Arts Speakeasy and Briefs Factory)
- 2018: Yummy (Yummy, Melba Spiegeltent as part of Melbourne International Comedy Festival)
- 2019: Reuben Kaye (Reuben Kaye)
- 2020: Boobs (Selina Jenkins as part of Melbourne Fringe)
- 2021: Lousical the Musical (Lou Wall as part of Melbourne Fringe)
- 2022: Reuben Kaye: The Butch is Back (Pietagogetter as part of Melbourne International Comedy Festival)
- 2023: BROAD (Geraldine Quinn as part of Melbourne International Comedy Festival)
- 2024: Spunk Daddy (Autonomous Inventions and The Butterfly Club as part of Melbourne Fringe)
- 2025: The Passion of Saint Nicholas (Geraldine Quinn as part of the Melbourne International Comedy Festival)
- 2026: Jude Perl Tries to Finish a Sentence (Token Events as part of Melbourne International Comedy Festival)

=== Dance ===
- 1984: Swan Lake (Myer Music Bowl) (Australian Ballet)
- 1985: Equus (Australian Ballet)
- 1986:
- 1987: After Venice (Sydney Dance Company)
- 1988: The Shining (Sydney Dance Company)
- 1989: Vast (Australian Bicentennial Authority)
- 1990: Onegin (The Australian Ballet)
- 1991: The Leaves Are Falling (The Australian Ballet)
- 1992: Gemini (The Australian Ballet); No Strings Attached (DanceWorks)
- 1993: Nutcracker (The Australian Ballet)
- 1994: Nuti / Kikimora (Meryl Tankard Australian Dance Theatre)
- 1995: Divergence (The Australian Ballet)
- 2002: Tivoli (Sydney Dance Company & The Australian Ballet)
- 2003: Swan Lake (The Australian Ballet); Walkabout (Bangarra Dance Theatre)
- 2019: Overture (Arts House and Jo Lloyd)
- 2020: plenty serious Talk Talk (Vicki Van Hout in association with Arts House and Yirramboi Festival)
- 2021: n/a
- 2022: I am Maggie (Jonathan Homsey as part of Arts Centre Melbourne Take Over for Melbourne Fringe 2020)

=== Contemporary and experimental performance ===
- 2017: Complete Smut Art Auction (Punctum)
- 2018: We All Know What's Happening (Samara Hersch & Lara Thoms)
- 2019: Crackers n Dip with Chase n Toey (Carly Sheppard & Josh Twee presented by Arts House)
- 2020: Daddy (Joel Bray presented by Arts House and Yirramboi Festival); Diaspora (A Chamber Made work by Robin Fox and Collaborators in association with Melbourne International Arts Festival and The Substation); Those Who Rock (Joseph O'Farrell presented by Arts Centre Melbourne)
- 2021: n/a

=== Lifetime Achievement Award ===
Recipients include (year added where found):

- John Sumner (1985)
- Dame Peggy van Praagh
- Irene Mitchell
- Betty Pounder, choreographer, arts administrator
- Edna Edgley (1989)
- Dame Joan Hammond (1988)
- Ray Powell (ballet) helped found the Australian Ballet
- John McCallum (1990)
- Noel Pelly (1992)
- John Truscott (1993)
- Alfred Ruskin (1994)
- Anne Fraser (designer) (1995)
- Patricia Kennedy (1996)
- Dame Margaret Scott (1998) first director of the Australian Ballet School, founded 1964

== See also ==
- Performing arts of Australia
