= 19th Helpmann Awards =

2019 Australian live performance awards

- Date: 14–15 July 2019
- Location: Arts Centre Melbourne

The 19th Annual Helpmann Awards for live performance in Australia was held across two nights; the Curtain Raiser Ceremony on 14 July 2019 and the Awards Ceremony on 15 July 2019 at the Arts Centre Melbourne. Nominations were announced on 12 June 2019.

Major winners of the awards included cross-cultural play Counting & Cracking (seven awards including Best Play and Best New Australian Work), Indigenous musical Barbara and the Camp Dogs (four awards including Best Musical and Best Original Score) and opera The Magic Flute from Komische Oper Berlin (three awards including Best Opera).

== Recipients and nominations ==
=== Theatre ===
Best Play	Best Direction of a Play
Counting & Cracking – Belvoir and Co-Curious; Blackie Blackie Brown: The Traditional Owner of Death – Sydney Theatre Company and Malthouse Theatre; Harry Potter and the Cursed Child (Parts One and Two) – Sonia Friedman Productions, Colin Callender and Harry Potter Theatrical Productions, and Michael Cassel; Song for a Weary Throat – Rawcus; The Harp in the South: Part One and Part Two – Sydney Theatre Company; The Second Woman – Performing Lines	Eamon Flack and S. Shakthidharan – Counting & Cracking; Declan Green – Blackie Blackie Brown: The Traditional Owner of Death; Imara Savage – Saint Joan (Sydney Theatre Company); Kip Williams – The Harp in the South: Part One and Part Two
Best Female Actor in a Play	Best Male Actor in a Play
Kate Mulvany – Every Brilliant Thing (Belvoir); Helen Thomson – Mary Stuart (Sydney Theatre Company); Melita Jurisic – Arbus & West (Melbourne Theatre Company); Paula Arundell – Harry Potter and the Cursed Child (Parts One and Two); Sarah Snook – Saint Joan	Prakash Belawadi – Counting & Cracking; Amer Hlehel – TAHA (Arts Centre Melbourne by arrangement with Arts Projects Australia); Kelton Pell – Summer of the Seventeenth Doll (Black Swan State Theatre Company); Wayne Blair – The Long Forgotten Dream (Sydney Theatre Company)
Best Female Actor in a Supporting Role in a Play	Best Male Actor in a Supporting Role in a Play
Vaishnavi Suryaprakash – Counting & Cracking; Helen Thomson – The Harp in the South: Part One and Part Two; Maude Davey – Melancholia (Malthouse Theatre); Zoe Terakes – A View from the Bridge (Melbourne Theatre Company)	Paul Blackwell – Faith Healer (Belvoir presented by State Theatre Company South Australia); Antonythasan Jesuthasan – Counting & Cracking; Ash Flanders – Blackie Blackie Brown: The Traditional Owner of Death; William McKenna – Harry Potter and the Cursed Child (Parts One and Two)

=== Musicals ===
Best Musical
Barbara and the Camp Dogs – Belvoir in association with Vicki Gordon Music Productions; Handa Opera on Sydney Harbour: West Side Story – Opera Australia; In the Heights – Sydney Opera House and The Arthouse Wyong Presents, produced by Blue Saint Productions in association with Neil Gooding; Roald Dahl's Charlie and the Chocolate Factory – John Frost, Craig Donnell, Warner Bros. Theatre Ventures, Langley Park Productions and Neal Street Productions
Best Direction of a Musical	Best Choreography in a Musical
Francesca Zambello – Handa Opera on Sydney Harbour: West Side Story; Hal Prince – Evita (Opera Australia); Jack O'Brien – Roald Dahl's Charlie and the Chocolate Factory; Luke Joslin – In the Heights	Malik Le Nost & Mitchell Woodcock – Saturday Night Fever (John Frost in association with Robert Stigwood); Amy Campbell – In the Heights; Josh Bergasse – Roald Dahl's Charlie and the Chocolate Factory; Julio Monge – Handa Opera on Sydney Harbour: West Side Story
Best Female Actor in a Musical	Best Male Actor in a Musical
Ursula Yovich – Barbara and the Camp Dogs; Luisa Scrofani – In the Heights; Natalie Abbott – Muriel's Wedding the Musical (Global Creatures); Tina Arena – Evita	Brent Hill – School of Rock The Musical (GWB Entertainment and S&Co in association with Kham Inc by arrangement with The Really Useful Group Limited); Alexander Lewis – Handa Opera on Sydney Harbour: West Side Story; Blake Bowden – The Book of Mormon (Anne Garefino, Scott Rudin, Important Musicals and John Frost); Paul Slade Smith – Roald Dahl's Charlie and the Chocolate Factory
Best Female Actor in a Supporting Role in a Musical	Best Male Actor in a Supporting Role in a Musical
Elaine Crombie – Barbara and the Camp Dogs; Karli Dinardo – Handa Opera on Sydney Harbour: West Side Story; Lucy Maunder – Roald Dahl's Charlie and the Chocolate Factory; Pippa Grandison – Muriel's Wedding the Musical	Tony Sheldon – Roald Dahl's Charlie and the Chocolate Factory; Joel Granger – The Book of Mormon; Mark Hill – Handa Opera on Sydney Harbour: West Side Story; Marty Alix – In the Heights

=== Opera and Classical Music ===
Best Opera	Best Direction of an Opera
Komische Oper Berlin's The Magic Flute – Arts Projects Australia, Adelaide Festival and Perth Festival; Artaserse – Pinchgut Opera; Metamorphosis – Opera Australia; Wozzeck – Opera Australia	Barrie Kosky and Suzanne Andrade – Komische Oper Berlin's The Magic Flute; Lindy Hume – Don Giovanni (Opera Queensland); Sarah Giles – Lorelei (Victorian Opera); William Kentridge – Wozzeck
Best Female Performer in an Opera	Best Male Performer in an Opera
Lise Lindstrom – Salome (Opera Australia); Jessica Pratt – Lucia di Lammermoor (Opera Australia); Lorina Gore – Wozzeck; Vivica Genaux – Artaserse	Michael Honeyman – Wozzeck; Aaron Blake – Komische Oper Berlin's The Magic Flute; David Hansen – Artaserse; Michael Fabiano – Werther (Opera Australia); Simon Lobelson – Metamorphosis (Opera Australia)
Best Female Performer in a Supporting Role in an Opera	Best Male Performer in a Supporting Role in an Opera
Taryn Fiebig – Metamorphosis; Aleksandra Olczyk – Komische Oper Berlin's The Magic Flute; Emma Pearson – Carmen in the Square (State Opera South Australia); Natalie Aroyan – Die Meistersinger von Nürnberg (Opera Australia)	Tom Erik Lie – Komische Oper Berlin's The Magic Flute; Derek Welton – Parsifal (Victorian Opera); John Longmuir – Wozzeck; Nicholas Jones – Die Meistersinger von Nürnberg
Best Symphony Orchestra Concert	Best Chamber and/or Instrumental Ensemble Concert
Tristan und Isolde – West Australia Symphony Orchestra; Daniel Barenboim conducting Staatskapelle Berlin – Sydney Opera House Presents; Mahler Chamber Orchestra – Adelaide Festival; Mahler Six: Simone Young conducts – Sydney Symphony Orchestra & Simone Young	Gabrieli Consort & Players – Purcell's King Arthur – Melbourne Recital Centre & State Opera of South Australia; Sabine Meyer & Alliage Quintett – Musica Viva Australia; Sara Macliver in Concert with Camerata – Camerata – Queensland's Chamber Orchestra; Sretensky Monastery Choir – Adelaide Festival
Best Individual Classical Performance	
Asher Fisch – Tristan und Isolde (West Australian Symphony Orchestra); Diana Doherty – Sydney Symphony Orchestra 2019 Season Opening Gala: Doherty plays Westlake (Sydney Symphony Orchestra); Stuart Skelton – Tristan und Isolde; Vivica Genaux – Vivica Genaux in Concert (Pinchgut Opera)

=== Dance and Physical Theatre ===
Best Ballet	Best Dance Production
Aurum – The Australian Ballet; Carmen – Semperoper Ballet; Dracula – West Australian Ballet; Giselle – Teatro alla Scala and QPAC	The Beginning of Nature – Australian Dance Theatre; Forever & Ever – Sydney Dance Company; Grand Finale – Hofesh Shechter Company and Adelaide Festival; OVERTURE – Arts House and Jo Lloyd
Best Visual or Physical Theatre Production	Best Choreography in a Ballet, Dance or Physical Theatre Production
Out of Chaos... – Gravity & Other Myths; Man With The Iron Neck – Legs On The Wall; Personal – Jodee Mundy Collaborations; PLAYLIST – PYT Fairfield	Antony Hamilton – Forever & Ever; Garry Stewart – The Beginning of Nature; Hofesh Shechter – Grand Finale; Rafael Bonachela – ab [intra] (Sydney Dance Company)
Best Female Dancer in a Ballet, Dance or Physical Theatre Production	Best Male Dancer in a Ballet, Dance or Physical Theatre Production
Tara Jade Samaya – Common Ground (Chunky Move); Ashley McLellan – Dust (Dancenorth Australia and Liminal Spaces, with Brisbane Festival, Sydney Festival, Ten Days on the Island, Merrigong Theatre Company, Monash Academy of Performing Arts and Théâtre National de Chaillot); Carina Roberts – Dracula; Charmene Yap – Cinco (Sydney Dance Company)	Waangenga Blanco – Dark Emu (Bangarra Dance Theatre); Kevin Jackson – Spartacus (The Australian Ballet); Kimball Wong – The Beginning of Nature; Nelson Earl – ab [intra]

=== Contemporary Music ===
Best Australian Contemporary Concert	Best International Contemporary Concert
Back – Tim Minchin and Live Nation Australasia; RPM vs Bad Apples – Darwin Festival and RPM Records and Bad Apples Music; Golden Tour 2019 – Kylie Minogue and Frontier Touring, Roundhouse Entertainment and Mellen Events; Making Gravy 2018 – Paul Kelly and Frontier Touring	American Utopia Tour 2018 – David Byrne and Frontier Touring; Celine Dion – Live 2018 – Celine Dion and Frontier Touring, Concerts West and AEG Presents; Christine and the Queens – Christine and the Queens and Perth Festival; The Killers 2018 – The Killers and Frontier Touring
Best Contemporary Music Festival
MONA FOMA 2019 – Museum of Old and New Art (Mona); CMC Rocks 2019 – Chugg Entertainment and Rob Potts Entertainment Edge; Vivid LIVE 2018 – Vivid LIVE 2018 and Sydney Opera House Presents; WOMADelaide 2019 – WOMADelaide Foundation

=== Other ===
Best Cabaret Performer	Best Comedy Performer
Ali McGregor – Yma Sumac – The Peruvian Songbird (Adelaide Festival Centre's Adelaide Cabaret Festival); Dickie Beau – Re-Member Me (Perth Festival); Libby O'Donovan – Kate Leigh – The Worst Woman in Sydney (Adelaide Festival Centre's Adelaide Cabaret Festival); Michaela Burger – A Migrant's Son (Adelaide Festival Centre's Adelaide Cabaret Festival)	Hannah Gadsby – Douglas (Token); Anne Edmonds – What's Wrong With You? (Token); Cassie Workman – Giantess (Century); Damien Power – Man Puts His Dreams In A Sock (Token); James Acaster – Cold Lasagne Hate Myself 1999 (Melbourne International Comedy Festival); Rhys Nicholson – Nice People Nice Things Nice Situations (Century)
Best Presentation for Children and Young People	Best Regional Touring Production
Robot Song – Arena Theatre Company; A Call to Dance – Performing Lines; Baba Yaga – Windmill Theatre Company & Imaginate; Wolfgang's Magical Musical Circus – Circa	Bennelong – Bangarra Dance Theatre; ab [intra]; Prize Fighter – La Boite Theatre Company; The Beginning of Nature

=== Industry ===
Best New Australian Work
S. Shakthidharan and Eamon Flack – Counting & Cracking; Adriane Daff, Arielle Gray, Chris Isaacs, Tim Watts, Gita Bezard, Ben Collins, Matthew Edgerton, Jeffrey Jay Fowler, Caitri Jones, Michael Maclean, Jo Morris, Kristie Smith, Clare Testoni and Anthony Watts – Lé Nør [the rain] (The Last Great Hunt, Perth Festival, Perth Institute of Contemporary Art and Mandurah Performing Arts Centre); Felix Riebl – Spinifex Gum (Adelaide Festival, Sydney Festival and Monash Academy of Performing Arts); Kate Mulvany – The Harp in the South: Part One and Part Two; Nakkiah Lui – Blackie Blackie Brown: The Traditional Owner of Death; Ursula Yovich and Alana Valentine – Barbara and the Camp Dogs
Best Original Score	Best Music Direction
Ursula Yovich, Alana Valentine and Adam Ventoura – Barbara and the Camp Dogs; Imogen Heap – Harry Potter and the Cursed Child (Parts One and Two); Kate Miller-Heidke & Keir Nuttall – Twelfth Night (Melbourne Theatre Company); William Barton – The Long Forgotten Dream	Erin Helyard – Artaserse; Aaron Wyatt – Speechless (Tura New Music and Perth Festival); Andrea Molino – Wozzeck; Jordan De Souza – Komische Oper Berlin's The Magic Flute
Best Scenic Design	Best Costume Design
Dale Ferguson – Counting & Cracking; Adriane Daff, Arielle Gray, Chris Isaacs, Tim Watts, Anthony Watts, Gita Bezard, Jeffrey Jay Fowler, Caitri Jones, Jo Morris, Kristie Smith and Clare Testoni – Lé Nør [the rain]; Brian Thomson – Handa Opera on Sydney Harbour: West Side Story; Christine Jones – Harry Potter and the Cursed Child (Parts One and Two); Jacob Nash – The Long Forgotten Dream	Gabriela Tylesova – Twelfth Night; Jennifer Irwin – Dark Emu; Katrina Lindsay – Harry Potter and the Cursed Child (Parts One and Two); Renée Mulder – The Harp in the South: Part One and Part Two
Best Lighting Design	Best Sound Design
Neil Austin – Harry Potter and the Cursed Child (Parts One and Two); Damien Cooper – ab [intra]; Mark Howett – The Long Forgotten Dream; Nick Schlieper – Saint Joan	Stefan Gregory – Counting & Cracking; Gareth Fry – Harry Potter and the Cursed Child (Parts One and Two); Nate Edmondson – The Harp in the South: Part One and Part Two; Steve Francis – Dark Emu
Best Special Event	Dark Mofo 2018 – Museum of Old and New Art (Mona)

=== Lifetime Achievement ===
JC Williamson Award	Sue Nattrass Award
Kev Carmody	Liz Jones
