= Helpmann Award for Best Original Score =

Annual Australian musical theatre award

The Helpmann Award for Best Original Score is a musical award presented by Live Performance Australia (LPA) at the annual Helpmann Awards since 2001. In the following list winners are listed first and marked in gold, in boldface, and the nominees are listed below with no highlight.

== Winners and nominees ==
Winners are listed first and marked in a separate colour, in boldface.

| Year | Recipient | Production | Presenter(s) |
|---|---|---|---|
**2001** (1st)
| **2001** (1st) | **Paul Grabowsky and I Wayan Gde Yudane** | **The Theft of Sita** | **Adelaide Festival and Performing Lines** |
| **2001** (1st) | Carl Vine | Mythologia | Sydney Dance Company |
| **2001** (1st) | Iain Grandage | Plainsong | Black Swan |
| **2001** (1st) | Louis Andriessen | Writing to Vermeer | Adelaide Festival |
**2002** (2nd)
| **2002** (2nd) | **Iain Grandage** | **Cloudstreet** | **Company B Belvoir and Black Swan Theatre** |
| **2002** (2nd) | David Chisholm | The Shrinking Ledge | Wecreate |
| **2002** (2nd) | Ian McDonald | The Tempest | Melbourne Theatre Company in association with Melbourne Festival |
| **2002** (2nd) | Richard Mills | Batavia | Opera Australia in association with Melbourne Festival |
**2003** (3rd)
| **2003** (3rd) | **Steve Francis** | **Walkabout** | **Bangarra Dance Theatre** |
| **2003** (3rd) | Paul Grabowsky and Joanna Murray-Smith | Love in the Age of Therapy | OZOpera, Victorian Arts Centre Trust, Melbourne Festival & Sydney Festival |
| **2003** (3rd) | Andree Greenwell | Volpone | Sydney Theatre Company |
| **2003** (3rd) | Ian McDonald | Great Expectations | Melbourne Theatre Company |
**2004** (4th)
| **2004** (4th) | **Elena Kats-Chernin** | **Wild Swans** | **The Australian Ballet** |
| **2004** (4th) | Gerry Brophy & Ensemble | Phobia | Chamber Made Opera |
| **2004** (4th) | David Page | Unaipon (Clan Act I) | Bangarra Dance Theatre |
| **2004** (4th) | Tim Rice, Elton John, Lebo M, Hans Zimmer, Julie Taymor, Mark Mancina & Jay Rifkin | The Lion King | Disney Theatrical Productions (Aust) |
**2005** (5th)
| **2005** (5th) | **Tom Waits** | **The Black Rider** | **Sydney Festival in association with International Concert Attractions and Andrew Kay & Associates** |
| **2005** (5th) | Mel Brooks | The Producers | SEL & GFO and Bialystock & Bloom New York Co. |
| **2005** (5th) | Brett Collery | The Red Tree | Queensland Performing Arts Centre's Out of the Box Festival of Early Childhood Learning |
| **2005** (5th) | John Haddock | Madeline Lee | Opera Australia |
**2006** (6th)
| **2006** (6th) | **Casey Bennetto** | **Keating! A country soul opera** | **Catherine Woodfield** |
| **2006** (6th) | Iain Grandage | The Drover's Wives | Steamworks Arts Production in association with Black Swan Theatre Company |
| **2006** (6th) | Iain Grandage | The Odyssey | Malthouse Theatre, Melbourne International Arts Festival, Black Swan Theatre Company and the Perth International Arts Festival |
| **2006** (6th) | Carl Polke | On the Case | Legs on the Wall |
**2007** (7th)
| **2007** (7th) | **Paul Keelan & Gary Young** | **Sideshow Alley** | **McPherson Ink Pty Ltd** |
| **2007** (7th) | James Brett | Walking with Dinosaurs - the Live Experience | WW T-Rex Pty Ltd |
| **2007** (7th) | Alan John | Mother Courage & Her Children | Sydney Theatre Company |
| **2007** (7th) | Richard Mills | The Love of the Nightingale | West Australian Opera |
**2008** (8th)
| **2008** (8th) | **Barrie Kosky** | **The Tell-Tale Heart** | **Malthouse Theatre and Melbourne International Arts Festival** |
| **2008** (8th) | Richard Mills | Songlines for the Heart's Desire | Musica Viva |
| **2008** (8th) | Andree Greenwell | Venus & Adonis | Malthouse Theatre and Bell Shakespeare |
| **2008** (8th) | Ben Frost | Mortal Engine | Chunky Move presented by Sydney Festival |
**2009** (9th)
| **2009** (9th) | **David Page** | **Mathinna** | **Bangarra Dance Theatre** |
| **2009** (9th) | Liza Lim | The Navigator | Brisbane Festival and Melbourne International Arts Festival |
| **2009** (9th) | The Necks – Chris Abrahams, Tony Buck & Lloyd Swanton | FOOD COURT | Melbourne International Arts Festival and Back to Back Theatre |
| **2009** (9th) | Stephen Schwartz | Wicked | Marc Platt, David Stone, Universal Pictures, The Araca Group, Jon B. Platt and John Frost |
**2010** (10th)
| **2010** (10th) | **iOTA with Tina Harris, Joe Accaria, Chris Ball and Martin Hailey** | **Smoke & Mirrors** | **Sydney Festival** |
| **2010** (10th) | Brett Dean | Bliss | Opera Australia |
| **2010** (10th) | Jeff Marx and Robert Lopez | Avenue Q | Arts Asia Pacific and Power Arts |
| **2010** (10th) | Taikoz | Pericles | Bell Shakespeare in association with Taikoz |
**2011** (11th)
| **2011** (11th) | **Alan John** | **The Diary of a Madman** | **Belvoir** |
| **2011** (11th) | David Milroy | Waltzing the Wilarra | Yirra Yaakin Theatre Company |
| **2011** (11th) | Regurgitator | Akira | Sydney Opera House |
| **2011** (11th) | John Rodgers | Where the Heart Is | Expressions Dance Company and QPAC |
**2012** (12th)
| **2012** (12th) | **David Page and Steve Francis** | **Belong** | **Bangarra Dance Theatre** |
| **2012** (12th) | Clint Bracknell, David Salvaire and Dylan Hooper | The Red Tree | Barking Gecko Theatre Company and Perth International Arts Festival |
| **2012** (12th) | Jake Heggie | Moby-Dick | State Opera of South Australia |
| **2012** (12th) | Alan John | The White Guard | Sydney Theatre Company |
**2013** (13th)
| **2013** (13th) | **Iain Grandage** | **The Secret River** | **Sydney Theatre Company** |
| **2013** (13th) | Marius de Vries (original music), Michael Mitnick and Richard Thomas (additional lyrics), featuring songs and original compositions by 3D, Guy Garvey, Sarah McLachlan, Justice and The Avalanches | King Kong | Global Creatures |
| **2013** (13th) | David Page | TERRAIN | Bangarra Dance Theatre |
| **2013** (13th) | Gordon Kerry and Louis Nowra | Midnight Son | Victorian Opera |
**2014** (14th)
| **2014** (14th) | **Iain Grandage** | **When Time Stops** | **Expressions Dance Company and Queensland Performing Arts Centre in association with Brisbane Festival** |
| **2014** (14th) | David Chisholm | The Bloody Chamber | Malthouse Theatre |
| **2014** (14th) | David Page & Paul Mac | Blak | Bangarra Dance Theatre |
| **2014** (14th) | Nick Wales | AM I | Shaun Parker & Company in association with the Confederation of Australian International Arts Festivals, Sydney Festival, Adelaide Festival and Melbourne Festival |
| **2014** (14th) | Jethro Woodward | Pinocchio | Windmill Theatre & State Theatre Company of South Australia |
**2015** (15th)
| **2015** (15th) | **Kate Miller-Heidke and Iain Grandage** | **The Rabbits** | **Opera Australia and Barking Gecko Theatre Company in association with West Australian Opera** |
| **2015** (15th) | Cameron Goodall and Quentin Grant | Little Bird | State Theatre Company of South Australia in association with Adelaide Festival Centre |
| **2015** (15th) | Mikelangelo and Pip Branson performed by The Blacksea Gentlemen | Masquarade | Griffin Theatre Company and State Theatre Company of South Australia |
| **2015** (15th) | Tim Rogers | What Rhymes With Cars and Girls | Melbourne Theatre Company |
**2016** (16th)
| **2016** (16th) | **Tim Minchin** | **Matilda the Musical** | **The Royal Shakespeare Company and Louise Withers, Michael Coppel and Michael Watt with Chokey Productions, Just for Laughs Theatricals, Glass Half Full Productions, Paula Marie Black, Greenleaf Productions and Michael Lynch** |
| **2016** (16th) | Tim Finn | Ladies in Black | Queensland Theatre Company |
| **2016** (16th) | Eddie Perfect | Songs From The Middle | Adelaide Festival Centre's Adelaide Cabaret Festival |
| **2016** (16th) | David Page | Ochres | Bangarra Dance Theatre |
**2017** (17th)
| **2017** (17th) | **Iain Grandage and Rahayu Supanggah** | **Satan Jawa** | **Arts Centre Melbourne and Melbourne Symphony Orchestra** |
| **2017** (17th) | Paul Kelly & Camille O'Sullivan with Feargal Murray | Ancient Rain | Far and Away Productions in association with Brink Productions, co-commissioned by Melbourne Festival and Adelaide Cabaret Festival |
| **2017** (17th) | Trey Parker, Matt Stone and Robert Lopez | The Book of Mormon | Anne Garefino, Scott Rudin, Important Musicals, John Frost, Roger Berlind, Scott M. Delman, Jean Doumanian, Roy Furman, Stephanie P. McClelland, Kevin Morris, Jon B. Platt, Sonia Friedman Productions |
| **2017** (17th) | Rully Shabara and Wukir Suryadi | Attractor | Dancenorth and Lucy Guerin Inc with Arts Centre Melbourne, WOMADelaide and Brisbane Festival |
**2018** (18th)
| **2018** (18th) | **Kate Miller-Heidke and Keir Nuttall** | **Muriel's Wedding The Musical** | **Sydney Theatre Company and Global Creatures** |
| **2018** (18th) | Sam Cromack | Laser Beak Man | Brisbane Festival, La Boite Theatre Company and Dead Puppet Society in association with PowerArts |
| **2018** (18th) | Steve Francis | Bennelong | Bangarra Dance Theatre |
| **2018** (18th) | Max Richter | Woolf Works | The Royal Ballet and QPAC |
**2019** (19th)
| **2019** (19th) | **Ursula Yovich, Alana Valentine and Adam Ventoura** | **Barbara and the Camp Dogs** | **Belvoir in association with Vicki Gordon Music Productions Pty Ltd** |
| **2019** (19th) | William Barton | The Long Forgotten Dream | Sydney Theatre Company |
| **2019** (19th) | Imogen Heap | Harry Potter and the Cursed Child (Parts One and Two) | Sonia Friedman Productions, Colin Callender and Harry Potter Theatrical Productions, and Australian executive producer, Michael Cassel |
| **2019** (19th) | Kate Miller-Heidke and Keir Nuttall | Twelfth Night | Melbourne Theatre Company |

== See also ==
- Helpmann Awards
