= 18th Helpmann Awards =

2018 Australian live performance awards

- Date: 15–16 July 2018
- Location: Capitol Theatre, Sydney

Television/radio coverage
- Network: ABC

The 18th Annual Helpmann Awards for live performance in Australia was held across two nights; the Curtain Raiser Ceremony on 15 July 2018 at the Sydney Town Hall and the Awards Ceremony on 16 July 2018 at the Capitol Theatre, Sydney. Nominations were announced on 18 June 2018.

Major recipients included dance work Bennelong (six awards including Best New Australian Work and Best Dance Production), musicals Beautiful (five awards including Best Musical) and Muriel's Wedding (five awards including Best Original Score), opera Hamlet (four awards including Best Opera), and play The Children (three awards including Best Play).

== Recipients and nominations ==
Nominees and winners of the 2018 Helpmann Awards were:

=== Theatre ===
Best Play	Best Direction of a Play
The Children – Melbourne Theatre Company and Sydney Theatre Company; Black is the New White – Sydney Theatre Company; Laser Beak Man – Brisbane Festival, La Boite Theatre Company and Dead Puppet Society; The Irresistible – Side Pony Productions & The Last Great Hunt; The Real and Imagined History of the Elephant Man – Malthouse Theatre; The Resistible Rise of Arturo Ui – Sydney Theatre Company	Sarah Goodes – The Children; Matthew Lutton – The Real and Imagined History of the Elephant Man; Kip Williams – Cloud Nine (Sydney Theatre Company); Kip Williams – The Resistible Rise of Arturo Ui
Best Female Actor in a Play	Best Male Actor in a Play
Pamela Rabe – The Children; Miranda Daughtry – A Doll's House (State Theatre Company South Australia); Helen Morse – Memorial (Brink Productions and Adelaide Festival); Sarah Peirse – The Children	Hugo Weaving – The Resistible Rise of Arturo Ui; John Bell – The Father (Sydney Theatre Company and Melbourne Theatre Company); Daniel Monks – The Real and Imagined History of the Elephant Man; Toby Schmitz – Thyestes (Belvoir, originally created by The Hayloft Project)
Best Female Actor in a Supporting Role in a Play	Best Male Actor in a Supporting Role in a Play
Anita Hegh – The Resistible Rise of Arturo Ui; Kate Box – Top Girls (Sydney Theatre Company); Elaine Crombie – An Octoroon (Queensland Theatre and Brisbane Festival); Jane Montgomery-Griffiths – Macbeth (Melbourne Theatre Company)	Mitchell Butel – Mr Burns, A Post-Electric Play (Belvoir and State Theatre Company South Australia); Peter Carroll – The Resistible Rise of Arturo Ui; Harry Greenwood – Cloud Nine; Colin Moody – The Resistible Rise of Arturo Ui

=== Musicals ===
Best Musical
Beautiful: The Carole King Musical – Michael Cassel in association with Paul Blake & Sony/ATV Music Publishing & Mike Bosner; Dream Lover – John Frost and Gilbert Theatrical; Mamma Mia! The Musical – Michael Coppel, Louise Withers & Linda Bewick; Muriel's Wedding The Musical – Sydney Theatre Company and Global Creatures
Best Direction of a Musical	Best Choreography in a Musical
Marc Bruni – Beautiful: The Carole King Musical; Dean Bryant – Assassins (Hayes Theatre); Simon Phillips – Dream Lover; Simon Phillips – Muriel's Wedding The Musical	Andrew Hallsworth – Muriel's Wedding The Musical; Karen Bruce – The Bodyguard (John Frost, Michael Harrison and David Ian); Josh Prince – Beautiful: The Carole King Musical; Tom Hodgson – Mamma Mia! The Musical
Best Female Actor in a Musical	Best Male Actor in a Musical
Esther Hannaford – Beautiful: The Carole King Musical; Maggie McKenna – Muriel's Wedding The Musical; Natalie O'Donnell – Mamma Mia! The Musical; Marina Prior – Dream Lover	David Campbell – Dream Lover; David Campbell – Assassins; Euan Doidge – Priscilla Queen of the Desert – The Musical (Michael Cassel Group and Nullarbor Productions in association with MGM on Stage); David Harris – Priscilla Queen of the Desert – The Musical; Ian Stenlake – Mamma Mia! The Musical
Best Female Actor in a Supporting Role in a Musical	Best Male Actor in a Supporting Role in a Musical
Amy Lehpamer – Beautiful: The Carole King Musical; Madeleine Jones – Muriel's Wedding The Musical; Jemma Rix – The Wizard of Oz (John Frost and Suzanne Jones); Christie Whelan Browne – Muriel's Wedding The Musical	Mat Verevis – Beautiful: The Carole King Musical; Martin Crewes – Dream Lover; Bobby Fox – Assassins; Robert Grubb – Priscilla Queen of the Desert – The Musical

=== Opera and Classical Music ===
Best Opera	Best Direction of an Opera
Hamlet (Dean) – Glyndebourne Festival, Adelaide Festival, State Opera of South Australia and Adelaide Symphony Orchestra; Black Rider: The Casting of the Magic Bullets – Victorian Opera and Malthouse Theatre in association with Melbourne Festival; Cunning Little Vixen – Victorian Opera; The Nose – Opera Australia	Neil Armfield – Hamlet; Barrie Kosky – The Nose; Matthew Lutton – Black Rider: The Casting of the Magic Bullets; Stuart Maunder – Cunning Little Vixen
Best Female Performer in an Opera	Best Male Performer in an Opera
Nicole Car – La Traviata (Opera Australia); Taryn Fiebig – Triple Bill (Pinchgut Opera); Dimity Shepherd – Black Rider: The Casting of the Magic Bullets; Helen Sherman – Coronation of Poppea (Pinchgut Opera)	Allan Clayton – Hamlet; Kanen Breen – Black Rider: The Casting of the Magic Bullets; Ferruccio Furlanetto – Don Quichotte (Opera Australia); Barry Ryan – Cunning Little Vixen
Best Female Performer in a Supporting Role in an Opera	Best Male Performer in a Supporting Role in an Opera
Lorina Gore – Hamlet; Natalie Christie Peluso – Coronation of Poppea; Antoinette Halloran – Cunning Little Vixen; Meow Meow – Black Rider: The Casting of the Magic Bullets	Kanen Breen – Coronation of Poppea; Warwick Fyfe – Don Quichotte; Jud Arthur – Hamlet; Kim Begley – Hamlet
Best Symphony Orchestra Concert	Best Chamber and/or Instrumental Ensemble Concert
Sydney Symphony Orchestra – Bluebeard’s Castle: With Bach and Brahms; Sydney Symphony Orchestra – Beethoven and Bruckner: Simone Young Conducts; Musica Viva Australia – Orchestra of the Age of Enlightenment with Rachel Podger; West Australian Symphony Orchestra – Wagner and Beyond: Inspiring Wagner	Perth Festival – Jordi Savall with Hesperion XXI & Tembembe Ensemble Continuo; Rundfunkchor Berlin and Adelaide Festival – human requiem; Pieter Wispelwey & Caroline Almonte and Melbourne Recital Centre – Pieter Wispelwey: Beethoven, Bach, Brahms with Caroline Almonte; Musica Viva Australia – Takács Quartet
Best Individual Classical Performance	
Jonas Kaufmann – Parsifal; Kwangchul Youn – Parsifal; Pieter Wispelwey – Pieter Wispelwey plays the Bach Cello Suites; Emanuel Ax – A Mozart Celebration: Emanuel Ax with The Sydney Symphony Orchestra

=== Dance and Physical Theatre ===
Best Ballet	Best Dance Production
Alice's Adventure's in Wonderland – The Australian Ballet; The Great Gatsby – West Australian Ballet; The Winter's Tale – The Royal Ballet & QPAC; Woolf Works – The Royal Ballet & QPAC	Bennelong – Bangarra Dance Theatre; Intimate Space – Restless Dance Theatre in association with Bleach* Festival and Festival 2018; Mozart Airborne – Expressions Dance Company, Opera Queensland and QPAC; One Flat Thing, Reproduced – Strut Dance
Best Visual or Physical Theatre Production	Best Choreography in a Ballet, Dance or Physical Theatre Production
Tide – BLEACH* Festival & The Farm; Carrion – Justin Shoulder; Limbo Unhinged – Strut & Fret Production House; White Spirit – Zaman Production & Galerie Itinerrance in collaboration with the Musée Du Quai Branly – Jacques Chirac and Perth Festival	Stephen Page – Bennelong; Phillip Adams – Ever (Phillip Adams BalletLab in association with Melbourne Festival); Wayne McGregor – Woolf Works; Christopher Wheeldon – Alice's Adventures in Wonderland
Best Female Dancer in a Ballet, Dance or Physical Theatre Production	Best Male Dancer in a Ballet, Dance or Physical Theatre Production
Ako Kondo – Alice's Adventures in Wonderland; Elise May – Behind Closed Doors (Expressions Dance Company and QPAC); Melissa Boniface – The Great Gatsby; Vivinne Wong – Infra (The Australian Ballet)	Beau Dean Riley Smith – Bennelong; Joshua Thomson – Tide; Kevin Jackson – Alice's Adventures in Wonderland; Nelson Earl – Ocho (Sydney Dance Company)

=== Contemporary Music ===
Best Australian Contemporary Concert	Best International Contemporary Concert
Gotye Presents a Tribute to Jean-Jacques Perrey – Gotye, Sydney Festival & Mona Foma; Symphonica with Armand van Helden (with Melbourne Symphony Orchestra, Frontier Touring & Arts Centre Melbourne); Gang of Youths – Australia 2017 (with Live Nation); Midnight Oil – The Great Circle World Tour 2017 (with Frontier Touring)	Paul McCartney – One On One World Tour 2017 – Paul McCartney, Frontier Touring, Mpl & Marshall Arts; Cécile McLorin Salvant and Adelaide Festival; Ed Sheeran World Tour 2018 (with Frontier Touring); Underworld (with Sydney Opera House Presents)
Best Contemporary Music Festival
Mona Foma – Museum Of Old And New Art (MONA); CMC Rocks QLD 2018 (Chugg Entertainment & Rob Potts Entertainment Edge; St. Jerome’s Laneway Festival 2018 (Lunatic Entertainment & Laneway Presents); WOMADelaide (Womadelaide Foundation)

=== Other ===
Best Cabaret Performer	Best Comedy Performer
Taylor Mac – A 24-Decade History of Popular Music (Melbourne International Arts Festival); Briefs Ensemble – Briefs: Close Encounters (Briefs Factory); Reuben Kaye – Journey to the Centre of Attention (Adelaide Cabaret Festival); Queenie van de Zandt – Blue: The Songs of Joni Mitchell (Neil Gooding Productions & Queenie van de Zandt)	Celia Pacquola – All Talk (Token Events); Urzila Carlson – Studies Have Shown (Live Nation); Zoe Coombs Marr – Bossy Bottom (Token Events); Anne Edmonds – Helen Bidou – Enter the Spinnaker Lounge (Token Events); Colin Lane & Frank Woodley – Lano & Woodley – Fly (Token Events); Julia Morris – Lift and Separate Golden Jubilee (Live Nation); Rhys Nicholson – Seminal (Century)
Best Presentation for Children	Best Regional Touring Production
Emil and the Detectives – Slingsby; Junk – Flying Fruit Fly Circus, Sydney Opera House and Arts Centre Melbourne; Tetris – DreamBIG Children’s Festival 2017 at Adelaide Festival Centre; The Secret Life of Suitcases – Arts Centre Melbourne, Ailie Cohen Puppet Maker and the Unicorn Theatre London	Our Land People Stories – Bangarra Dance Theatre; Hello, Goodbye and Happy Birthday – Roslyn Oades and Performing Lines; Oddysea – Sensorium Theatre and Performing Lines WA; Saltbush – Insite Arts, Compagnia TPO and Performing Lines/Blak Lines

=== Industry ===
Best New Australian Work	Best Special Event
Stephen Page – Bennelong; Brett Dean and Matthew Jocelyn – Hamlet; Colin Lane & Frank Woodley – Lano & Woodley – Fly; Nakkiah Lui – Black is the New White; Nicholas Paine, David Morton, Tim Sharp and Sam Cromack – Laser Beak Man; PJ Hogan, Kate Miller-Heidke & Keir Nuttall – Muriel’s Wedding The Musical	Taylor Mac: A 24 Decade History Of Popular Music
Best Original Score	Best Music Direction
Kate Miller-Heidke & Keir Nuttall – Muriel's Wedding The Musical; Sam Cromack – Laser Beak Man; Steve Francis – Bennelong; Max Richter – Woolf Works	Isaac Hayward – Muriel's Wedding The Musical; Phoebe Briggs – Black Rider: The Casting of the Magic Bullets; Nicolette Fraillon – Alice's Adventures in Wonderland; Brian Ritchie – The Spirit of Churaki (Bleach* Festival and Banaam)
Best Scenic Design	Best Costume Design
Jacob Nash – Bennelong; Bunny Christie – The Curious Incident of the Dog in the Night-Time (National Theatre, Melbourne Theatre Company and Arts Centre Melbourne); Bob Crowley – Alice's Adventures in Wonderland; David Morton, Jonathon Oxlade and Justin Harrison – Laser Beak Man	Gabriela Tylesova – Muriel's Wedding The Musical; Zoe Atkinson – Black Rider: The Casting of the Magic Bullets; Jennifer Irwin – Bennelong; Jonathon Oxlade – Mr Burns, A Post-Electric Play
Best Lighting Design	Best Sound Design
Nick Schlieper – Bennelong; Geoff Cobham – Emil and the Detectives; Paule Constable – The Curious Incident of the Dog in the Night-Time; Damien Cooper – You Animal, You (Force Majeure, Sydney Festival and Carriageworks)	Michael Waters – Muriel’s Wedding The Musical; Ian Dickinson for Autograph – The Curious Incident of the Dog in the Night-Time; Byron J. Scullin, Tom Supple and Hannah Fox – Siren Song (Byron J. Scullin & Supple Fox and Perth Festival); Michael Waters – Dream Lover

=== Lifetime Achievement ===
JC Williamson Award	Sue Nattrass Award
Robyn Archer; Reg Livermore; Robyn Nevin; Archie Roach; Jim Sharman	Carrillo Gantner; Susan Provan; Ian McRae; Rhoda Roberts; Frank van Straten
