= Helpmann Award for Best Male Actor in a Play =

Annual Australian theatre award

- Awarded for: Best Male Actor in a Play
- Location: Australia
- Presented by: Live Performance Australia
- Currently held by: Prakash Belawadi for Counting and Cracking (2019)
- Website: HelpmannAwards.com.au

The Helpmann Award for Best Male Actor in a Play is an award presented by Live Performance Australia (LPA) (the trade name for the Australian Entertainment Industry Association (AEIA)), an employers' organisation which serves as the peak body in the live entertainment and performing arts industries in Australia. The accolade is handed out at the annual Helpmann Awards, which celebrates achievements in musical theatre, contemporary music, comedy, opera, classical music, theatre, dance and physical theatre. This is a list of winners and nominations for the Helpmann Award for Best Male Actor in a Play.

== Winners and nominees ==
Winners are listed first and marked in a separate colour.

Year	Actor	Production	Character(s)
2001 (1st)
2001 (1st)	John Gaden	The Unexpected Man	The Man
2001 (1st)	Bille Brown	Troilus and Cressida	Paris
2001 (1st)	Kim Gyngell	'Art'	Yvan
2001 (1st)	Geoffrey Rush	The Small Poppies	Clint
2002 (2nd)
2002 (2nd)	John Bell	Richard III	Richard III
2002 (2nd)	Peter Carroll	The Christian Brothers	Unnamed teacher^{[A]}
2002 (2nd)	Willem Dafoe	The Hairy Ape	Yank
2002 (2nd)	John Stanton	The Tempest	Prospero
2003 (3rd)
2003 (3rd)	Colin Friels	Copenhagen	Werner Heisenberg
2003 (3rd)	Marcus Graham	The Blue Room	Various characters^{[B]}
2003 (3rd)	Benjamin Winspear	Great Expectations	Pip
2003 (3rd)	Max Cullen	Waiting for Godot	Estragon (Gogo)
2004 (4th)
2004 (4th)	Darren Gilshenan	The Servant of Two Masters	Truffaldino
2004 (4th)	David Gulpilil	Gulpilil	Himself^{[C]}
2004 (4th)	Frank Gallacher	Frozen	Ralph
2004 (4th)	Paul Blackwell	Night Letters	Robert
2005 (5th)
2005 (5th)	Robert Menzies	Journal of the Plague Year	Daniel Defoe
2005 (5th)	Richard Piper	The Daylight Atheist	Dan Morphett
2005 (5th)	Aaron Pedersen	Eating Ice Cream With Eyes Closed	Macca
2005 (5th)	William Zappa	Death of a Salesman	Willy Loman
2006 (6th)
2006 (6th)	Greg Stone	Stuff Happens	George W. Bush
2006 (6th)	Robert Menzies	Julius Caesar	Marcus Brutus
2006 (6th)	Stephen Dillane	Macbeth	Various characters^{[D]}
2006 (6th)	Marcus Graham	Oedipus the King	Oedipus
2007 (7th)
2007 (7th)	Jefferson Mays	I Am My Own Wife	Charlotte von Mahlsdorf^{[E]}
2007 (7th)	Cameron Goodall	Hamlet	Hamlet
2007 (7th)	John Gaden	The Lost Echo	Tiresias
2007 (7th)	Peter Carroll	The Season At Sarsaparilla	Girlie Pogson
2008 (8th)
2008 (8th)	Richard Roxburgh	Toy Symphony	Roland Henning
2008 (8th)	Geoffrey Rush	Exit the King	King Berenger
2008 (8th)	Marton Csokas	Who's Afraid of Virginia Woolf?	George
2008 (8th)	Martin Niedermair	The Tell-Tale Heart	Unnamed^{[F]}
2009 (9th)
2009 (9th)	Ben Winspear	Baghdad Wedding	Salim
2009 (9th)	Colin Moody	Antigone	Creon
2009 (9th)	Greg Stone	Blackbird	Ray
2009 (9th)	Robert Menzies	War of the Roses	Henry IV
2010 (10th)
2010 (10th)	Ewen Leslie	Richard III	King Richard III
2010 (10th)	Paul Blackwell	The Hypochondriac	Argan
2010 (10th)	Toby Schmitz	Ruben Guthrie	Ruben Guthrie
2010 (10th)	Robert Menzies	The End	Dying Man^{[G]}
2011 (11th)
2011 (11th)	Geoffrey Rush	The Diary of a Madman	Poprishchin
2011 (11th)	Richard Roxburgh	Uncle Vanya	Vanya
2011 (11th)	Toby Schmitz	Much Ado About Nothing	Benedick
2011 (11th)	Lucas Stibbard	Boy Girl Wall	Thomas, various^{[H]}
2012 (12th)
2012 (12th)	Paul Capsis	Angela's Kitchen	Various
2012 (12th)	Bille Brown	The Histrionic	Bruscon
2012 (12th)	Jack Charles	Jack Charles v The Crown	Himself
2012 (12th)	Colin Friels	Red	Mark Rothko
2013 (13th)
2013 (13th)	Colin Friels	Death of a Salesman	Bruscon
2013 (13th)	John Bell	Henry 4	Falstaff
2013 (13th)	Colin Moody	Forget Me Not	Gerry
2013 (13th)	Nathaniel Dean	The Secret River	William Thornhill
2014 (14th)
2014 (14th)	Richard Roxburgh	Waiting for Godot	Estragon
2014 (14th)	Paul Blackwell	Vere (Faith)	Vere
2014 (14th)	Luke Carroll	The Cake Man	Sweet William
2014 (14th)	Denis O'Hare	An Iliad	The Poet
2015 (15th)
2015 (15th)	Hugo Weaving	Endgame	Hamm
2015 (15th)	Peter Carroll	Oedipus Rex	Oedipus
2015 (15th)	Hunter Page-Lochard	Brothers Wreck	Ruben
2015 (15th)	Steve Rodgers	Eight Gigabytes of Hardcore Pornography	
2016 (16th)
2016 (16th)	Mark Leonard Winter	Birdland	Paul
2016 (16th)	Pacharo Mzembe	Prize Fighter	Isa
2016 (16th)	Richard Roxburgh	The Present	Mikhail Platonov
2016 (16th)	Dan Spielman	The Blind Giant is Dancing	Allen Fitzgerald
2017 (17th)
2017 (17th)	Mark Coles Smith	The Drover's Wife	Yadaka
2017 (17th)	Jason Chong	Chimerica	Zhang Lin
2017 (17th)	Colin Friels	Faith Healer	Francis Hardy
2017 (17th)	Jason Klarwein	Once in Royal David's City	Will Drummond
2018 (18th)
2018 (18th)	Hugo Weaving	The Resistible Rise of Arturo Ui	Arturo Ui
2018 (18th)	Toby Schmitz	Thyestes	Atreus
2018 (18th)	John Bell AO	The Father	André
2018 (18th)	Daniel Monks	The Real and Imagined History of the Elephant Man	Joseph Merrick
2019 (19th)
2019 (19th)	Prakash Belawadi	Counting and Cracking	Apah
2019 (19th)	Wayne Blair	The Long Forgotten Dream	Jeremiah Tucker
2019 (19th)	Kelton Pell	Summer of the Seventeenth Doll	Roo
2019 (19th)	Amer Hlehel	TAHA	Taha Muhammad Ali

== See also ==
- Helpmann Awards

== Notes ==
A: The character in The Christian Brothers is known as the "unnamed elderly Christian Brothers’ teacher"
B: In The Blue Room Marcus Graham portrayed the male characters: Fred, Anton, Charles, Robert, Malcolm.
C: Gulpilil is an autobiographical stage production, where David Gulpilil played himself.
D: Macbeth was performed by Stephen Dillane as a one man show, who portrayed over thirty of the characters in the play.
E: Jefferson Mays portrayed an additional forty characters in I Am My Own Wife.
F: The character in The Tell-Tale Heart does not have a name.
G: Robert Menzies' character in The End doesn't have a name and is known simply as Dying Man.
H: Lucas Stibbard plays the lead roles of Thomas and Alethea, and various other characters in Boy Girl Wall.
