= 15th Helpmann Awards =

2015 Australian live performance awards

- Date: 27 July 2015
- Location: Capitol Theatre, Sydney
- Hosted by: Todd McKenney

Television/radio coverage
- Network: Foxtel Arts

The 15th Annual Helpmann Awards for live performance in Australia were held on 27 July 2015 at the Capitol Theatre in Sydney. Best Musical and Best Play were both awarded to revival productions, of Les Misérables and The Glass Menagarie respectively. Opera for young audiences The Rabbits was named Best New Australian Work and Best Original Score. Singer-songwriter Paul Kelly received the JC Williamson Award for lifetime achievement.

== Winners and nominees ==
In the following tables, winners are listed first and highlighted in boldface. The nominees are those which are listed below the winner and not in boldface.

=== Theatre ===
Best Play	Best Direction of a Play
**The Glass Menagerie – Belvoir**; Calpurnia Descending – Malthouse Theatre and Sydney Theatre Company; Endgame – Sydney Theatre Company; Suddenly Last Summer – Sydney Theatre Company	**Kip Williams – Suddenly Last Summer**; Sarah Goodes – Switzerland (Sydney Theatre Company); Andrew Upton – Endgame (Sydney Theatre Company); Clare Watson – What Rhymes with Cars and Girls (Melbourne Theatre Company)
Best Female Actor in a Play	Best Male Actor in a Play
**Pamela Rabe – The Glass Menagerie**; Julie Forsyth – Night on Bald Mountain (Malthouse Theatre); Robyn Nevin – Suddenly Last Summer; Sarah Peirse – Switzerland	**Hugo Weaving – Endgame (Sydney Theatre Company)**; Hunter Page-Lochard – Brothers Wreck (Belvoir); Peter Carroll – Oedipus Rex (Belvoir); Steve Rodgers – Eight Gigabytes of Hardcore Porn (Griffin Theatre Company and Perth Theatre Company)
Best Female Actor in a Supporting Role in a Play	Best Male Actor in a Supporting Role in a Play
**Helen Thomson – After Dinner (Sydney Theatre Company)**; Julie Forsyth – Endgame (Melbourne Theatre Company); Sarah Peirse – Endgame (Sydney Theatre Company); Pamela Rabe – Beckett Tryptych - Footfalls (State Theatre Company of South Australia in association with Adelaide Festival)	**John Bell – As You Like It (Bell Shakespeare)**; Glenn Hazeldine – After Dinner; Bruce Spence – Endgame (Sydney Theatre Company); Lasarus Ratuere – Kill the Messenger (Belvoir)

=== Musicals ===
Best Musical
**Les Misérables – Cameron Mackintosh Australia**; Anything Goes – Opera Australia and John Frost; Dirty Dancing - The Classic Love Story on Stage – John Frost^{[A]}; Once – John Frost^{[B]}
Best Direction of a Musical	Best Choreography in a Musical
**John Tiffany – Once**; Dean Bryant – Anything Goes; Laurence Connor and James Powell – Les Misérables; Stuart Maunder AM – Into the Woods (Victorian Opera)	**Andrew Hallsworth – Anything Goes**; Kate Champion and Michelle Lynch – Dirty Dancing - The Classic Love Story on Stage; Michael Ashcroft and Geoffrey Garratt – Les Misérables; Steven Hoggett – Once
Best Female Actor in a Musical	Best Male Actor in a Musical
**Caroline O'Connor – Anything Goes**; Helen Dallimore – Blood Brothers (Enda Markey Presents); Madeline Jones – Once; Patrice Tipoki – Les Misérables	**Simon Gleeson – Les Misérables**; Hayden Tee – Les Misérables; Todd McKenney – Anything Goes; Todd McKenney – La Cage aux Folles (The Production Company)
Best Female Actor in a Supporting Role in a Musical	Best Male Actor in a Supporting Role in a Musical
**Kerrie Anne Greenland – Les Misérables**; Amy Lehpamer – Once; Claire Lyon – Anything Goes; Lucy Maunder – Into the Woods	**Alex Rathgeber – Anything Goes**; Trevor Ashley – Les Misérables; Colin Dean – Once; Chris Durling – Les Misérables; Brent Hill – Once; Eddie Muliaumaseali'i – Show Boat (The Production Company)

=== Opera and Classical Music ===
Best Opera	Best Direction of an Opera
**Faramondo – Brisbane Baroque in association with QPAC**; Faust – Opera Australia in association with The Opera Conference; Madama Butterfly – English National Opera, Metropolitan Opera and Lithuanian National Opera in association with West Australian Opera and Perth International Arts Festival; Philip Glass Trilogy – State Opera of South Australia	**Paul Curran – Faramondo**; David McVicar – Don Giovanni (Opera Australia); David McVicar – Faust; Leigh Warren – Philip Glass Trilogy
Best Female Performer in an Opera	Best Male Performer in an Opera
**Jennifer Rivera – Faramondo**; Nicole Car – Faust; Caitlin Hulcup – Iphigénie en Tauride (Pinchgut Opera); Latonia Moore – Aida - Handa Opera on Sydney Harbour (Opera Australia)	**Michael Fabiano – Faust**; Adam Diegel – Madama Butterfly; Christopher Purves – The Perfect American (Brisbane Festival and Opera Queensland in association with QPAC and Griffith University); Claudio Sgura – Tosca (Opera Australia); Teddy Tahu Rhodes – Don Giovanni
Best Female Performer in a Supporting Role in an Opera	Best Male Performer in a Supporting Role in an Opera
**Anna Devin – Faramondo**; Nicole Car – Don Giovanni; Taryn Fiebig – Don Giovanni; Anna Starushkevych – Farmondo	**Christopher Lowrey – Faramondo**; Shane Lowrencev – Don Giovanni; Teddy Tahu Rhodes – Faust; Warwick Fyfe – The Flying Dutchman (Victorian Opera)
Best Symphony Orchestra Concert	Best Chamber and Instrumental Ensemble Concert
**Reflections on Gallipoli – Australian Chamber Orchestra**; The Damnation of Faust – Melbourne Symphony Orchestra; Mahler 3 – Melbourne Symphony Orchestra; Tafelmusik's House of Dreams – Musica Viva	**Les Arts Florissants and Le Jardin des Voix in A Jardin A L'Italienne – Melbourne Recital Centre, Sydney Opera House and Perth International Arts Festival**; Goldner String Quartet - Musica Viva International Concert Series National Tour 2015 – Goldner String Quartet for Musica Viva Australia; Stephen Hough in Recital – Sydney Symphony Orchestra; The Sixteen – Melbourne Recital Centre, Sydney Opera House, Perth International Arts Festival, QPAC and ANU School of Music Llewellyn Hall
Best Individual Classical Performance
**William Christie – William Christie (Melbourne Recital Centre, Sydney Opera House and Perth International Arts Festival)**; Emanuel Ax – The Beethoven Piano Concertos (Sydney Symphony Orchestra); Asher Fisch – Beethoven Festival (West Australian Symphony Orchestra); Christian Tetzlaff – Christian Tetzlaff (Melbourne Recital Centre)

=== Dance and Physical Theatre ===
Best Ballet or Dance Work	Best Visual or Physical Theatre Production
**Frame of Mind – Sydney Dance Company**; Meeting – Antony Hamilton Projects, Arts House and Insite Arts; Motion Picture – Lucy Guerin Inc in association with Arts House; Precipice – Rachel Arianne Ogle	**The Paper Architect – Davy and Kristin McGuire and Perth International Arts Festival**; Beyond by Circa – Arts Centre Melbourne and Circa; Dislocate's If These Walls Could Talk – Marguerite Pepper Productions and Melbourne Festival; Tabac Rouge – Compagnie du Hanneton presented by Sydney Festival
Best Female Dancer in a Dance or Physical Theatre Production	Best Male Dancer in a Dance or Physical Theatre Production
**Chloe Leong – William Forsythe's Quintett (Sydney Dance Company)**; Madeline Eastoe – Giselle (The Australian Ballet); Elise May – Natalie Weir's The Red Shoes (Expressions Dance Company and Queensland Performing Arts Centre); Jesse Scales – William Forsythe's Quintett	**Cass Mortimer Eipper – William Forsythe's Quintett**; Alisdair Macindoe – Motion Picture; David Mack – William Forsythe's Quintett; Jack Ziesing – Natalie Weir's The Red Shoes
Best Choreography in a Dance or Physical Theatre Production
**Rafael Bonachela – Frame of Mind**; Antony Hamilton – Meeting; Natalie Weir – Natalie Weir's The Red Shoes; Stephen Page – Patyegarang (Bangarra Dance Theatre)

=== Contemporary Music ===
Best Australian Contemporary Concert	Best Contemporary Music Festival
**Chet Faker – National Tour 2015 (Chet Faker, Frontier Touring, Artist Voice, Opulent, Future Classic and Perth International Arts Festival)**; Tina Arena – Reset Tour (Tina Arena and New World Artists); Jimmy Barnes – 30:30 Hindsight Greatest Hits Tour 2014 (Jimmy Barnes and Live Nation in association with Premier Artists and A Day on The Green); Kylie Minogue – Kiss Me Once Tour (Kylie Minogue and Frontier Touring)	**Vivid Live 2015 – Destination NSW and Sydney Opera House**; The 26th Annual Byron Bay Bluesfest 2015 – Bluesfest; Laneway Festival – Lunatic Entertainment and Chugg Entertainment; Womadelaide 2015 – Womadelaide Foundation
Best International Contemporary Music Concert
**Ed Sheeran – X WORLD TOUR 2015 (Ed Sheeran and Frontier Touring)**; Foo Fighters – Sonic Highways World Tour 2015 (Foo Fighters and Frontier Touring); Paul Simon & Sting – On Stage Together (Paul Simon, Sting, and Live Nation); The Rolling Stones – 14 On Fire (The Rolling Stones, Frontier Touring, AEG Live and IEC Entertainment)

=== Other ===
Best Cabaret Performer	Best Comedy Performer
**Camille O'Sullivan – Camille O'Sullivan - Changeling (Arts Centre Melbourne)**; David Campbell and John Bucchino – David Campbell Sings John Bucchino (Luckiest Productions); Beccy Cole and Libby O'Donovan – The Cowgirl and the Showgirl (Adelaide Festival Centre Trust); Kim Smith – Nova Noir (Adelaide Festival Centre Trust)	**Judith Lucy – Ask No Questions of the Moth (Token Events)**; Ronny Chieng – You Don't Know What You're Talking About (Century Entertainment); Nazeem Hussain – Legally Brown (Live Nation); Matt Okine – The Other Guy (Century Entertainment); Sam Simmons – Spaghetti for Breakfast (Token Events)
Best Presentation for Children	Best Regional Touring Production
**The Rabbits – Opera Australia and Barking Gecko Theatre Company in association with West Australian Opera**; Carnival of the Animals – Circa and Queensland Performing Arts Centre; Hans Christian, You Must Be An Angel – Sydney Opera House and Arts Centre Melbourne; Pete the Sheep – Monkey Baa Theatre Company	**Festival of Circa – Circa**; Food – Force Majeure and Belvoir; Kelly – Queensland Theatre Company; Sons & Mothers – Performing Lines and No Strings Attached Theatre of Disability
Best Special Event
**The Incredible and Phenomenal Journey of The Giants to the Streets of Perth – Royal de Luxe and Perth International Arts Festival**

=== Industry ===
Best New Australian Work
**Kate Miller-Heidke (composer), Lally Katz (librettist) and Iain Grandage (musical arrangements and additional music) – The Rabbits**; Nicki Bloom (writer and co-lyricist), Quentin Grant (composer and co-lyricist) and Cameron Goodall (composer and co-lyricist) – Little Bird (State Theatre Company of South Australia in association with Adelaide Festival Centre); Aidan Fennessy (writer) and Tim Rogers (music and lyrics) – What Rhymes with Cars and Girls; Damien Millar – Marlin (Arena Theatre Company and Melbourne Theatre Company); Joanna Murray-Smith – Switzerland; Tamara Saulwick – Endings (Sydney Festival, Performance Space, Arts House and Insite Arts)
Best Original Score	Best Music Direction
**Kate Miller-Heidke and Iain Grandage – The Rabbits**; Cameron Goodall and Quentin Grant – Little Bird; Mikelangelo and Pip Branson performed by The Blacksea Gentlemen – Masquarade (Griffin Theatre Company and State Theatre Company of South Australia); Tim Rogers – What Rhymes With Cars and Girls	**Martin Lowe – Once^{[B]}**; Erin Helyard – Faramondo; Tim Rogers – What Rhymes With Cars and Girls; Timothy Sexton – Philip Glass Trilogy
Best Scenic Design	Best Costume Design
**Geoff Cobham – Little Bird**; Dan Potra – The Perfect American; Marg Horwell – Marlin; Matt Kinley – Les Misérables	**Gabriela Tylesova – The Rabbits**; Anna Cordingley – Masqaurade; Dale Ferguson – Anything Goes; Gary McCann – Faramondo
Best Lighting Design	Best Sound Design
**Paule Constable – Les Misérables**; Rachel Burke – Marlin; Geoff Cobham – Philip Glass Trilogy; Paule Constable – Faust; Nick Schlieper – Macbeth (Sydney Theatre Company)	**Mick Potter – Les Misérables**; Clive Goodwin – Once; JD Brill, Clair Global and Eagles – Eagles - History of the Eagles Live in Concert 2015 (The Eagles and Frontier Touring); Michael Waters – Anything Goes

=== Special awards ===
JC Williamson Award	Sue Nattrass Award
**Paul Kelly**	**Eric Robinson**

== Notes ==
A: The full producing credit for Dirty Dancing - The Classic Love Story on Stage is John Frost, Karl Sydow, Martin McCullum and Joyce Entertainment in association with Lionsgate & Magic Hour.
B: The full producing credit for Once is John Frost, Barbara Broccoli, John N. Hart Jr, Patrick Milling Smith and Frederick Zollo in association with the Melbourne Theatre Company.
