= Haroyan =

Haroyan or Aroyan (Armenian: Հարոյան) is an Armenian surname. Notable people with the surname include:

- Levan Haroyan (born 1970), Russian serial killer
- Lilit Haroyan (born 1990), Armenian actress
- Natalie Aroyan, Australian operatic soprano
- Varazdat Haroyan (born 1992), Armenian football player
