= 14th Helpmann Awards =

2014 Australian live performance awards

- Date: 18 August 2014
- Location: Capitol Theatre, Sydney
- Hosted by: Jonathan Biggins

Television/radio coverage
- Network: Arena

The 14th Annual Helpmann Awards for Australian live performance were held on 18 August 2014 at the Capitol Theatre in Sydney.

== Winners and nominees ==
In the following tables, winners are listed first and highlighted in boldface. The nominees are those which are listed below the winner and not in boldface.

=== Theatre ===
| Best Play | Best Direction of a Play |
|---|---|
| **Angels in America – Belvoir**; Roman Tragedies – Toneelgroep Amsterdam and Adelaide Festival in association with Adelaide Festival Centre; The Shadow King – Malthouse Theatre^{[A]}; Waiting for Godot – Sydney Theatre Company | **Michael Kantor – The Shadow King**; Sam Strong – The Floating World (Griffin Theatre Company); Andrew Upton – Waiting for Godot; Ivo van Hove – Roman Tragedies |
| Best Female Actor in a Play | Best Male Actor in a Play |
| **Cate Blanchett – The Maids (Sydney Theatre Company)**; Zahra Newman – The Mountaintop (Melbourne Theatre Company); Alison Whyte – The Bloody Chamber (Malthouse Theatre); Ursula Yovich – Mother Courage and Her Children (Queensland Theatre Company and Queensland Performing Arts Centre) | **Richard Roxburgh – Waiting for Godot**; Paul Blackwell – Vere (Faith) (State Theatre Company of South Australia and Sydney Theatre Company); Luke Carroll – The Cake Man (Yirra Yaakin Theatre Company and Belvoir); Denis O'Hare – An Iliad (Homer's Coat, Adelaide Festival and Perth International Arts Festival) |
| Best Female Actor in a Supporting Role in a Play | Best Male Actor in a Supporting Role in a Play |
| **Robyn Nevin – Angels in America**; Elizabeth Debicki – The Maids; Zahra Newman – The Government Inspector (Belvoir and Malthouse); Susan Prior – Small and Tired (Belvoir) | **Luke Mullins – Waiting for Godot**; Jimi Bani – The Shadow King; Tom Budge – The Beast (Melbourne Theatre Company in association with Melbourne Festival and Melbourne International Comedy Festival); Ewen Leslie – Rosencrantz and Guildenstern Are Dead (Sydney Theatre Company) |

=== Musicals ===
Best Musical
**The King & I – Opera Australia & John Frost**; Strictly Ballroom The Musical – Global Creatures; Richard O’Brien’s Rocky Horror Show – Howard Panter for Ambassador Theatre Group & John Frost; Sweet Charity – Luckiest Productions & Neil Gooding Productions in association with Hayes Theatre Co.
| Best Direction of a Musical | Best Choreography in a Musical |
| **Dean Bryant – Sweet Charity**; Baz Luhrmann – Strictly Ballroom The Musical; Rosemary Myers – Pinocchio (Windmill Theatre & State Theatre Company of South Australia); Christopher Renshaw – The King & I | **Andrew Hallsworth – Sweet Charity**; David Atkins & Dein Perry – Hot Shoe Shuffle (David Atkins Enterprises); Susan Kikuchi – The King & I; John O'Connell – Strictly Ballroom The Musical |
| Best Female Actor in a Musical | Best Male Actor in a Musical |
| **Verity Hunt-Ballard – Sweet Charity**; Lisa McCune – The King & I; Caroline O'Connor – Gypsy: A Musical Fable (The Production Company); Phoebe Panaretos – Strictly Ballroom The Musical | **Craig McLachlan – Richard O’Brien's Rocky Horror Show**; Martin Crewes – Sweet Charity; Matt Hetherington – Dirty Rotten Scoundrels (George Youakim); Josh Quong Tart – The Lion King (Disney Theatrical Productions Australia) |
| Best Female Actor in a Supporting Role in a Musical | Best Male Actor in a Supporting Role in a Musical |
| **Heather Mitchell – Strictly Ballroom The Musical**; Debora Krizak – Sweet Charity; Lucy Maunder – Grease (John Frost); Shu-Cheen Yu – The King & I | **Reg Livermore – Wicked (Marc Platt, David Stone, Universal Pictures, The Araca Group, Jon B. Platt, John Frost)**; Russell Dykstra – The Lion King; Drew Forsythe – Strictly Ballroom The Musical; Marty Rhone – The King & I |

=== Opera and Classical Music ===
| Best Opera | Best Direction of an Opera |
|---|---|
| **The Melbourne Ring Cycle – Opera Australia**; La Traviata – State Opera of South Australia, New Zealand Opera, Opera Queensland; Nixon in China – Victorian Opera; The Turk in Italy – Opera Australia | **Neil Armfield – The Melbourne Ring Cycle**; Roger Hodgman – Nixon in China; Chas Rader-Shieber – Orlando (Hobart Baroque in association with The Glimmerglass Festival); Simon Phillips – The Turk in Italy |
| Best Female Performer in an Opera | Best Male Performer in an Opera |
| **Christine Goerke – Elektra (Sydney Symphony Orchestra)**; Emma Matthews – The Turk in Italy; Jessica Pratt – La Traviata (Victorian Opera); Kathryn Lewek – Orlando | **Terje Stensvold – The Melbourne Ring Cycle**; Yonghoon Lee – Tosca (Opera Australia); Riccardo Massi – La Forza del Destino (Opera Australia); Barry Ryan – Nixon in China; Stefan Vinke – The Melbourne Ring Cycle |
| Best Female Performer in a Supporting Role in an Opera | Best Male Performer in a Supporting Role in an Opera |
| **Jacqueline Dark – The Melbourne Ring Cycle**; Miriam Gordon-Stewart – The Melbourne Ring Cycle; Eva Jinhee Kong – Nixon in China | **Warwick Fyfe – The Melbourne Ring Cycle**; Mario Bellanova – La Traviata (State Opera of South Australia, New Zealand Opera, Opera Queensland); Andrew Collis – Cinderella (Opera Queensland); Daniel Sumegi – The Melbourne Ring Cycle |
| Best Symphony Orchestra Concert | Best Chamber and/or Instrumental Ensemble Concert |
| **Royal Concertgebouw Orchestra – Arts Centre Melbourne, Perth Concert Hall, Queensland Performing Arts Centre and Sydney Opera House**; Asher Fisch Conducts and Plays Mozart – West Australian Symphony Orchestra; Bach Christmas Oratorio – Australian Chamber Orchestra; War Requiem – Sydney Symphony Orchestra | **The Jerusalem Project – Melbourne Recital Centre and Sydney Opera House**; Tokyo String Quartet – Musica Viva Australia; Akademie für Alte Musik Berlin – Sydney Festival; Murray Perahia in Recital – Melbourne Recital Centre and Sydney Symphony Orchestra |
Best Individual Classical Music Performance
**Julia Lezhneva – Julia Lezhneva with the Tasmanian Symphony Orchestra (Hobart Baroque)**; Mariss Jansons – Royal Concertgebouw Orchestra (Arts Centre Melbourne, Perth Concert Hall, Queensland Performing Arts Centre and Sydney Opera House); Murray Perahia – Murray Perahia (Melbourne Recital Centre in association with Sydney Symphony Orchestra); Andreas Scholl – Andreas Scholl sings Vivaldi (Australian Chamber Orchestra)

=== Dance and Physical Theatre ===
| Best Ballet or Dance Work | Best Visual or Physical Theatre Production |
|---|---|
| **Chroma – The Australian Ballet**; Bolshoi Ballet – The Bright Stream – Queensland Performing Arts Centre and Tourism & Events Queensland; Ballet at the Quarry: Radio and Juliet – West Australian Ballet; Sadeh21 – Batsheva Dance Company, Adelaide Festival and Perth International Arts Festival | **Whelping Box – Branch Nebula, Matt Prest & Clare Britton, produced by Intimate Spectacle & Performing Lines, presented by Performance Space & Arts House**; A Midsummer Night's Dream (As You Like It) – Chekhov International Theatre Festival, Dmitry Krymov's Laboratory and Perth International Arts Festival; Circus Under My Bed – Sydney Opera House, Melbourne International Comedy Festival, Arts Centre Melbourne, The Flying Fruit Fly Circus; Opus – Circa^{[B]} |
| Best Female Dancer in a Dance or Physical Theatre Production | Best Male Dancer in a Dance or Physical Theatre Production |
| **Charmene Yap – 2 in D Minor as part of Interplay (Sydney Dance Company)**; Lucinda Dunn OAM – Manon (The Australian Ballet); Fiona Evans – Onegin (West Australian Ballet); Dalisa Pigram – Gudirr Gudirr (Marrugeku and Sydney Festival) | **James Vu Anh Pham – 247 Days (Chunky Move)**; Daniel Gaudiello – Cinderella (The Australian Ballet); Andre Santos – Russell Kerr's Peter Pan (West Australian Ballet); Kimball Wong – Nought (Australian Dance Theatre) |
Best Choreography in a Dance or Physical Theatre Production
**Stephanie Lake – A Small Prometheus (Melbourne Festival, Arts House and Insite Arts)**; Rafael Bonachela – Les Illuminations (Sydney Dance Company and Sydney Opera House); Daniel Jaber – Nought (Australian Dance Theatre); Garry Stewart – Monument (The Australian Ballet); Natalie Weir – When Time Stops (Expressions Dance Company and Queensland Performing Arts Centre in association with Brisbane Festival)

=== Contemporary Music ===
| Best Australian Contemporary Concert | Best Contemporary Music Festival |
|---|---|
| **Hunters & Collectors – Hunters & Collectors, Frontier Touring and Roundhouse Entertainment**; Australian Chamber Orchestra featuring The Presets – Australian Chamber Orchestra, The Presets, Destination NSW and Sydney Opera House; Flume – Infinity Prism Tour – Flume, Future Classic, Lunatic Entertainment & Chugg Entertainment; Tame Impala – Tame Impala & Chugg Entertainment | **Byron Bay Bluesfest 2014 – Bluesfest**; Vivid Live – Destination NSW and Sydney Opera House; Laneway Festival 2014 – Lunatic Entertainment & Chugg Entertainment; The Falls Music & Arts Festival 2013 – Ash Sounds |
Best International Contemporary Music Concert
**Bruce Springsteen & the E Street Band 2014 – Bruce Springsteen & the E Street Band & Frontier Touring**; The Mrs. Carter Show World Tour starring Beyoncé – Beyonce & Live Nation; The Truth About Love Tour – P!nk & Live Nation; Eddie Vedder – Eddie Vedder & Chugg Entertainment

=== Other ===
| Best Cabaret Performer | Best Comedy Performer |
|---|---|
| **Sarah Ward – Yana Alana Between The Cracks (Ebony Bott at fortyfivedownstairs)**; Tommy Bradson – REG (Adelaide Festival Centre's Adelaide Cabaret Festival); Jerick Hoffer (as Jinkx Monsoon) – The Vaudevillians starring Jinkx Monsoon (Strut & Fret Production House); Lady Rizo – Lady Rizo (Adelaide Festival Centre's Adelaide Cabaret Festival and Sydney Festival) | **Sam Simmons – Death of a Sails-Man (Token Events)**; Ronny Chieng – Chieng Reaction (Century Entertainment); Tom Gleeson – Quality (Token Events); The Boy With Tape on His Face – More Tape (Live Nation & Gag Reflex) |
| Best Presentation for Children | Best Regional Touring Production |
| **Pinocchio – Windmill Theatre & State Theatre Company of South Australia**; The House Where Winter Lives – Punchdrunk and Perth International Arts Festival; Miss Ophelia – Arts Centre Melbourne and Sydney Opera House; Storm Boy – Barking Gecko Theatre Company and Sydney Theatre Company; Wulamanayuwi & the Seven Pamanui – Darwin Festival and Performing Lines | **Jack Charles vs The Crown – Ilbijerri Theatre Company and Performing Lines**; Djuki Mala - Chooky Dancers – Joshua Bond; G – Australian Dance Theatre; Happy As Larry – Shaun Parker & Company and Arts on Tour |

=== Industry ===
Best New Australian Work
**Rosemary Myers with Julianne O'Brien – Pinocchio (Windmill Theatre & State Theatre Company of South Australia)**; Jason De Santis & Eamon Flack – Wulamanayuwi & the Seven Pamanui (Darwin Festival and Performing Lines); Tom E. Lewis and Michael Kantor – The Shadow King; Tom Wright – Black Diggers (Queensland Theatre Company and Sydney Festival)^{[C]}
| Best Original Score | Best Music Direction |
| **Iain Grandage – When Time Stops**; David Chisholm – The Bloody Chamber; David Page & Paul Mac – Blak (Bangarra Dance Theatre); Nick Wales – AM I (Shaun Parker & Company in association with the Confederation of Australian International Arts Festivals, Sydney Festival, Adelaide Festival and Melbourne Festival); Jethro Woodward – Pinocchio | **Pietari Inkinen – The Melbourne Ring Cycle**; Nicolette Fraillon – Cinderella; Fabian Russell – Nixon in China; Andrew Worboys – Sweet Charity |
| Best Scenic Design | Best Costume Design |
| **Gabriela Tylesova – Rosencrantz and Guildenstern Are Dead**; Robert Cousins – The Melbourne Ring Cycle; Jonathan Oxlade – Pinocchio; Brian Thomson – The King & I | **Roger Kirk – The King & I**; Catherine Martin – Strictly Ballroom The Musical; Gabriela Tylesova – Rosencrantz and Guildenstern Are Dead; Gabriela Tylesova – The Turk in Italy |
| Best Lighting Design | Best Sound Design |
| **Nick Schlieper – Rosencrantz and Guildenstern Are Dead**; Geoff Cobham – Pinocchio; Nigel Levings – The King & I; Matt Scott – Nixon in China | **Michael Waters – The King & I**; Tony David Cray – Handa Opera on Sydney Harbour - Madama Butterfly (Opera Australia); Jessica James-Moody – Sweet Charity; Jethro Woodward – The Bloody Chamber |
Best Special Event
**Vivid Sydney 2013 – Destination NSW**

=== Special awards ===
| JC Williamson Award | Sue Nattrass Award |
|---|---|
| **John Frost** | **Patricia Boggs** |

== Notes ==
A: The full producing credit for The Shadow King is Malthouse Theatre in association with the Confederation of Australian International Arts Festivals – Adelaide Festival, Brisbane Festival, Melbourne Festival, Perth International Arts Festival and Sydney Festival.
B: The full producing credit for Opus is Circa, a Nuits de Fourvière production/ Département du Rhône, coproduced with Les Théâtres de la ville de Luxembourg, GREC Festival of Barcelona, Le Cirque-Théâtre d’Elbeuf, Düsseldorf Festival, Barbican Theatre, CACCV Espace Jean Legendre-Compiegne, in association with the Confederation of Australian International Arts Festivals, Brisbane Festival, Perth International Arts Festival and Melbourne Festival.
C: The full producing credit for Black Diggers is Queensland Theatre Company and Sydney Festival in association with the Confederation of Australian International Arts Festivals, presented by Sydney Festival, Brisbane Festival, Queensland Theatre Company and Queensland Performing Arts Centre.
