= Alana Valentine =

Australian actress, writer, and visual artist

- Education: University of Technology Sydney (1983); University of Sydney (2000)
- Occupations: Playwright; dramatist; librettist; director
- Writing career
- Genres: Theatre; film; opera; television
- Notable awards: Australian Writers Guild (many); Helpmann Award

Alana Valentine is an Australian playwright, dramatist, librettist, and director working in theatre, film, opera, and television.

== Early life and education ==
Alana Valentine graduated with a Bachelor of Communications from University of Technology Sydney (UTS) in 1983.

She also holds a Graduate Diploma in Museum Studies from the University of Sydney (2000).

== Career ==
Valentine wrote her first play Multiple Choice, in 1985, mentored by Alex Buzo. It was staged by the Australian Theatre for Young People as part of the Sydney Festival in 1986.

She has also written for television and film, starting with the series Lady Chaplain on SBS Television, and later McLeod's Daughters. She has written for short films, including Mother Love (1994), The Witnesses (1995), and Reef Dreaming (1997). She co-wrote the 2011 short film Moth with Meryl Tankard, which Tankard directed. It was shown in the 2012 Cannes Film Festival.

Valentine has collaborated as a co-writer and dramaturg with Aboriginal director and choreographer Stephen Page on many productions for Bangarra Dance Theatre since 2011, including Patyegarang in 2014 Bennelong in 2017, and Wudjang: Not the Past in 2022.

Valentine first worked with Vicki Gordon Music Productions to create the First Nations show Barefoot Divas, Walk a Mile in My Shoes. The work premiered at the Sydney Festival in 2012, toured North America in 2014 and was staged at the Hong Kong Arts Festival in 2015. In 2016 Gordon commissioned Valentine and Ursula Yovich to co-write the First Nations rock musical Barbara and the Camp Dogs. This premiered at the Belvoir Theatre in Sydney in December 2017, returning for an encore run at the Belvoir in April 2019 before touring the country that year.

The Charles Perkins Centre at the University of Sydney commissioned the work Made to Measure, completed by Valentine while she was writer-in-residence, and presented in 2019 at the Seymour Centre. Also in 2019, she co-wrote the libretto for Flight Memory, a song cycle, with composer Sandra France.

For the Sydney Festival 2021, Valentine wrote and directed the series Walkeys Live: The Journalist Gene, "a series of eight one-hour biographical portraits of eight Walkley Award-winning or recognised journalists". They were held at Sydney Town Hall.

In 2022 Valentine was commissioned by Neil Armfield to co-write the libretto with Christos Tsiolkas for a modern oratorio about the 1972 murder of George Duncan in Adelaide. With music composed by Joseph Twist, it was performed as Watershed: The Death of Dr Duncan to critical acclaim at the 2022 Adelaide Festival.

== Recognition and awards ==
- Several Australia Council grants and fellowships
- Residency at the Banff Playwrights' Conference, Canada
- 1993: Churchill Fellowship, to study the writing and production of radio drama, in the UK and Ireland
- 1994: Australian National Playwrights Centre (ANPC) New Dramatists Exchange, New York City
- 1999: AWGIE Award, Radio Original, for The Word Salon
- 2001: Centenary Medal, "For service to the Centenary of Federation celebrations through the Centennial ceremony"
- 2001: Commendation, Louis Esson Prize for Drama
- 2002: Joint winner, Rodney Seaborn Playwrights Award
- 2002: International Writing Fellowship at Shakespeare's Globe Theatre in London
- 2003: NSW Writer's Fellowship
- 2004: Winner, Queensland Premier's Literary Awards, Best Drama Script, for Run Rabbit Run
- 2007: Nomination, Helpmann Awards for Best New Australian Work and Best Play for Parramatta Girls
- 2008: Shortlisted, AWGIE Awards, Kit Denton Fellowship
- 2008: Shortlisted, Griffin Award for New Australian Playwriting for Redfern Heights (stage version)
- 2009: Literature Fund Fellowship (2 years) from the Australia Council for the Arts
- 2009: Winner, AWGIE Award for Community & Youth Theatre, for Watermark
- 2012: Winner, STAGE International Script Competition, for Ear to the Edge of Time
- 2013: Harold White Fellowship
- 2013: Winner, three Australian Writers Guild awards:
  - Major AWGIE Award (most outstanding script), for Grounded
  - Community and Youth Theatre, for Grounded
  - Inaugural $25,000 David Williamson Prize
- 2014: Winner, AWGIE Award for Community and Youth Theatre, for Comin' Home Soon
- 2014: Winner, British Council International Playwriting Award, for The Ravens
- 2015: Shortlisted, AWGIE Awards — Radio Award — Original Broadcast, for The Ravens
- 2016: Winner, PAC Australia Drovers Award for Tour of the Year, for Head Full of Love Queensland Theatre production]
- 2017: Joint recipient, Judy Harris Writer in Residence Fellowship (Note: The Judy Harris Writer in Residence Fellowship, managed by the Charles Perkins Centre, is awarded annually to a distinguished Australian writer who proposes a new major work that explores themes of relevance to the mission of the centre.)
- 2018: Shortlisted, Nick Enright Prize for Playwriting at the NSW Premier's Literary Awards, for Barbara and the Camp Dogs (with Ursula Yovich)
- 2018/9: Writer-in-residence at the Charles Perkins Centre at the University of Sydney
- 2019: Winner, Best Musical and Best Original Score, 19th Helpmann Awards, for Barbara and the Camp Dogs
- 2020: Winner, two Green Room Awards, for Music Composition and Sound Design, and Writing/Adaptation for the Australian Stage, for Barbara and the Camp Dogs
- 2021: Co-recipient of the UTS Chancellor's Award for excellence, in recognition of her accomplished work and the consistent excellence of her dramatic output
- 2021: Winner, UTS Faculty of Arts and Social Sciences Alumni Award
- 2024: Co-winner, AWGIE Award for Music Theatre], for Watershed: The Death of Dr Duncanwith Christos Tsiolkas

== Selected works ==
=== Plays ===
- Swimming The Globe (1996). A play about the parallel paths of two teen-age swimmers from different parts of the world who both strive to compete in the Olympics. It was first performed at the Mission Theatre in Newcastle, NSW, on 21 August 1996. It was commissioned by Freewheels Theatre Company, with the two girls played by Louise Chapman as Igorina and Kathryn Hume as Stace. It was also published as a performing arts book in 1999 by Currency Press.
- The Conjurers (1997)
- Run Rabbit Run (2004), about the South Sydney Rabbitohs, a rugby league club, staged at the Belvoir Theatre in 2004
- Covenant (2006)
- Parramatta girls (2007) about the Girls Training School, Parramatta. Produced at the Belvoir St Theatre. The play is on the HSC Drama syllabus in New South Wales. It is written as "a dramatisation of interviews with a number of women who served time in Australia’s most notorious girls detention centre".
- Singing the lonely heart is a one-act play is loosely based on the life of Carson McCullers. It was published together with Ozone in 2008.
- Ozone, a surreal fantasy
- Shafana and Aunt Sarrinah: Soft Revolution (2010) The play, performed at the Seymour Centre Sydney, 6–29 August 2009, is about "how Islamic women think and feel about" wearing the hijab. It was "commissioned by The Alex Buzo Company to 'respond' to Alex Buzo's play Norm and Ahmed"
- MP (2011)
- Ear to the Edge of Time (2012, science fiction)
- Dead Man Brake (2013), about the Waterfall rail accident. Produced by Merrigong Theatre Company.
- Barbara and the Camp Dogs (2017), co-written with Ursula Yovich. Produced by Belvoir.
- The Sugar House (2018), generational play set in a CSR warehouse in Pyrmont. Produced by Belvoir.
- Wayside Bride (2021) Produced by Belvoir (2022-04-02 to 2022-05-29).
- Wudjang: not the past (2022) Bangarra Dance Theatre
- Watershed: The Death of Dr Duncan (2022) Adelaide Festival, State Opera South Australia
- Nucleus (2025) Griffin Theatre Company

=== Films ===
- Mother Love (1994)
- The Witnesses (1995)
- Reef Dreaming (1997)
- Moth (2011; with Meryl Tankard)

=== Books ===
- Bowerbird: The Arts of Making Theatre Drawn from Life
