= Helpmann Award for Best Play =

Annual Australian theatre award

- Awarded for: Best Play
- Location: Australia
- Presented by: Live Performance Australia
- Currently held by: Counting & Cracking (2019)
- Website: HelpmannAwards.com.au

The Helpmann Award for Best Play is a theatre award, presented by Live Performance Australia (LPA) at the annual Helpmann Awards since 2001. The award is for a production of a play, which may be a new work or a revival of an existing work. This is a list of winners and nominations for the Helpmann Award for Best Play.

== Winners and nominees ==
Winners are listed first and marked in a separate colour.

=== 2000s ===
Year	Title	Production compan(y/ies)
2001 (1st)
2001 (1st)	Life After George	Melbourne Theatre Company
2001 (1st)	'Art'	Melbourne Theatre Company
2001 (1st)	Jimmy and Pat Meet the Queen	Deckchair Theatre
2001 (1st)	The Small Poppies	Company B Belvoir
2002 (2nd)
2002 (2nd)	Cloudstreet	Company B Belvoir and Black Swan Theatre
2002 (2nd)	Master Class	International Concert Attractions
2002 (2nd)	The Tempest	Melbourne Theatre Company
2002 (2nd)	Three Sisters	Sydney Theatre Company
2003 (3rd)
2003 (3rd)	Copenhagen	Sydney Theatre Company
2003 (3rd)	Soft	Back to Back and Melbourne Festival
2003 (3rd)	The Comedy of Errors	The Bell Shakespeare Company
2003 (3rd)	Waiting for Godot	Company B Belvoir and Sydney Festival
2004 (4th)
2004 (4th)	Inheritance	Melbourne Theatre Company
2004 (4th)	Myth, Propaganda and Disaster in Nazi Germany and Contemporary America - A Drama in 30 Scenes	Playbox Theatre
2004 (4th)	The Servant of Two Masters	The Bell Shakespeare Company
2004 (4th)	Frozen	Melbourne Theatre Company
2005 (5th)
2005 (5th)	The Sapphires	Melbourne Theatre Company
2005 (5th)	Twelve Angry Men	Arts Projects Australia and Adrian Bohm
2005 (5th)	Hedda Gabler	Sydney Theatre Company
2005 (5th)	Three Furies	Sydney Festival
2006 (6th)
2006 (6th)	Stuff Happens	Company B Belvoir and Newtheatricals
2006 (6th)	Away	Queensland Theatre Company and Griffin Theatre Company
2006 (6th)	The Goat, or Who Is Sylvia?	State Theatre Company of South Australia
2006 (6th)	Le Dernier Caravansérail	Melbourne International Arts Festival and Théâtre du Soleil
2007 (7th)
2007 (7th)	The Lost Echo	Sydney Theatre Company
2007 (7th)	Holding the Man	Griffin Theatre Company
2007 (7th)	Parramatta Girls	Company B Belvoir
2007 (7th)	The Season At Sarsaparilla	Sydney Theatre Company
2008 (8th)
2008 (8th)	Who's Afraid of Virginia Woolf?	Company B Belvoir
2008 (8th)	Black Watch	National Theatre of Scotland, Sydney Festival and Perth International Arts Festival
2008 (8th)	When The Rain Stops Falling	Brink Productions
2008 (8th)	Toy Symphony	Company B Belvoir
2009 (9th)
2009 (9th)	War of the Roses	Sydney Theatre Company
2009 (9th)	Women of Troy	Sydney Theatre Company
2009 (9th)	Ivanov	Katona Jozsef Theatre and Sydney Festival
2009 (9th)	Gatz	Sydney Opera House and Brisbane Powerhouse

=== 2010s ===
Year	Title	Production compan(y/ies)
2010 (10th)
2010 (10th)	Richard III	Melbourne Theatre Company
2010 (10th)	August: Osage County	Melbourne Theatre Company
2010 (10th)	Happy Days	Malthouse Theatre
2010 (10th)	The Book of Everything	Company B Belvoir and Kim Carpenter's Theatre of Image
2011 (11th)
2011 (11th)	The Wild Duck	Belvoir
2011 (11th)	The Diary of a Madman	Belvoir
2011 (11th)	Uncle Vanya	Sydney Theatre Company and Bell Shakespeare
2011 (11th)	Do not go gentle	fortyfivedownstairs
2012 (12th)
2012 (12th)	Ganesh Versus the Third Reich	Back to Back Theatre, Malthouse Theatre and Melbourne Festival
2012 (12th)	Neighbourhood Watch	Belvoir
2012 (12th)	The Boys	Griffin Theatre Company and Sydney Festival
2012 (12th)	The Importance of Being Earnest	Melbourne Theatre Company
2013 (13th)
2013 (13th)	The Secret River	Sydney Theatre Company, The Confederation of Australian International Arts Festivals, Sydney Festival, The Centenary of Canberra, Perth International Arts Festival
2013 (13th)	Medea	Belvoir and Australian Theatre for Young People
2013 (13th)	Death of a Salesman	Belvoir
2013 (13th)	Hedda Gabler	State Theatre Company of South Australia
2014 (14th)
2014 (14th)	Angels in America	Belvoir
2014 (14th)	Roman Tragedies	Toneelgroep Amsterdam presented by Adelaide Festival in association with Adelaide Festival Centre
2014 (14th)	The Shadow King	Malthouse Theatre in association with the Confederation of Australian International Arts Festivals (Adelaide Festival, Brisbane Festival, Melbourne Festival, Perth International Arts Festival and Sydney Festival)
2014 (14th)	Waiting for Godot	Sydney Theatre Company
2015 (15th)
2015 (15th)	The Glass Menagerie	Belvoir
2015 (15th)	Calpurnia Descending	Malthouse Theatre and Sydney Theatre Company
2015 (15th)	Suddenly Last Summer	Sydney Theatre Company
2015 (15th)	Endgame	Sydney Theatre Company
2016 (16th)
2016 (16th)	The Bleeding Tree	Griffin Theatre Company
2016 (16th)	North by Northwest	Melbourne Theatre Company and Kay + McLean Productions by special arrangement with Warner Bros. Theatre Ventures
2016 (16th)	Piece for Person and Ghetto Blaster	Performing Lines and Nicola Gunn
2016 (16th)	Prize Fighter	La Boite Theatre Company and Brisbane Festival
2017 (17th)
2017 (17th)	The Drover's Wife	Belvoir
2017 (17th)	Jasper Jones	Melbourne Theatre Company
2017 (17th)	Once in Royal David's City	Queensland Theatre and Black Swan State Theatre Company
2017 (17th)	Things I Know To Be True	State Theatre Company of South Australia and Frantic Assembly
2018 (18th)
2018 (18th)	The Children	Melbourne Theatre Company and Sydney Theatre Company
2018 (18th)	The Irresistible	Side Pony Productions and The Last Great Hunt
2018 (18th)	The Real and Imagined History of the Elephant Man	Malthouse Theatre
2018 (18th)	Black is the New White	Sydney Theatre Company
2018 (18th)	The Resistible Rise of Arturo Ui	Sydney Theatre Company
2018 (18th)	Laser Beak Man	Brisbane Festival, La Boite Theatre Company and Dead Puppet Society in association with PowerArts
2019 (19th)
2019 (19th)	Counting and Cracking	Belvoir and Co-Curious
2019 (19th)	Blackie Blackie Brown: The Traditional Owner of Death	Sydney Theatre Company and Malthouse Theatre
2019 (19th)	The Harp in the South: Part One and Part Two	Sydney Theatre Company
2019 (19th)	Song for a Weary Throat	Rawcus
2019 (19th)	Harry Potter and the Cursed Child (Parts One and Two)	Sonia Friedman Productions, Colin Callender and Harry Potter Theatrical Productions, and Michael Cassel
2019 (19th)	The Second Woman	Nat Randall and Anna Breckon and Performing Lines

== See also ==
- Helpmann Awards
