= Waltzing the Wilarra =

Australian musical by David Milroy

- Original language: English
- Written by: David Milroy
- Music by: David Milroy
- Characters: Old Toss; Sandy Barr; Detective; Mr. Mack; Charlie Runaway; Mrs. Cray; Elsa; Jack; Fay Griver; Young Harry; Athena; Young Harry; Levinia Templeton
- Setting: Post-World War II; Perth

Premiere
- Date: 3 February 2011
- Place: Subiaco Arts Centre, Leederville, Perth
- Directed by: Wesley Enoch

Waltzing the Wilarra is an Australian musical play written and composed by David Milroy, set in a mixed-race dance club in post-World War II Perth.

Yirra Yaakin Theatre Company premiered the work, which performed from 3 February to 6 March 2011 at the Subiaco Arts Centre as part of the Perth International Arts Festival.

Waltzing the Wilarra was very well received. The West Australian called it "a terrific production" with "a powerful, charismatic cast" and that "the music throughout is instantly memorable". PerthNow called it "a landmark production".

The production received three 2011 WA Equity Guild Awards from nine nominations, including Best New Play and Best Design for its composition/music. It was also nominated for three national Helpmann Awards in 2011 including Best Original Score.

A national tour production was produced in 2025, beginning at Frankston Arts Centre in Melbourne, Victoria on 3 July, and closing at Araluen Arts Centre in Alice Springs, Northern Territory on 22 October. The production was directed by Brittanie Shipway.

== Characters and cast ==
Character	Perth	National tour
Character	2011	2025
Old Toss/Sandy Barr/Detective	Ernie Dingo	Leonard Mickelo
Mr. Mack	Kelton Pell	Jalen Sutcliffe
Charlie Runaway	Trevor Jamieson	Shaka Cook
Mrs. Cray	Irma Woods	Lisa Maza
Elsa	Ursula Yovich	Lorinda May Merrypor
Jack	Tim Solly	Clancy Enchelmaier
Fay Griver	Alexandra Jones	Juliette Coates
Athena/Young Harry/Levinia Templeton	Jessica Clarke	Hannah Underwood

== Musical numbers ==
- "Waltzing the Wilarra"
- "Little Birdy" – Mr. Mack
- "I've Got Eyes" – Elsa and Charlie
- "Desert Rats" – Jack
