= Barbara and the Camp Dogs =

Rock musical by Ursula Yovich and Alana Valentine

- Music: Ursula Yovich; Alana Valentine; Adm Ventoura
- Lyrics: Ursula Yovich; Alana Valentine; Adm Ventoura
- Book: Ursula Yovich; Alana Valentine
- Premiere: 2 December 2017: Belvoir St Theatre, Sydney
- Productions: 2017 Sydney; 2019 Australian tour
- Awards: Helpmann Award for Best Musical; Helpmann Award for Best Original Score

Barbara and the Camp Dogs is a rock musical by Ursula Yovich and Alana Valentine with songs by Valentine, Yovich, and Adm Ventoura.

== Premise ==
The work concerns Barbara, an Aboriginal pub singer trying to make it in Sydney, and her cousin and foster sister René. When the health of Barbara's mother deteriorates, they embark on a pilgrimage back home to country in the Northern Territory.

== Productions ==
The musical's libretto was written by Ursula Yovich and Alana Valentine, with songs by Valentine, Yovich, and Adm Ventoura.

Barbara and the Camp Dogs premiered at the Belvoir St Theatre, Sydney in December 2017, featuring Yovich (Barbara) and Elaine Crombie (René). The production was directed by Leticia Cáceres and produced by Belvoir in association with Vicki Gordon Music Productions.

It returned for an encore run at the Belvoir in April 2019 before touring the country that year, including Brisbane, Melbourne, Wollongong, and Canberra.

== Awards ==
=== Wins ===
- 2019: Winner, four 2019 Helpmann Awards, including Best Musical and Best Original Score

=== Nominations ===
- 2018: Nomination, AWGIE Award for Music Theatre
- 2019: Shortlisted, New South Wales Premier's Literary Awards' Nick Enright Prize for Playwriting
- 2019: Shortliste, Victorian Premier's Literary Awards' Prize for Drama
