= Helpmann Award for Best Musical =

Australian musical theatre award

- Awarded for: Best Musical
- Location: Australia
- Presented by: Live Performance Australia
- Currently held by: Barbara and the Camp Dogs (2019)
- Website: HelpmannAwards.com.au

The Helpmann Award for Best Musical is a musical theatre award, presented by Live Performance Australia (LPA) at the annual Helpmann Awards since 2001. The award is for a production in Australia, and is open to both new musicals and revivals. This is a list of winners and nominations for the Helpmann Award for Best Musical.

== Winners and nominees ==
Winners are listed first and marked in a separate colour.

=== 2000s ===
Year	Title	Production compan(y/ies)
2001 (1st)
2001 (1st)	The Boy from Oz	Gannon Fox Productions
2001 (1st)	Chicago	Barry & Fran Weissler, David Atkins Enterprises and International Management Group
2001 (1st)	Company	Melbourne Theatre Company
2001 (1st)	The Sound of Music	SEL and GFO
2002 (2nd)
2002 (2nd)	Mamma Mia!	Littlestar, Universal Pictures Stage Entertainment and Dainty Consolidated Entertainment
2002 (2nd)	Singin' in the Rain	David Atkins Enterprises and IMG
2002 (2nd)	Sweeney Todd: The Demon Barber of Fleet Street	Opera Australia
2002 (2nd)	The Wizard of Oz	SEL and GFO and Macks Entertainment
2003 (3rd)
2003 (3rd)	Cabaret	IMG and Barry & Fran Weissler
2003 (3rd)	Oliver!	IMG
2003 (3rd)	Man of La Mancha	SEL & GFO
2003 (3rd)	The Witches of Eastwick	Jacobsen Entertainment Ltd and Cameron Mackintosh
2004 (4th)
2004 (4th)	The Lion King	Disney Theatrical Productions (Australia)
2004 (4th)	We Will Rock You	Michael Coppel, Queen Theatrical Productions, Phil McIntyre and Tribeca Theatrical Productions, EMI, Michael Watt, Paul Roberts, Bob and Kate Gare
2004 (4th)	Oh! What A Night	Jon Nicholls, Michael Brereton and Stuart Littlewood
2004 (4th)	The Full Monty	David Atkins Enterprises, IMG, International Concert Attractions and Arts Centre Melbourne
2005 (5th)
2005 (5th)	The Producers	SEL & GFO and Bialystock & Bloom New York Co.
2005 (5th)	The Black Rider	Sydney Festival in association with International Concert Attractions and Andrew Kay & Associates
2005 (5th)	Urinetown	Melbourne Theatre Company
2005 (5th)	Eureka	Simon Gallaher and Michael Harvey
2006 (6th)
2006 (6th)	The 25th Annual Putnam County Spelling Bee	Melbourne Theatre Company
2006 (6th)	Dusty – The Original Pop Diva	Dusty Productions
2006 (6th)	Fiddler on the Roof	TML Enterprises
2006 (6th)	Menopause The Musical	McPherson Ink
2007 (7th)
2007 (7th)	Keating!	Company B
2007 (7th)	Hedwig and the Angry Inch	Showtune Productions
2007 (7th)	Miss Saigon	Miss Saigon (Australia 2007/08) Pty Ltd
2007 (7th)	Priscilla, Queen of the Desert	Liz Koops and Garry McQuinn (Back Row Productions), Alan Scott, Michael Chugg (Chugg Entertainment), Michael Hamlyn (Specific Films) and John Frost
2008 (8th)
2008 (8th)	Billy Elliot the Musical	Universal Pictures Stage Entertainment, Working Title Films and Old Vic Productions
2008 (8th)	Guys and Dolls	Ambassador Theatre Group, Shows Inc, Marriner Theatres and Tulchin/Bartner Productions
2008 (8th)	Company	Kookaburra: The National Musical Theatre Company
2008 (8th)	The Phantom of the Opera	Really Useful Group (Asia Pacific) and The Gordon/Frost Organisation
2009 (9th)
2009 (9th)	Wicked	Marc Platt, David Stone, Universal Pictures, The Araca Group, Jon B. Platt and John Frost
2009 (9th)	Shane Warne The Musical	Token Events
2009 (9th)	My Fair Lady	Opera Australia
2009 (9th)	Monty Python's Spamalot	Ozalot Pty Ltd

=== 2010s ===
Year	Title	Production compan(y/ies)
2010 (10th)
2010 (10th)	Jersey Boys	Dodger Theatricals, Rodney Rigby and Dainty Consolidated Entertainment
2010 (10th)	The Drowsy Chaperone	Melbourne Theatre Company
2010 (10th)	Avenue Q	Arts Asia Pacific and Power Arts
2010 (10th)	The Wizard of Oz	Windmill Theatre
2011 (11th)
2011 (11th)	Mary Poppins	Disney and Cameron Mackintosh
2011 (11th)	Love Never Dies	Really Useful Group (Asia Pacific) and Asia Pacific and Arts Capital Trust
2011 (11th)	Hairspray	Paul Dainty, Dainty Group, Joel Pearlman and Roadshow Live
2011 (11th)	Doctor Zhivago	John Frost, Anita Waxman/Tom Dokton, Latitude Link, Power Arts, Chun-Soo Shin and Corcoran Productions
2012 (12th)
2012 (12th)	A Chorus Line	Tim Lawson and Adelaide Festival Centre
2012 (12th)	An Officer and a Gentleman	Sharleen Cooper Cohen and John Frost
2012 (12th)	Rock of Ages	Rodney Rigby and the Rock of Ages Australia Management
2012 (12th)	Grey Gardens	The Production Company
2013 (13th)
2013 (13th)	Legally Blonde	Howard Panter for the Ambassador Theatre Group and John Frost
2013 (13th)	The Addams Family	Rodney Rigby, Stuart Oken, Roy Furman, Michael Leavitt, Five Cent Productions and Elephant Eye Theatrical
2013 (13th)	A Funny Thing Happened on the Way to the Forum	John Frost
2013 (13th)	South Pacific	Opera Australia and John Frost
2014 (14th)
2014 (14th)	The King and I	Opera Australia and John Frost
2014 (14th)	The Rocky Horror Show	Howard Panter for the Ambassador Theatre Group and John Frost
2014 (14th)	Strictly Ballroom	Global Creatures
2014 (14th)	Sweet Charity	Luckiest Productions & Neil Gooding Productions in association with Hayes Theatre Co
2015 (15th)
2015 (15th)	Les Misérables	Cameron Mackintosh and Michael Cassel
2015 (15th)	Anything Goes	Opera Australia and John Frost
2015 (15th)	Once	John Frost, Barbara Broccoli, John N. Hart Jr, Patrick Milling Smith and Frederick Zollo in association with the Melbourne Theatre Company
2015 (15th)	Dirty Dancing – The Classic Story on Stage	John Frost, Karl Sydow, Martin McCallum and Joye Entertainment in association with Lionsgate & Magic Hour
2016 (16th)
2016 (16th)	Matilda the Musical	The Royal Shakespeare Company and Louise Withers, Michael Coppel and Michael Watt with Chokey Productions, Just for Laughs Theatricals, Glass Half Full Productions, Paula Marie Black, Greenleaf Productions and Michael Lynch
2016 (16th)	Fiddler on the Roof	Tim Lawson for TML Enterprises
2016 (16th)	Ladies in Black	Queensland Theatre Company
2016 (16th)	The Sound of Music	Andrew Lloyd Webber, David Ian, John Frost and The Really Useful Group
2017 (17th)
2017 (17th)	The Book of Mormon	Anne Garefino, Scott Rudin, Important Musicals, John Frost, Roger Berlind, Scott M. Delman, Jean Doumanian, Roy Furman, Stephanie P. McClelland, Kevin Morris, Jon B. Platt, Sonia Friedman Productions
2017 (17th)	Aladdin	Disney Theatrical (Australia)
2017 (17th)	My Fair Lady	Opera Australia & John Frost
2017 (17th)	Kinky Boots	Michael Cassel by special arrangement with Daryl Roth & Hal Luftig
2018 (18th)
2018 (18th)	Beautiful: The Carole King Musical	Michael Cassel in association with Paul Blake, Sony/ATV Music Publishing and Mike Bosner
2018 (18th)	Mamma Mia!	Michael Coppel, Louise Withers and Linda Bewick
2018 (18th)	Dream Lover: The Bobby Darin Musical	John Frost and Gilbert Theatrical
2018 (18th)	Muriel's Wedding	Sydney Theatre Company and Global Creatures
2019 (19th)
2019 (19th)	Barbara and the Camp Dogs	Belvoir in association with Vicki Gordon Music Productions
2019 (19th)	In the Heights	Sydney Opera House and The Arthouse Wyong Presents, produced by Blue Saint Productions in association with Neil Gooding
2019 (19th)	Roald Dahl's Charlie and the Chocolate Factory	John Frost, Craig Donnell, Warner Bros. Theatre Ventures, Langley Park Productions and Neal Street Productions
2019 (19th)	Handa Opera on Sydney Harbour: West Side Story	Opera Australia

== See also ==
- Helpmann Awards
