= Ursula Yovich =

Australian actor-singer

- Ursula Yovich performing with The Sapphires 2005 (Deborah Mailman, Rachel Maza and Lisa Flanagan on the right)
- Born: Darwin, Northern Territory, Australia
- Occupations: Actress, singer

Ursula Yovich is an Aboriginal Australian actress and singer. She is known for numerous stage appearances, for co-writing and appearing in the rock musical Barbara and the Camp Dogs (2017), and several film and TV appearances.

== Early life and education ==
Yovich was born in 1977 in Darwin, Northern Territory, Australia, and also grew up there. Her father, Slobodan Jović, was a Bosnian Serb immigrant who anglicised his name to Yovich. Her mother is an Aboriginal Burarra woman from north-west Arnhem Land near the Blyth River, with the closest community being Maningrida. Raised in Darwin with her Dad, both her parents spoke English as a second language.

Yovich started singing when she was young, and at the age of 13, began formal music training when her father enrolled her in singing classes. She later joined one of the local youth theatre groups. She eventually left Darwin to study in Perth, graduating from the Aboriginal Centre for the Performing Arts in 1996, before eventually relocating to Sydney.

== Career ==
Yovich has appeared in more than 50 theatre and musical theatre productions, including Capricornia, Mother Courage and her Children, The Sapphires, Natural Life, Nailed, The Sunshine Club, Jerry Springer the Opera, Nathaniel Storm, and The Adventures of Snugglepot & Cuddlepie and Little Ragged Blossom.

Yovich co-wrote the libretto and songs for rock musical Barbara and the Camp Dogs with Alana Valentine, and appeared in the show alongside Elaine Crombie. She wrote and starred in her own one-woman cabaret, Magpie Blues and also wrote The Man with the Iron Neck, which toured Australia from 2018 to 2019.

Yovich featured in Australia's first Aboriginal opera, Pecan Summer. She toured both locally and internationally with the musicians of Black Arm Band in Dirtsong. She has also performed in the all-girl group, Barefoot Divas.

Yovich's film credits include drama Jindabyne (2006), Baz Luhrmann epic Australia (2008), Around the Block (2013), crime thriller Goldstone (2016) and romantic comedy Top End Wedding (2019).

She has appeared in television series' including Redfern Now, season 2 of the crime drama series Mystery Road, and the comedy series Preppers. Other television credits include Wakefield, Wanted, The Code, The Gods of Wheat Street. Rake, The Moth Effect, The Twelve, Irreverent, How to Stay Married, Doctor Doctor, Faboriginal and Devil's Dust.

Yovich is a writer on the NITV animated children's TV series Little J & Big Cuz, in which she also voiced the characters of Nanna and Levi. Additionally, she was the subject of an episode of the SBS documentary series Blaktrax.

In 2019, while filming for Mystery Road, Yovich announced that after 22 years, she was stepping away from the theatre, saying she couldn't pretend that she wanted to pursue theatre any longer. In 2024, she made a theatre comeback, appearing in The Lewis Trilogy.

== Awards and nominations ==
Year	Work	Award	Category	Result	Ref
2002	Ursula Yovich	Tudawali Awards	Bob Maza Memorial Award	Won	
2007	Capricornia	Helpmann Awards	Best Female Actor in a Play	Won	
2010	Magpie Blues	Helpmann Awards	Best Cabaret Performer	Nominated	
2015	Ursula Yovich	Sidney Myer Performing Arts Awards	Outstanding Body of Work in Theatre	Won	
2016	The Eulogy (pitch/unwritten)	Balnaves Foundation	Indigenous playwrights award	Won	
2017	Barbara and the Camp Dogs	Sydney Theatre Awards	Best New Australian Work	Nominated	
2017	Barbara and the Camp Dogs	Sydney Theatre Awards	Best Original Score	Nominated	
2017	Barbara and the Camp Dogs	Sydney Theatre Awards	Best Female Actor	Nominated	
2018	Barbara and the Camp Dogs	AWGIE Awards	Music Theatre AWGIE	Nominated	
2019	Barbara and the Camp Dogs	Helpmann Awards	Best Female Actor in a Musical	Won	
2019	Barbara and the Camp Dogs	Helpmann Awards	Best Original Score	Won	
2019	Barbara and the Camp Dogs	New South Wales Premier's Literary Awards	Nick Enright Prize for Playwriting (with Alana Valentine)	Nominated	
2019	Top End Wedding	AACTA Awards	Best Supporting Actor	Nominated	
2020	Top End Wedding	Film Critic's Circle of Australia Awards	Best Supporting Actor	Won	
2021	Ursula Yovich	Ensemble Theatre	Sandra Bates Director's Award	Won	

== Personal life ==
As of 2009 Yovich was married to Stewart O'Connell, a lawyer, and the couple has one daughter.

== Filmography ==
=== Film ===
Year	Title	Role	Notes
1998	My Bed Your Bed	Della	Short film
2006	Jindabyne	Alice	
2008	$9.99	Camille (voice)	Animated film
2008	Australia	Daisy	
2010	Aesop's Way	Adrian's Wife	Short film
2013	Destiny in the Dirt	Danni	Short film
2013	Around the Block	Chrissie	
2014	Spirit Stones	Eva	Short film
2016	Goldstone	Maria	
2019	Top End Wedding	Daffy Ford	
2019	Totem and Ore	Testimonies reader	Documentary
2023	The Royal Hotel	Carol	
TBA	It Will Find You	Aunty	Completed
TBA	Whale Shark Jack	Hazel	In post-production

=== Television ===
Year	Title	Role	Notes
2002	Blue Heelers	Elvira Cook	Episode: "Reflection"
2012	Devil's Dust	Pauline Gordon	Miniseries, 2 episodes
2012–2013	Redfern Now	Nic Shields	Episodes: "Stand Up", "Pokies"
2014	Rake	Holly	Episodes: "3.4", "3.5"
2014	The Gods of Wheat Street	Eden Freeburn	Regular role, 6 episodes
2014	The Code	Kitty Boyd	Recurring role, 5 episodes
2017–2021	Little J & Big Cuz	Levi	37 episodes
2018	Wanted	Shirley	Episode: "3.3"
2020	Mystery Road	Pansy	6 episodes
2021	The Moth Effect	Megan	Episode: "Have You Heard of the White Ant?"
2021	Preppers	Kelly	6 episodes
2021	Doctor Doctor	Magistrate	Episode: "Reasonable Doubt"
2021	Wakefield	Maria	1 episode
2022	The Twelve	Hope Saunders	4 episodes
2022	Irreverent	Grace	6 episodes
2023	Deadloch		6 episodes
2023	Home and Away	Victoria Hudson	2 episodes
2023	Faraway Downs	Daisy	6 episodes
2024	Total Control	Robin	Episode: #3.4
2024	Blakball	Various roles	
2024	Pleasant Avenue	Iris King	Miniseries, 4 episodes
2024	Troppo	Ronnie	8 episodes
2025	Playing Gracie Darling	Zarah Cusic	1 episode
2025	Top End Bub	Daffy Ford	8 episodes

== Theatre ==
=== As performer ===
Year	Title	Role	Notes	Ref
1999	The Sunshine Club		STC / QTC	
2001	The Small Poppies	Lep	Belvoir, Sydney	
2001–2002	My Girragunji	Various roles	Bell Shakespeare	
2002	The Dreamers	Meena	Belvoir, Sydney	
2002	The Anatomy Lesson of De Ryush	Rachel	Vitalstatistix	
2003–2004	The Threepenny Opera	Polly	Belvoir, Sydney, Bogata Festival, Columbia	
2004	Riverland	Milly	Windmill Theatre Co	
2004–2005	The Sapphires	Julie	MTC, Belvoir, Sydney	
2005	Nailed	May	Griffin Theatre Company	
2006	Capricornia	Tocky O'Cannon	Belvoir, Sydney	
2006	Seven Stages of Grieving	Solo show	STC	
2006	Afternoon of the Elves	Jane	Windmill Theatre Co	
2007	The Adventures of Snugglepot and Cuddlepie and Little Ragged Blossom	Ragged Blossom	Belvoir, Sydney / Windmill Theatre Co	
2008	Romeo & Juliet	Nurse	STC	
2008	An Oak Tree	Guest	Belvoir, Sydney	
2009	Jerry Springer: The Opera	Andrea	Sydney Opera House	
2009	One Night the Moon	The Tracker's Wife	Malthouse Theatre, Melbourne	
2009	The Wizard of Oz	Dorothy	Sydney Theatre with Windmill Theatre Co and STC	
2009–2010	Magpie Blues		International Cabaret Festival, Adelaide, Darwin Festival, Brisbane Cabaret Festival, Garma Festival, Arnhem Land, Melbourne International Arts Festival	
2010	Waltzing the Willarra	Elsa	Yirra Yaakin Theatre Company, Perth	
2010	Pecan Summer (opera)	Singer		
2011	Bloodland	Cherish	STC	
2012; 2013	Barefoot Divas		Sydney Festival, Queensland Music Festival	
2012; 2014	The Magic Hour	Solo show	Deckchair Theatre, Perth, Australian tour with Performing Lines	
2013	The Secret River	Dhirrumbin	STC	
2013	Mother Courage and Her Children	Mother Courage	QPAC with QTC	
2014	A Christmas Carol	Mrs Cratchett	Belvoir, Sydney	
2014	20 Questions		Belvoir, Sydney	
2014	Santos Opening Night Concert	MC	Garmalang Festival, Darwin	
2015	Dirt Song	Performer	NZ tour with Black Arm Band	
2015	Love and Information	Various roles	STC / Malthouse Theatre	
2015	Four Little Birds		Garmalang Festival, Darwin	
2016	The Golden Age	Elizabeth	STC	
2016	Power Plays	TV Producer	STC	
2016	Creature: Dot & the Kangaroo	Kangaroo	QPAC, Brisbane with Stalker Theatre for Out of the Box festival	
2017	Heart is a Wasteland	Raye	Brown Cab Productions / Malthouse Theatre	
2017	Diving for Pearls	Barbara	Griffin Theatre Company	
2017	1967: Songs in the Key of Yes		Adelaide Festival, Sydney Opera House for Sydney Festival with Secret Chord	
2017; 2019	Barbara and the Camp Dogs	Barbara	Belvoir, Sydney	
2018	The Resistible Rise of Arturo Ui	Givola	STC	
2018	Vivaldi's Four Seasons (development)	Performer	Force Majeure	
2018	Dubboo – Life of a Songman	Artist	Carriageworks, Sydney with Bangarra Dance Theatre	
2018–2019	Man with the Iron Neck	Rose	Brisbane Festival, Sydney Festival, Adelaide Festival, Darwin Festival with Legs on the Wall	
2019	Badu Gili (live music series)		Sydney Opera House	
2020	The 5th Baiame's	Performer	Ngunnhu Festival 2020	
2021; 2024	Well-Behaved Women	Ensemble Cast	Neglected Musicals / Belvoir, Sydney	
2022; 2023	An Evening with Ursula Yovich	Solo performer	Ensemble Theatre, Sydney, Sydney Festival	
2023	Aretha: A Love Letter to the Queen of Soul	Performer	Sydney Opera House	
2024	The Lewis Trilogy	Norma / Cherry / Malcolm	Stables Theatre, Sydney with Griffin Theatre Company	
2025	The Black Woman of Gippsland	Auntie Rochelle / Ensemble	MTC	
	Natural Life			
	Nathaniel Storm			
	Corrugation Road		Black Swan State Theatre Company	
	Darlinghurst Nights		Darwin Theatre Company	
	Winyanboga Yurringa		Carriageworks, Sydney	
	Red Carpet Cabaret		Darlinghurst Theatre	

=== As writer/director ===
Year	Title	Role	Notes	Ref
2017; 2019	Barbara and the Camp Dogs	Playwright	Belvoir St Theatre, Sydney	
2018	The Fever and the Fret (development)	Director	Ensemble Theatre, Sydney	
2018–2019	Man with the Iron Neck	Playwright	Brisbane Festival, Sydney Festival, Adelaide Festival, Darwin Festival with Legs on the Wall	
2021	Outdated	Assistant Director	Ensemble Theatre, Sydney	
2022	A Letter for Molly	Director	Ensemble Theatre, Sydney	
2023; 2024	Tracker	Co-writer	Australian national tour with Australian Dance Theatre & Ilbijerri Theatre Company	

== Discography ==
- Sketches EP (2004)
- Ursula Yovich Live (2010)
- Well-Behaved Women (2023, contributing vocalist)
