= Once in Royal David's City (play) =

2014 play by Michael Gow

- Written by: Michael Gow
- Original language: English

Premiere
- Date premiered: 8 February 2014
- Place premiered: Belvoir St Theatre, Sydney

Once in Royal David's City is a play by Australian playwright Michael Gow.

Once in Royal David's City premiered in 2014 for Belvoir in Sydney, directed by Eamon Flack and featuring Brendan Cowell in the lead role of Will.

It was revived in 2017 for Queensland Theatre and Black Swan State Theatre Company, directed by Sam Strong, for seasons in Brisbane and Perth. The 2017 production was nominated for the Helpmann Award for Best Play.
