= Levan Haroyan =

Russian serial killer (born 1970)

- Леван Ароян
- Born: Levan Vakhtangovich Haroyan; 27 April 1970 (age 56); Soviet Union
- Other name: "Krasnodar Chikatilo"
- Convictions: Murder (5 counts); Rape
- Penalty: Compulsory treatment

Details
- Victims: 5–20+
- Span of crimes: 1996–2002
- Country: Russia
- State: Krasnodar Krai
- Date apprehended: 6 March 2002

Levan Vakhtangovich Haroyan (Russian: Леван Вахтангович Ароян; born 27 April 1970), nicknamed the Krasnodar Chikatilo (Russian: краснодарский Чикатило), is a Russian serial killer who was convicted of five murders committed between 1996 and 2002. He confessed to 17 murders and was suspected to have committed upwards of 20. His victims were female hitchhikers, whom he robbed, sexually assaulted, and strangled in and around Krasnodar.

== Background ==
Haroyan was 32 years old at the time of his arrest. He was 2 metres (6 ft 7 in) tall, unmarried, and had worked as a driver for his entrepreneur father. He was deeply bothered by what he described as the "immoral behaviour" of women and had been previously forced to undergo treatment at the Serbsky Center in Moscow for schizophrenia.

== Murders and imprisonment ==
Haroyan committed his first murders in early 1996, when the bodies of strangled women began to appear around Krasnodar. His first two victims were students of the Kuban State Agrarian University. After offering his victims a ride home from work or university, he would give them an ultimatum: 100 to 200 rubles for sex, or he would murder them. Regardless of their choice, he would strangle them after sex and dump their bodies in bushes along the roadside, and in one instance, he lit the victim's remains on fire.

On 4 December 2001, law enforcement organized a team to investigate the murders. Haroyan was detained at one point but was released due to insufficient evidence.

His final victim was a 28-year-old lawyer. She was discovered asphyxiated on 2 March 2002, in a forest belt in the village of Znamensky. Four days later, Haroyan was apprehended due to a tip from someone who had witnessed the woman entering his white Volga. Haroyan told investigators that the woman was a friend of his father, whom he offered to give a ride home, and after an argument, had strangled her.

During interrogation, Haroyan freely confessed to his crimes, describing them as a "fight against the immoral behaviour of females". Due to his mental instability, he was declared insane and sentenced to compulsory treatment at a psychiatric hospital, where he remained as of 2012.

== See also ==
- List of Russian serial killers
