= Counting and Cracking =

Play by S. Shakthidharan

Counting and Cracking is a play by Australian storyteller with Sri Lankan heritage and Tamil ancestry S. Shakthidharan (better known as Shakthi). Theatre director Eamon Flack is credited as associate writer. The three-and-a-half hour play is based on the playwright's family story, and follows four generations from 1956 to 2004, from Sri Lanka to Australia. It had its world premiere January 2019 at the Sydney Festival, with the same production staged as part of the Adelaide Festival in March 2019.

The play won seven Helpmann Awards, including Best Play and Best New Australian Work, as well as other awards, including the Victorian Prize for Literature in 2020. S Shakthidharan won the Windham-Campbell Prize for drama in 2026 for his plays, including Counting and Cracking.

== Synopsis ==
The play concerns four generations of the one Tamil family across Sri Lanka and Australia, from 1956 to 2004.

It was inspired by the playwright's own family story, and is based half on their experiences, and half from interviews undertaken by the playwright S. Shakthidharan (better known as Shakthi). Shakthi said "It's a story about reconciliation: between parents and children, between neighbours and enemies, between your new home and your old home, between society and its institutions".

The first lines of the play are spoken in Tamil and Sinhala, and translated into English by actors not participating in the action in that scene. there are additional short lines in Tamil and Sinhalese, translated as it moves on.

== Original cast and crew ==
The cast in Sydney and Adelaide included Vaishnavi Suryaprakash and Kalieaswari Srinivasan (both as Radha); Jay Emmanuel and Antonythasan Jesuthasan (as Thirru); Shiv Palekar (as Sid/Siddhartha); Rarriwuy Hick (Lily).

Other cast members were Prakash Belawadi, Arky Michael, Nicholas Brown, Ahi Karunaharan, Monica Kumar, Gandhi MacIntyre, Monroe Reimers, Nipuni Sharada, Rajan Velu, and Sukania Venugopal. Sixteen of the actors take on many roles throughout the performance.

The musicians in Sydney were Janakan Raj, Kranthi Kiran Mudigonda, and Venkhatesh Sritharan.

Anandavalli, Shakthi's mother, an internationally renowned dancer, choreographer, and teacher, was costume and cultural advisor, and choreographed the production.

Stefan Gregory was composer and sound designer. Dale Ferguson designed the sets and Damien Cooper was responsible for the lighting.

== Productions ==
The play was first produced by Belvoir and Co-Curious at the Sydney Town Hall in January 2019 for the Sydney Festival in Sydney, with artistic director of the Belvoir, Eamon Flack as director. It has a cast of 19 and runs for three and a half hours. The same production was then staged at the Adelaide Festival in Adelaide in March 2019. Both seasons sold out.

In August 2022, as part of the "UK/Australia Season", a collaboration between the British Council and the Australian Government's Department of Foreign Affairs and Trade, Counting and Cracking toured to the UK, first at the Royal Lyceum as part of the Edinburgh Festival and then Birmingham Rep, as part of the Birmingham Festival. The cast featured 19 performers. The Times gave it a five-star review, while The Guardian and the Financial Times both gave four out of five.

From 31 May to 23 June 2024, the show was presented as part of the RISING: festival in Melbourne, at the University of Melbourne's Union Theatre, with 19 performers from six countries playing 50 different characters. It was a Belvoir and Kurinji co-production. It then played a return Sydney season at Carriageworks.

In September 2024, the show was presented at the Skirball Center for the Performing Arts in Manhattan, New York City in a co-production with The Public Theater. The production will return to New York in Summer 2027 as part of the Public's Shakespeare in the Park series at the Delacorte Theater.

== Awards ==
Shakthidharan's script was originally titled A Counting and Cracking of Heads, and was the joint winner of the 2015 NSW Philip Parsons Fellowship for Emerging Playwrights.

Counting and Cracking received seven 2019 Helpmann Awards including Best Play and Best New Australian Work and won best mainstage production at the 2019 Sydney Theatre Awards.

It won both the Victorian Prize for Literature and the Victorian Premier's Prize for Drama at the 2020 Victorian Premier's Literary Awards, with theatre director Eamon Flack credited as associate writer.

In April 2020 Counting and Cracking won the Nick Enright Prize for Playwriting at the New South Wales Premier's Literary Awards.

== Other works by the playwright ==
Shakthi, who is co-founder and co-director of Kurinji theatre company in Sydney, has written other plays, written for film, and created video installations. Shakthi was co-founder and lead artistic consultant at Co-Curious From 2018 to 2021, sister company to CuriousWorks. CuriousWorks is a Western Sydney community arts organisation established as a start-up "committed to telling diverse community stories" in 2005 by S. Shakthidharan, where he was artistic director until 2018.

He wrote and directed Stay, which premiered at the 2022 Sydney Festival. His 2023 play The Jungle and the Sea, also co-written and directed with Eamon Flack, was produced by Belvoir to good reviews and won several awards. He adapted Zana Fraillon's novel The Bone Sparrow for stage, which as toured UK in 2022 with Pilot Theatre.

Screen work includes the feature film Riz (2015), which he co-wrote, directed, and produced, with Guido Gonzalez. He co-executive produced, with CuriousWorks and Cine Esperanza, the documentary Heart of the Fight: The Story of Dick Blair, a 30-minute documentary about Aboriginal pastor Richard Phillips, aka Dick Blair, Australian middleweight champion. Blair was a key figure in the establishment of Aboriginal-run social housing development The Block in Redfern, Sydney. He was also co-executive producer, with Lyn Norfor and Blake Ayshford, the 2022 anthology film Here Out West. He was a co-writer, with Nicole Reddy and Mithila Gupta, of the 2024 TV romance drama series Four Years Later.

Other work includes VR project Laka (2018, Casula Powerhouse); AV experience The Other Journey (2011, 2013); dance/documentary work Zameen (2013); and hybrid theatre/dance work The Migrant Project (from 2005).

His memoir, Gather Up Your World in One Long Breath, published in 2025, was shortlisted for the Nonfiction prize at the 2026 Prime Minister's Literary Awards.
