= The Second Woman (play) =

2016 play by Nat Randall and Anna Breckon

The Second Woman is a twenty-four-hour performance piece devised by Nat Randall and Anna Breckon, first performed in 2016. A female-identifying performer repeats a scene based loosely on John Cassavetes' Opening Night one hundred times. The film Opening Night (1977) is a film about a play called The Second Woman. The importance of repetition has been noted by a number of writers. The dialogue for Randall and Breckon's The Second Woman is largely taken from Cassavete's film.

The 24-hour performance consists of a short scene of roughly 10-15 minutes repeated 100 times. In this scene the main character Virginia plays with one hundred male-identifying performers (playing the role of Marty), who are mostly not professional actors. They responded to a call out. There are interesting accounts of the experience of the participating.

In its first performances, from 2016 to 2019, Randall played the central character, Virginia. Since then, different actors have taken on the role as the piece has toured internationally, including in Taiwan, Italy, New York, and London.

Teresa Tan argues that the performance enables us to see types of masculine behaviour. She cites Randall’s remarks : ‘The thing about repetition is that it presents a generic quality of a particular mode of masculine emotion ... The work is very much looking at gendered conventions of emotion, so really unpacking a performance of masculinity and femininity within a queer lens'

== Touring history ==
- 2016–2019 Nat Randall (Virginia), at various locations in Australia
- 2018 Kaohsiung, Taiwan with Zhu Zhi-Ying
- 2019 Toronto, Canada with Laara Sadiq
- 2019 Brooklyn Academy of Music, Brooklyn, New York with Alia Shawkat
- 2023 The Young Vic, London with Ruth Wilson
- 2024 Onassis Stegi, Athens with Stefania Goulioti
- 2024 Holland Festival 25, with Georgina Verbaan
- 2025 Royal Palace Court Theatre, Napoli with Euridice Axen
- 2025 Cork Opera House, Cork with Eileen Walsh
- 2026 Malta Festival Poznań Poland with Magdalena Cielecka

== Reception ==
In 2019, The Second Woman was nominated for a Helpmann Award.
