= Natalie Aroyan =

Australian-Armenian operatic soprano

- Aroyan preparing for Handa Opera in Millthorpe 2025
- Born: Australia
- Citizenship: Australian
- Occupation: Operatic soprano
- Years active: 2008–present
- Known for: Soprano at Opera Australia
- Website: nataliearoyan.com

Natalie Aroyan is an Australian opera soprano and a principal with Opera Australia.

== Early life and education ==
Aroyan grew up in Sydney, Australia. Her parents were born in Egypt and Syria, both of Armenian descent. She studied business and information technology at the Australian Catholic University. Aroyan trained with mezzo-soprano Liliya Ovchiyan, before attending the Sydney Conservatorium of Music in 2014.

== Performances ==
In 2013, she began performing with Opera Australia, where she is a principal.

Her roles have included:

- Mimì in La bohème at the Sydney Opera House (2013)
- Amelia Grimaldi in Simon Boccanegra (2016)
- Annina in La traviata
- Micaëla in Carmen
- Odabella in Verdi's Attila at the Sydney Opera House (2020)
- the title role in Verdi's Aida
- Eva in Die Meistersinger von Nürnberg
- Title role in Adriana Lecouvreur (2023)
- The Foreign Princess/Duchess in Dvořák's Rusalka for Opera Australia (2025)
- Amelia in Verdi's Un ballo in maschera at Handa Opera at Millthorpe (2026)

In 2014, Aroyan wrote and directed her own production, An Armenian Journey, an opera about the Armenian genocide.

== Critical reception ==
The Sydney Morning Herald, writing about Aroyan's 2022 performance in Verdi's Attila at the Sydney Opera House, said "Aroyan sang the demanding role of [Attila's] nemesis Odabella with a passionate sound of high drama. She spanned an impressively wide range [...] giving sharp-elbowed edge to fierce lower notes, soaring over the quintet and chorus in Act II, navigating the vocal span with flexible agility".

Of her performance as Aida at the Queensland Performing Arts Centre in 2023, ArtsHub said "As the Ethiopian Princess and slave, Aida, Natalie Aroyan delivers a finely crafted emotional and impressive performance. Her soprano rises strongly and she has a warm timbre and luscious colour in her voice. She is at her best in her two arias [...] and in her scenes with her lover".

In 2023, Aroyan stepped in, at short notice, for the indisposed Ermonela Jaho at the opening night performance to sing the title role in Adriana Lecouvreur at the Sydney Opera House. Of her performance, the Canberra City News said "Natalie Aroyan was simply magnificent as the diva Lecouvreur. She was surprisingly confident, given the circumstances, and acted with attack and confidence, delivering her declamatory opening lines with flair then captivated with her lustrous soprano in the opera’s best-known aria".

== Awards ==
- Harding Miller Foundation Opera Scholarship 2019
- Herald Sun Aria Competition – Winner (2008)
- Italian Opera Foundation Award – Winner (2009)
- Opera Foundation New York Competition – Winner (2008)
