= Legs on the Wall =

Australian physical theatre company

Legs on the Wall is an Australian physical theatre company based in Sydney. Formed in 1984, Legs on the Wall's performances combine acrobatics with dance, circus skills, and technology.

== History ==
The company was founded in 1984 in Sydney. It began with two female and two male performers, who wished to uphold the concept of gender equality within their group.

Legs on the Wall's initial motives were to take the interconnections between story/theatre and circus that were emerging in Australia at the time, and further develop them, by forming a strong relationship between physical performance and Australian cultural identity. In the early days, performances were geared towards political activism. One such show, Bruce cuts off his hand addressed workplace accidents, and premiered in Newcastle, an industrial area.

== Description ==
Legs on the Wall creates aerial outdoor shows and theatre productions, performing within Australia and internationally.

The company embraces a "collective process" of collaboration amongst the performers.

== People ==
Celia White was a member of community theatre group Desperate Measures in Perth before going on to work with Harpies Bizarre and Legs on the Wall in Sydney, and later Vulcana Women's Circus in Queensland].

== Notable performances ==
Legs on the Wall performed at the 2000 Summer Olympics in Sydney and the 2008 Summer Olympics in Beijing. They also performed at the London 2012 Cultural Olympiad, an artistic format associated with the London Olympics.

== Recognition ==
Legs on the Wall received the 1994 Sidney Myer Performing Arts Award for a group.

Its production On the Case was named Best Visual or Physical Theatre Production at the 2006 Helpmann Awards.
