= John Frost (producer) =

Australian theatrical producer

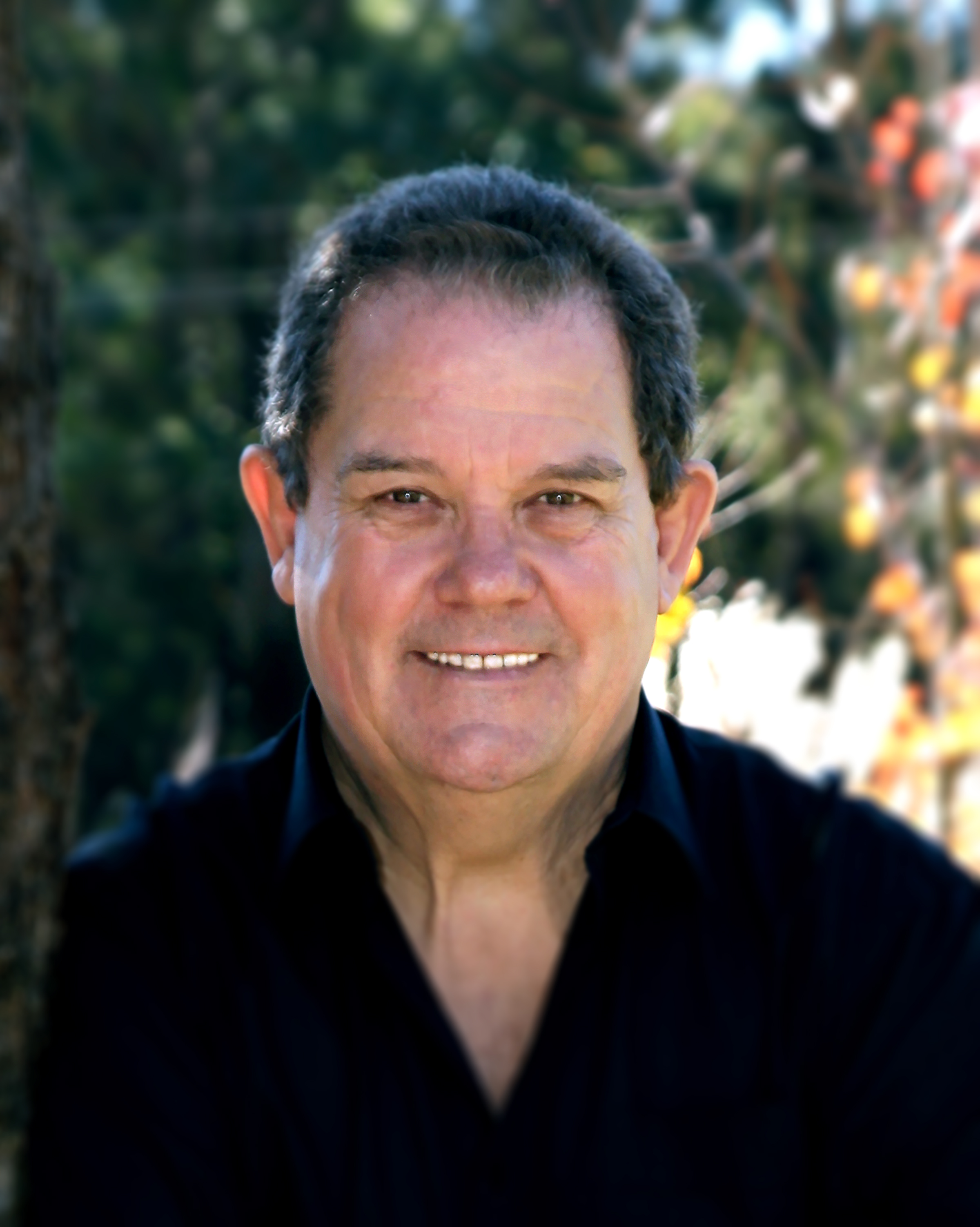
John Frost by Tony Sheffield

John Edward Frost (AM) (born 30 September 1952) is an Australian theatrical stage impresario. He is co-founder and CEO of Sydney-based production company The Gordon Frost Organisation (GFO). In December 2020, he sold the company to Crossroads Live Company (CXL) but continues in the role of CEO.

== Early life ==
John Edward Frost was educated at the Ferryden Park Primary School, and the Croydon Technical School. His father, Albert Edward was an Adelaide waterside worker and his mother, Louie Dorcas (née Oldfield) was a housewife and an officer cleaner. Frost grew-up in Adelaide where he regularly staged backyard entertainments with his doting Aunt, Mary, who despite her serious speech stutter played Eliza to his Henry Higgins, miming to the My Fair Lady cast album. His childhood was influenced by American television and Hollywood movies at Saturday afternoon cinema sessions. From the moment he saw a production of The Great Waltz at Her Majesty's Theatre in Adelaide he knew what he wanted to do with his life. A short stint in his teens with amateur theatre (he was in the ensemble of a local production of Show Boat) revealed, to his disappointment, that he was more suited to working backstage than performing.

== Career beginnings ==
His first backstage jobs in the theatre were as a props assistant on Tibor Rudas' production of Snow White and The Seven Dwarfs, and a dresser on the JC Williamson's tour of the stage musical Mame starring the Broadway actor, Gaylea Byrne, at Her Majesty's Theatre Adelaide.

Consequently, he was hired as a dresser for the remainder of the Australian tour. While he was guaranteed employment in each of the cities they played, the management required him to meet his own travelling costs to each of the destinations.

His father, Albert, died while John was travelling with the Mame company on the Transcontinental Train across the Nullarbor Plain to Perth. While the train was not permitted legally to stop to allow him to disembark, the drivers, travelling in opposite directions, agreed to pass slowly enough to allow John to jump from one train carriage to the other. Following his father's funeral he returned to the production of Mame.

Offered the job of Wardrobe Master on the Aztec Services’ production of the stage musical Canterbury Tales at the old Theatre Royal, Castlereagh Street, he went, with his mother's blessing, to live and work in Sydney.

From there he began his rise through the ranks of the theatre, working a succession of administrative, production, and creative roles: usher, dresser, stagehand, front-of-house, assistant theatre manager, programme seller, wardrobe master, general office assistant to Kenn Brodziak, party booking assistant for Harry M Miller Attractions, production assistant, assistant stage manager, stage manager, stage director, company manager, actors’ agent, artistic director/general manager Marion Street Theatre, Killara, and Kinselas - Darlinghurst, Sydney; and international producer.

== Establishment of the Gordon Frost Organisation ==
In 1983, Frost, together with his business partner, the late Ashley Gordon, co-founded the Gordon Frost Organisation. They negotiated a lease on the Footbridge Theatre inside the University of Sydney campus. At the time they were the youngest theatrical producers in Australia. Their first production, and a financial success, was stage play ‘night Mother starring June Salter and Jill Perryman. It turned a profit of $70,000; Agnes of God starring Diane Cilento and Carol Raye. Women Behind Bars (starring June Bronhill) was not a box-office success and it lost all of their previous profits. Other productions included a revival of The Venetian Twins starring Drew Forsythe, Tony Sheldon and Tony Taylor. Their first musical venture, Jerry's Girls, with a star-cast including Debbie Byrne, Marcia Hines and Jeanne Little, toured Australia.

In 1989, their first major musical production was Big River: The Adventures of Huckleberry Finn starring Cameron Daddo and John Bell. Ashley Gordon died, 1989, aged 28, from AIDS related HIV, only months after the opening of Big River at Her Majesty's Theatre, Sydney. Big River toured Australia and turned a healthy profit. In memory of Ashley, the Gordon part of the company name was retained.

In Australia, GFO, has produced, co-produced, managed, and invested in productions with other leading international producers.

== Gordon Frost Productions ==
Known affectionately as Frosty the Showman, Frost has been a major producer of musical theatre in Australia since 1989 when GFO moved into large scale productions.

Following Ashley Gordon's death, and a period of personal uncertainty, John continued with GFO and produced a string of successful shows, beginning with The King and I directed by Christopher Renshaw and starring Hayley Mills which toured Australia for 38-weeks; played the West End (starring Elaine Paige); toured the UK (Stefanie Powers); Broadway (starring Donna Murphy); toured the United States (Hayley Mills and Marie Osmond). The Broadway production of The King and I won the Tony Award for Best Revival of a Musical.

In the wake of the successes of Big River and The King and I, GFO staged a series of major musicals in Australia: South Pacific, Hello, Dolly! with Jill Perryman and Warren Mitchell; The Secret Garden with Anthony Warlow, Philip Quast, Marina Prior and June Salter; Smokey Joe's Cafe, and Crazy For You.

In 1996, he formed a business partnership with SEL, and co-produced Grease – The Arena Spectacular!; The Sound of Music starring Lisa McCune and John Waters; Man of La Mancha with Anthony Warlow. GFO subsequently co-presented the first Australian revival tour of The Phantom of the Opera, starring Anthony Warlow. It sold 950,000 tickets over 21 months in six cities. GFO was an original producer of Priscilla, Queen of the Desert and The Book of Mormon.

Over a 40-year career, John Frost (GFO) has staged almost 200 productions in Australia (a combination of original American/UK, or original Australian stagings), the UK(West End and touring), the US (Broadway and touring), and the Asia Pacific.

Australian productions include: Annie, A Funny Thing Happened on the Way to the Forum, ONCE, We Will Rock You, Dream Lover: The Bobby Darin Musical, The Wizard of Oz, Charlie and the Chocolate Factory, Shrek, Secret Garden, The Rocky Horror Show, Grease, Dirty Dancing, Doctor Zhivago, Hairspray, Wicked, Cabaret, and The Producers starring Reg Livermore and Tom Burlinson.

He co-produced the London West End productions of The Bodyguard; and Blithe Spirit starring Dame Angela Lansbury as Madame Arcati. In the US (Broadway) he co-produced An Act of God, Exit the King with Geoffrey Rush and Susan Sarandon; and Fiddler on the Roof.

Jointly with Opera Australia, he co-produced South Pacific, The King and I with Lisa McCune, Anything Goes, and My Fair Lady, directed by Dame Julie Andrews with designs by Sir Cecil Beaton, and starring Alex Jennings/Charles Edwards, Anna O’Byrne, Reg Livermore, and Robyn Nevin; and Evita starring Tina Arena; Charlie and The Chocolate Factory; Shrek, and The Book of Mormon.

John has presented a number of plays, including the Tony Award-winning Art starring Tom Conti; the National Theatre of Great Britain’s celebrated production of JB Priestley’s An Inspector Calls. An Ideal Husband starring Googie Withers, John McCallum, Stephanie Beacham, Nicky Henson, John Waters, and Penny Cook.

At the Theatre Royal Haymarket London, he presented Oscar Wilde's Lady Windermere's Fan starring Vanessa Redgrave and Joely Richardson. This production, directed by Sir Peter Hall, marked the end of the glittering stage careers of Googie Withers and John McCallum.

The Australian tour of Driving Miss Daisy starring Dame Angela Lansbury and James Earl Jones; Calendar Girls starring Cornelia Frances, Lorraine Bayly, Amanda Muggleton, Rhonda Burchmore, Anna Lee, Jean Kitson, Rachel Berger, David Downer.

GFO and SEL co-presented a number of shows, including the arena production of Grease starring John Farnham. He co-produced Sir Peter Hall's acclaimed production of Oscar Wilde's An Ideal Husband, starring Googie Withers, John McCallum, Stephanie Beacham, John Waters, Nicky Henson, Penny Cook, Josephine Byrnes which toured Australia.

He produced a revival (Sydney, Melbourne, Brisbane) of the National Theatre of Great Britain's celebrated production of J.B. Priestley's, An Inspector Calls; and the Australian tours of Mandy Patinkin, together with fellow theatre icon, Patti LuPone, and Met Opera and Broadway star, Nathan Gunn; and Hollywood movie star and cabaret legend, Debbie Reynolds.

John Frost, in partnership with The Really Useful Company Asia Pacific, produced the first Australian revival touring season of The Phantom of the Opera starring Anthony Warlow as the Phantom, a role which he created in the original Cameron Mackintosh Australian production.

In 2010 he produced Dame Julie Andrews in the concert event, The Gift of Music, at the O2 Arena.

Frost produced the Australian tours of the West End hit Calendar Girls, Fame the Musical; and the Australian and Asian tour of Chicago; Doctor Zhivago and the Broadway blockbuster, Wicked. Other productions include: Annie; Geoffrey Rush in A Funny Thing Happened on the Way to the Forum; the Opera Australia production of South Pacific; Legally Blonde the Musical, Grease, in several incarnations; and The Rocky Horror Show.

He presented An Evening With Julie Andrews and Nicholas Hammond (Frederick in the film of The Sound of Music); Driving Miss Daisy starring Dame Angela Lansbury, James Earl Jones, and Boyd Gaines; both of which toured Australia.

On London's West End the hit shows The Bodyguard; and Noël Coward's stage play, Blithe Spirit, again with Dame Angela Lansbury, and Charles Edwards and Janie Dee. The critics raved, unanimously, and the show played to capacity business for the entire run.

Other Australian productions include the return tour of Wicked, The King and I with Opera Australia; and Once with the Melbourne Theatre Company.

John was presented with the JC Williamson Lifetime Achievement Award. He was awarded the Medal of the Order of Australia (OAM); and, subsequently, Member of Order of Australia (AM) - for services to the theatre. Internationally, GFO has won two Tony Awards for musicals on the Broadway, and received high acclaim for a variety of local and international productions, including the Rodgers and Hammerstein productions of The King and I (1991) and South Pacific (1993); The Secret Garden (1995); The Producers (2003); Wicked (2008). In 1996, the Australian set designer, Brian Thomson, and costume designer, Roger Kirk, won Tony Awards for the Broadway season of The King and I.

In November 2020 GFO mounted a production of Pippin at the Lyric Theatre Sydney. It was the first major musical since the onset of the COVID-19 pandemic and the Government ordered temporary cessation of Australian live theatre performances.

== Period of Co-Production with SEL ==
In 1998, Sports & Entertainment Limited SEL bought 50% of the GFO. Together with John Frost, James Erskine David Coe, expanded the notion of entertainment, creating arena spectaculars. Grease: The Arena Spectacular! broke all box office records for an arena event in Australia.

In 1999 The Main Event featuring Olivia Newton-John, Anthony Warlow and John Farnham toured to both critical and financial success. The British actor, Tom Conti, starred in a production of the Tony Award-winning play Art.

The Sound of Music, starring Lisa McCune, ran for 36-weeks around Australia, grossing $48 million. It ran at 96% capacity for most of its season, peaking at 101% where, in Melbourne, they sold standing-room during the show's final weeks. In London, The King and I played at the Palladium, starring Elaine Paige, and played for two years and broke all existing records for advance sales at the London Palladium.

Annie starring Anthony Warlow; The Wizard of Oz, Grease: The Mega Musical; Federation Outback Spectacular, were financial success. Man of La Mancha and Footloose proved to be financially disappointing. An arena production of Tim Rice's Musical Spectacular - starring Anthony Warlow, Australian singers, Kate Ceberano and Iva Davies, and the Australian pop group, Bachelor Girl, lost approximately $500,000.

The co-production agreement lasted until 2005.

== Sale of Gordon Frost Organisation ==
On 9 December 2020, Crossroads Live (CXL), a global live entertainment company, with principal offices in Los Angeles and London, announced the acquisition of the Sydney-based Gordon Frost Organisation.

In acquiring The GFO, CXL was immediately positioned as the first truly global company for touring musical theatre production, and as a leading production company in Australia, one of the most important theatre markets in the world.

Further, in securing a base of operations in Sydney, CXL was strategically placed to extend its market leadership as the foremost provider of touring theatrical productions in the key growth markets of Southeast Asia, the Middle East, India, and China.

As the parent company of David Ian Productions (UK) and The Gordon Frost Organisation (Australia), CXL, and its affiliates, are well place to deliver iconic and original musical theatre productions to audiences around the world.

== The GFO Collection Holdings – Victorian Arts Centre Melbourne ==
The Gordon Frost Organisation (GFO) Collection, donated by Frost in 2001, is more than 30-boxes of archives of stage management records, contractual and business correspondence and company documents; and 20 costumes from majoring touring productions from 1987 to 1999 including: The King and I (1991–96), Hello, Dolly! (1994), Grease (1995), South Pacific (1995), An Ideal Husband (1997) and The Sound of Music (1999).

== The Success of The King and I ==
=== 1991 and 2014 ===
The GFO 1991 production of The King And I, starring Hayley Mills, was an Australian and international triumph, scooping several Tony Awards after the production transferred to Broadway with Donna Murphy as Mrs Anna. The show had not been produced in Australia for 20 years. It was a major coup for the GFO and opened many international doors.

President and Executive Director of the Rodgers and Hammerstein Organization, Ted Chapin, said: “John Frost's production of The King And I is a classic example of taking a theatrical risk – a risk that ended up paying-off better than anyone could have imagined. John's resume didn't necessarily warrant him being handed the rights to one of Rodgers & Hammerstein's best shows, but he was enthusiastic and spirited – characteristics I am happy to say he still possesses today – and persuasive. Seeing the production in Melbourne was one of the most exciting nights of my life, and that started the worldwide roll-out which, of course, included a triumphant run on Broadway. I am so looking forward to seeing it again, and Opera Australia is the perfect modern partner.”

The Gordon Frost Organisation (GFO) production of The King and I on Broadway(1996), won the coveted Tony Award for ‘Best Revival of a Musical’, as well as the Drama Desk, and New York Outer Critics’ Circle, Awards.

A West End production followed (2002), with Elaine Paige playing Anna Leonowens.

The 2014 production, a remount of the 1991 version, starring Lisa McCune as Anna Leonowens, and Teddy Tahu Rhodes/Jason Lee Scott/Lou Diamond Phillips as The King, was equally successful. It played Brisbane, Melbourne and Sydney.

The years with Harry M Miller and Kenn Brodziak were his most formative years, and was where he learnt everything from tearing tickets, to group sales, and stage management. While technology may have altered the methodology, the basics remain the same.

== Awards and nominations ==
=== Helpmann Awards ===
The Helpmann Awards is an awards show, celebrating live entertainment and performing arts in Australia, presented by industry group Live Performance Australia (LPA) since 2001. In 2014, Frostreceived the JC Williamson Award, the LPA's highest honour, for their life's work in live performance.

Year	Nominee / work	Award	Result
2014	Himself	JC Williamson Award	awarded
