= Performing Lines =

Performing Lines is an Australian performing arts producer and presenter.

It was established in 1990 as a successor to the Australian Content department of the Australian Elizabethan Theatre Trust, it was established by actress Wendy Blacklock, who also served as general manager.

Performing Lines presents national and international tours of innovative Australian performing arts.

== Productions (selected) ==
- The Theft of Sita
- The Seven Stages of Grieving
- Shadows and Objects for Meditation
- Same, Same but Different
- Wolf Lullaby
