= 9th Helpmann Awards =

2009 live performance awards in Australia

- Date: 27 July 2009
- Location: Sydney Opera House
- Hosted by: Jonathan Biggins and Julia Zemiro

Television/radio coverage
- Network: Bio.

The 2009 Helpmann Awards for live performance in Australia were presented on 27 July 2009 at the Sydney Opera House. The ceremony was hosted by Jonathan Biggins and Julia Zemiro and was broadcast live on Bio. (Foxtel's biography channel).

== Nominees and winners ==
Winners are listed in bold type.

=== Theatre ===
Best Play	Best Direction of a Play
**War of the Roses – Sydney Theatre Company in association with the Sydney Festival and Perth International Arts Festival**; Women of Troy – Sydney Theatre Company; Ivanov – Katona Jozsef Theatre presented by Sydney Festival; The Gatz – Sydney Opera House and Brisbane Powerhouse	**Benedict Andrews – War of the Roses**; Barrie Kosky – Women of Troy; Peter Evans – Blackbird (Melbourne Theatre Company); Neil Armfield – Scorched (Company B)
Best Female Actor in a Play	Best Male Actor in a Play
**Robyn Nevin – Women of Troy**; Pamela Rabe – War of the Roses; Alison Bell – Blackbird; Cate Blanchett – War of the Roses	**Ben Winspear – Baghdad Wedding (Company B)**; Colin Moody – Antigone (ThinIce); Greg Stone – Blackbird; Robert Menzies – War of the Roses
Best Female Actor in a Supporting Role in a Play	Best Male Actor in a Supporting Role in a Play
**Marta Dusseldorp – War of the Roses**; Christen O'Leary – Goodbye Vaudeville Charlie Mudd (Arena Theatre Company and Malthouse Theatre); Bojana Novakovic – Woyzeck (Malthouse Theatre); Yael Stone – Scorched	**Ewen Leslie – War of the Roses**; Grant Piro – Realism (Melbourne Theatre Company); Jimi Bani – Yibiyung (Company B); Mark Jones – Goodbye Vaudeville Charlie Mudd

=== Musicals ===
Best Musical
**Wicked – Marc Platt, David Stone, Universal Pictures, The Araca Group, Jon B. Platt and John Frost**; Shane Warne: The Musical – Token Events; My Fair Lady – Opera Australia; Monty Python's Spamalot – Ozalot
Best Direction of a Musical	Best Choreography in a Musical
**Lisa Leguillou – Wicked**; Stuart Maunder – My Fair Lady; Geordie Brookman – Metro Street (State Theatre Company of South Australia, Arts Asia Pacific & Power Arts); Neil Gooding – Gutenberg! The Musical! (Neil Gooding Productions, Ian Stenlake & James Millar)	**Wayne Cilento – Wicked**; Gideon Obarzanek – Shane Warne: The Musical; Nathan M. Wright – Gutenberg! The Musical!; Jo Stone – Metro Street
Best Female Actor in a Musical	Best Male Actor in a Musical
**Sharon Millerchip – Chicago**; Amanda Harrison – Wicked; Lucy Durack – Wicked; Lucinda Shaw (as the Lady of the Lake) – Monty Python's Spamalot	**Bille Brown (as King Arthur) – Monty Python's Spamalot**; Eddie Perfect – Shane Warne: The Musical; Todd McKenney – Priscilla Queen of the Desert – the Musical; Reg Livermore – My Fair Lady
Best Female Actor in a Supporting Role in a Musical	Best Male Actor in a Supporting Role in a Musical
**Nancye Hayes – My Fair Lady**; Ursula Yovich – Jerry Springer: The Opera; Gina Riley – Chicago; Maggie Kirkpatrick – Wicked	**Rob Guest – Wicked**; Damien Bermingham – Chicago; Derek Metzger – Monty Python's Spamalot; Robert Grubb – My Fair Lady

=== Opera and Classical Music ===
Best Opera	Best Direction of an Opera
**Billy Budd – Opera Australia**; The Coronation of Poppea – Victorian Opera; The Navigator – Brisbane Festival and Melbourne International Arts Festival; Aida – West Australian Opera	**Neil Armfield – Billy Budd**; Chris Kohn – The Children's Bach; Kate Cherry – The Coronation of Poppea; Graeme Murphy – Aida
Best Female Performer in an Opera	Best Male Performer in an Opera
**Tiffany Speight – The Coronation of Poppea**; Rachelle Durkin – A Flowering Tree; Susan Bullock – Lady Macbeth of Mtsensk; Cheryl Barker – The Makropoulos Secret	**John Wegner – Billy Budd**; Philip Langridge – Billy Budd; Jonathan Summers – Otello; David Hansen – The Coronation of Poppea
Best Female Performer in a Supporting Role in an Opera	Best Male Performer in a Supporting Role in an Opera
**Dominica Matthews – Lady Macbeth of Mtsensk**; Emma Pearson – The Magic Flute; Sally Wilson – The Coronation of Poppea; Fiona Campbell – The Marriage of Figaro	**John Wegner – Lady Macbeth of Mtsensk**; Kanen Breen – Lady Macbeth of Mtsensk; Andrew Foote – The Barber of Seville; Luke Gabbedy – The Marriage of Figaro
Best Symphony Orchestra Concert	Best Chamber and Instrumental Ensemble Concert
**Perth International Arts Festival/WA Opera/West Australian Symphony Orchestra – A Flowering Tree**; Adelaide Festival Centre's Symphonic Program and The Australian Youth Orchestra – Beethoven Festival: Piano Concerto No. 5 in E major, Op. 73 (Emperor), Symphony No. 5 in C minor, Op. 67; Australian Brandenburg Orchestra – Mozart Requiem; Australian Chamber Orchestra – Euphoric	**Adelaide Festival Centre's OzAsia Festival and Soundstream Contemporary Music Ensemble – Ecstatic Dances**; Musica Viva Australia – Eggner Trio; Perth International Arts Festival – Theatre of Voices, The Little Match Girl Passion; Perth International Arts Festival – Pacifica Quartet, Black Angels
Best Individual Classical Music Performance
**Herbert Schuch – The Beethoven Festival**; Genevieve Lacey – 4 Seasons; Diana Doherty – Mozart, Beethoven & Schubert; Kolja Blacher – Mendelssohn Violin Concerto; Lisa Gasteen – The Valkyrie

=== Dance and Physical Theatre ===
Best Ballet or Dance Work	Best Visual or Physical Theatre Production
**Mathinna – Bangarra Dance Theatre**; Graeme Murphy's Firebird – The Australian Ballet; we unfold – Sydney Dance Company; Two Faced Bastard – Melbourne International Arts Festival and Chunky Move	**Compagnie Philippe Genty – Lands End – Arts Projects Australia**; Cinderella on Ice – Lunchbox Theatrical Productions, Imperial Ice Stars, Tony Mercer, David Atkins Enterprises and Vladislav Olenin; 30th Birthday Bash – Circus Oz; At First Sight – National Institute of Circus Arts
Best Female Dancer in a Dance or Physical Theatre Production	Best Male Dancer in a Dance or Physical Theatre Production
**Lana Jones – Graeme Murphy's Firebird**; Michelle Heaven – Two Faced Bastard; Annabel Knight – 360° (Sydney Dance Company); Juliette Barton – we unfold	**Antony Hamilton – Two Faced Bastard**; Bradley Chatfield – Sid's Waltzing Masquerade (Sydney Dance Company); Reed Luplau – Sid's Waltzing Masquerade; Byron Perry – Corridor (Lucy Guerin Inc and Melbourne International Arts Festival)
Best Choreography in a Dance or Physical Theatre Production
**Stephen Page – Mathinna**; Phillip Adams – Axeman Lullaby (BalletLab); Graeme Murphy – Firebird; Rafael Bonachela – we unfold

=== Contemporary Music ===
Best Australian Contemporary Concert	Best Contemporary Music Festival
**WA, Perth International Arts Festival, NSW, Sydney Opera House Trust – Geoffrey Gurrumul Yunupingu**; One Louder and The Harbour Agency – Paul Kelly More Songs from the South; Chugg Entertainment – Morning of the Earth (Film and Music Live in Concert); The Frontier Touring Company – KylieX2008	**Vivian Lees and Ken West – Big Day Out 2009**; Domestic Music Concepts – Homebake; Virgin Management & Michael Coppel – V Festival (Australia); Queenscliff Music Festival Inc. – Queenscliff Music Festival
Best International Contemporary Music Concert
**The Frontier Touring Company – Leonard Cohen World Tour 2009**; Vivian Lees and Ken West – Neil Young; Presented by Sydney Festival – Grace Jones; Chugg Entertainment – Coldplay Viva la Vida Tour

=== Other ===
Best Presentation for Children	Best Regional Touring Production
**The Flying Fruit Fly Circus – The Promise**; The Arts Centre – Angelina's Star Performance performed by the English National Ballet; Windmill and Brink Productions – The Clockwork Forest; Bell Shakespeare – Just Macbeth!	**Fiery Angel Ltd and Kay & McLean Productions Pty Ltd – Alfred Hitchcock's The 39 Steps**; Patch Theatre Company – Emily Loves to Bounce; Spare Parts Puppet Theatre and Country Arts WA – The Arrival; Taikoz – The Gathering
Best Comedy Performer
**Tim Minchin – Ready For This?**; Adam Hills – Inflatable; Judith Lucy – Judith Lucy's Not Getting Any Younger; Julia Morris – Don't You Know Who I Used to Be?

=== Industry Awards ===
Best New Australian Work
**Eddie Perfect – Shane Warne: The Musical**; Andy Griffiths – Just Macbeth!; Back to Back Theatre with The Necks – FOOD COURT; Matthew Robinson – Metro Street
Best Original Score	Best Music Direction
**David Page – Mathinna**; Liza Lim – The Navigator; The Necks – Chris Abrahams, Tony Buck & Lloyd Swanton – FOOD COURT; Stephen Schwartz – Wicked	**Richard Hickox – Billy Budd**; Martin Lowe – Jerry Springer The Opera; Matthew Carey – Metro Street; Nicolette Fraillon – Firebird and other legends
Best Scenic Design	Best Costume Design
**Eugene Lee – Wicked**; Bruce Gladwin, Mark Cuthbertson & Rhian Hinkley – Food Court; Brian Thomson – Billy Budd; Robert Cousins – War of the Roses	**Susan Hilferty – Wicked**; Roger Kirk – My Fair Lady; Michelle Jank – Sid's Waltzing Masquerade; Tess Schofield – The Wonderful World of Dissocia
Best Lighting Design	Best Sound Design
**Nick Schlieper – War of the Roses**; Geoff Cobham – Metro Street; Nigel Levings – Billy Budd; Kenneth Posner – Wicked	**Max Lyandvert – War of the Roses**; David Franzke – Venus & Adonis; Tony Meola – Wicked; George Gorga – we unfold
Best Special Event
**The Frontier Touring Company, Chugg Entertainment, IMC & Mark Pope Music – Sound Relief**; Sydney Festival – Dawn Chorus; Sydney Festival – Festival First Night; Melbourne International Arts Festival in association with Arts House – Hidden Republic
