= Alex Rathgeber =

Australian actor and singer (born 1982)

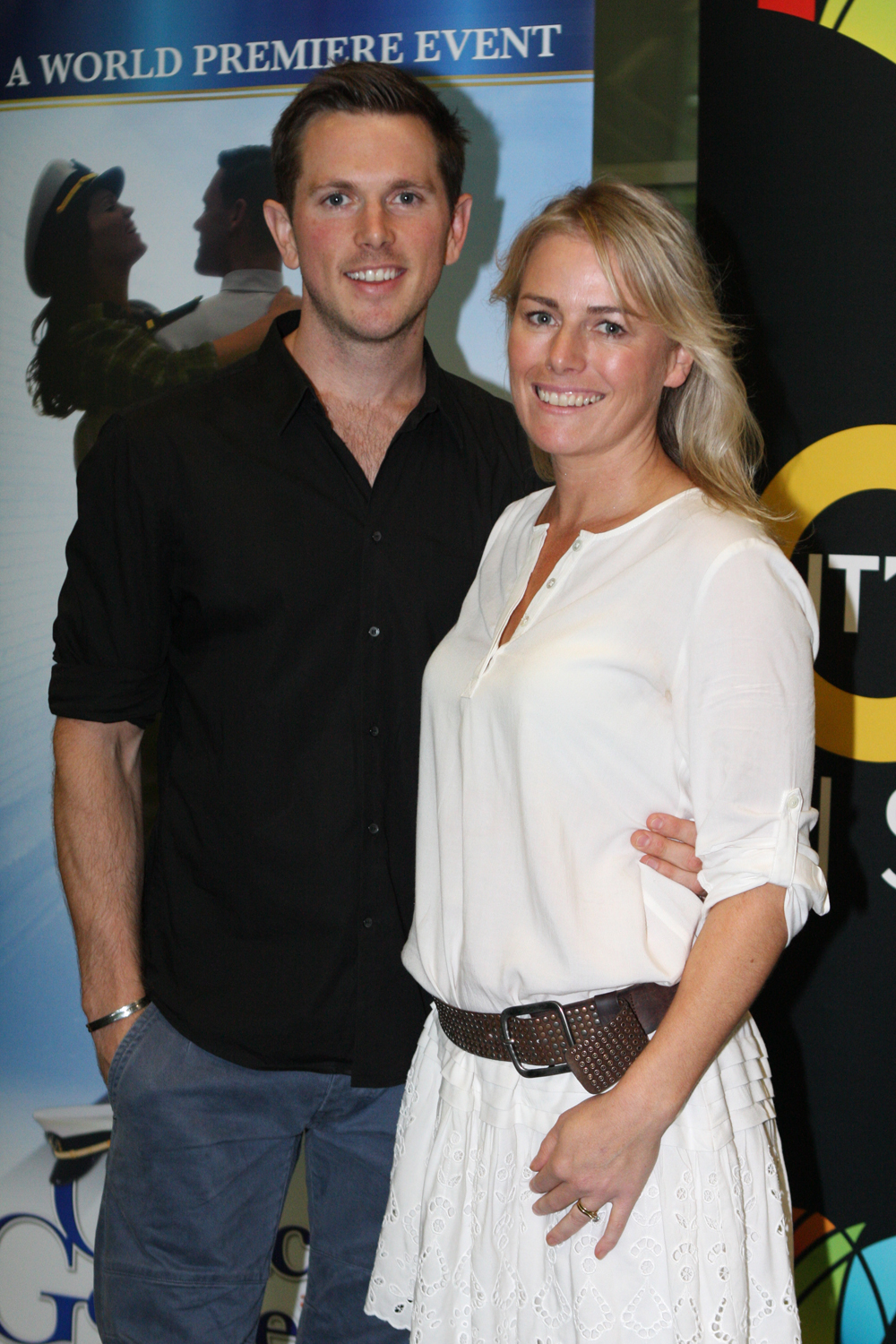
- Rathgeber (left) with Kate Kendall at a rehearsal and performance of An Officer and a Gentleman in 2012
- Born: 17 November 1982 (age 44); Horsham, Victoria, Australia
- Education: Xavier College. Melbourne; Western Australian Academy of Performing Arts (WAAPA)
- Occupations: Actor & Singer
- Years active: 2004–present
- Television: Rush; Miss Fisher's Murder Mysteries; Winners & Losers
- Website: www.alexrathgeber.com

Alex Wilson Rathgeber (born 17 November 1982) is an Australian actor and singer, perhaps best known for his Helpmann Award-winning performance as Billy Crocker in Anything Goes. More recently he appeared as the Tin Man in Andrew Lloyd Webber's revival of The Wizard of Oz.

In the United Kingdom, Rathgeber played the role of Raoul in the 21st Anniversary cast of The Phantom of the Opera in the West End. Alex identifies as gay.

== Early life ==
Alexander Wilson Rathgeber was born in Horsham, Victoria, and raised on a farm by real estate agent father, David, and primary school teacher and real estate agent mother, Katherine. He has two older siblings, Olivia and Nicholas. At 15-years-old, Rathgeber commenced as a boarder at Xavier College in Melbourne, where he became vice-captain of the school in his final year.

== Training ==
Immediately following his year 12, Rathgeber was admitted into the world-renowned Western Australian Academy of Performing Arts (WAAPA). Graduating in 2003 with a Bachelor of Arts (Music Theatre).

== Theatre ==
Rathgeber made his professional debut in supporting roles such as Gremio in Kiss Me, Kate and Sacha in Fiddler on the Roof alongside Topol in the role of Tevye. Rathgeber was cast by director George Ogilvie in his first principal role, Lancelot in Camelot for Melbourne's The Production Company. He starred alongside Katrina Retallick, Scott Irwin, Melissa Madden Gray and Dennis Olsen. Soon after, he was cast opposite Silvie Paladino in the role of Billy in the new Australian production, Sideshow Alley. In 2007 he moved to London where he landed the role of Raoul in Andrew Lloyd Webber's The Phantom of the Opera in the West End, with Ramin Karimloo playing the Phantom.

Invited to return to Australia to appear in Mame as the nephew Patrick to Rhonda Burchmore's Mame, he then played the part of Tony opposite Esther Hannaford in The Boyfriend, before being cast by director Simon Phillips to play the groom Robert in Melbourne Theatre Company's production of The Drowsy Chaperone, alongside Geoffrey Rush, Christie Whelan Browne, Robyn Nevin, Shane Jacobson, Rhonda Burchmore, Grant Piro and Rohan Browne. He toured Korea and New Zealand as Brad Majors in The Rocky Horror Show, with Lucy Maunder as Janet, Kristian Lavercombe as Riff Raff and the original writer of the show, Richard O'Brien, as the narrator.

In 2011 Rathgeber performed in three productions for Melbourne's The Production Company. First, Australian stage legend Nancye Hayes and musical director John Foreman cast Rathgeber in the part of Greg Connell in The Boy from Oz, in which he sang the classic "I Honestly Love You" to Todd McKenney's Peter Allen. This production also featured Fem Belling as Liza Minnelli and Robyn Arthur as Marion Woolnough. During the Melbourne summer season of The Boy From Oz, artistic director Ken Mackenzie-Forbes invited Rathgeber to appear in the role of Billy Crocker in Anything Goes, teaming him up with Amanda Harrison as Reno, Wayne Scott Kermond as Moonface and Todd McKenney as Evelyn. Following on, Rathgeber was cast by Roger Hodgman and Kellie Dickerson in the dual roles of Joseph P. Kennedy Jr. and Jerry in Grey Gardens, starring Pamela Rabe as Little Edie (Edith Bouvier Beale) and Nancye Hayes as Edith Ewing Bouvier Beale.

In 2012, after creating the role of Sid Worley in various workshops of An Officer and a Gentleman, Simon Philips cast Rathgeber in this tortured soul role for its world premiere production, which opened at the Sydney Lyric in May that year. Rathgeber played alongside Ben Mingay as Zack Mayo, the part made famous by Richard Gere. The stage adaptation of the film was co-penned by producer Sharleen Cooper Cohen and original screenplay writer Douglas Day Stuart, with music by Ken Hirsch, it also starred Bert La Bonté, Kate Kendall, Amanda Harrison and Zahra Newman.

For the Midsumma Festival of 2013, Dean Bryant created the verbatim play Gaybies, casting Rathgeber in a lineup including Magda Szubanski, Virginia Gay, Brent Hill and Trevor Ashley among others. In 2015 Rathgeber joined the cast of Next to Normal at Sydney's Hayes Theatre, playing the two doctor roles to Natalie O'Donnell's portrayal of mentally-ill Diana.

In 2015, Rathgeber returned to the role of Billy Crocker for the national tour of Anything Goes, produced by Opera Australia and GFO. The Australian tour of Anything Goes opened at the Sydney Opera House in September 2015 then travelled to the Princess Theatre Melbourne and Queensland Performing Arts Centre, Brisbane. The production was directed by Dean Bryant and choreographed by Andrew Hallsworth, this time with Caroline O'Connor as Reno, Claire Lyon as Hope and Carmen Duncan as Mrs. Harcourt. For his role as Billy, Rathgeber won the 2015 Helpmann Award for Best Male Actor in a Supporting Role in a Musical.

Stepping straight off the Sydney Opera House stage, Rathgeber played the villain Carl in the Australian tour of Ghost the Musical opposite Wicked stars Rob Mills and Jemma Rix as Sam and Molly. This production was the touring version of Matthew Warchus's UK production, which was choreographed by Ashley Wallen. Rathgeber next returned to Melbourne to play the role of Aaron Fox in Curtains the Musical, alongside Simon Gleeson, Lucy Maunder and Alinta Chidzey for Melbourne's The Production Company.

In 2017 Rathgeber was cast in the Australian national tour of The Wizard of Oz as Hickory and Tin Man. He toured Australia alongside Anthony Warlow in the title role of the Wizard, Jemma Rix as the Wicked Witch, Lucy Durack as Glinda the Good Witch and Samantha Dodemaide as Dorothy. This revival of The Wizard of Oz featured new music by Andrew Lloyd Webber and was directed by the UK's Jeremy Sams and played at the Queensland Performing Arts Centre, Brisbane, the Capitol Theatre, Sydney, The Adelaide Festival Centre and The Regent Theatre, Melbourne throughout 2017 and 2018.

In October/November 2019, Rathgeber was cast as Simon Stride in the first Australian professional production of Jekyll & Hyde. It was staged to critical acclaim, with performances sold out with full standing ovations. The production marked the 25th Anniversary of Anthony Warlow's iconic 'Complete Works' recording. It starred Anthony Warlow performing Jekyll & Hyde on stage for the first time and leading Australian music theatre star Jemma Rix as Lucy. The cast included a host of leading Australian music theatre and opera stars.

== Television ==
Rathgeber has played the roles of Jim Hallett-Jones in the 2008 TV series Rush for Network Ten, Gwilym Evans in Miss Fisher's Murder Mysteries for ABC, and Marcus Hallam in Winners & Losers for the Seven Network.

== Concerts and live performances ==
Rathgeber has been a guest artist at fundraising events including Hats Off! Melbourne, and Hats Off! Sydney, Light The Night, The Brian Stacey Night, the Save La Mama Theatre (Melbourne) concert, TheatreAid Flood Relief, Black Saturday bushfires appeals, and a regular guest singer for Very Special Kids' annual Memorial Day ceremonies commemorating the lives of children who've lost their battle with terminal illnesses.

In 2012, Rathgeber performed the Australian national anthem for Sydney's Golden Slipper Stakes horse racing event. He also sang the anthem for the launch of the 2013 Australian of the Year Awards, with former prime minister of Australia Julia Gillard in attendance.

Rathgeber has headlined numerous concerts alongside the likes of Rhonda Burchmore, Matt Hetherington, Rob Mills, Lucy Durack, Tim Draxl, Chelsea Plumley, Marina Prior, James Millar, Elise McCann, Anna O'Byrne, Amy Lehpamer, Judi Connelli, Trevor Ashley, Gorgi Coghlan, Wendy Stapleton, Suzanne Johnston, Mathew Frank, Simon Burke and many more.

== Cabaret ==
In 2004, Rathgeber made his solo cabaret debut with A Momentary Act at The Butterfly Club in Melbourne, directed by Martin Croft and featuring original music and accompaniment by composer-lyricist Matthew Lee Robinson. In 2010 Rathgeber featured in the cabaret Seriously Something with Matthew Lee Robinson, Chris Parker and Josh Piterman at Melbourne's Chapel Off Chapel. Rathgeber was invited by the 2010 Adelaide Cabaret Festival artistic director David Campbell to perform a new solo show in the festival, for which he co-created the Cole Porter-themed experiment with writer-director Dean Bryant and musical director James Simpson. In 2015 Rathgeber joined forces with Silvie Paladino to present Unforgettable.

== Nominations and awards ==
In 2015, Rathgeber was awarded a Helpmann Award for his performance as Billy Crocker in Anything Goes for Opera Australia and John Frost. He had previously been nominated in the Sydney Theatre Awards for his performance as Sid Worley in An Officer and a Gentleman, and in the Green Room Awards for his performance as Older Patrick in Mame.

After his success in London in 2007, Rathgeber was awarded a civic reception from the City of Horsham by the mayor, Councillor Gary Bird.

== Recordings ==
- Sideshow Alley the Musical, Australian Cast Recording (2007); world premiere cast recording.
- Georgy Girl the Musical, Australian Cast Recording (2015); world premiere cast recording.
- Easy to Love (2015); solo album by Alex Rathgeber featuring Caroline O'Connor, Lucy Maunder and Claire Lyon. Musical director Stephen Amos. Produced by James Kempster at Rockcandy Productions.

== Workshops and developmental works ==
Rathgeber has taken part in the development of various new musicals including Georgy Girl, Dream Lover: The Bobby Darin Musical, Melba, An Officer and a Gentleman, Happy People, Atlantis, Muriel's Wedding the Musical, The Silver Donkey, King Kong and others.

== Voluntary work ==
Rathgeber has been an ambassador for Entertainment Assist since 2017, advocating for increased mental health awareness and support for Australian entertainment industry workers. As a strong supporter of his hometown Horsham, Victoria, he is an ambassador for the Horsham Town Hall Performing Arts Centre.
