= Mann-o-Mann =

- Genre: Game show
- Presented by: Peer Augustinski
- Country of origin: Germany
- Original language: German

Production
- Running time: 180 minutes approx including commercials
- Production company: Reg Grundy Productions

Original release
- Network: Sat. 1
- Release: 11 January 1992 – 8 July 1995

Mann-o-Mann was a German game show, which was aired on Sat.1 from 1992 until 1995. It was produced by Reg Grundy and hosted by Peer Augustinski. The show was loosely in the format of a beauty pageant, but with male contestants. An all-female audience voted for the winner via a series of elimination rounds, in which losing contestants would be pushed into a swimming pool.

== Format ==
The male contestants would compete in a number of rounds where characteristics a woman may seek in a romantic partner - such as general knowledge, romantic aptitude, conversation skills and sense of humour - would be tested.

At the end of each round, members of the entirely female audience each voted for their favourite man using a remote control device and the least popular male would be eliminated from the competition by being pushed into the swimming pool that formed part of the show's set by one of the show's hostesses.

At the beginning of each episode, the ten male contestants would come out on the stage and introduce themselves to the audience, and from these first impressions the audience would eliminate the 3 least popular guys.

The 7 that were left then progressed to the next round, which is a true or false game and saw the guys to see how much they know about women.

The next 2 rounds would have the final 5 doing a fairground hammer bell and then performing various songs for karaoke.

The final 3 surviving guys go through to the final 2 round, which were to answer the girls questions and how much can they cope under pressure.

After this, the audience voted for the winner, with the two runner-up contestants being pushed into the pool simultaneously.

== Merchandise ==
A board game based on the show was released by Schmidt Spiele in 1994.

== International versions ==
Country	Title	Broadcaster	Presenter(s)	Premiere	Finale
Argentina	Man O Man	Canal 13	Horacio Cabak	1997	
Australia	Man O Man	Seven Network	Rob Guest	5 February 1994	25 November 1994
Denmark	Mand O Mand	TV3	Michael Carøe	1994	
France	Le Chéri de ces dames (1995); Chéri Chéries (1998-1999)	TF1	Jean Philippe Lustyk; Pascal Brunner	25 August 1995	15 January 1999
Greece	Άνδρες έтoіμoі γіα όλα Andres etoimoi gia ola	ANT1	Andreas Mikroutsikos	1998	2000
Indonesia	Sang Lelaki	Indosiar	?	2004	
Italy	Beato tra le donne	Rai 1 (1994-1995; 2003); Canale 5 (1996-2000)	Paolo Bonolis (1994-1997); Enrico Papi (1999); Natalia Estrada (2000); Massimo Giletti (2003)	7 July 1994	29 August 2003
Netherlands	Man O Man	Veronica	Hans Kraay Jr.	1995	
Norway	Mann Oh! mann	TV3	Ragnar Otnes; Lars Eikanger	29 March 1994	24 March 1996
Poland	Trafiony, Zatopiony	TVN	Andrzej Supron	28 August 2000	25 December 2000
Portugal	Ai os Homens	SIC	José Figueiras	1996	1998
Spain	Elles i Ells	Canal Nou	Paco Sanchis; Juanjo Prats	19 July 1993	9 January 1995
Spain	Uno para todas	Telecinco	Goyo González	19 April 1995	12 September 1996
Sweden	Man O Man	TV3	Peter Ahlm	1996	
United Kingdom	Man O Man	ITV	Chris Tarrant	4 May 1996	7 August 1999
United States	Man O Man	UPN	Michael Burger	12 August 1995	
Turkey	Ah Kızlar Vah Erkekler (1995-1996); Erkek Dediğin (1997)	Kanal D	Özlem Savaş (1995-1996); Halit Ergenç (1997)	1995	1997
Vietnam	Quý Ông Đại Chiến	VTV3	Lại Văn Sâm (2018); Thành Trung (2019-2020)	5 May 2018	25 July 2020
