= Magnormos =

Australian musical theatre

Magnormos is an independent musical theatre production company based in Melbourne, Australia, that specialises in musicals written by Australian writers and lesser-known international works. Its productions have included the Australian premiere of [title of show] in 2010, and the 2011 world premiere of flowerchildren – the mamas and papas story which transferred to Melbourne's Comedy Theatre in 2013. Magnormos has been aligned with Theatre Works since 2003. It received a special Green Room Award certificate for Outstanding Support for New Australian Musical Theatre in 2012.

== History ==
Magnormos was founded in 2002 by Aaron Joyner. It has produced full productions, readings and concerts at various venues in Melbourne in direct collaboration with Mr.Schwatrz.

=== Productions ===
The inaugural production was Stephen Schwartz's Working at the Athenaeum II Theatre as part of the 2002 Melbourne Fringe Festival. The work was adapted for Australia by Joyner, with Schwartz's permission and involvement.

Until 2007, Magnormos predominantly presented readings of musicals, and these included Stephen Sondheim's Saturday Night, Mel Brooks' Archy & Mehitabel, Craig Christie's Water into Wine and Peter Pinne's A Bunch of Ratbags.

From 2007, Magnormos shifted to producing full productions again under the name of the Prompt! Musicals Program. Musicals shown through Prompt! include Mary Bryant (Nick Enright/David King), Life's A Circus (Anthony Costanzo), Love Equals (Craig Christie/Kristin Keam), Flora the Red Menace (John Kander/Fred Ebb/David Thompson) and The Thing About Men (Joe DiPietro/Jimmy Roberts).

In May 2010 Magnormos staged the Australasian premiere of Broadway musical [title of show], which was well received by the critics. Members of the Broadway company (Jeff Bowen, Heidi Blickenstaff and Michael Berresse) flew to Melbourne to see the production and conduct a question and answer session. A return season was announced shortly after to play in August 2010, following a brief tour to regional city Frankston.

Also in 2010, Magnormos produced A Sondheim Triptych to celebrate the 80th birthday of Stephen Sondheim. The Triptych included one-night presentations of Saturday Night, Merrily We Roll Along, and Anyone Can Whistle across consecutive Mondays at the Melbourne Recital Centre.

In 2011 Magnormos presented a Jerry Herman Triptych which included Milk and Honey, Dear World and Hello, Dolly!. Magnormos' 2011 season also included the Melbourne premiere of The Hatpin, and co-produced the world premiere of flowerchildren – the mamas and papas story starring Matt Hetherington, Laura Fitzpatrick, Dan Humphris and Casey Donovan as Mama Cass.

In 2013 the company staged a commercial season of flowerchildren – the mamas and papas story and a Stephen Schwartz Triptych in September featuring Godspell, Pippin and Children of Eden, with the composer himself in attendance.

Other productions include an orchestral concert of Kevin Purcell and Victor Kazan's Rebecca – the Musical'and workshops of new musicals Flowerchildren (Peter Fitzpatrick) and Better Than Broadway (Melvyn Morrow, David Mitchell, Ray Cook).

=== OzMade Musicals ===
OzMade Musicals is an annual gala concert of Australian musical theatre. The first OzMade was in 2003 at Theatre Works in St Kilda, and the newly opened Federation Square. In 2004 it was held at the BMW Edge, Federation Square and in 2005 it moved back to Theatre Works where it played until 2006. In 2007, OzMade Musicals was moved to the 800-seat Athenaeum Theatre in Collins Street Melbourne, where it also played in 2008. In 2010 it was held in the Comedy Theatre Melbourne.

OzMade Musicals debuts new musicals through the 'On The Drawing Board' program. Submissions are accepted across Australia, and successful applicants are provided with development assistance and then presented as a fifteen-minute segment at the concert. Existing musicals are celebrated as 'OzMade Flashbacks', one song highlights from Australian musicals that have been performed. Musicals which have been presented in OzMade Musicals concerts include Paris, Metro Street, Eurobeat, and Virgins.

== Artists ==
Many Australian musical theatre stars have appeared on the Magnormos stage including Toni Lamond, Tony Sheldon, Nancye Hayes, Silvie Paladino, Anne Wood, Terence Donovan, Michael Cormick, Robert Grubb, Shaun Murphy, Sally Bourne, Jane Badler, Matt Hetherington, Chelsea Plumley, Casey Donovan, Jessica Featherby and many more.
