= Helpmann Award for Best Male Actor in a Supporting Role in a Musical =

Annual Australian musical theatre award

- Awarded for: Best Male Actor in a Supporting Role in a Musical
- Location: Australia
- Presented by: Live Performance Australia
- Currently held by: Matt Verevis for Beautiful (2018)
- Website: HelpmannAwards.com.au

The Helpmann Award for Best Male Actor in a Supporting Role in a Musical is a musical award, presented by Live Performance Australia (LPA) at the annual Helpmann Awards since 2003. This is a list of winners and nominations for the Helpmann Award for Best Male Actor in a Supporting Role in a Musical.

== Winners and nominees ==
Winners are listed first and marked in a separate colour.

=== 2000s ===
Year	Actor	Production	Character(s)
2003 (3rd)
2003 (3rd)	Henri Szeps	Cabaret	Herr Schultz
2003 (3rd)	Philip Dodd	Oliver!	Mr Sowerberry and Dr Grimwig
2003 (3rd)	Simon Gleeson	Mamma Mia!	Sky
2003 (3rd)	Tony Sheldon	The Witches of Eastwick	Clyde
2004 (4th)
2004 (4th)	Robert Grubb	We Will Rock You	Pop
2004 (4th)	Terry Bader	The Lion King	Zazu
2004 (4th)	Mitchell Butel	The Republic of Myopia	Oswald
2004 (4th)	Rodney Dobson	The Full Monty	Dave
2005 (5th)
2005 (5th)	Tony Sheldon	The Producers	Roger De Bris
2005 (5th)	Sandro Colarelli	The Venetian Twins	Pancrazio
2005 (5th)	Gerry Connolly	Urinetown	Caldwell B. Cladwell
2005 (5th)	Matt McGrath	The Black Rider	Wilhelm
2006 (6th)
2006 (6th)	Tyler Coppin	The 25th Annual Putnam County Spelling Bee	Vice Principal Douglas Panch
2006 (6th)	Mitchell Butel	Summer Rain	Clarrie Mitchell
2006 (6th)	Barry Crocker	Fiddler on the Roof	Lazar Wolfe
2006 (6th)	Bert Labonte	The 25th Annual Putnam County Spelling Bee	Mitch Mahoney
2007 (7th)
2007 (7th)	Terry Serio	Keating!	Bob Hawke
2007 (7th)	Michael Caton	Priscilla, Queen of the Desert	Bob
2007 (7th)	Juan Jackson	Miss Saigon	John Thomas
2007 (7th)	RJ Rosales	Miss Saigon	Thuy
2008 (8th)
2008 (8th)	Shane Jacobson	Guys and Dolls	Nicely-Nicely Johnson
2008 (8th)	Linal Haft	Billy Elliot the Musical	George
2008 (8th)	Bill Hunter	Priscilla, Queen of the Desert	Bob
2008 (8th)	John Paul Young	Shout! The Legend Of The Wild One	Guest roles^{[A]}
2009 (9th)
2009 (9th)	Rob Guest	Wicked	The Wizard
2009 (9th)	Damien Bermingham	Chicago	Amos Hart
2009 (9th)	Robert Grubb	My Fair Lady	Alfred P Doolittle
2009 (9th)	Derek Metzger	Monty Python's Spamalot	Patsy

=== 2010s ===
Year	Actor	Production	Character(s)
2010 (10th)
2010 (10th)	Luke Joslin	Avenue Q	Nikki and Trekkie Monster
2010 (10th)	Scott Johnson	Jersey Boys	Tommy DeVito
2010 (10th)	Adam Murphy	The Drowsy Chaperone	Aldolpho
2010 (10th)	Geoff Revell	The Wizard of Oz	Wicked Witch of the West
2011 (11th)
2011 (11th)	Philip Quast	Mary Poppins	Mr George Banks
2011 (11th)	Martin Crewes	Doctor Zhivago	Pasha
2011 (11th)	Simon Gleeson	Love Never Dies	Viscount Raoul de Chagny
2011 (11th)	Scott Irwin	Hairspray	Corny Collins
2012 (12th)
2012 (12th)	Bert LaBonte	An Officer and a Gentleman	Sgt. Emil Foley
2012 (12th)	Euan Doidge	A Chorus Line	Paul
2012 (12th)	Brent Hill	Rock of Ages	Lonny
2012 (12th)	Todd McKenney	Annie	Rooster
2013 (13th)
2013 (13th)	Russell Dykstra	The Addams Family	Uncle Fester
2013 (13th)	Chris Ryan	King Kong	Jack Driscoll
2013 (13th)	Hugh Sheridan	A Funny Thing Happened on the Way to the Forum	Hero
2013 (13th)	Mike Snell	Legally Blonde	Chad/Dewey/Kyle
2014 (14th)
2014 (14th)	Reg Livermore	Wicked	The Wizard
2014 (14th)	Drew Forsythe	Strictly Ballroom The Musical	Doug Hastings
2014 (14th)	Russell Dykstra	The Lion King	Pumbaa
2014 (14th)	Marty Rhone	The King and I	The Kralahome
2015 (15th)
2015 (15th)	Alex Rathgeber	Anything Goes	Billy Crocker
2015 (15th)	Eddie Muliaumaseali'i	Show Boat	Joe
2015 (15th)	Trevor Ashley	Les Misérables	Thénardier
2015 (15th)	Chris Durling	Les Misérables	Enjolras
2015 (15th)	Brent Hill	Once	Svec
2015 (15th)	Colin Dean	Once	Billy
2016 (16th)
2016 (16th)	Daniel Frederiksen	Matilda the Musical	Mr Wormwood
2016 (16th)	Jack Chambers	Singin' in the Rain	Cosmo Brown
2016 (16th)	Tyler Coppin	Little Shop of Horrors	Mr Mushnik
2016 (16th)	Simon Gallaher	Wicked	The Wizard
2017 (17th)
2017 (17th)	Michael James Scott	Aladdin	Genie
2017 (17th)	Reg Livermore	My Fair Lady	Alfred P. Doolittle
2017 (17th)	Bert LaBonte	The Book of Mormon	Mafala Hatimbi
2017 (17th)	Rowan Witt	The Book of Mormon	Elder McKinley
2018 (18th)
2018 (18th)	Mat Verevis	Beautiful: The Carole King Musical	Barry Mann
2018 (18th)	Bobby Fox	Assassins	Charles J. Guiteau
2018 (18th)	Martin Crewes	Dream Lover: The Bobby Darin Musical	Stephen Blauner
2018 (18th)	Robert Grubb	Priscilla, Queen of the Desert	Bob
2019 (19th)
2019 (19th)	Tony Sheldon	Roald Dahl's Charlie and the Chocolate Factory	Grandpa Joe
2019 (19th)	Marty Alix	In the Heights	Sonny de la Vega
2019 (19th)	Mark Hill	Handa Opera on Sydney Harbour: West Side Story	Riff
2019 (19th)	Joel Granger	The Book of Mormon	Elder McKinley

== See also ==
- Helpmann Awards

== Notes ==
A : In Shout! The Legend Of The Wild One, John Paul Young featured in guest cameos, playing parts such as the security guard and "tartan-trousered sideshow barker".
