= Metro Street =

- Music: Matthew Lee Robinson
- Lyrics: Matthew Lee Robinson
- Book: Matthew Lee Robinson
- Productions: 2009 Adelaide; 2009 Daegu
- Awards: 2004 Pratt Prize for Musical Theatre

Metro Street is an original Australian musical with book, music and lyrics by Matthew Lee Robinson. It was awarded the Pratt Prize for Music Theatre in 2004, and went through many workshops and readings, including at the Adelaide Cabaret Festival in 2006, before its world premiere season with the State Theatre Company of South Australia in April 2009.

== Development ==
Robinson conceived the title song to Metro Street while catching a tram in Melbourne in 2002. In 2004 Robinson wrote a first draft script for submission to the New York Musical Theatre Festival, and fleshed out this draft to enter for the Pratt Prize. The first two workshops for the piece occurred in August 2004. This first draft which won he Pratt Prize had a mother, her son, his girlfriend, a country girl and a street-side busker; the busker was cut in draft two, and replaced with the grandma character.

In 2005 Metro Street received its Pratt Prize workshop and showcase production at Chapel Off Chapel in Melbourne, with a cast of Carrie Barr, Lucy Durack, Verity Hunt-Ballard, Benjamin Lewis and Sally-Anne Upton, directed by Tom Healey and music directed by Michael Tyack.

A concert version of Metro Street was presented for one performance at the 2006 Adelaide Cabaret Festival with an Adelaide-based cast of Nicholas Cannon, Melissa McCaig, Jacqy Phillips, Sky Ingram and Libby O'Donovan, directed by Terence O'Connell, with Matthew Lee Robinson as the music director.

Metro Street was also presented as part of the Magnormos OzMade Musicals in 2004 and 2005, and many readings and workshops through 2007 and 2008 in Melbourne, Sydney and Perth.

== Productions ==
The world premiere season of Metro Street was presented by the State Theatre Company of South Australia (STCSA) with Arts Asia Pacific and Power Arts in April 2009. Previews began 3 April, opening night was 7 April, and it ran to 25 April. The cast was Debra Byrne, Cameron Goodall, Nancye Hayes, Jude Henshall and Verity Hunt-Ballard. Sets by Victoria Lamb, lighting by Geoff Cobham, directed by Geordie Brookman, with Matthew Carey as the musical director.

In June 2009, the STCSA production of Metro Street was the opening show at the Daegu International Musical Festival in South Korea, where it was named in the top 10 musicals playing in the country.

At the 2009 Helpmann Awards on 5 August, for which the STCSA production was nominated for five awards, Nancye Hayes, Debra Byrne, Cameron Goodall, Jude Henshall and Verity Hunt-Ballard performed the closing song, "My Hands" (referred to as "Invitation" in STCSA material).

== Synopsis ==
Sue is dealing with a marriage that has broken down and a recent diagnosis of breast cancer that she doesn't know how to communicate to her son, Chris. Chris and his girlfriend Amy are having troubles of their own nearing the end of their University courses and unsure where life is leading. Chris and Amy's neighbour, Kerry, has come to the city to escape her small country town, meanwhile Jo, Sue's Mum, is trying to hold things together for her daughter and grandson.

== Plot ==
Setting: Melbourne, Australia

=== Act one ===
Amy and Chris who are both studying at university and have recently moved in together. ("Love Is") A new girl moves in next door, Kerry, who is loud, friendly and sensual, everything that Amy isn't. ("The Girl Next Door") Amy is studying feminism and is a bit of a prude, but she befriends Kerry and takes her out shopping, along with Chris's grandmother, Jo. Jo and Kerry have very similar taste in clothing and in the beauty of being female. ("Yes I Know") Amy is against the flaunting of women's sexuality in advertising.

Chris's mum, Sue is recently separated from her husband and is trying to cope with being alone. ("Never Going To End") Her ex is demanding a divorce hearing so that they can split up their assets. What she doesn't know is that he has already moved on with someone else. Chris doesn't want to tell his mother, as he knows she won't cope with this.

Chris and Amy talk about what's going on in their life. ("How’s Life") Chris tells Amy that he's been accepted to study in London, which is a huge opportunity for him, but Amy doesn't want to go and doesn't believe that Chris wants her there anyway.

A few weeks later they go out for a second anniversary dinner but Chris is running late. ("Mobile Phone Quartet") This forces Amy to see that they are on two different paths and that he doesn't seem to want her in his life. They break up. ("Never Going To End") Sue discovers that she has breast cancer and doesn't want to tell her son, even though Jo is telling her that she needs his support. Kerry is now working in a call centre and seeing someone new. The Act finishes with the company singing. ("Overcome")

=== Act two ===
The act opens with, ("Got to Get to"). Six months have passed and Chris has stayed in Australia and moved back in with his mum to help her out. Jo is looking after her daughter and gets frustrated when Chris doesn't pull his weight. Chris has finished university, but is working in a café. This has made him angry, frustrated and selfish telling everyone that he put his life on hold for this.

Amy and Kerry have become good friends and spend many nights together drinking and going out on the town. ("A Girl Like Me") Amy is working in an office and has a brief relationship with the photocopy boy. She starts to do things because she wants to, not because her parents like it, such as joining the young labour party. Kerry is still her outgoing self and is a good influence on Amy.

After a big night on the town we see Kerry at a café that Chris works at. He asks about Amy and she tells him that she always liked him. Amy turns up and she talks to Chris about how he's behaving. She's worried about him, but he is too angry to care. ("As Night Descends")

Sue is going through chemotherapy and is not strong enough to go to Chris's graduation, so Jo goes in her place. The first signs that Sue isn't coping with her illness start to come through. ("Dignity")

After another bust up with his grandmother he goes to Amy's apartment and tells her that he misses her. ("The Best Thing")

Kerry asks Jo how Sue is doing and what it's like to be a mother. ("Love Is") This is when we find out that Kerry has had an abortion, which is why she left home and why she thinks her family don't love her anymore. Kerry gets an amazing job as a personal assistant to a music company head, but is reluctant to take it. With a little convincing from Jo and Amy she jumps at the opportunity, even though it means going to Spain. She takes a leap of faith and organises to spend a week home with her family, who are excited to see her. Meanwhile, Sue's cancer has spread.

The story ends with Chris, Jo and Sue having a picnic together. Chris is finally getting back on track, but Sue is very ill. When Jo leaves to pack up the car Sue and Chris get some alone time and they talk about how scared they are and she talks about how she would like to be remembered. ("Invitation")

== Musical numbers ==
Act I

- "Metro Street" – Chris and Cast
- "The Girl Next Door" – Kerry
- "Love Is" – Amy and Chris
- "Never Going To End" – Sue and Chris
- "Yes, I Know" – Amy
- "How's Life" – Chris and Amy
- "Taxi to the City" – Sue
- "Mobile Phone Quintet" – Company
- "Never Going To End (Reprise)" – Amy and Chris
- "Overcome" – Company

Act II

- "Got To Get To" – Amy, Kerry and Chris
- "A Girl Like Me" – Amy and Kerry
- "Dignity" – Sue
- "Love Is (Reprise)" – Jo
- "As Night Descends" – Chris
- "The Best Thing" – Amy and Chris
- "My Hands" (AKA "Invitation") – Company

=== Notes ===
In earlier versions of the show, "Yes, I Know" was written for the characters of Amy, Jo and Kerry to sing together but by the time the show premiered in Adelaide in 2009, it was a solo performance by Amy only. The reprise of "Never Going to End" takes the place of another song, "Say the Word" – a much angrier break-up song. "Love Is", "How's Life", "The Best Thing" and a song titled "Someone Else" first appeared as part of the show for the October 2007 reading. Early versions of "The Best Thing" refer back to the song "Say the Word". Those references are now gone. "Someone Else" was eventually replaced by "As Night Descends" – a song for Chris in a similar vein and written during development of the STCSA season. Finally, the order of some of the songs in the second act was changed in preparation for the World Premiere Season in Adelaide – reflected in the list above.

Three other songs composed for earlier versions of Metro Street – "Kerry's Land", "Just Say" and "Late Again" – will be part of Robinson's upcoming song cycle, Sing on Through Tomorrow.

== Casts ==
Casts of productions of Metro Street
Productions	Sue Barnes	Chris Barnes	Jo McAuley	Amy Francis	Kerry Malone
2005 Pratt Prize Workshop	Carrie Barker	Benjamin Lewis	Sally-Anne Upton	Lucy Durack	Verity Hunt-Ballard
2006 Adelaide Cabaret Festival	Melissa McCraig	Nicolas Cannon	Jacqy Phillips	Sky Ingram	Libby O'Donovan
February 2007 Reading	Genevieve Lemon	Benjamin Lewis	Nancye Hayes	Lucy Durack	Amelia Cormack
October 2007 Reading	Robyn Arthur	Graham Foote	Nancye Hayes	Lucy Durack	Verity Hunt-Ballard
2009 State Theatre Company	Debra Byrne	Cameron Goodall	Nancye Hayes	Jude Henshall	Verity Hunt-Ballard
2009 DIMF	Debra Byrne	Matthew Lee Robinson	Nancye Hayes	Esther Hannaford	Hollie Andrew

=== Notes ===
In a recent presentation of Matthew Lee Robinson's music at Chapel Off Chapel in Melbourne, which featured a selection of songs from Robinson's career, a number of Metro Street songs were performed: the title track by Robinson, "The Girl Next Door" by Verity Hunt-Ballard, "As Night Descends" by Robinson, "A Girl Like Me" by Ballard and Rosemarie Harris, "Dignity" by Robyn Arthur and "My Hands" by Robinson, Ballard, Harris and Arthur.

== Awards and nominations ==
- 2004 Pratt Prize for Musical Theatre – Matthew Lee Robinson (winner)
- 2009 Daugu Musical Awards
  - Best Musical (nominated)
  - Best Female Actor in a Leading Role – Debra Byrne (winner)
  - Best Male Actor in a Leading Role – Matthew Lee Robinson (nominated)
  - Best Female Actor in a Supporting Role – Nancye Hayes (nominated)
- 2009 Helpmann Awards
  - Best New Australian Work – Matthew Lee Robinson (nominated)
  - Best Lighting Design – Geoff Cobham (nominated)
  - Best Music Direction – Matthew Carey (nominated)
  - Best Choreography in a Musical – Jo Stone (nominated)
  - Best Direction of a Musical – Geordie Brookman (nominated)
- 2009 Adelaide Theatre Guide "Curtain Call" Awards
  - Best Show – Musical (Professional) (winner)
  - Best Male Performance (Professional) – Cameron Goodall (nominated)
  - Best Female Performance (Professional) – Debra Byrne (nominated)
  - Best Female Performance (Professional) – Verity Hunt-Ballard (winner)
  - Best Technical (Professional) – Victoria Lamb, set design (nominated)
- 2009 Victorian Premier's Literary Awards
  - Prize for Best Musical Theatre Script (shortlisted)
- 2009 Adelaide Critics Circle Awards
  - Group Award (nominated)
