= Pratt Prize for Music Theatre =

Award for an unperformed Australian musical

The Pratt Prize for Music Theatre was an award for an unperformed Australian musical. It was initiated through the Pratt Foundation in 2001 to stimulate music theatre writers and composers to create work with commercial appeal. The award originally comprised a $50,000 cash prize and a workshop valued at $30,000.

Recipients were:

- 2002: Sideshow Alley by Paul Keelan and Gary Young
- 2004: Metro Street by Matthew Robinson
- 2006: Awarded as commissions to Anthony Crowley and Dean Bryant & Mathew Frank
