= An Officer and a Gentleman (disambiguation) =

An Officer and a Gentleman is a 1982 American film.

An Officer and a Gentleman may also refer to:

- An Officer and a Gentleman (musical), a 2012 stage musical based on the film
- "An Officer and a Gentleman" (The Army Show), a 1998 television episode
- "An Officer and a Gentleman" (Roseanne), a 1990 television episode
- "An Officer and a Gentleman", an episode of Doctor in Charge

== See also ==
- Conduct unbecoming an officer and a gentleman, an offense in the armed forces of some nations
