= Man O Man (Australian game show) =

- Genre: Game show
- Presented by: Rob Guest
- Country of origin: Australia
- Original language: English

Production
- Running time: 42 minutes
- Production company: Reg Grundy Productions

Original release
- Network: Seven Network
- Release: 5 February – 25 November 1994

Related
- Man O Man

Man O Man is an Australian television game show that was broadcast of the Seven Network in 1994.

Hosted by Rob Guest, the program was based on the original German version of the same name.

== Program synopsis ==
=== Format ===
The program was presented loosely in the format of a male beauty pageant. An all-female audience of 125 women sitting at tables used a small computer to vote for their favourite man out of the ten male competitors after they had asked to participate in a series of challenges. Notably, losing contestants would be eliminated by being pushed into a swimming pool by female models who worked on the show.

Guest, who was starring in The Phantom of the Opera in Sydney at the time, had to take one night off from appearing on stage every fortnight to enable him to fly to Melbourne to record two episodes of Man O Man. Although Guest hosted the show, John Deeks was credited with warming up the all-female audience before each show and sustaining the atmosphere throughout any interruptions which occurred during tapings. Deeks described the show as the "most bizarre" television program he had ever worked on.

=== Launch ===
Prior to the first episode, the Seven Network hosted a launch party for journalists which was also attended by cast members of new drama Blue Heelers which was about the debut on the network, and Gary Sweet who was about the star in miniseries The Battlers. While Seven's director of programming Glen Kinging was escorting guests around the studio, he was pushed into the pool fully clothed by colleague, publicist Susan Wood, in a pre-planned stunt.

Seven Network manager Bob Campbell ordered a fig leaf be placed over the penis of a naked male statue, which had been placed on the set, before the first episode aired. Having the swimming pool built into the studio was reported to have cost Seven $200,000.

=== Reception ===
The show achieved considerable ratings success upon its debut, winning its timeslot out of the commercial networks in both Melbourne and Sydney, although the debut of Keeping Up Appearances on ABC TV attracted the same amount of viewers as Man O Man in Melbourne. However, the return of Hey Hey It's Saturday on the Nine Network the following week proved to be strong competition in both cities.

The nature of the program was the subject of much commentary in the media, specifically whether the show was an example of reverse sexism. It prompted a number of letter writers in The Age's "Green Guide" to debate the issue. The audience members during each episode of Man O Man were all female. No male audience members were permitted into the studio during the show's taping. When asked if he thought the show was sexist, Guest stated: "Sexist? Why not? It's about time the Aussie male ego got a bit of a bruising." Seven's Melbourne programming director Ian Duncan disagreed and suggested Man O Man was actually more suitable than many episodes of its ratings rival, Hey Hey It's Saturday.

The series established itself as prime competition for the long-running program Hey Hey It's Saturday. In a 1994 article in TV Week, Rob Guest responded to criticism made by Daryl Somers (host of the rival show), saying, "When you've been doing a show for 23 years and a show that is not expected to do well comes up and knocks you for six, then you're not going to take it very well. So I can understand why Daryl would say things like that".

=== Cancellation ===
The final episode of Man O Man, which aired on 25 November 1994, was a Footballers Challenge special that featured players from Australian rules football, rugby league and soccer. The episode was more risqué than usual, with some footballers performing a striptease for the talent act round.

Despite solid ratings, Seven decided to axe the show at the end of 1994 in favour of concentrating on a new show called Gladiators which they were preparing to debut in 1995.

=== Legacy ===
Despite being on air for only one year, the show continues to be frequently referenced by the Australian media. In its annual April Fool's Day prank, website TV Tonight jokingly reported in 2023 that Man O Man was returning to the Seven Network with Chris Brown, who had recently signed a contract with the network, as host.

Man O Man did return briefly to Seven on 26 January 1997 when the debut 1994 episode was repeated as part of the network's Coca-Cola Interactive Summer Night promotion. However, the show has not been repeated since.

Man O Man was filmed at the Seven's studios located in South Melbourne, where other programs such as Full Frontal and Jimeoin were also filmed.

When HSV-7 moved to Docklands in 2002, the original studio complex in South Melbourne was taken over by production company Global Television (later NEP Australia) who called it Media City Melbourne. Until 2014, Seven remained a 50% shareholder in the studio complex. The original Man O Man pool remains situated underneath the studio floor in Studio A at the NEP complex in Melbourne. The studio has since been utilised as the Dancing with the Stars dance floor. The Man O Man pool was also used by Network 10 soap Neighbours to simulate a plane crashing into the Bass Strait as part of its 2005 storyline where several characters were killed off.

Guest died in 2008. When reporting his death, The Sydney Morning Herald described Man O Man as possibly "the most puerile TV program before Big Brother", despite Guest considering it as fun.

== See also ==
- List of Australian television series
- List of Seven Network programs
