= Sideshow Alley (musical) =

- Original cast recording
- Music: Paul Keelan
- Lyrics: Gary Young
- Book: Gary Young
- Premiere: 3 February 2007: Playhouse, QPAC
- Productions: 2007 Brisbane
- Awards: Helpmann Award for Best Original Score

Sideshow Alley is an Australian musical by Paul Keelan and Gary Young. Set amongst the 'misfits', 'outcasts' and 'curiosities' of a 1950s Outback travelling show, Sideshow Alley tells the story of Rita, an Italian fortune-teller, Billy, a rugged tent boxer, and Alec, a charismatic drifter, intertwined in a love triangle filled with secrets and lies. It concerns themes of unbridled love and the discovery of identity in a world of prejudice.

== Development ==
Young and Keelan's Sideshow Alley received the inaugural Pratt Prize for Music Theatre in 2002. The prize included a workshop production, staged at Melbourne's Chapel Off Chapel in August 2003 directed by Gale Edwards with a cast including Tamsin Carroll, Greg Stone and Robyn Arthur. Melbourne's Playbox Theatre Company announced a full-scale production for its 2004 season but this was later cancelled when Playbox could not secure a co-producer.

== Production history ==
The original Australian production of Sideshow Alley began previews on 20 January 2007 and opened on 3 February 2007 at the Playhouse, Queensland Performing Arts Centre in Brisbane. Produced by McPherson Ink, it was directed by Young with choreography by Andrew Hallsworth. The cast included Christopher Parker (Alec), Alex Rathgeber (Billy), Silvie Paladino (Rita), Robyn Arthur (Bev), Mike Bishop (Tiny), Darren Natale (Lady Chiang), Sally-Anne Upton (Fag Ash Lil), Kellie Rode (Annie), Carrie Barr (Cleo), Anton Berezin (Zeke), Emma Hawkins (Dolly Dot), Paul Ross (Snowy), Bay Abbey (Tiger), Irene Dios (Rosie), Emma Hawkins (Dolly Dot), Glen Hogstrom (Larry/Mikey), Luke Stephens (Tom/Archie), Taneel van Zyl, and Grant Durham.

The musical was to transfer to The Palms at Crown in Melbourne. However, with weak ticket sales the production closed in Brisbane after 47 performances.

In September 2007, Kookaburra Musical Theatre announced a Sydney production as part of its 2008 season. This was also later cancelled.

== Reception ==
Sideshow Alley received mixed to positive reviews. Bryce Hallett in the Sydney Morning Herald said that "Keelan's music is an appealing mix of stirring ballads and duets about the fickleness of love, resilience, fortune and fate" and that the musical "has tremendous promise and in its best moments is spirited and heart-warming". He indicated that "Young's book needs refinement, especially the problematic second act which pushes for tragedy without offering sufficient context or logic to convincingly carry it through." Hallett concluded that "Sideshow Alley may not have broken the drought when it comes to producing home-grown musicals, but at least it puts some life and excitement back in the field".

At the 2007 Helpmann Awards, Sideshow Alley won for Best Original Score (Paul Keelan and Gary Young), and received nominations for Best Female Actor in a Musical (Silvie Paladino) and Best Female Actor in a Supporting Role in a Musical (Robyn Arthur).
