= Sweet Charity =

1966 American musical

- Original Broadway cast recording cover (1966)
- Music: Cy Coleman
- Lyrics: Dorothy Fields
- Book: Neil Simon
- Basis: Nights of Cabiria by Federico Fellini; Ennio Flaiano; Tullio Pinelli; Pier Paolo Pasolini
- Productions: 1966 Broadway; 1967 West End; 1986 Broadway revival 2005 Broadway revival 2006 US tour 2009 West End revival
- Awards: 1986 Tony Award for Best Revival

Sweet Charity is a musical with music by Cy Coleman, lyrics by Dorothy Fields, and book by Neil Simon, based on the screenplay for the 1957 Italian film Nights of Cabiria. It was directed and choreographed for Broadway by Bob Fosse starring his wife and muse Gwen Verdon as a dancer-for-hire at a Times Square dance hall, alongside John McMartin.

The musical premiered on Broadway in 1966, where it was nominated for nine Tony Awards, winning the Tony Award for Best Choreography. The production also ran in the West End and has run several revivals and international productions. It was adapted for the screen in 1969, directed and choreographed by Fosse in his feature-film directorial debut. Shirley MacLaine starred as the title character, and McMartin reprised his Broadway role as Oscar Lindquist.

== Plot ==
=== Act I ===
The young woman Charity Hope Valentine is a taxi dancer at a dance hall called the Fandango Ballroom in New York City. With a shoulder bag and a heart tattooed on her left shoulder, Charity meets her boyfriend Charlie in Central Park. While Charlie silently preens himself, Charity speaks the pick-up lines she imagines him saying, and tells him how handsome he is ("You Should See Yourself"). Charlie then steals her handbag and pushes her into the lake (usually the orchestra pit) before running off. Passers-by discuss the apparent drowning but do nothing, until a young Spaniard finally rescues her. In the Hostess Room of the Fandango Ballroom, Charity tries to convince both herself and the other skeptical taxi dancers that Charlie tried to save her. Nickie, a fellow dancer, tells Charity that “your big problem is you run your heart like a hotel – you got guys checkin’ in and out all the time”. The manager, Herman, arrives to tell them it is time for work. The hostess dancers proposition the audience in the front room of the Fandango Ballroom ("Big Spender"). Helene and Nickie try to comfort Charity about Charlie's absence ("Charity's Soliloquy").

On the street, after work, Charity gives to every beggar who approaches her until she realizes she has no money. Just then, film star Vittorio Vidal rushes out of the smart Pompeii Club, in pursuit of his beautiful mistress, Ursula. Ursula refuses to go back inside with Vittorio, who promptly takes the only-too-willing Charity instead. Inside the Pompeii Club, the dancers are dancing the latest craze, The Rich Man's Frug. To everyone's astonishment, the famous Vittorio is accompanied by the unknown Charity. She tries to steer him away from the subject of Ursula. Finally, he wants to dance. Not having eaten since breakfast, Charity faints. There is general agreement amongst the dancers that she needs to be "laid down". Vittorio asks "where?", and Charity recovers enough to prompt Vittorio with "your apartment!".

Lying down on Vittorio's bed, Charity claims she is no longer hungry. She admits she is a dance hall hostess, putting it down to "the fickle finger of fate" (a favorite expression of hers). Vittorio is struck by her humor and honesty. Starstruck, Charity asks for a signed photograph to prove to the girls she was really in his apartment. While Vittorio fetches props from his old movies for further evidence, Charity remarks on her good fortune ("If My Friends Could See Me Now"). Ursula arrives to apologize for her jealousy; Charity is swiftly bundled into a closet before Vittorio opens the door to Ursula. ("Too Many Tomorrows") While Charity watches from the closet, Vittorio and Ursula have sex inside his four-poster bed. The following morning, Charity is escorted from the room by a mortified Vittorio. In the Hostess Room, the girls are disappointed that Charity failed to get more out of Vittorio. Nickie announces she is not going to remain at this job for the rest of her life, prompting the girls to speculate on alternative careers ("There's Gotta Be Something Better Than This"), but Herman brings them back down to earth. Charity decides to seek some cultural enlightenment at the 92nd Street Y, where she gets stuck in a broken elevator with shy tax accountant Oscar Lindquist. While trying to calm him down, Charity learns that he is not married. She declares, "Oh Oscar... You're gonna be all right." After helping Oscar overcome his claustrophobia ("I'm the Bravest Individual"), the pair are plunged into new panic when the lights stop working.

=== Act II ===
After being trapped in a broken elevator, Oscar and Charity are finally rescued when it starts working again. Oscar invites Charity to go to church with him, to which she hesitantly agrees. As they walk under the Manhattan Bridge to the church, the faint cries of the next person to be stuck in the elevator are heard. The Rhythm of Life Church turns out to be a thin veneer on hippie culture ("The Rhythm of Life"). A police raid breaks up the meeting. Traveling home on the subway, Oscar proposes another date and tries to guess Charity's job, deciding that she works in a bank. Charity lies, saying she works for First National City, Williamsburg Branch. As they part, Oscar kisses her hand, and dubs her Sweet Charity ("Sweet Charity").

After two weeks, Oscar and Charity have continued dating, and she still has not confessed what she actually does for a living. At Coney Island Amusement Park they become trapped again when the Parachute Jump ride breaks. This time, Oscar is the calm one while Charity is scared — scared that she is starting to depend on him. Once again, Charity loses her nerve about telling him what her real job is. As the crowd looks on, the couple kisses. On a slow night at the Fandango, Charity loses the opportunity to snare one of the few customers to a new co-worker, Rosie. Disgusted by the whole business, she quits. However, in Times Square, she wonders what the alternative is ("Where Am I Going?"). Sending a telegram to Oscar, she asks to meet him at Barney's Chile Hacienda. She admits that she is a dance hall hostess; he admits he already knows, having followed her one night and watched her dancing. He says he does not care and wants to marry her. Relieved and elated, Charity leaves ("I'm A Brass Band") and packs a suitcase on which is printed 'Almost Married'.

After a farewell party at the Ballroom ("I Love to Cry at Weddings"), Charity and Oscar walk in the park, whereupon Oscar announces that he cannot go through with the wedding, saying he is unable to stop thinking about the "other men". Eventually, believing he’s sparing her an unhappy life with him, he pushes her into the lake and runs off. Emerging from the lake, Charity, speaking directly to the audience, asks "Did you ever have one of those days?". Realizing that unlike Charlie, Oscar has not stolen her bag, she shrugs and reprises her opening dance.

The stage blacks out onto three neon signs, reading "And so she lived … hopefully … ever after".

== Musical numbers ==
Act I

- "Overture"
- "You Should See Yourself" – Charity
- "Big Spender" – Nickie, Helene and Girls
- "Charity's Soliloquy" – Charity
- "Rich Man's Frug" – Ensemble
- "If My Friends Could See Me Now" – Charity
- "Too Many Tomorrows" – Vittorio
- "There's Gotta Be Something Better Than This" – Nickie, Helene and Charity
- "I'm The Bravest Individual" – Charity and Oscar

Act II

- "The Rhythm of Life" – Daddy Brubeck and Ensemble
- "Baby, Dream Your Dream" – Nickie and Helene
- "Sweet Charity" – Oscar
- "Where Am I Going?" – Charity
- "I'm A Brass Band" – Charity and Ensemble
- "I Love To Cry At Weddings" – Herman, Rosie, Nickie, Helene and Ensemble

== Characters ==
- Charity Hope Valentine, the girl who wanted to be loved.
- Oscar Lindquist, a man whom Charity befriends and eventually falls in love with.
- Charlie, Charity's boyfriend in the opening of the show, and the name on her tattoo
- Nickie and Helene, Charity's closest friends who are taxi dancers at the Fandango Ballroom.
- Herman, the authoritarian owner of the Fandango Ballroom; Charity's boss.
- Vittorio Vidal, a famous Italian movie star.
- Ursula March, Vittorio's girlfriend
- Manfred, Vittorio's butler
- Daddy Johann Sebastian Brubeck, the enigmatic leader of the Rhythm of Life Church.
- Carmen, a dancer at the Fandango Ballroom who is friends with Nickie, Helene, and Charity
- Rosie, the new dancer at the Fandango Ballroom.
- Suzanne, Frenchie, Betsy, and Elaine, dancers at the Fandango Ballroom

== Productions ==
=== Original productions ===
After a tryout at the Shubert Theatre in Philadelphia starting Monday, December 6, 1965, it moved to Detroit's Fisher Theatre for a month, and then premiered on Broadway at the Palace Theatre on January 29, 1966, and closed on July 15, 1967, after 608 performances and 10 previews. It was conceived, directed, and choreographed by Bob Fosse, who wrote the original libretto under the pen-name "Bert Lewis", from Robert Louis Fosse. The show starred Gwen Verdon, John McMartin, Helen Gallagher, Thelma Oliver, James Luisi, Arnold Soboloff, Sharon Ritchie, Ruth Buzzi, and Barbara Sharma. Scenic and lighting design were by Robert Randolph and costume design was by Irene Sharaff. The production was nominated for 9 Tony Awards, winning for Fosse's choreography.

The Australian production was produced by J.C. Williamson, starring Nancye Hayes as Charity and Peter Adams as Oscar. The show commenced on 21 January 1967 at Her Majesty's Theatre in Sydney, and subsequently played seasons in Melbourne and Adelaide.

The musical opened in the West End at the Prince of Wales Theatre in October 1967, running for 476 performances. Juliet Prowse starred, and was succeeded by Gretchen Wyler.

=== 1986 Broadway revival ===
A revival opened on Broadway at the Minskoff Theatre on April 27, 1986 and closed on March 15, 1987, running for 369 performances and 15 previews. Again directed and choreographed by Fosse, Debbie Allen starred as Charity with Bebe Neuwirth as Nickie, Allison Williams as Helene and Michael Rupert as Oscar. Fosse's wife Gwen Verdon (the original Charity from 1966), remounted the choreography with Fosse, and taught many of the ensemble numbers to the female chorus. The production won four Tony Awards including the Tony Award for Best Reproduction (Play or Musical). When Allen left the show, Ann Reinking took over as Charity.

=== 1998 benefit concert ===
On June 15, 1998, Broadway Cares/Equity Fights AIDS presented an all-star fully staged one-night-only concert at Avery Fisher Hall in Lincoln Center. It starred Chita Rivera, Bebe Neuwirth, Donna McKechnie, Debbie Allen and, in her last public stage appearance, Gwen Verdon, all in the shared role of Charity.

=== 1998 London revival ===
A West End revival opened on 19 May 1998 and closed on 15 August 1998 at the Victoria Palace Theatre, choreographed by Chet Walker and starring Bonnie Langford.

=== 2005 Broadway revival ===
Christina Applegate starred in another revival of the show, opening on Broadway at the Al Hirschfeld Theatre on May 4, 2005, after a troubled three-city preview tour. The show went into production beginning January 25, 2005, at the Historic Orpheum Theatre in Minneapolis. Audience-attended previews began February 8, with the Opening Night performance held February 17, 2005. The Minneapolis engagement closed on February 20. Applegate broke her foot in Chicago, the second stop on the tour, and was replaced by her understudy, Charlotte d'Amboise. Then, after the final leg of the tour in Boston, the producers announced that the production would not be continuing to Broadway due to lack of interest. However, two days later, the Broadway engagement was on after Applegate convinced the producers to continue. A week into previews, Applegate rejoined the cast, which also included Denis O'Hare as Oscar, Shannon Lewis as Ursula and Ernie Sabella as Herman. The show was nominated for three Tony Awards including Best Revival of a Musical and Best Actress in a Musical for Applegate. Reportedly, pop icon Britney Spears was asked to replace Applegate when her contract expired, but declined the offer. The musical ended its Broadway run on December 31, 2005, after 279 performances.

A national tour of the 2005 Broadway revival began in September 2006 and ended in August 2007. It starred Molly Ringwald and later Paige Davis as Charity.

=== 2009 London revival ===
A revival of the show opened for a limited engagement at London's Menier Chocolate Factory on 21 November 2009 and closed on 7 March 2010. It starred Tamzin Outhwaite as Charity. Outhwaite reprised the title role in the West End transfer of the successful Chocolate Factory production of the show. Playing at the Theatre Royal, Haymarket the show opened officially on 4 May 2010 after previews began on 23 April. This was the first major production to have the same actor (Mark Umbers) play all three of Charity's love interests: Charlie, Vittorio, and Oscar. Similarly, Josefina Gabrielle played both Nickie and Ursula while Tiffany Graves played Helene. The production closed at the Theatre Royal Haymarket on 6 November 2010 despite being scheduled to run until January 2011. The 2011 Olivier Award nominations were announced on Monday 7 January 2011, and this production received three nominations: Best Revival of a Musical, Best Theatre Choreography for Stephen Mear and Best Supporting Actress in a Musical for Josefina Gabrielle.

=== 2014 Sydney and 2015 Australian tour ===
The show was the first production of the new Hayes Theatre in Potts Point, Sydney, Australia. Directed by Dean Bryant, and choreographed by Andrew Hallsworth, it starred Verity Hunt-Ballard as Charity, and Martin Crewes as Charlie, Vittorio and Oscar.

Verity Hunt-Ballard won the 2014 Helpmann Award for Best Female Actor in a Musical, while Dean Bryant and Andrew Hallsworth won the Helpmanns for Best Direction and Best Choreography, respectively. Martin Crewes was nominated for Best Male Actor, and Debora Krizak was nominated for Best Supporting Female. The show was nominated for Best Musical, and Andrew Worboys and Jessica James-Moody were nominated for Best Musical Direction and Best Sound Design, respectively. It also won several Sydney Theatre Awards for Best Production of a Musical, Best Performance by an Actress in a Leading Role in a Musical (Verity Hunt-Ballard) and Best Performance by an Actress in a Supporting Role in a Musical (Debora Krizak).

The critically acclaimed production transferred to Playhouse in the Sydney Opera House from 15 January 2015 to 8 February 2015.

It then toured to the Canberra Theatre Centre, Arts Centre Melbourne Playhouse and the Illawarra Performing Arts Centre in Wollongong.

=== 2015 London concert performances ===
In August 2015 Denise Van Outen performed the title role in concert performances of the musical at Cadogan Hall, with actor/singer Michael Xavier, ex-Girls Aloud band member Kimberley Walsh, West End star Kerry Ellis, and actors/singers Michael Simkins and Rodney Earl Clarke.

=== 2016 Off-Broadway ===
The musical was presented Off-Broadway by The New Group at the Pershing Square Signature Center, opening on November 20, 2016. Directed by Leigh Silverman with choreography by Joshua Bergasse, the cast stars Sutton Foster as Charity Hope Valentine, Asmeret Ghebremichael (Nickie), Shuler Hensley (Oscar), Emily Padgett (Helene), and Joel Perez.

=== 2019 Off-West End ===
In April 2019 The Donmar Warehouse revived the production for a limited run from 6 April 2019 to 8 June 2019. The production starred Anne Marie-Duff as Charity, Arthur Darvill as Oscar and a variety of guest actors to play Daddy Brubeck including Adrien Lester and Beverly Knight. This was Josie Rourke's last production as artistic director at The Donmar.

== Awards and nominations ==
=== Original Broadway production ===
Year	Award	Category	Nominee	Result
1966	Tony Award	Best Musical		Nominated
1966	Tony Award	Best Composer and Lyricist	Cy Coleman and Dorothy Fields	Nominated
1966	Tony Award	Best Performance by a Leading Actress in a Musical	Gwen Verdon	Nominated
1966	Tony Award	Best Performance by a Featured Actor in a Musical	John McMartin	Nominated
1966	Tony Award	Best Performance by a Featured Actress in a Musical	Helen Gallagher	Nominated
1966	Tony Award	Best Direction of a Musical	Bob Fosse	Nominated
1966	Tony Award	Best Choreography	Bob Fosse	Won
1966	Tony Award	Best Scenic Design	Robert Randolph	Nominated
1966	Tony Award	Best Costume Design	Irene Sharaff	Nominated

=== 1986 Broadway revival ===
Year	Award	Category	Nominee	Result
1986	Tony Award	Best Revival		Won
1986	Tony Award	Best Performance by a Leading Actress in a Musical	Debbie Allen	Nominated
1986	Tony Award	Best Performance by a Featured Actor in a Musical	Michael Rupert	Won
1986	Tony Award	Best Performance by a Featured Actress in a Musical	Bebe Neuwirth	Won
1986	Tony Award	Best Costume Design	Patricia Zipprodt	Won
1986	Drama Desk Award	Outstanding Actress in a Musical	Debbie Allen	Nominated
1986	Drama Desk Award	Outstanding Featured Actor in a Musical	Michael Rupert	Won
1986	Drama Desk Award	Outstanding Featured Actress in a Musical	Bebe Neuwirth	Nominated
1986	Drama Desk Award	Outstanding Director of a Musical	Bob Fosse	Nominated
1986	Drama Desk Award	Outstanding Orchestrations	Ralph Burns	Nominated

=== 2005 Broadway revival ===
Year	Award	Category	Nominee	Result
2005	Tony Award	Best Revival of a Musical		Nominated
2005	Tony Award	Best Performance by a Leading Actress in a Musical	Christina Applegate	Nominated
2005	Tony Award	Best Choreography	Wayne Cilento	Nominated
2005	Drama Desk Award	Outstanding Revival of a Musical		Nominated
2005	Drama Desk Award	Outstanding Actress in a Musical	Christina Applegate	Nominated
2005	Drama Desk Award	Outstanding Featured Actor in a Musical	Denis O'Hare	Won
2005	Drama Desk Award	Outstanding Set Design	Scott Pask	Nominated

=== 2009 London revival ===
Year	Award	Category	Nominee	Result
2011	Laurence Olivier Award	Best Musical Revival		Nominated
2011	Laurence Olivier Award	Best Performance in a Supporting Role in a Musical	Josefina Gabrielle	Nominated
2011	Laurence Olivier Award	Best Theatre Choreographer	Stephen Mear	Nominated

=== 2014 Sydney revival ===
Year	Award	Category	Nominee	Result
2014
2014	Helpmann Awards	Best Musical		Nominated
2014	Helpmann Awards	Best Direction of a Musical	Dean Bryant	Won
2014	Helpmann Awards	Best Choreography of a Musical	Andrew Hallsworth	Won
2014	Helpmann Awards	Best Female Actor in a Musical	Verity Hunt-Ballard	Won
2014	Helpmann Awards	Best Male Actor in a Musical	Martin Crewes	Nominated
2014	Helpmann Awards	Best Supporting Female Actor in a Musical	Debora Krizak	Nominated
2014	Helpmann Awards	Best Musical Direction	Andrew Worboys	Nominated
2014	Helpmann Awards	Best Sound Design	Jessica James-Moody	Nominated

=== 2016 Off-Broadway production ===
Year	Award ceremony	Category	Nominee	Result
2017	Drama Desk Awards	Outstanding Revival of a Musical		Nominated
2017	Drama Desk Awards	Outstanding Leading Actress in a Musical	Sutton Foster	Nominated
2017	Lucille Lortel Awards	Outstanding Revival		Nominated
2017	Lucille Lortel Awards	Outstanding Lead Actor in a Musical	Shuler Hensley	Nominated
2017	Lucille Lortel Awards	Outstanding Lead Actress in a Musical	Sutton Foster	Nominated
2017	Lucille Lortel Awards	Outstanding Featured Actor in a Musical	Joel Perez	Won
2017	Lucille Lortel Awards	Outstanding Featured Actress in a Musical	Asmeret Ghebremichael	Nominated
2017	Lucille Lortel Awards	Outstanding Choreographer	Joshua Bergasse	Nominated
2017	Outer Critics Circle Awards	Outstanding Featured Actor in a Musical	Shuler Hensley	Nominated

== Recordings ==
There are numerous recordings of the show's score available including:

- 1966 original Broadway cast recording, entered the Billboard 200 on 12th March 1966
- Film soundtrack recording
- 1986 Broadway cast recording with Debbie Allen and Bebe Neuwirth
- First complete recording of the show conducted by Martin Yates. This version includes the complete score with bonus tracks from the film's score
- 2005 Broadway cast recording starring Christina Applegate and Denis O'Hare
