= Verity Hunt-Ballard =

Australian actress and singer

Verity Hunt-Ballard is an Australian actress and singer, best known for roles in musical theatre.

Hunt-Ballard was born in Mt Gambier, South Australia and raised in Largs Bay. Her Northern Ireland-born father was a social worker and music therapist, and her mother a primary school teacher.

She studied at the Western Australian Academy of Performing Arts, graduating in 2003. Early roles include the casts of the musicals Eureka (2004), Jersey Boys and Metro Street (2009).

Hunt-Ballard is best known for performing the title roles in the original Australian cast of Mary Poppins (2010) and the Hayes Theatre revival of Sweet Charity (2014). For each role, she received the Helpmann Award for Best Female Actor in a Musical.She also performed in Vivid White (2017), and Funny Girl in Concert at The Opera House (2018).

She has a daughter Emmy-Lou with a partner, actor Scott Johnson.
