= Trevor Ashley =

Australian actor

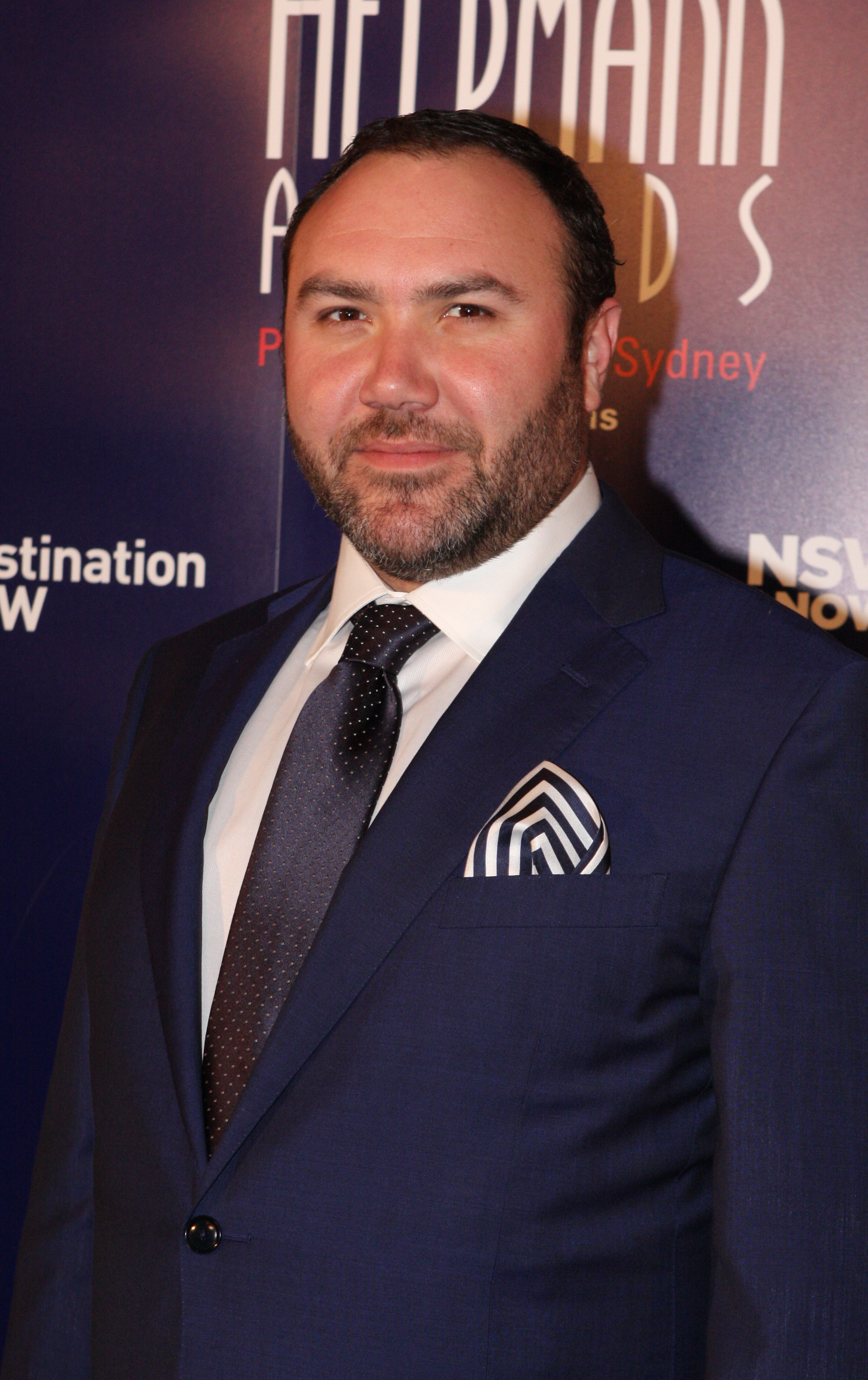
- Ashley at the 2015 Helpmann Awards
- Occupation: Actor
- Years active: 1998–present

Trevor Ashley is an Australian musical theatre actor, cabaret, and drag artist based in Sydney. He also has appeared on television in The Very Trevor Ashley Show.

== Early life and education ==
Ashley grew up in the south of Sydney and studied at the Shopfront a contemporary theatre. There he worked with Errol Bray, John Du Feu and playwright Hilary Bell. He appeared in Alice with Paul Capsis, and in Peter Pan with screen actor Bryan Brown.

Ashley attended Sydney Technical High School, where he studied music and drama, played in the school bands, and began writing orchestrations and arrangements. He was then chosen to be part of the Schools Spectacular, and the Talent Development Project under the direction of Mary Lopez. He graduated from high school in 1997.

== Career ==
=== Cabaret ===
Ashley made his professional debut in the Sydney Cabaret Convention 1998. His performance impressed both the critics and judges with the Cabaret Hotline calling him "A knockout performer… the clear crowd favourite and the only one to emulate a 'cabaret sensibility'". He then toured his show Trevor The Arena Mega Musical to New York City's Don't Tell Mama and The Talk of London, in England.

On return to Australia, he created the show Pop Princess with Phil Scott. He soon became "Mardi Gras Royalty" and followed up this with Pop Princess 2, two years later in 2005.

Priscilla film director Stephan Elliott then chose Ashley to sing the theme song to his 2008 film Easy Virtue, "Let's Misbehave". The film stars Colin Firth, Jessica Biel and Kristin Scott Thomas. After this, Ashley created and continued to host Showqueen, a weekly cabaret night at the Supper Club in Sydney. Showqueen featured special guests and notable cabaret performers, and also had a successful season in Melbourne. Previous guests have included Toni Lamond, iOTA, Virginia Gay, Genevieve Lemon and Matthew Robinson.

For Mardi Gras 2009, Ashley teamed with drag star Courtney Act to great acclaim in Gentlemen Prefer Blokes, a bawdy revue style show that ran in Sydney twice, and also played the Adelaide Cabaret Festival and a season at His Majesty's Theatre, Perth. Gentlemen Prefer Blokes had to be rewritten two weeks prior to the Sydney run after Courtney Act suffered a broken leg while skiing in Canada. Soap star Virginia Gay from Channel 7's All Saints joined the cast to play Courtney's body double.

I'm Every Woman, commissioned by the Sydney Opera House, paid tribute to Ashley's favourite divas living and dead. The show was nominated for a Sydney Theatre Award for Best Cabaret.

He has nominated for a Helpmann Award for Best Cabaret Performer for Diamonds are for Trevor in 2012, in which Ashley appeared as Shirley Bassey.

Liza (on a E), featuring his impersonation of Liza Minnelli, had seasons in Australian and the UK. In 2015, he announced a new cabaret show, entitled Liza's Back! (is broken), debuting at the Fairfax Studio, Arts Centre Melbourne from 21–31 January 2016.

He played Natalie Portly in his adult pantomime Fat Swan in 2012, a Black Swan parody written with longtime collaborator Phil Scott. His 2013 musical comedy Little Orphan trAshley starred Rhonda Burchmore and Gary Sweet.

=== Theatre ===
Ashley created the role of Miss Understanding in the original cast of Priscilla, Queen of the Desert: The Musical. He performed the role over 600 times in Sydney and Melbourne, and is featured on the original cast recording, singing "What's Love Got To Do With It?".

He performed in Jerry Springer: The Opera under the direction of Gale Edwards at the Sydney Opera House in 2009.

In 2010–2011, Ashley played the role of Edna Turnblad in Hairspray in Melbourne and Sydney.

In July 2012, Ashley appeared as Franz Leibkind in The Producers for The Production Company in Melbourne.

Ashley played Thenadier in the Australian 2014–2015 tour of Les Misérables, opposite Lara Mulcahy as Madame Thenadier. For this role, he was nominated for a Helpmann Award for Best Male Actor in a Supporting Role in a Musical and received a Best Supporting Performer in Music Theatre (male) Award at Sydney's 2015 Glugs Awards.

In 2015, Ashley directed the Australian premiere of Heathers: The Musical. The production was first staged at Hayes Theatre in Sydney for a 19-day run, and then was transferred the following year for short seasons in Brisbane, Melbourne and Sydney (with the latter being an encore production staged at the Sydney Opera House).

2017 saw Ashley play King Herod in the Australian revival of Jesus Christ Superstar, starring alongside Rob Mills as Christ. The production ran from 29 July to 13 August at Arts Centre Melbourne.

He played Roger De Bris in the Menier Chocolate Factory revival of The Producers, opening December 2024 in London. The production transferred to the Garrick Theatre in 2025. For his efforts Ashley was nominated for the Olivier Award for Best Actor in a Supporting Role in a Musical. As of May 2026 the show is scheduled to run through mid-September.

=== Television ===
In 2012, Australian network SBS announced it had commissioned a pilot called The Very Trevor Ashley Show. It was shown as a one-night-only program in May 2012.

Ashley stars in a recurring role as drag queen Dolly Hardon in Australian medical drama RFDS

In 2023, Ashley competed on the second season of Queen of the Universe and placed as the runner-up when the finale aired on 23 June 2023.

== Stage credits ==
Year	Production	Role
2006–2008	Priscilla, Queen of the Desert	Miss Understanding
2009	Jerry Springer: The Opera	Ensemble
2010–2011	Hairspray	Edna Turnblad
2011–2012	Fat Swan	Natalie Portly
2012	The Producers	Franz Leibkind
2013	Little Orphan trAshley	Orphan Fannie
2014–2015	Les Misérables	Thenardier
2017	Jesus Christ Superstar	King Herod
2017–2018	The Bodybag - The Panto	Rachel Marinade
2019 & 2021	The Lyin’ Queen	Gaye Wray
2022	Moulin Scrooge	Satôn
2023	Joseph and the Amazing Technicolor Dreamcoat	Pharaoh
2024-2026	The Producers	Roger De Bris
