= Helpmann Award for Best Female Actor in a Musical =

Annual Australian musical theatre award

- Awarded for: Best Female Actor in a Musical
- Location: Australia
- Presented by: Live Performance Australia
- Currently held by: Ursula Yovich for Barbara and the Camp Dogs (2019)
- Website: HelpmannAwards.com.au

The Helpmann Award for Best Female Actor in a Musical is a musical award, presented by Live Performance Australia (LPA) at the annual Helpmann Awards since 2001. This is a list of winners and nominations for the Helpmann Award for Best Female Actor in a Musical.

== Winners and nominees ==
Winners are listed first and marked in a separate colour.

=== 2000s ===
Year	Actor	Production	Character(s)
2001 (1st)
2001 (1st)	Sharon Millerchip	Chicago	Velma Kelly
2001 (1st)	Chrissy Amphlett	The Boy from Oz	Judy Garland
2001 (1st)	Lisa McCune	The Sound of Music	Maria Rainer
2001 (1st)	Leonie Page	Jolson	Ruby Keeler
2002 (2nd)
2002 (2nd)	Judi Connelli	Sweeney Todd: The Demon Barber of Fleet Street	Mrs. Lovett
2002 (2nd)	Deborah Conway	Always... Patsy Cline	Patsy Cline
2002 (2nd)	Lara Mulcahy	Mamma Mia!	Rosie
2002 (2nd)	Pamela Rabe	The Wizard of Oz	Wicked Witch of the West
2003 (3rd)
2003 (3rd)	Tamsin Carroll	Oliver!	Nancy
2003 (3rd)	Lisa McCune	Cabaret	Sally Bowles
2003 (3rd)	Caroline O'Connor	Man of La Mancha	Aldonza
2003 (3rd)	Marina Prior	The Witches of Eastwick	Jane Smart
2004 (4th)
2004 (4th)	Kate Hoolihan	We Will Rock You	Scaramouche
2004 (4th)	MaryAnne McCormack	The Full Monty	Georgie Bukatinsky
2004 (4th)	Ursula Yovich	The Threepenny Opera	Polly Peachum
2004 (4th)	Buyisile Zama	The Lion King	Rafiki
2005 (5th)
2005 (5th)	Chloe Dallimore	The Producers	Ulla
2005 (5th)	Bridget Boyle	The Venetian Twins	Beatrice
2005 (5th)	Emma Matthews	The Mikado	Yum-Yum
2005 (5th)	Lisa McCune	Urinetown	Hope Cladwell
2006 (6th)
2006 (6th)	Tamsin Carroll	Dusty – The Original Pop Diva	Dusty Springfield
2006 (6th)	Magda Szubanski	The 25th Annual Putnam County Spelling Bee	William Barfee
2006 (6th)	Marina Prior	The 25th Annual Putnam County Spelling Bee	Rona Lisa Peretti
2006 (6th)	Amanda Harrison	Leader of the Pack	Ellie Greenwich
2007 (7th)
2007 (7th)	Laurie Cadevida	Miss Saigon	Kim
2007 (7th)	Chrissy Amphlett	The Boy from Oz	Judy Garland
2007 (7th)	Sharon Millerchip	Pippin	Catherine
2007 (7th)	Silvie Paladino	Sideshow Alley	Rita
2008 (8th)
2008 (8th)	Genevieve Lemon	Billy Elliot the Musical	Mrs Wilkinson
2008 (8th)	Ana Marina	The Phantom of the Opera	Christine Daaé
2008 (8th)	Sharon Millerchip	Sweet Charity	Charity Hope Valentine
2008 (8th)	Marina Prior	Guys and Dolls	Miss Adelaide
2009 (9th)
2009 (9th)	Sharon Millerchip	Chicago	Roxanne "Roxie" Hart
2009 (9th)	Amanda Harrison	Wicked	Elphaba
2009 (9th)	Lucy Durack	Wicked	Glinda
2009 (9th)	Lucinda Shaw	Monty Python's Spamalot	Lady of the Lake

=== 2010s ===
Year	Actor	Production	Character(s)
2010 (10th)
2010 (10th)	Michala Banas	Avenue Q	Kate Monster and Lucy the Slut
2010 (10th)	Delia Hannah	Cats	Grizabella
2010 (10th)	Ursula Yovich	The Wizard Of Oz	Dorothy Gale
2010 (10th)	Christie Whelan	The Drowsy Chaperone	Janet van de Graaff
2011 (11th)
2011 (11th)	Verity Hunt-Ballard	Mary Poppins	Mary Poppins
2011 (11th)	Jemma Rix	Wicked	Elphaba
2011 (11th)	Jaz Flowers	Hairspray	Tracy Turnblad
2011 (11th)	Lucy Maunder	Doctor Zhivago	Lara
2012 (12th)
2012 (12th)	Pamela Rabe	Grey Gardens	Edith Bouvier Beale and "Little" Edie
2012 (12th)	Anita Louise Combe	A Chorus Line	Cassie
2012 (12th)	Amanda Harrison	An Officer and a Gentleman	Paula Pokrifki
2012 (12th)	Amy Lehpamer	Rock of Ages	Sherrie Christian
2013 (13th)
2013 (13th)	Lucy Durack	Legally Blonde	Elle Woods
2013 (13th)	Chloe Dallimore	The Addams Family	Morticia Addams
2013 (13th)	Esther Hannaford	King Kong	Ann Darrow
2013 (13th)	Silvie Paladino	Chess	Florence Vassey
2014 (14th)
2014 (14th)	Verity Hunt-Ballard	Sweet Charity	Charity
2014 (14th)	Lisa McCune	The King and I	Anna Leonowens
2014 (14th)	Caroline O'Connor	Gypsy	Rose
2014 (14th)	Phoebe Panaretos	Strictly Ballroom: The Musical	Fran
2015 (15th)
2015 (15th)	Caroline O'Connor	Anything Goes	Reno Sweeney
2015 (15th)	Patrice Tipoki	Les Misérables	Fantine
2015 (15th)	Helen Dallimore	Blood Brothers	Mrs Johnstone
2015 (15th)	Madeleine Jones	Once	Girl
2016 (16th)
2016 (16th)	Molly Barwick, Dusty Bursill, Tiana Mirra, Alannah Parfett, Sasha Rose, Georgia Taplin, Bella Thomas and Ingrid Torelli	Matilda the Musical	Matilda Wormwood
2016 (16th)	Amy Lehpamer	The Sound of Music	Maria Rainer
2016 (16th)	Antoinette Halloran	Sweeney Todd	Mrs Lovett
2016 (16th)	Esther Hannaford	Little Shop of Horrors	Audrey
2017 (17th)
2017 (17th)	Anna O'Byrne	My Fair Lady	Eliza Doolittle
2017 (17th)	Amy Lehpamer	Dusty	Dusty Springfield
2017 (17th)	Zahra Newman	The Book of Mormon	Nabulungi
2017 (17th)	Sophie Wright	Kinky Boots	Lauren
2018 (18th)
2018 (18th)	Esther Hannaford	Beautiful: The Carole King Musical	Carole King
2018 (18th)	Natalie O'Donnell	Mamma Mia!	Donna Sheridan
2018 (18th)	Marina Prior	Dream Lover: The Bobby Darin Musical	Polly and Mary Douvan
2018 (18th)	Maggie McKenna	Muriel's Wedding	Muriel Heslop
2019 (19th)
2019 (19th)	Ursula Yovich	Barbara and the Camp Dogs	Barbara
2019 (19th)	Luisa Scrofani	In the Heights	Nina
2019 (19th)	Tina Arena	Evita	Eva Peron
2019 (19th)	Natalie Abbott	Muriel's Wedding the Musical	Muriel Heslop

== See also ==
- Helpmann Awards
