= An Officer and a Gentleman (musical) =

An Officer and a Gentleman,
- The Musical
- UK artwork
- Book: Douglas Day Stewart; Sharleen Cooper Cohen
- Basis: 1982 film An Officer and a Gentleman
- Premiere: May 18, 2012: Lyric Theatre in Sydney, Australia
- Productions: 2012 Sydney; 2016 Silkeborg; 2018 UK tour 2021 US tour 2024 UK tour

An Officer and a Gentleman, The Musical is a stage musical adaptation of the 1982 film of the same name, written by Douglas Day Stewart.

== History ==
The world premiere production of An Officer and a Gentleman, The Musical was co-produced by John Frost and Sharleen Cooper Cohen. The book was written by Douglas Day Stewart and Sharleen Cooper Cohen, and the score was by Ken Hirsch and Robin Lerner. Directed by Simon Phillips, the musical starred Ben Mingay as Zack Mayo and Amanda Harrison as Paula Pokrifki. The production had its world premiere on May 18, 2012 at the Lyric Theatre in Sydney, Australia. The musical closed only six weeks later, on July 1.

A new version of the musical made its premiere at Curve in Leicester, UK, in April 2018 before touring the UK. It was directed by Nikolai Foster and used songs from the film's soundtrack such as "Up Where We Belong", "Girls Just Want to Have Fun", "Toy Soldiers", "Alone", "Don't Cry Out Loud" and "Material Girl", as opposed to the original score by Hirsch and Lerner used in the previous incarnation.

In 2019, a North American tour of An Officer and a Gentleman was announced, with a book adapted by Dick Scanlan, based on the version by Douglas Day Stewart and Sharleen Cooper Cohen. Choreography for this version was by Patricia Wilcox.

In 2024, the Curve production of the musical returned to the UK, again directed by Nikolai Foster. Starring Luke Baker as Zack Mayo, it opened on February 23 at The Alexandra in Birmingham.

== Reception ==
The Sydney production received mixed reviews. In response to a highly negative review in The Australian, calling the show a "bloodless facsimile" of the film, author Stewart published a rebuttal defending the production and attacking the critics for their "eclectic, overly intellectual point of view". When the show's closing was announced, producer John Frost told a reporter that an American tour was still a possibility, after revisions were made to the show.

The show was nominated for five Helpmann Awards including "Best Musical 2012". Bert LaBonte won for "Best Supporting Actor".

== Cast and characters ==
Character	Original Australia Cast	Original UK Tour Cast	Original US Tour Cast
Zack Mayo	Ben Mingay	Jonny Fines	Wes Williams
Paula Pokrifki	Amanda Harrison	Emma Williams	Mia Massaro
Sid Worley	Alex Rathgeber	Ian McIntosh	Cameron Loyal
Lynette Pomeroy	Kate Kendall	Jessica Daley	Emily Louis Franklin
Sgt. Emil Foley	Bert LaBonté	Ray Shell	David Wayne Britton
Byron Mayo*	Bartholomew John	Darren Bennett	Shelly Verden
Esther Pokrifki	Tara Morice	Rachel Stanley	Roxy York
Ramon Guiterrez	Josh Piterman		
Taniya Seegar*	Zahra Newman		Amaya White
Charlie Redding	Josef Brown		
Amy Cantrowitz	Sheridan Harbridge		
Young Zack Mayo	Michael Kilbane; Oliver Wright; Otis Pavlovic; George Cartwright		
Officer Candidates			Zare Anguay (Leung); William Carver (Perryman); Christopher Hanford (Greer); Kyler Hershman (McNamara); Nathaniel D. Lee (Watts); Blake Sauceda (Zuniga); Kevin Stevens (Cohen)

* The character Taniya Seegar was changed to Casey Seegar in the US Touring production.

* The character Byron Mayo was changed to Zack's Dad in the US Touring production.

== Recordings ==
A promotional disc of five songs was released including "Up Where We Belong", performed by Ben Mingay, Amanda Harrison, Kate Kendall and Alex Rathgeber, and "If You Believe In Love", sung by Amanda Harrison.

== Awards and nominations ==
Year	Award	Category	Nominee	Result
2012	Helpmann Awards	Best Musical	Sharleen Cooper Cohen, John Frost	Nominated
2012	Helpmann Awards	Best Direction of a Musical	Simon Phillips	Nominated
2012	Helpmann Awards	Best Choreography in a Musical	Andrew Hallsworth	Nominated
2012	Helpmann Awards	Best Female Actor in a Musical	Amanda Harrison	Nominated
2012	Helpmann Awards	Best Male Actor in a Supporting Role in a Musical	Bert LaBonte	Won
2012	Theatre People Pro Choice	Best Actress	Amanda Harrison	Nominated
2012	Theatre People Pro Choice	Best Supporting Actor	Bert LaBonte	Nominated
2012	Theatre People Pro Choice	Best Supporting Actor	Alex Rathgeber	Nominated
2012	Theatre People Pro Choice	Best Director	Simon Phillips	Nominated
2012	Theatre People Pro Choice	New Musical	Sharleen Cooper Cohen, John Frost	Nominated
