= The Butterfly Club =

Coordinates: 37°50′3″S 144°57′37″E

The Butterfly Club was a performing arts venue in Melbourne, Victoria, Australia. The club was conceived and created by artist and entrepreneur, Matthew Grant. The building was opened to the public in 1999. Grant sold the club in November 2003. The venue draws upon a growing interest in cabaret. By 2006, the club was Melbourne's only full-time cabaret venue.

The Butterfly Club presented over 1,000 artists, with performers including Tim Minchin and Eddie Perfect.

The club, together with The Australian National Academy of Music, played a role in developing the Melbourne Cabaret Festival.

In December 2012, The Butterfly Club announced it was planning to relocate to a building on Carson Pl. In conjunction with this relocation, a fundraising effort was launched, through crowdfunding and social media campaigns, as well as media coverage, under the tagline 'Save The Butterfly Club.'

Following the relocation, The Butterfly Club began trading from its new home, in the Melbourne CBD, in February 2013.

The Butterfly Club closed indefinitely on the 27th of July, 2025. The venue's programming director announced via email to the artists who were scheduled to perform at the venue that the closure was due to "sudden and unforeseen operational complications."
