= Eggner Trio =

Piano trio from Vienna, Austria

The Eggner Trio is a piano trio from Vienna. The members are three brothers: Georg Eggner (violin), Florian Eggner (cello), and Christoph Eggner (piano). The trio performs and records a range of classical and modern chamber works. It has appeared in such distinguished venues as Wigmore Hall in London and the Concertgebouw in Amsterdam, and in 2003 won the Melbourne International Chamber Music Competition.

== Performance ==
Since the brothers founded the Eggner Trio in 1997, it has appeared throughout Europe, in Japan, Argentina, Uruguay, the United States and quite frequently in Australia and New Zealand. International festivals in which they have performed include the Kissinger Summer, the Schubertiade in Schwarzenberg, the Heidelberger Frühling and the Chamber Music Festival in Lockenhaus.

The trio received international recognition in 2003 when they won the Melbourne International Chamber Music Competition in Australia. In 2006, through the European Concert Hall Organisation "Rising Stars" series, they played concerts in such venues as Carnegie Hall, Cité de la Musique in Paris, the Festspielhaus Baden-Baden, the Philharmonie in Cologne, the Mozarteum concert hall in Salzburg and the Musikverein in Vienna.

== Recordings ==
Recordings with Live Classics include the Beethoven Trio in D Major op. 70 Nr. 1 (Ghost Trio), the Archduke Trio in B-flat Major op. 97 (This CD was awarded the Golden Label 2007/08 by the Belgian classical music website "Klassiek Centraal"), and Mendelssohn’s Trio in D minor, op. 49, and Trio in C minor op. 66.

With Gramola they have recorded both piano trios by Shostakovich, the Iván Erőd Trio op. 21, the CD “Kaleidoskop” with modern works by Austrian composers (Johannes Berauer, Sascha Peres, and Gerrit Wunder), Brahms’ Trio Nr. 2 in C Major op. 87, and Clara Schumann’s Trio in G minor op. 17 (This CD was awarded the Pasticciopreis in Radio Austria 1 in June 2013).

== Solo work ==
The three brothers have also played as soloists in the triple concertos of Ludwig van Beethoven and Bohuslav Martinu, performing with the Orchestra Filarmonica dell‘Umbria (Italy), the Tasmanian Symphony Orchestra (Australia), the South Bohemian Chamber Philharmonic of Budweis (Czech Republic), and the Tonkünstler Orchestra (Austria). Georg Eggner performs on a violin built by Giovanni Pistucci (1895), and Florian Eggner on a cello by Carl Richter (1907).

== Members ==
Christoph Eggner, piano, is a multiple winner of competitions and studied with Paul Badura-Skoda and Oleg Maisenberg at the University of Music and Performing Arts, Vienna, as well as Brigitte Engerer and Michel Béroff at the Conservatoire national supérieur de musique et de danse de Paris. He received the Merit Scholarship from the Alban Berg Foundation. Since 2000 he is the assistant for Oleg Maisenberg at the University of Music and Performing Arts, Vienna.

Georg Eggner, violin, won first prizes in the national competitions Jugend Musiziert, Prima La Musica (Austria), as well as the international competition Concorso Internationale di Musica per I Giovani, Stresa (Italy), and "ORF-violin" 2001. After eleven years of lessons with Boris Kushnir, he studied with Günter Pichler of the University of Music and Performing Arts Vienna. He received scholarships from the Alban Berg Foundation, the Dürr Foundation and the Tokyo Foundation.

Florian Eggner, cello, was the first prize winner of the Austrian Federal Competition Prima La Musica in 1996. He studied with Wolfgang Herzer (former principal cellist of the Vienna Philharmonic) and Stefan Kropfitsch at the University of Music and Performing Arts Vienna, and Clemens Hagen at the Mozarteum in Salzburg.
