= Pratt Foundation =

Australian organization

The Pratt Foundation is an Australian philanthropic organisation based in Melbourne and established in 1978 by Jeanne and Richard Pratt.

According to its Values Statement, it has "the shared vision of supporting charitable enterprises and adding value to philanthropy". The Pratt Foundation claims to be one of the largest private sources of philanthropy in Australia. Its chief executive is Melbourne journalist Sam Lipski, and Heloise Waislitz is its chair.

The Pratt Foundation has notably funded the environmental group The Wilderness Society. The society has been outspoken in its efforts to derail a proposed pulp mill from the Tasmanian timber company Gunns.

Son of entrepreneur Richard Pratt, Anthony Pratt has pledged to give away $1 billion to charity through the Pratt Foundation before he dies. “This central commitment to the Australian Jewish community, Israel, and world Jewry will continue as the Pratt Foundation develops its social investment and philanthropy programs in the light of Anthony Pratt’s pledge.”, said Anthony.
