= Silvie Paladino =

Australian singer (born 1971)

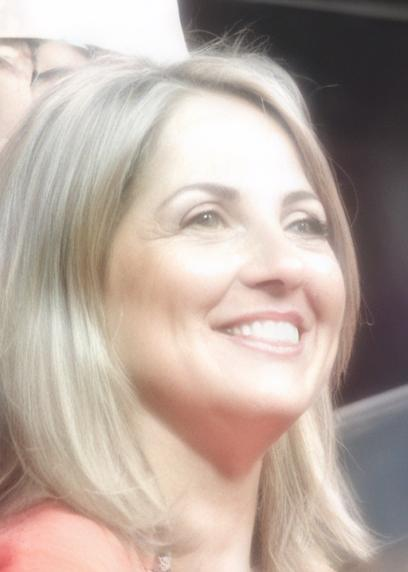
- Paladino in 2025

Background information
- Born: 18 August 1971 (age 54)
- Origin: Melbourne, Australia
- Genres: West End, Contemporary Christian, Adult contemporary
- Occupations: Singer, actress
- Years active: 1989–present
- Website: silviepaladino.com

Silvie Paladino (born 18 August 1971) is an Australian soprano, notable for her roles in musical theatre, as well as a concert performer.

== Early and personal life ==
Born in Melbourne, Paladino began singing at the age of nine, learning at an inner-Melbourne music school, and from an early age won several major singing competitions, including the Italian Song Festival and the grand final of variety TV show Young Talent Time.

== Career ==
During 1989, Paladino was offered the role of Éponine in Les Misérables as an eighteen-year-old. She was nominated for Best Supporting Actress in the 1991 Melbourne Green Room Award for her performance. Paladino continued performing the role for a further twelve months touring Australia and New Zealand to critical acclaim. She received the same recognition in 1992 when she accepted an invitation to perform the role of Éponine on the West End in the London production of Les Misérables. In 1997, Paladino was invited to return to London where she performed the role of Fantine in Les Misérables for two years.

Paladino's other Australasian credits include the role of Jeannie in the Australian tour of Hair, the role of Grizabella in the Australian and Asian tour of Cats and since then has recreated the role in both Sydney and Kuala Lumpur. In 1995 Paladino appeared as Ellen in Cameron Mackintosh's Australian premiere of Miss Saigon at Sydney's Capitol Theatre. For this role she received a nomination for Best Supporting Artist in the Mo Awards.

In 2001, Paladino toured with her one-woman show Silvie Paladino Sings Streisand, and was nominated for a Green Room Award. She released a live CD of this performance.

Paladino played the lead role of Donna in Mamma Mia! throughout Australia and Asia.

In 2007, Paladino played the leading role of Rita in the world premiere of Sideshow Alley for McPherson Ink, for which she was nominated for a Helpmann Award for Best Female Actor in a Musical.

Paladino signed a recording deal with Universal Music Australia and released a Christmas album, Christmas List on 24 November 2007, which features songs from her performances at previous Carols by Candlelight.

For The Production Company in Melbourne, Paladino's roles include Lady Thiang in The King and I in 2010, Florency Vassey in Chess directed by Gale Edwards in 2012, and Jerry's Girls in 2015.

In 2022, she was in a production of Cinderella. In 2024, she was the alternate to Sarah Brightman's Norma Desmond in the Australian production of Lloyd Webber's Sunset Boulevard in Melbourne and Sydney, garnering better reviews than Brightman.

== TV appearances ==
Apart from her theatrical credits, she is well known to Australian audiences through her regular appearances on variety shows like Good Morning Australia, Denise, The Midday Show, In Melbourne Tonight, and Hey Hey It's Saturday. Paladino is also a regular performer at Carols by Candlelight at the Sidney Myer Music Bowl, and has featured at many special events such as the worldwide telecast of the National Rugby League (NRL) Grand Final in Sydney, the 2005 Australian Football League Grand Final in Melbourne with the national anthem "Advance Australia Fair", and the V8 Supercar Championships at Phillip Island.

== Concert performances ==
Paladino's concert performances include lead artist with Melbourne Symphony Orchestra, Sydney Symphony Orchestra, West Australian Symphony Orchestra, Melbourne Opera, Australian Philharmonic Orchestra, State Orchestra of Victoria and Tasmanian Symphony Orchestra. She has toured with Bangkok Symphony Orchestra in a series of concerts in Thailand. Paladino completed a national tour as a special guest star with international crooner Patrizio Buanne. In 2026, she toured Australia with Marina Prior, David Hobson and Michael Cormick in Ovation.

== Awards ==
Year	Award	Category	Production	Role	Result
1991	Green Room Award	Actress in a Supporting Role – Music Theatre	Les Misérables	Éponine	Nominated
1991	Green Room Award	Cabaret	Silvie Paladino Sings Streisand		Nominated
2007	Helpmann Award	Best Female Actor in a Musical	Sideshow Alley	Rita	Nominated
2012	Green Room Award	Actress in a Leading Role – Music Theatre	Chess	Florence Vassey	Won
2012	Helpmann Award	Best Female Actor in a Musical	Chess	Florence Vassey	Nominated
