= Rob Guest =

NZ-Australian actor

Rob Guest OBE
- Born: Robert John Guest; 17 July 1950; Birmingham, Warwickshire, England
- Died: 1 October 2008 (aged 58); Melbourne, Victoria, Australia
- Resting place: Macquarie Park Cemetery and Crematorium
- Occupations: Musical theatre performer; actor; singer; television host
- Spouse(s): Judy Guest (married, 1994–2002 separated); Lynette Perry (divorced)
- Partner: Kellie Dickerson
- Children: 2
- Awards: Benny Award (1993); Korean Song Festival Best Male Vocalist; New Zealand Performer of the Year (1979); New Zealand Male Theatrical Performer of the Year (1988)

Robert John Guest OBE (17 July 1950 – 1 October 2008) was a British-born New Zealand-Australian actor, television personality and host and singer, who started his career in pop music in New Zealand, before becoming best known for his work in Australian musical theatre, particularly in various productions of The Phantom of the Opera. He played the lead for a record-breaking 2,289 performances over seven years, more than any other performer.

== Biography ==
Guest was born in Birmingham, England. He moved to New Zealand with his family when he was 13, and later moved to Canada where he was in a band called The Apparition. The family returned to New Zealand and in 1968 Guest joined the band The Shore Thing who relaunched in 1969 as the Apparition. In 1970 Guest joined The In-Betweens as their vocalist. He signed with Polydor records in 1972 and released his debut single "House of Cards" written by Lynsey de Paul and Barry Blue.

Guest appeared on the New Zealand radio charts and starred for many years on television shows including Happen Inn. He also appeared in the Hamilton Operatic Society's productions of Half a Sixpence and Joseph and the Amazing Technicolor Dreamcoat, reprising the lead role for the Rotorua Operatic Society, for which he also played the lead in Jesus Christ Superstar. Guest won his first lead at age 22 in The Jesus Christ Revolution (which was presented as Man of Sorrows in New Zealand and which predated Jesus Christ Superstar). After performing his hit songs all around the world, Guest won the 1978 Korean Song Festival Best Male Vocalist trophy, recorded a special for the Canadian Broadcasting Corporation, and was voted the 1979 New Zealand 'Professional Performer of the Year'.

In 1981 Guest moved to the United States with his first wife, Lynette Perry, where he spent most of the 1980s performing and hosting shows in Las Vegas, Atlantic City, Reno, Nevada and Lake Tahoe. In 1985 Guest won the FIDOF Award in Los Angeles for his performance at the World Song Festival. He returned to New Zealand, opened a photographic studio, while continuing to moonlight as a performer. In 1988, he was named New Zealand's male theatrical performer of the year.

Guest moved to Australia after he was cast as Jean Valjean in the Australian production of Les Misérables, following Normie Rowe's portrayal, and spent three-and-a-half years touring Australia and New Zealand in the role; Guest also received a Green Room Award for Best Male Performer in a Leading Role. Guest then followed Anthony Warlow in the title role in The Phantom of the Opera from December 1991 to September 1998.

Guest was the world's longest-serving Phantom, having played the role a record 2,289 performances over seven years in front of Australian and New Zealand audiences.

During this time in 1994 he also hosted the Australian version of German game show Man O Man.

In 1995, Guest was invited as one of the seventeen Jean Valjeans from around the world to perform the encore of the Les Misérables 10th Anniversary Concert at the Royal Albert Hall in London. He later reprised the role of Valjean in 1998–99 for the Australasian 10th-anniversary production.

In 1993 Guest received the Benny Award from the Variety Artists Club of New Zealand Inc, the highest honour available to a New Zealand variety entertainer.

In the 1994 New Zealand New Year Honours, Guest was appointed an Officer of the Order of the British Empire, for services to entertainment. His first marriage had ended in divorce, and in 1994 he married the singer Judy Barnes. They had two children, but separated in 2001.

Following his work in The Phantom of the Opera and Les Misérables, Guest performed in a number of other high-profile theatre roles, including Al Jolson in Jolson, Captain von Trapp in The Sound of Music, Rev Shaw Moore (baritone) in Footloose, and Professor Harold Hill in The Music Man. Guest performed numerous gala performances both in Australia and internationally, twice hosting Carols in the Domain, and also releasing four gold-selling albums.

== Death ==
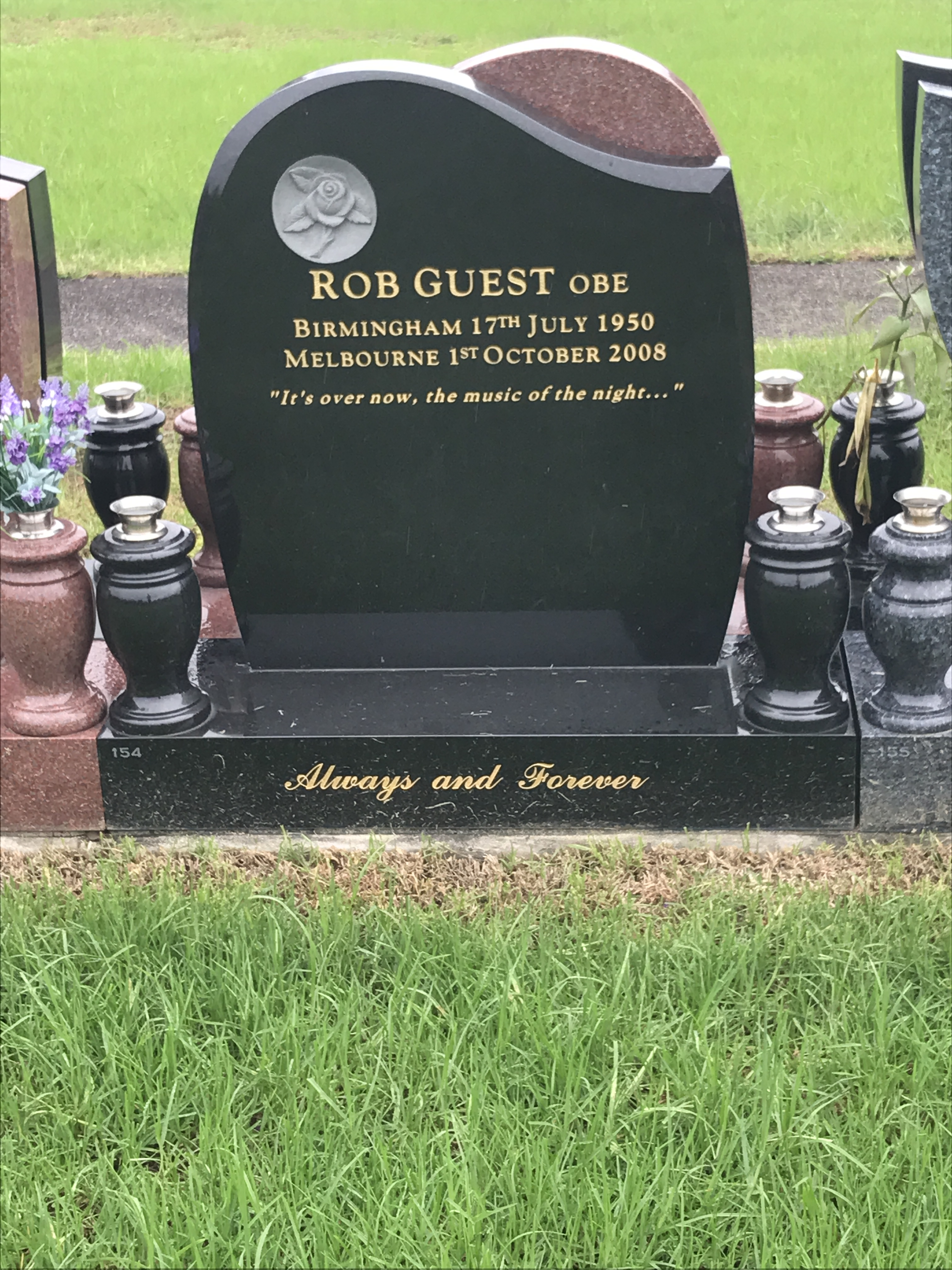
Guest's grave at Macquarie Park

On the evening of 30 September 2008, Guest was taken to St Vincent's Hospital, Melbourne, after suffering a stroke. He died on the morning of 1 October 2008 with his partner Kellie Dickerson, Judy Barnes and their children Christopher and Amy and best friend Greg Smart by his side. At the time of his death, Guest was appearing as the Wizard of Oz in the Australian premiere production of the hit Broadway musical Wicked, which had opened in Melbourne in July 2008. Kellie Dickerson was the show's musical director at the time. A public memorial was held for Guest at the Regent Theatre on 13 October 2008, featuring speeches and musical performances by his friends and co-stars from various shows. Bert Newton was brought in as his replacement in Wicked, six weeks following his death.

Guest was buried at Macquarie Park Cemetery and Crematorium, Macquarie Park, New South Wales.

== Discography ==
=== Albums ===
List of albums, with Australian chart positions
Title	Album details	Peak chart positions
Title	Album details	AUS
Dedication	Released: 1979; Format: LP; Label: Festival Records (L 36686)	-
Standing Ovation	Released: 1991; Format: CD, Cassette; Label: EMI Music (798621-2)	56
Unmasked	Released: 1997; Format: CD; Label: Thom Marketing (488648-2)	93
The Magic of Christmas	Released: November 1998; Format: CD; Label: Thom Marketing (5599252)	-

== Performances ==
- Jekyll & Hyde as Dr. Henry Jekyll/Mr. Edward Hyde
- Jesus Christ Superstar as Jesus Christ
- Jolson as Al Jolson
- Joseph and the Amazing Technicolor Dreamcoat as Joseph
- Les Misérables as Jean Valjean
- Pippin as Pippin
- The Music Man as Harold Hill
- The Phantom of the Opera as The Phantom of the Opera
- The Sound of Music as Captain Von Trapp
- Sweeney Todd: The Demon Barber of Fleet Street as Sweeney Todd
- Wicked as The Wonderful Wizard of Oz

Guest died whilst performing in Wicked

== Honours and awards ==
- Officer of the Order of the British Empire (OBE), 31 December 1993
- Entertainer of the Year
- Recording Artist of the Year
- Theatrical Performer of the Year
- Benny Award Winner from the Variety Artists Club of New Zealand Inc
- Shure Gold Microphone Award from the Variety Artists Club of New Zealand Inc
- Green Room Awards – Best Male Theatrical Performer – Jean Valjean
- Best Performance Award – Los Angeles – Los Angeles Song Festival
- F.I.D.O.F Award. Seoul Korea
- Helpmann Award for Best Male Actor in a Supporting Role in a Musical – Wicked

== The Rob Guest Endowment ==
In recognition of Guest's achievements in the musical theatre industry, ANZ Trustees established a memorial fund in his honour to help emerging young performers in musical theatre. The Rob Guest Endowment is awarded each year to an emerging musical theatre performer selected by a panel of industry experts. The award will provide the emerging performer with further knowledge and training in the industry to develop their potential. 2009 saw the Endowment created, the competition launched and the inaugural concert staged at Her Majesty's Theatre, Melbourne. Recipients of the endowment have been Danielle Matthews (2009), Francine Cain (2010), Blake Bowden (2011), Glen Hill (2012), Samantha Leigh Dodemaide (2013) and Josh Robson (2014). 2014 saw the inclusion of two more awards, each offering a prize of $10,000. The Sue Natrass Award, won by Isabelle Stadler in 2014 for a member of a musical theatre technical team. The Brian Stacey Award for a musician currently working in the field of musical theatre was won by Isaac Hayward.

Rob Guest Endowment Awards
Date	Gala Concert Venue	Host	Judges	Award	Recipient
2009	Her Majesty's Theatre, Melbourne			The Rob Guest Endowment	Danielle Matthews
2010				The Rob Guest Endowment	Francine Cain
2011				The Rob Guest Endowment	Blake Bowden
19 November 2012	Her Majesty's Theatre Melbourne	Bert Newton, Rob Mills and Lucy Durack	Kellie Dickerson, Guy Simpson, Jason Coleman and Stuart Maunder	The Rob Guest Endowment	Glen Hill
25 November 2013	Lyric Theatre, Sydney	Bert Newton	Jason Coleman, Kellie Dickerson, Stuart Maunder and Stephen Oremus	The Rob Guest Endowment	Samantha Leigh Dodemaide
2014	Capitol Theatre Sydney	Bert Newton and Lucy Durack	Todd McKenney, Stuart Maunder and Guy Simpson	The Rob Guest Endowment	Josh Robson
2014	Capitol Theatre Sydney	Bert Newton and Lucy Durack	Todd McKenney, Stuart Maunder and Guy Simpson	The Sue Natrass Award	Isabelle Stadler
2014	Capitol Theatre Sydney	Bert Newton and Lucy Durack	Todd McKenney, Stuart Maunder and Guy Simpson	The Brian Stacey Award	Isaac Hayward
2014	Capitol Theatre Sydney	Bert Newton and Lucy Durack	Todd McKenney, Stuart Maunder and Guy Simpson	The Playbill Future Prospect Award	Daniel Assetta
9 November 2015	Lyric Theatre, Sydney	David Campbell and Lucy Durack	Kelley Abbey, Peter Casey and Gale Edwards	The Rob Guest Endowment	Daniel Assetta
9 November 2015	Lyric Theatre, Sydney	David Campbell and Lucy Durack	Kelley Abbey, Peter Casey and Gale Edwards	The Sue Natrass Award	Drew Cipollone
9 November 2015	Lyric Theatre, Sydney	David Campbell and Lucy Durack	Kelley Abbey, Peter Casey and Gale Edwards	The Brian Stacey Award	Jack Drew
9 November 2015	Lyric Theatre, Sydney	David Campbell and Lucy Durack	Kelley Abbey, Peter Casey and Gale Edwards	The Playbill Future Prospect Award	Rubin Matters
9 November 2015	Lyric Theatre, Sydney	David Campbell and Lucy Durack	Kelley Abbey, Peter Casey and Gale Edwards	The Melbourne East End Theatre District Artist Development Award	Robert McDougall
14 November 2016	Lyric Theatre, Sydney	Lucy Durack and Penny McNamee	Kelley Abbey, Andrew Pole, Guy Simpson, Michael James Scott		
14 November 2016	Lyric Theatre, Sydney	Lucy Durack and Penny McNamee	Kelley Abbey, Andrew Pole, Guy Simpson, Michael James Scott	The Rob Guest Endowment	Linden Furnell
14 November 2016	Lyric Theatre, Sydney	Lucy Durack and Penny McNamee	Kelley Abbey, Andrew Pole, Guy Simpson, Michael James Scott	The Sue Natrass Award	Ash Kurrle
14 November 2016	Lyric Theatre, Sydney	Lucy Durack and Penny McNamee	Kelley Abbey, Andrew Pole, Guy Simpson, Michael James Scott	The Brian Stacey Award	Emma Ford
14 November 2016	Lyric Theatre, Sydney	Lucy Durack and Penny McNamee	Kelley Abbey, Andrew Pole, Guy Simpson, Michael James Scott	The Playbill Future Prospect Award	Kieran McGrath
14 November 2016	Lyric Theatre, Sydney	Lucy Durack and Penny McNamee	Kelley Abbey, Andrew Pole, Guy Simpson, Michael James Scott	The Melbourne East End Theatre District Artist Development Award	Genevieve Kingsford
