= Lucy Durack =

Australian actress (born 1982)

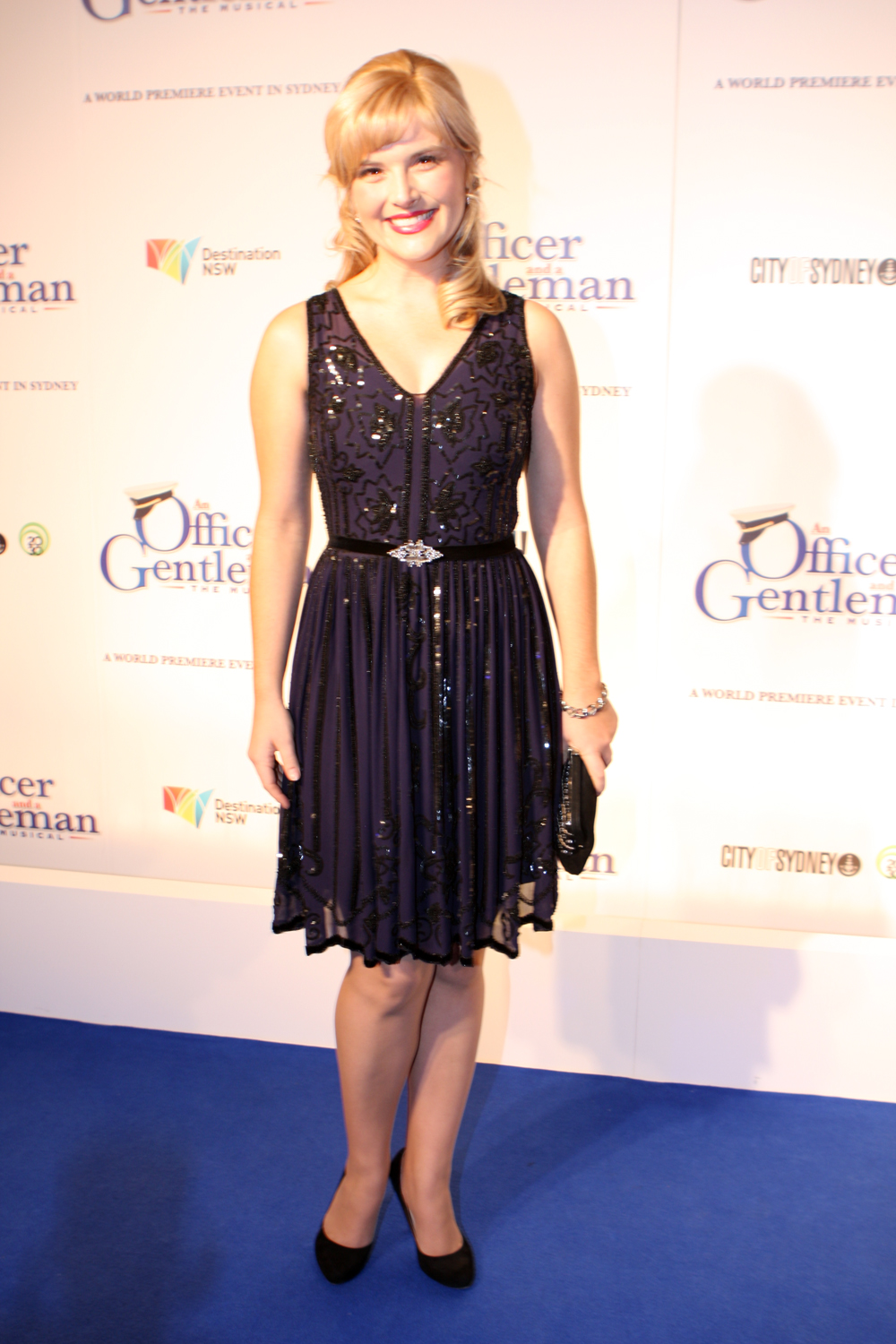
- Durack in 2012
- Born: 17 November 1982 (age 43); Perth, Western Australia, Australia
- Occupations: Actress; singer
- Years active: 2004–present
- Television: Australia’s Got Talent
- Spouse: Christopher Horsey (m. 2014)
- Children: 2

Lucy Durack (born 17 November 1982) is an Australian actress, singer and television personality who played Glinda in the Australian production of Wicked, and Elle Woods in the Australian production of Legally Blonde: The Musical. She starred as Tugger in Australian television drama Doctor Doctor in 2016 and as Roxy Karibas in Sisters in 2017.

== Early life ==
Born in Perth, Durack graduated from the Western Australian Academy of Performing Arts (WAAPA) with a Bachelor of Arts (Music Theatre) and prior to graduating was cast in the Brisbane and Sydney seasons of Mamma Mia! in which she understudied and performed the role of Sophie.

== Career ==
Durack has played the roles of Peggy Sawyer in 42nd Street, Miss Dorothy in the Australian Premiere of Thoroughly Modern Millie, Lois Lane/Bianca in Kiss Me, Kate, Rikki Rose in Respect, Sybil Chase in Noël Coward's Private Lives, and Laurey in Oklahoma!.

Durack's screen credits include the role of Cherry in the feature Goddess, Bunny in Southern Star/UKTV telemovie Dripping in Chocolate, Cassie Bennett on Channel Seven's headLand, All Saints, Rush II, Spicks and Specks, Parlami d'Amore, the Australian feature film Finding Nigel and the worldwide broadcast of the BBC2 Voice of Musical Theatre Competition in Cardiff in which she was a finalist. Durack is a frequent guest presenter on Channel Seven's Absolutely Melbourne. While regularly performing in concert with various orchestras throughout Australia, Durack's cabaret appearances include Immaculate Confection with collaborator Matthew Lee Robinson which toured to Sydney, Melbourne, Perth, Tasmania and the Adelaide Cabaret Festival, All Star Cabaret for the Sydney Theatre Company, Cavalcade for His Majesty's Theatre, Perth, and the 2003 Sydney Cabaret Convention for which she received the Judges' Award.

Durack is known for playing the role of Glinda in the Australian production of Wicked. After previews began in June 2008, the show opened on 12 July at the Regent Theatre in Melbourne. It closed on 9 August 2009, and transferred to the Capitol Theatre in Sydney, where it ran from 5 September 2009 through 26 September 2010. After a short break, Durack began performances on the show's Australian National Tour which began 25 January 2011 in Brisbane (running to 2 April). It moved to Adelaide from 14 April to 4 June 2011, and played Perth from 19 June through 11 September 2011. She has co-starred alongside Amanda Harrison, Jemma Rix, Pippa Grandison, Maggie Kirkpatrick, Bert Newton, Rob Guest, Rob Mills and Anthony Callea.

Durack sang the National Anthem at the AFL Grand Final and at Oaks Day as part of Melbourne's Spring Racing Carnival and performing on Channel 9's Carols By Candlelight and Channel Seven's Carols in the Domain, all as part of the cast of Wicked.

At the end of the Australian tour of Wicked which took place on 11 September 2011 in Perth, Durack moved on from her four-year role of Glinda to Melbourne for rehearsal of the new Australian production of Strange Bedfellows, where she played the role of the mayor's daughter, Faith. Durack passed the role of Glinda onto Suzie Mathers. When Wicked returned to Australia in 2014, Durack once again played the role of Glinda beginning with the Melbourne season in May 2014. In March 2012, it was announced that Durack would play the main character, Elle Woods in the Australian production of Legally Blonde, which also feature her Wicked co-stars Rob Mills and David Harris as Warner Huntington III and Emmett Forrest respectively. The Australian production season began in September 2012 at the Lyric Theatre, Sydney, before opening on 4 October 2012. It then went on to play at the Lyric Theatre in Brisbane from March 2013. It opened in Melbourne at the Princess Theatre in May 2013. Lucy won the Helpmann Award for Best Female Actor in a Musical for her work in Legally Blonde.

Durack completed filming the role of Katie Morgan in the film Now Add Honey in September 2013 playing the fiancée of Hamish Blake and sister of Portia De Rossi.

Durack's debut self-titled album was released on 28 September 2012. Beginning 2017, Durack portrays Glinda the Good Witch in the Australian tour of The Wizard of Oz.

In 2019, Durack was announced as one of the new judges for the ninth season of Australia’s Got Talent alongside Shane Jacobson, Manu Feildel and Nicole Scherzinger and new host Ricki-Lee. However in 2022, it was revealed that Durack would not return to the judging panel for the tenth season. She was replaced by actress and children’s author Kate Ritchie.

In January 2020, Durack portrayed Princess Fiona in the Australian production of Shrek The Musical in Sydney before transferring to Melbourne. However, due to the COVID-19 pandemic, the Melbourne run was cut short, with the final performance being on 26 March.

In August 2020, Durack was revealed to be the 'Cactus' in the second season of The Masked Singer Australia. She was the seventh contestant eliminated from the show, placing 6th overall.

== Filmography ==
=== Film ===
Year	Title	Role	Notes
2009	Remembering Nigel	Lucy Durack	
2012	Dripping in Chocolate	Bunny	TV Movie
2013	Goddess	Cherry	
2015	Now Add Honey	Katie Halloway	Main role
2016	Comedy Showroom: The Letdown	Sophie	TV Movie
2020	Daisy Quokka: World's Scariest Animal	Mum Quokka	
2022	A Perfect Pairing	Audra	

=== Television ===
Year	Title	Role	Notes	ref
2005	All Saints	Emma Christian	1 episode	
2006	HeadLand	Cassie / Vicki	2 episodes	
2009	Rush	Fiona	1 episode	
2014	The Moody's	Nicola	1 episode	
2016–2017	Doctor Doctor	Tugger	9 episodes	
2016	Upper Middle Bogan	Michelle	1 episode	
2016–2017	Here Come the Habibs	Judy		
2017–2019	The Letdown	Sophie	10 episode	
2017	Have You Been Paying Attention?	Herself	Guest quiz master	
2017	Sisters	Roxy Karibas	7 episodes	
2018	Show Me the Movie!	Herself	1 episode	
2018	How to Stay Married	Hernandez	1 episode	
2019	Delete History		Series	
2019	Lift	Olivia	Series	
2019	Show Me The Movie	Self	1 episode	
2019	Celebrity Name Game		2 episodes	
2019	Australia's Got Talent	Judge		
2019	Hard Quiz	Herself	Celebrity contestant	
2020	Love in Lockdown	Georgie	6 episodes	
2020	At Home Alone Together	Stephanie	2 episodes	
2020–2021	Neighbours	Rose Walker	28 episodes	
2020	The Masked Singer Australia	Cactus/herself	Contestant	
2022	Fisk	SOS Choir	1 episode	
2022	The Cook Up with Adam Liaw	Self	3 episodes	
2025	Claire Hooper's House Of Games	Contestant	5 episodes	
2026	Ground Up	Angela	TV series	

=== Awards ===
Year	Award ceremony	Category	Role	Production	Result	Ref
2008	Green Room Awards	Best Leading Actress in a Musical	Glinda	Wicked	Nominated	
2009	Helpmann Awards	Best Female Actor in a Musical	Glinda	Wicked	Nominated	
2009	Sydney Theatre Awards	Judith Johnson Award for Best Actress in a Leading Role in a Musical	Glinda	Wicked	Nominated	
2012	Sydney Theatre Awards	Elle Woods	Legally Blonde	Judith Johnson Award for Best Actress in a Leading Role in a Musical	Won	
2013	Helpmann Awards	Best Female Actor in a Musical	Legally Blonde	Elle Woods	Won	

== Personal life ==
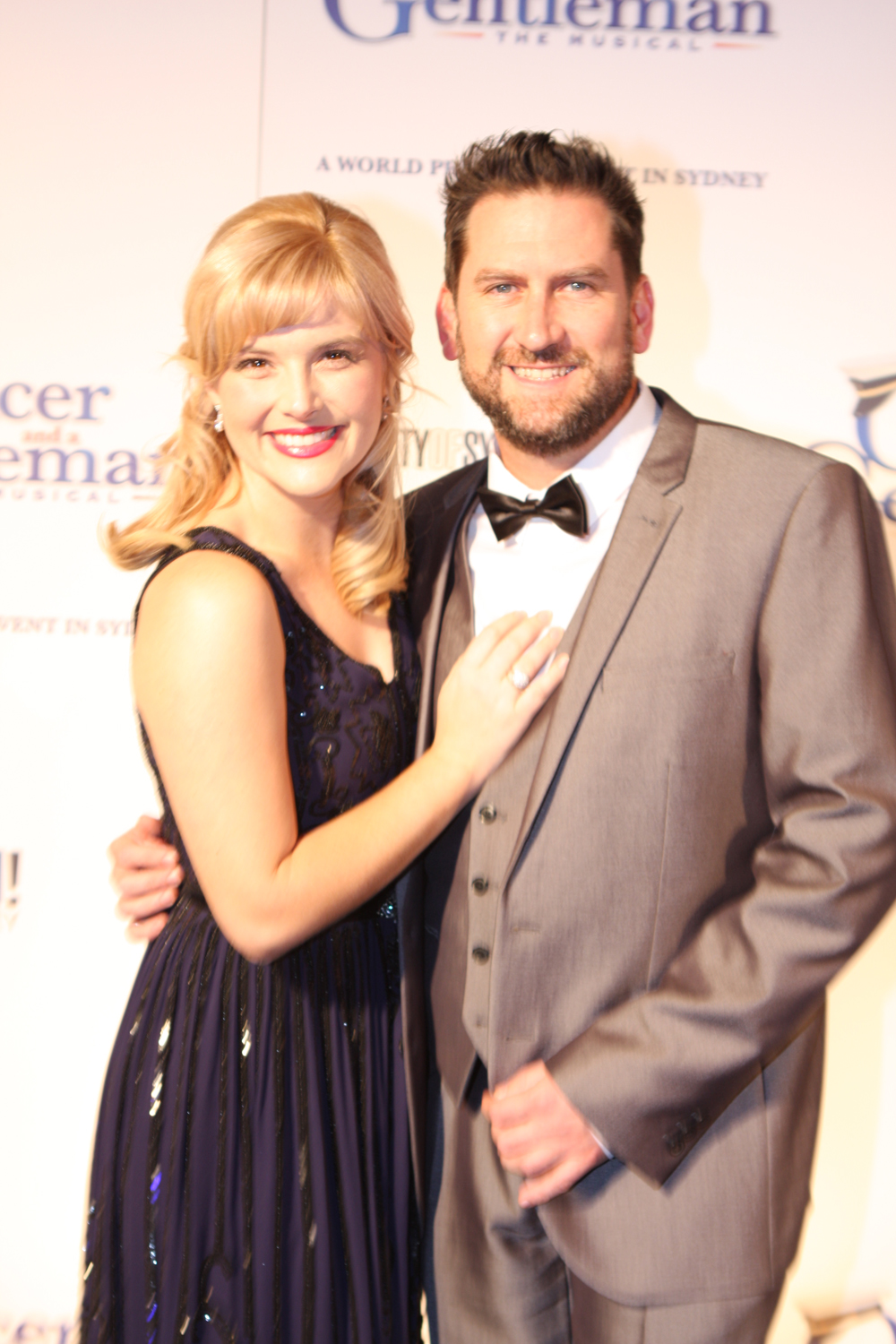
Durack with husband Christopher Horsey

Durack married Christopher Horsey on Rottnest Island off the coast of Perth, Western Australia on 5 April 2014. They have a daughter and a son.
