= Matthew Lee Robinson =

Australian actor

- Spouse: Scott Morris
- Awards: Pratt Prize for Music Theatre, Helpmann Award (nominated)
- Website: matthewleerobinson.com

Matthew Lee Robinson is an Australian composer/lyricist and actor, most known for his musical theatre and television work.

== Career ==
Robinson was born in Rockhampton, Queensland, and graduated from the Western Australian Academy of Performing Arts with a Bachelor of Arts (Musical Theatre). Direct from graduating he was cast in the original Australian cast of Mamma Mia!, during which time he began writing the songs which would form the basis of his first musical Metro Street. Robinson was cast as Teague in the World Premiere of Australian play God's Last Acre for Playbox Theatre Company (now Malthouse Theatre, Melbourne) and appeared in guest roles on television's Blue Heelers and Stingers as well as the telemovie Like Mother, Like Son: The Strange Story of Sante and Kenny Kimes, appearing opposite Mary Tyler Moore.

Robinson's songwriting garnered national attention when Metro Street won the 2004 Pratt Prize for Music Theatre, an $80,000 award for the best new musical submitted from within Australia. Robinson and longtime collaborator Lucy Durack created and toured Immaculate Confection, a showcase of Robinson's songs, through five states in Australia to critical acclaim before Robinson was cast as the title role in Pippin for Peter Cousens' Kookaburra. On the back of this, director Stuart Maunder cast him in three successive musicals for Opera Australia at the Sydney Opera House: Freddy Eynsford-Hill in My Fair Lady, Henrik in A Little Night Music and Frederic in The Pirates of Penzance. During this time, Robinson also appeared as a bit part in the Steven Spielberg/Tom Hanks/HBO miniseries The Pacific and as a weekly on-screen vocal coach on the FOX8 reality TV series The Singing Office.

In 2009, Robinson's first musical Metro Street had its World Premiere at the State Theatre Company of South Australia, co-produced by Arts Asia Pacific and Power Arts. It was then picked up by the Daegu International Musical Festival in South Korea where it was the festival's featured opening musical. In total, Metro Street was nominated for five Helpmann Awards (including Best New Australian Work), the Victorian Premier's Literary Award for Best Music Theatre Script, three South Korean DIMF Awards and three Adelaide Curtain Call Awards. It won the Curtain Call Award for Best Musical.

2011 marked Robinson's television writing debut, contributing three songs to Series 2 of the Australian Broadcasting Corporation TV series Dance Academy. The same year Neil Gooding Productions produced Robinson's musical revue Sing On Through Tomorrow, with Robinson featuring on the original cast recording available on iTunes.

During Pippin, Robinson contacted composer/lyricist Stephen Schwartz, leading to a mentorship that continues today. Since 2010, Robinson has travelled to New York City once a year conducting readings of his current musicals in development Happy People and Atlantis which have been attended by Schwartz and representatives from a number of Broadway producing houses including Disney Theatrical Group, Manhattan Theatre Club, Araca, 321 Theatrical Management and Ambassador Theatre Group. These readings have been financially assisted by Power Arts, a Winston Churchill Memorial Trust Churchill Fellowship and an Australia Council for the Arts Skills & Arts Development Grant. In 2013, Village Theatre, Washington state, facilitated a workshop reading of Happy People.

With support from an Australia Council for the Arts Music Fellowship, Robinson is currently embarking on a two-year calendar of events, generating new musical theatre works across Australia, the U.S. and U.K.. He now resides in New York City.

== Personal life ==
Robinson was married to actor Scott Morris in May 2016.

== Awards ==
Year	Award	Category	Production	Result
2003	Sydney Cabaret Convention Awards	Judges Award with Lucy Durack		Won
2004	Pratt Prize for Music Theatre	Best New Musical	Metro Street	Won
2009	Adelaide Curtain Call Awards	Best Musical	Metro Street	Won
2009	Victorian Literary Premier's Award	Best Musical Theatre Script	Metro Street	Nominated
2009	Helpmann Awards	Best New Australian Work	Metro Street	Nominated
2009	DIMF Awards	Best Musical	Metro Street	Nominated
2009	DIMF Awards	Best Actor	Metro Street	Nominated
2011	Glug Awards	Glugs' Special Award	Sing On Through Tomorrow	Won
2011	APRA Awards	UTAS Stephen Schwartz Songwriting Award	"Dignity" from Metro Street	Won
2011	Churchill Fellowship	The Gilbert Spottiswood Fellowship	Happy People	Won
2013	Australia Council	Music Fellowship		Won
