= The Essential David Campbell =

Greatest hits album by David Campbell
- Released: 21 August 2015
- Recorded: 2006–2011
- Genre: Easy Listening / Pop
- Label: Sony Music Australia

David Campbell albums chronology
David Campbell Sings John Bucchino (2014)	The Essential David Campbell (2015)	Dream Lover: The Bobby Darin Musical (2016)

The Essential David Campbell is the first greatest hits album by the Australian singer, David Campbell (tenth overall). The album was released in August 2015 and has tracks from his five Sony Music Australia albums, The Swing Sessions, The Swing Sessions 2, Good Lovin', On Broadway and Let's Go.

== Review ==
Mallory Arbour of The AU Review gave the album 8.5 out of 10, questioning at whom this album was targeted, as Campbell's fan would already have the songs on CD before saying, "It's a mix of swing, classic hits and musical numbers – and I love every minute of it! It not only shows David's range, but also his clear talent," adding, "David Campbell's The Essential is named rightly so. This album won't disappoint."

== Track listing ==
CD1 - The Swing Sessions

1. "You're Nobody till Somebody Loves You"
2. "Mack the Knife"
3. "The Way You Look Tonight"
4. "Can't Take My Eyes Off You"
5. "All the Way"
6. "Beyond the Sea"
7. "Mr. Bojangles"
8. "She's My Baby"
9. "Witchcraft"
10. "Route 66"
11. "I've Got a Crush on You"
12. "Danke Schön"
13. "Just a Gigolo/I Ain't Got Nobody"
14. "That Old Black Magic"
15. "There Will Never Be Another You"
16. "That's Life"
17. "One for My Baby"
18. "King of the Road"

CD2 - The Favourites

1. "Good Lovin"
2. "Keep on Runnin"
3. "You've Lost That Lovin' Feeling" (feat. Jimmy Barnes)
4. "You Made Me So Very Happy"
5. "Jackie Wilson Said (I'm in Heaven When You Smile)"
6. "Suspicious Minds"
7. "Shout to the Top"
8. "Let's Go"
9. "True"
10. "Missing You"
11. "I Can Dream About You"
12. "Oh What a Beautiful Mornin' (Oklahoma!)"
13. "Hey There (The Pajama Game)"
14. "Hello, Dolly! (Hello, Dolly!)"
15. "All I Care About (Chicago)"
16. "You'll Never Walk Alone (Carousel)"
17. "Luck Be a Lady (Guys and Dolls)"
18. "Goodbye (Catch Me If You Can)"

== Release history ==
Country	Date	Format	Label	Catalogue
Australia	21 August 2015	CD, digital download	Sony Music Australia	88875131622
