= First and Foremost =

Compilation album by David Campbell
- Released: 16 August 2008
- Recorded: 1996/1997
- Genre: Pop, jazz
- Label: Universal Music Australia

David Campbell chronology
| The Swing Sessions 2 (2007) | First and Foremost (2008) | Good Lovin' (2008) |

First and Foremost is a compilation album of songs by Australian singer David Campbell. The album was released in August 2008 and contains tracks from his earlier Polydor Records recordings from 1996 and 1997, alongside a previously unreleased song from that time. Most of the tracks appeared on his albums, Yesterday Is Now and Taking the Wheel.

The album was released during Campbell's time as a singing mentor on It Takes Two (Australian TV series) (2007–2008) and with his two previous albums (released by Sony Music Australia), both being top 10, platinum selling albums.

== Track listing ==
CD/DD

1. "On Such a Night as This" (Marshall Barer, Hugh Martin)- 2:39
2. "Grateful" (John Bucchino) - 4:38
3. "Whatever Happened to Melody" (Ray Jessel, Cynthia Thompson)- 3:25
4. "Come Rain or Come Shine" (Harold Arlen, Johnny Mercer)- 5:01
5. "Old Devil Moon" (Burton Lane, Yip Harburg) - 3:12
6. "Alexander's Ragtime Band" (Irving Berlin) - 3"08
7. "Let Me Sing and I'm Happy" - 2:16
8. "I Got Rhythm" (George Gershwin & Ira Gershwin) - 2:38
9. "The Nearness of You" / "Not a Day Goes By" (Hoagy Carmichael, Ned Washington, Stephen Sondheim) - 5:06
10. "Storybook" (Frank Wildhorn, Nan Knighton) - 3:10
11. "Yard Sale" (Tom Andersen) - 5:43
12. "Errol Flynn" (Gordon Hunt, Amanda McBroom)- 3:38
13. "Mr Tanner" (Harry Chapin) - 5:06
14. "I Have Dreamed" (Oscar Hammerstein, Richard Rodgers) - 3:57
15. "Only Heaven Knows" (Alex Harding) - 3:13
16. "Taking the Wheel" (John Bucchino) - 3:54
17. "A Kid Inside" (Craig Carnelia) - 3:35
18. "It Will Always Be You" (Acoustic Version) 4:43

== Charts ==
| Chart (2008) | Peak position |
|---|---|
| Australian Jazz and Blues Albums (ARIA Charts) | 16 |

== Release history ==
| Country | Date | Format | Label | Catalogue |
|---|---|---|---|---|
| Australia | 16 August 2008 | CD,digital download | Universal Music Australia | 1781086 |
