= Joseph: King of Dreams (soundtrack) =

2000 film soundtrack album

Soundtrack album by Danny Pelfrey
- Released: November 7, 2000
- Genre: Orchestral
- Label: DreamWorks Records

Danny Pelfrey chronology
| Star Trek: Armada (2000) | Joseph: King of Dreams (2000) | Star Trek: Away Team (2001) |

Singles from Joseph: King of Dreams
- 1. "You Know Better Than I" Released: 2000

Joseph: King of Dreams (Original Motion Picture Soundtrack) is the soundtrack album composed by Danny Pelfrey, with songs written by John Bucchino, for the film of the same name and released by DreamWorks Records on November 7, 2000.

== Background and release ==
All songs were produced and arranged by Danny Pelfrey, and he also composed the score. Hans Zimmer, the composer for The Prince of Egypt, had approved of Pelfrey taking over his role after the latter, a relative unknown at the time, did a couple of interviews at DreamWorks. Pelfrey explained that through the process Zimmer gave him an input as to what they liked to hear, through the arranging and production of the songs. Pelfrey said that Zimmer gave him the foundation and communication skills he needed to successfully complete the project. After receiving the job, Pelfrey read as many different translations of the original Bible text as he could, to find story nuances that he could incorporate. In regard to his collaboration with DreamWorks, he said that the input was initially "pretty" sketchy, but was an ongoing process with lots of dialog with writers, producers and directors along the way, also saying Jeffery Katzenberg was directly involved with the entire process. He also explained that he had never done a musical before, but Zimmer helped him to incorporate the sounds from The Prince of Egypt, serving as his guide in the song production.

Pelfrey used choral choirs sparingly in his score, with notable examples being a small female group in the beginning for what he called God's theme, and in the scene at the end, which was the reunion of Joseph, his brothers and Jacob, his father. This was because the effect reminded him of angels, as he thought it was more appropriate to the sonic tapestry and he created a more uplifting feeling. He described his musical style in the film as "World/Orchestral", noting that the instruments used were more regional than specifically Egyptian, incorporating Duduk, Ney, Rebaba, Ban-Di, Bansuri, Moroccan Flute, Zampona, and a great variety of percussion including Djembe, Darbuka, Dholak, Udu etc. In regard to using instrumentation from an inaccurate historical context, he said that he always thought that the exact historical and geographical use of the instruments is not as important as the evocative or dramatic effect. A temp-track was made for the score, though DreamWorks "were not too attached to it"; some parts were tracked with "Fantasia on a Theme by Thomas Tallis" by Vaughan Williams. David Campbell doubled as Joseph's singing voice and the singing narrator as well.

Pelfrey commented: "Since I had never done a musical before, it was interesting to note the difference between producing these songs as opposed to doing a record. In a musical, the songs advance the story and I had to help that process, as well as make the songs belong to the fabric of the film and the palette of the score. Although this was animation, it certainly did not call for a cartoon approach, due to the depth of the story. The film needed more of a live-action treatment to the score. Joseph: King of Dreams also allowed me to work with the best producers in the business and helped make this a very successful experience both personally and professionally". He explained that Lucas Richman was the reason the Symphonic Suite from Joseph was created. Lucas contacted Pelfrey about wanting to present it in a concert he was doing in Knoxville where he was the conductor and music director, and Pelfrey created the suite especially for them. Pelfrey said that he created a vibrant and thriving orchestra there and they were all welcoming for him. It was performed in LA by the Los Angeles Jewish Symphony in August 2010.

Score and songs were released in 2000 in CD format only for promotional purposes without release to a mass audience.

== Track listing ==
All tracks are written by John Bucchino and Danny Pelfrey

| No. | Title | Performer(s) | Length |
|---|---|---|---|
| 1. | "God's Theme" |
| 2. | "Miracle Child" | Maureen McGovern, Russell Buchanan & David Campbell |
| 3. | "Wolf Dream" |
| 4. | "Home Theme" |
| 5. | "Wolf Chase" |
| 6. | "Was It A Dream?" |
| 7. | "Fractured Home" |
| 8. | "Bloom" | Maureen McGovern |
| 9. | "The Scheme" |
| 10. | "The Betrayal" |
| 11. | "In The Pit" |
| 12. | "Slave Traders" |
| 13. | "Desert Crossing" |
| 14. | "Marketplace" | Chorus |
| 15. | "Potiphar And The Cat Chase" |
| 16. | "Asenath" |
| 17. | "Joseph Uncovers Deception" |
| 18. | "Whatever Road's at Your Feet" | David Campbell |
| 19. | "Remembering Home" |
| 20. | "Zuleika's Seduction" |
| 21. | "Potiphar Imprisons Joseph" |
| 22. | "Rats" |
| 23. | "The Butler's Dream" |
| 24. | "The Baker's Dream" |
| 25. | "Prison Time" |
| 26. | "Lost Hope" |
| 27. | "You Know Better Than I" | David Campbell |
| 28. | "Potiphar's Apology" |
| 29. | "Pharaoh Meets Joseph" |
| 30. | "Pharaoh's First Dream" |
| 31. | "Pharaoh's Second Dream" |
| 32. | "Joseph Interprets Pharaoh's Dreams" |
| 33. | "Joseph's Ascension" |
| 34. | "Joseph and Asenath" |
| 35. | "More than You Take" | David Campbell & Jodi Benson |
| 36. | "Egypt's Famine" |
| 37. | "Brothers Come To Egypt" |
| 38. | "Revenge/Arrest Them" |
| 39. | "They're My Brothers" |
| 40. | "Bloom (Reprise)" | Jodi Benson |
| 41. | "Meet Benjamin" |
| 42. | "The Feast" |
| 43. | "Benjamin is Framed" |
| 44. | "Reunion" |

== Reception ==
DecentFilmsGuide commented that the songs "while cheerful and uplifting, are generally unmemorable", and said that "in one small way, Joseph: King of Dreams even outshines the earlier film: the spirituality of its signature song, "You Know Better Than I", is much more profound than anything in the more mainstream "There Can Be Miracles". DVD Verdict similarly praised its music. PluggedIn wrote the film songs as "uplifting".

However, The Movie Report was critical to the songs and music, with the exception of "You Know Better Than I". ChristianAnswers.net also praised the music and the song "You Know Better Than I". CommonSenseMedia noted that it lacks The Prince of Egypt's poignant tunes.

== Accolades ==
| Award | Category | Nominee(s) | Result | Ref. |
|---|---|---|---|---|
| Video Premier Awards | Best Song | "Better Than I" | Won | |
| Video Premier Awards | Best Original Score | Daniel Pelfrey | Nominated | |
