= Helpmann Award for Best Male Actor in a Musical =

Annual Australian musical theatre award

- Awarded for: Best Male Actor in a Musical
- Location: Australia
- Presented by: Live Performance Australia
- Currently held by: Callum Francis for Kinky Boots (2017)
- Website: HelpmannAwards.com.au

The Helpmann Award for Best Male Actor in a Musical is a musical award, presented by Live Performance Australia (LPA) at the annual Helpmann Awards since 2001. This is a list of winners and nominations for the Helpmann Award for Best Male Actor in a Musical.

== Winners and nominees ==
Winners are listed first and marked in a separate colour.

=== 2000s ===
Year	Actor	Production	Character(s)
2001 (1st)
2001 (1st)	Todd McKenney	The Boy from Oz	Peter Allen
2001 (1st)	Anthony Warlow	Annie	Oliver "Daddy" Warbucks
2001 (1st)	David Campbell	Shout! The Legend of the Wild One	Johnny O'Keefe
2001 (1st)	Rob Guest	Jolson	Al Jolson
2002 (2nd)
2002 (2nd)	Peter Coleman-Wright	Sweeney Todd: The Demon Barber of Fleet Street	Sweeney Todd
2002 (2nd)	Martin Crewes	Oh! What a Night	Rik
2002 (2nd)	Robert Grubb	Mamma Mia!	Harry Bright
2002 (2nd)	Wayne Scott Kermond	Singin' in the Rain	Cosmo Brown
2003 (3rd)
2003 (3rd)	Toby Allen	Cabaret	The Emcee
2003 (3rd)	Paul McDermott	The Witches of Eastwick	Darryl van Horne
2003 (3rd)	Anthony Warlow	Man of La Mancha	Don Quixote
2003 (3rd)	John Waters	Oliver!	Fagin
2004 (4th)
2004 (4th)	Matt Hetherington	The Full Monty	Jerry
2004 (4th)	Peter Carroll	The Republic of Myopia	President of Myopia and Maximilian Sault
2004 (4th)	Michael Falzon	We Will Rock You	Galileo
2004 (4th)	Tony Harvey	The Lion King	Scar
2005 (5th)
2005 (5th)	Mitchell Butel	The Venetian Twins	Zanetto
2005 (5th)	Kane Alexander	Urinetown	Bobby Strong
2005 (5th)	Shane Bourne	Urinetown	Officer Lockstock
2005 (5th)	Reg Livermore	The Producers	Max Bialystock
2006 (6th)
2006 (6th)	David Campbell	Sunset Boulevard	Joe
2006 (6th)	David Campbell	The 25th Annual Putnam County Spelling Bee	Chip Tolentino
2006 (6th)	Ian Stenlake	Oklahoma!	Curly McLain
2006 (6th)	Chaim Topol	Fiddler on the Roof	Tevye
2007 (7th)
2007 (7th)	iOTA	Hedwig and the Angry Inch	Hedwig
2007 (7th)	David Harris	Miss Saigon	Chris
2007 (7th)	Hugh Jackman	The Boy from Oz	Peter Allen
2007 (7th)	Tony Sheldon	Priscilla, Queen of the Desert	Bernadette
2008 (8th)
2008 (8th)	Lochlan Denholm, Nick Twiney, Rarmian Newton and Rhys Kosakowski	Billy Elliot the Musical	Billy Elliot
2008 (8th)	iOTA	The Rocky Horror Show	Dr. Frank-N-Furter
2008 (8th)	Mitchell Butel	Little Me	Various^{[A]}
2008 (8th)	Anthony Warlow	The Phantom of the Opera	The Phantom
2009 (9th)
2009 (9th)	Bille Brown	Monty Python's Spamalot	King Arthur
2009 (9th)	Reg Livermore	My Fair Lady	Professor Henry Higgins
2009 (9th)	Todd McKenney	Priscilla, Queen of the Desert	Tick
2009 (9th)	Eddie Perfect	Shane Warne: The Musical	Shane Warne

=== 2010s ===
Year	Actor	Production	Character(s)
2010 (10th)
2010 (10th)	Mitchell Butel	Avenue Q	Princeton
2010 (10th)	Michael Cormick	Mamma Mia!	Sam Carmichael
2010 (10th)	Bobby Fox	Jersey Boys	Frankie Valli
2010 (10th)	Geoffrey Rush	The Drowsy Chaperone	Man in Chair
2011 (11th)
2011 (11th)	Matt Lee	Mary Poppins	Bert
2011 (11th)	David Harris	Wicked	Fiyero
2011 (11th)	Ben Lewis	Love Never Dies	The Phantom
2011 (11th)	Anthony Warlow	Doctor Zhivago	Yuri Zhivago
2012 (12th)
2012 (12th)	Mitchell Butel	The Mikado	Ko-Ko
2012 (12th)	Trevor Ashley	Fat Swan	Natalie Portly
2012 (12th)	Justin Burford	Rock of Ages	Drew Boley
2012 (12th)	Anthony Warlow	Annie	Oliver "Daddy" Warbucks
2013 (13th)
2013 (13th)	Geoffrey Rush	A Funny Thing Happened on the Way to the Forum	Pseudolus
2013 (13th)	David Harris	Legally Blonde	Emmett Forrest
2013 (13th)	Wayne Scott Kermond	The Producers	Max Bialystock
2013 (13th)	John Waters	The Addams Family	Gomez Addams
2014 (14th)
2014 (14th)	Craig McLachlan	Richard O'Brien's The Rocky Horror Show	Dr. Frank-N-Furter
2014 (14th)	Matt Hetherington	Dirty Rotten Scoundrels	Freddy Benson
2014 (14th)	Martin Crewes	Sweet Charity	Charlie, Vittorio and Oscar
2014 (14th)	Josh Quong Tart	The Lion King	Scar
2015 (15th)
2015 (15th)	Simon Gleeson	Les Misérables	Jean Valjean
2015 (15th)	Todd McKenney	La Cage aux Folles	Albin
2015 (15th)	Todd McKenney	Anything Goes	Lord Evelyn Oakleigh
2015 (15th)	Hayden Tee	Les Misérables	Javert
2016 (16th)
2016 (16th)	James Millar	Matilda the Musical	Miss Trunchbull
2016 (16th)	Rob Mills	Ghost the Musical	Sam Wheat
2016 (16th)	Anthony Warlow	Fiddler on the Roof	Tevye
2016 (16th)	Brent Hill	Little Shop of Horrors	Seymour
2017 (17th)
2017 (17th)	Callum Francis	Kinky Boots	Lola
2017 (17th)	Charles Edwards	My Fair Lady	Henry Higgins
2017 (17th)	AJ Holmes	The Book of Mormon	Elder Cunningham
2017 (17th)	Ainsley Melham	Aladdin	Aladdin
2018 (18th)
2018 (18th)	David Campbell	Dream Lover: The Bobby Darin Musical	Bobby Darin
2018 (18th)	Ian Stenlake	Mamma Mia!	Sam Carmichael
2018 (18th)	David Campbell	Assassins	John Wilkes Booth
2018 (18th)	David Harris	Priscilla, Queen of the Desert	Tick
2018 (18th)	Euan Doidge	Priscilla, Queen of the Desert	Felicia
2019 (19th)
2019 (19th)	Brent Hill	School of Rock the Musical	Dewey
2019 (19th)	Paul Slade Smith	Roald Dahl's Charlie and the Chocolate Factory	Willy Wonka
2019 (19th)	Alexander Lewis	Handa Opera on Sydney Harbour: West Side Story	Tony
2019 (19th)	Blake Bowden	The Book of Mormon	Elder Price

== See also ==
- Helpmann Awards

== Notes ==
A : In Little Me, Mitchell Butel plays all the men in the life of character Belle Poitrine, including: Noble Eggleston, Mr. Pinchley, Benny and Bernie Buchsbaum, Val du Val, Fred Poitrine, Otto Schnitzler, Mr. Worst and Prince Cherney.
