= Gordon Hunt =

Gordon Hunt may refer to:

- Gordon Hunt (musician), British oboist
- Gordon Hunt (director) (1929–2016), American actor and director
