= Yesterday Is Now =

Studio album by David Campbell
- Released: February 1997
- Recorded: 1996
- Genre: Pop, jazz, country
- Length: 54:13
- Label: Polydor Records
- Producer: Glen Phimister

David Campbell chronology
Yesterday Is Now (1997)	Taking the Wheel (1997)

Yesterday Is Now is the debut studio album by Australian singer David Campbell. The album was released in February 1997 by Polydor Records. The album includes the studio recording of "Heaven Knows" from Only Heaven Knows for which he was nominated for Best Musical Theatre Performer at the 1995 Mo Awards.

== Review ==
Amazon editor David Horiuchi said: "Rising cabaret star David Campbell made his U.S. recording debut with Yesterday Is Now, mixing familiar standards ("Come Rain or Come Shine") with wistful nostalgia ("On Such a Night as This," "Whatever Happened to Melody?") and gems from contemporary songwriters. Campbell's warm voice is a delight to listen to, and his understanding of lyrics belies his years. He also explores his roots with his "Australian Musical Medley".

== Track listing ==
1. "Whatever Happened to Melody!" (Ray Jessel / Cynthia Thompson) - 3:23
2. "Help Is on the Way" - 3:05
3. "Errol Flynn" (Gordon Hunt / Amanda McBroom) - 3:57
4. "I Have Dreamed"/"Out of My Dreams" (Oscar Hammerstein / Richard Rodgers) - 3:56
5. "Only Heaven Knows" (Alex Harding) - 3:13
6. "Rock-A-Bye Your Baby With a Dixie Melody" (Sam M. Lewis / Jean Schwartz / Joe Young) - 3:32
7. "Come Rain or Come Shine" (Harold Arlen / Johnny Mercer) - 5:01
8. "Broadway Baby" (Stephen Sondheim) - 3:26
9. "Alexander's Ragtime Band" (Irving Berlin) - 3:07
10. "Australian Musical Medley" (Albert Arlen / Nancy Brown / Lloyd Thomson) - 5:26
11. "A Kid Inside" (Craig Carnelia) - 3:34
12. "Mr. Tanner" (Harry Chapin) - 5:06
13. "On Such a Night as This" (Marshall Barer / Hugh Martin) - 2:39
14. "Til Tomorrow"/"The Promise (I'll Never Say Goodbye)" (Alan Bergman / Marilyn Bergman / Jerry Bock / Sheldon Harnick / David Shire) - 4:23

== Release history ==
Country	Date	Format	Label	Catalogue
Australia	February 1997	CD, Cassette	Philips, Polydor Records	532 714-2
