= Kane Alexander =

Australian actor and singer

Kane Alexander is an Australian singer, and television actor. He has appeared in Blue Heelers, Neighbours, Stingers.

== Early life ==
Kane Alexander grew up in Victoria, Australia, where he was raised on an isolated farm in Victoria's wheat-belt.

== Professional career ==
Alexander had lead roles he has performed on the Australian stage, including Bobby Strong in Melbourne Theatre Company's Urinetown, Claude in Hair, Willard in Footloose, Billy Crocker in Anything Goes, and the Scarecrow in the Sydney season of The Wizard of Oz. He has also appeared in the 10th-anniversary production of Les Misérables, South Pacific, Only Heaven Knows and Angry Penguins.

In 2000, Kane took his cabaret show to New York, at the FireBird Cafe and the Algonquin Hotel's Oak Room. In the 2001 New York Cabaret Awards, he was named "Best New Voice" in the TheaterMania cabaret list. He won both the Bistro and MAC Awards for "Most Outstanding Debut", and was "Critic's Pick" in the New York Post, plus "Pick of the Week" in New York's Time Out magazine for three consecutive weeks. In 2002, he was requested to perform alongside Natalie Cole at Rupert Murdoch's 70th birthday party, hosted in New York.

After his return to Australia, he was a finalist in the arts section of the 2001 Young Australian of the Year Awards, and nominated for a MO Award for his performance in Footloose. Kane also completed a tour with the Australian Philharmonic Orchestra, performing the music of Lerner and Loewe at concert halls around Australia.

Alexander made several television appearances, such as Good Morning Australia, Denise, The Midday Show, In Melbourne Tonight, Carols by Candlelight and The Good Friday Appeal Gala, along with roles in Late for School, Neighbours, Water Rats and Stingers. He also appeared as a guest performer on the 18 June 2006 special broadcast of The Footy Show which was filmed in Munich in which he performed the song "Timeless" with Australian singer Tina Arena. The show was specially broadcast in support of the Australian soccer team for the 2006 FIFA World Cup.

== Kane Alexander (debut album) ==
Kane Alexander

Studio album by Kane Alexander
- Released: 29 April 2006
- Recorded: Stockholm, London
- Genre: Jazz
- Label: Sony BMG
- Producer: Tom Nichols

=== Track listing ===
1. "Escape"
2. "Come vivrei (How Do I Live)"
3. "Timeless" (duet with Tina Arena)
4. "Di sole e d'azzurro"
5. "Nella Fantasia"
6. "Everything That I Am"
7. "Le cose che sei per me" ("The Things You Are To Me")
8. "Crying"
9. "Kiss from a Rose"
10. "Let It Rain"
11. "Breathe"
