= You Know Better Than I =

Song by David Campbell

from the album Joseph: King of Dreams
- Released: 2000
- Songwriter: John Bucchino
- Composer: John Bucchino

"You Know Better Than I" (aka "Better Than I") is the signature song from the 2000 direct-to-video film Joseph: King of Dreams. It is performed by David Campbell, who provided the singing voice for Joseph and doubling as the singing narrator of the film, and was written by John Bucchino. It served as a crucial non-diegetic song conveying the message of hope during struggle.

The song served as a key musical narration interjected with montages showing Joseph at his lowest point, almost giving up on his faith. He decides to trust fully in God and acknowledge that he is the master of the universe who has an ultimate plan, even if things seem bad at present and he doesn't fully understand why.

== Cover versions ==
In 2008, the song was covered by Filipino singer Gary Valenciano for his album Rebirth. It features a lot more orchestration. Due to the slow tempo, its length was 4 minutes and 21 seconds.

== Meaning ==
PluggedIn explained the song's meaning: "Persevering through dark times can yield great rewards. God's role in Joseph's comeback is clear, reinforced by "You Know Better Than I", a song addressing His loving omniscience".

== Critical reception ==
DecentFilms wrote: "In one small way, Joseph: King of Dreams even outshines the earlier film The Prince of Egypt: the spirituality of its signature song, 'You Know Better Than I', is much more profound than anything in the more mainstream 'There Can Be Miracles'...There's a message my kids can listen to as many times as they want". DVD Verdict Review said: "The best of [the film's songs] is entitled Better Than I and deals with Joseph's acceptance that his destiny and the answers to life's questions must come from a higher source than his own understanding". DailyReview wrote that "Better Than I evokes the best of '90s power ballads". Variety said "the best of the songs by John Bucchino, 'Better Than I' and 'What Road Lies at Your Feet', are unabashedly soaring anthems that accept and celebrate the divine. Both tunes have potential to become standards for both mainstream entertainers and Christian music performing artists". Stephen Schwartz wrote: "[John Bucchino] can write a soaring ballad with the best of them, as in 'Grateful' or 'Better than I' or 'If I Ever Say I'm Over you', and yet never feel sentimental or generic".
