= Shout! The Legend of The Wild One =

2000 musical by John-Michael Howson, David Mitchell, and Melvyn Morrow

Shout! The Legend of the Wild One
- Book: John-Michael Howson; David Mitchell; Melvyn Morrow
- Productions: 2001 Australia; 2008 Australia

Shout! The Legend of the Wild One is an Australian musical based on the life of Johnny O'Keefe. As a jukebox musical, it features songs recorded by O'Keefe and other popular songs from the 1950s and 1960s. It was first staged in Melbourne at the State Theatre in December 2000.

== Plot ==
In the mid-1970s, Johnny O'Keefe takes his new fiancé to see the Sydney Stadium before its demolition. He reminisces about his life, growing up in Sydney and falling for Marianne, a German immigrant. When he hears "Rock Around the Clock" by Bill Haley and the Comets, he discovers a passion for rock music and persuades Lee Gordon to promote him.

O'Keefe achieves fame and success, but his journey is married by a car crash and difficulty breaking into the US market. His relationship with Gordon deteriorates, his marriage falls apart and Gordon dies. Despite these challenges, O'Keefe makes a comeback in the 1970s.

The musical features a cast of 15 male and 3 female characters, plus a chorus of 8 young men and 8 young women.

== Production history ==
Shout! premiered in Melbourne at the State Theatre in December 2000, followed by seasons in Sydney, Adelaide and Brisbane throughout 2001.

The original production of Shout! was produced by Kevin Jacobsen, directed by Richard Wherrett and featured David Campbell as O'Keefe. Both were nominated at the 2001 Helpmann Awards, for Best Direction of a Musical and Best Male Actor in a Musical respectively. Ross Coleman was the choreographer. The original production was later remounted for a national tour in January 2008, starring Tim Campbell as O'Keefe.

Shout! was produced by the Beenleigh Theatre Group at Crete Street Theatre in Beenleigh, Queensland in November 2016.

Rights to the show are managed by Origin Theatrical.

== Cast information ==
Original casts
Character	Australia 2001	Australia 2008
Johnny O'Keefe	David Campbell	Tim Campbell
Marianne Renate	Tamsin Carroll	Alexis Fishman
Lee Gordon	Aaron Blabey	Mark Holden
Thelma O'Keefe	Trisha Noble	Colleen Hewett
Ray O'Keefe	Doug Scroope	Glenn Shorrock
The DeeJays	Peter Skelton, Brett Canning, Andrew Ho, Ben Daley, Brennan Muhoberac	
The Deltones	Paul Biencourt (Noel Weiderberg), Kurt Sneddon (“Pee Wee” Wilson), Michael Griffiths, Todd Goddard	

== Cast recording ==
Shout! The Legend of The Wild One

Soundtrack album by Australian Cast featuring David Campbell
- Released: March 2001
- Genres: Rock and roll music Stage and Screen
- Label: Epic Records
- Producers: Amber Jacobsen, Col Joye, Kevin Jacobsen, Chris Dickie, David Campbell, Ken Laing

David Campbell albums chronology
Taking the Wheel (1997)	Shout! The Legend of The Wild One (2001)	The Swing Sessions (2006)

Shout! The Legend of The Wild One original cast recording was released in March 2001. The album was certified gold in Australia. It received the ARIA Award for Best Original Cast/Show Album in 2001.

=== Track listing ===
1. "Sing (And Tell The Blues So Long)" - 2:05
2. "Wild One (Real Wild Child)"- 2:05
3. "Cry" - 2:15
4. "Save the Last Dance For Me" (with Tamsin Carroll)- 3:59
5. "Rock and Roll will Stand" (with Kevin Murphy) -2:04
6. "Right Now" - 1:36
7. "Move Baby Move" - 2:15
8. "Crazy" (by Tamsin Carroll) - 2:31
9. "(The) Sun's Gonna Shine Tomorrow" - 2:27
10. "He Wears My Ring" (by Trisha Noble) - 1:47
11. "She's My Baby" - 2:08
12. "Ready For You" (with Tamsin Carroll) - 1:51
13. "Get a Job" (by Paul Biencourt) - 1:40
14. "Hit Record" - 2:34
15. "Chapel of Love" (by Tamsin Carroll) - 2:26
16. "I'm Gonna Knock on Your Door" - 2:09
17. "Holdin' You In My Holden" (by Sara Highlands, Carly O'Rourke, Eve Prideaux) - 1:10
18. "Mockingbird" (with Trisha Noble and Katie McCarthy) - 2:37
19. "I'm Counting On You" (with Tamsin Carroll)- 2:58
20. "So Tough" - 1:49
21. "Tourin' Time" (by Australian cast) - 2:34
22. "Purple People Eater"/"Witch Doctor" (with Aaron Blabey) -2:37
23. "Mr. Bass Man" (with Kurt Sneddon) 1:49
24. "Bye Bye Baby" (by Anton Koritni) - 2:34
25. "She Wears My Ring" - 2:37
26. "Rock Around the Clock" - 2:11
27. "What'd I Say" - 2:55
28. "Shout!" - 5:44

=== Charts and certifications ===
==== Weekly charts ====
Chart (2001)	Peak position
Australian Albums (ARIA)	19

=== Year-end charts ===
Chart (2001)	Position
Australian Artist Albums Chart	96

=== Certifications ===
Region	Certification	Certified units/sales
Australia (ARIA)	Gold	35,000^{^}
^{^} Shipments figures based on certification alone.
