= Dream Lover: The Bobby Darin Musical =

Soundtrack album by Australian Cast featuring David Campbell
- Released: 23 September 2016
- Recorded: 2016
- Genres: Rock and roll, stage and screen
- Label: Epic Records

David Campbell albums chronology
| The Essential David Campbell (2015) | Dream Lover: The Bobby Darin Musical (2016) | Baby It's Christmas (2018) |

Dream Lover: The Bobby Darin Musical is a jukebox musical based on an original concept and stage play by Frank Howson and John-Michael Howson, adapted for the stage by Frank Howson with Simon Phillips and Carolyn Burns. The musical tells the story of singer, songwriter and actor Bobby Darin.

The original production played at the Sydney Lyric Theatre from September to November 2016. It featured David Campbell as Bobby Darin, Caroline O'Connor as Polly / Mary Douvan, Hannah Fredericksen as Sandra Dee, Bert LaBonte as Charlie, Martin Crewes as Steve Blauner, Marney McQueen as Nina, and Phoebe Panaretos as Connie Francis. A Melbourne season, with Marina Prior replacing O'Connor, ran from December 2017 to March 2018 at the State Theatre.

Dream Lover was nominated for six 2018 Helpmann Awards including Best Musical. Campbell received the Helpmann Award for Best Male Actor in a Musical.

== Cast recording ==
The Australian cast recording featuring David Campbell was released in September 2016 and peaked at number 9 on the ARIA Chart. It was nominated for an ARIA Award for Best Original Soundtrack or Musical Theatre Cast Recording in 2017.

=== Track listing ===
1. "Dream Lover" – 2:20
2. "Mack the Knife" – 3:19
3. "Splish Splash" – 2:34
4. "That's the Way Love Is" – 2:52
5. "I'm Gonna Live Till I Die" – 1:47
6. "Everybody's Somebody's Fool" – 1:70
7. "I've Got the World on a String" – 2:14
8. "Call Me Irresponsible" – 2:37
9. "Dream Lover" (duet version) – 3:08
10. "Multiplication" – 1:43
11. "The Best Is Yet to Come" – 2:22
12. "Things" – 2:05
13. "More" – 3:17
14. "Beyond the Sea" – 3:00
15. "If I Were a Carpenter" – 2:43
16. "The Curtain Falls" – 4:19

=== Charts ===
| Chart (2016) | Peak position |
|---|---|
| Australian Albums (ARIA) | 9 |

=== Release history ===
| Country | Date | Format | Label | Catalogue |
|---|---|---|---|---|
| Australia | 23 September 2016 | CD, digital download | Sony Music Australia | 88985369342 |
