= Back in the Swing =

Studio album by David Campbell
- Released: 26 April 2019
- Label: Sony Music Australia
- Producer: Chong Lim

David Campbell chronology
Baby It's Christmas (2018)	Back in the Swing (2019)

Back in the Swing is the tenth studio album by Australian theatre performer, singer and TV presenter David Campbell, released through Sony Music Australia on 26 April 2019.

== Background ==
At a concert in Adelaide, Campbell played the little-known Joe Cang track "Make Love" and watched as the crowd responded. This was repeated for the next few nights. Campbell said "And every time I did it the dancefloor filled by the first or second chorus, even though they didn't know the song. It's a feelgood song, and it's modern and it's new and it doesn't feel like it's come out of an LA factory". Campbell began collaborating with arranger and producer Chong Lim and his on-stage musical director Joe Accra, to develop Back in the Swing, determined to mix traditions with new ideas.

== Track listing ==
1. "Come Fly with Me" – 3:08
2. "The Old Fashioned Way" – 3:38
3. "Make Love" – 3:10
4. "You Make Me Feel So Young" – 2:55
5. "In the Wee Small Hours of the Morning" (with Ian Moss) – 3:05
6. "I Can't Help Myself (Sugar Pie Honey Bunch)" – 2:30
7. "For Once in My Life" – 3:33
8. "Buona Sera" – 2:58
9. "Walkin' My Baby Back Home" – 2:41
10. "Chances Are" – 3:07
11. "New York Prelude / New York State of Mind" – 5:48

== Charts ==
=== Weekly charts ===
Chart (2019)	Peak position
Australian Albums (ARIA)	10

=== Year-end charts ===
Chart (2019)	Position
Australian Jazz and Blues Albums (ARIA)	2
Chart (2020)	Position
Australian Jazz and Blues Albums (ARIA)	26
Chart (2021)	Position
Australian Jazz and Blues Albums (ARIA)	24

== Release history ==
Country	Date	Format	Label	Catalogue
Australia	26 April 2019	CD, digital download, streaming	Sony Music Australia	19075952332
