= David Campbell Sings John Bucchino =

Studio album by David Campbell
- Released: 13 June 2014
- Genre: Classical music, Jazz music, Stage and Screen
- Length: 45:51
- Label: Social Family Records
- Producer: David Campbell, John Bucchino

David Campbell chronology
Let's Go (2011)	David Campbell Sings John Bucchino (2014)	The Essential David Campbell (2015)

David Campbell Sings John Bucchino' is the eighth studio album by Australian singer David Campbell, released in June 2014. The album was received critical acclaim and reached #1 on the Australian Jazz Charts.

David and John toured Australian throughout June 2014.

== Background ==
David Campbell was living in New York City in the 1990s and it's there he discovered the work of John Bucchino. The two become friends and have worked together since. This is their first collaborative album.

== Reviews ==
Ben Neutze of The Daily Review gave the album 3.5 out of 5 saying; "Campbell has reunited with long-time collaborator John Bucchino for an album covering music from the New York composer’s career; from his work on Broadway, off-Broadway and even his music for the DreamWorks animated film Joseph: King of Dreams. It’s an intimate affair, with Campbell’s vocals and Bucchino’s piano accompaniment the only instruments on the album, bringing to life the “new standards” Bucchino has written for cabaret artists over the last few decades. His songs are undeniably theatrical, but all work as standalones, existing in their own, individual worlds." adding "The blues-infused What You Need is a thrilling masterclass in vocal storytelling; raw and intimate, and perfectly in-step with Bucchino’s accompaniment. Puddle of Love sees the pair tackle jazz with a stunning solo from Bucchino, and Better Than I evokes the best of ‘90s power ballads."

Jacqui James of Gigs n Interviews said; "The album is David using his versatile voice conveying complete happiness ("Taking The Wheel") to utter heartbreak ("If I Ever Say I’m Over You") with John’s mesmerising piano capturing the mood brilliantly with each track. Unlike most albums released these days, David Campbell Sings John Bucchino has a very natural and organic sound throughout the eleven tracks. So it’s refreshing to basically listen David and John sitting in your living room or bedroom performing for you, giving an intimate experience."

== Track listing ==
CD/DD

1. "Sweet Dreams" - 4:01
2. "Something Spontaneous" - 3:40
3. "Unexpressed" - 3:13
4. "Puddle Of Love" - 3:16
5. "Better Than I" - 3:12
6. "Learn How to Say Goodbye" - 3:50
7. "It Feels Like Home" - 3:23
8. "What You Need" - 3:30
9. "If I Ever Say I'm Over You" - 3:44
10. "Taking the Wheel" - 4:05
11. "Grateful" - 4:32
- all tracks written by John Bucchino.

== Charts ==
=== Weekly charts ===
Chart (2014)	Peak position
Australian Albums (ARIA)	37

=== Year-end charts ===
Chart (2014)	Position
Australian Jazz and Blues Albums Chart	16

== Release history ==
Country	Date	Format	Label	Catalogue
Australia	13 June 2014	CD, digital download	Luckiest Records, Social Family Records	SFR0017
