= Baby It's Christmas (album) =

Studio album by David Campbell
- Released: 26 October 2018
- Genre: Christmas
- Length: 38:00
- Label: Sony Music Australia

David Campbell chronology
| Dream Lover: The Bobby Darin Musical (2016) | Baby It's Christmas (2018) | Back in the Swing (2019) |

Baby It's Christmas is the ninth studio and first Christmas album by Australian theatre performer, singer and TV presenter David Campbell, released through Sony Music Australia on 26 October 2018. The album includes 11 Christmas standards and one new track; (the title track), written by singer Rick Price.

== Track listing ==
1. "Holly Jolly Christmas" – 2:36
2. "Baby It's Christmas" – 3:05
3. "I've Got My Love to Keep Me Warm" – 2:47
4. "Jingle Bells" – 3:22
5. "When My Heart Finds Christmas" – 3:34
6. "It's the Most Wonderful Time of the Year" – 2:31
7. "The Christmas Song" – 3:38
8. "Rockin' Around the Christmas Tree" – 2:13
9. "Silent Night" – 4:18
10. "Little Saint Nick" – 2:36
11. "White Christmas" – 4:43
12. "O Come, All Ye Faithful" – 3:21

== Charts ==
| Chart (2018) | Peak position |
|---|---|
| Australian Albums (ARIA) | 12 |

== Release history ==
| Country | Date | Format | Label | Catalogue |
|---|---|---|---|---|
| Australia | 26 October 2018 | CD, digital download, streaming | Sony Music Australia | 19075893562 |
