= Hope (David Campbell song) =

Single by David Campbell
- Released: May 2003
- Label: CBS
- Songwriter(s): Steve Mac, Rob Davis
- Producer(s): Steve Mac

David Campbell singles chronology
| "Hope" (2003) | "When She's Gone" (2003) |

"Hope" is a song by Australian singer David Campbell. It was released as his debut single and peaked at 8 on the ARIA Charts.

== Track listing ==
CD single (Columbia – 673978.2)

1. "Hope"
2. "Waiting"
3. "Hope" (acoustic)

== Charts ==
| Chart (2003) | Peak position |
|---|---|
| Australia (ARIA) | 8 |
