= Jean Anderson (musician) =

New Zealand-born pianist (1923–2020)

Jean Anderson BEM FRAM
- Also known as: Margaret Jean Hunt
- Born: Margaret Jean Anderson; 26 February 1923; Christchurch, New Zealand
- Died: 12 August 2020 (aged 97) London, England
- Genres: Classical music
- Occupations: Pianist; professor
- Instrument: Piano
- Spouse: Francis Iveson Robeson Hunt (m. 1947; died 1992)

Margaret Jean Hunt (née Anderson; 26 February 1923 – 12 August 2020) was a New Zealand-born pianist and professor of music who lived and worked in the United Kingdom from the 1940s onwards.

== Early life and family ==
Born in Christchurch, New Zealand, on 26 February 1923, Anderson was the daughter of Florence Ruth Anderson (née Vincent) and Oscar Wilfred Breakey Anderson. Her father was a chartered accountant and sharebroker, later served on the Christchurch City Council, and was a noted floriculturalist. Anderson was educated at St Margaret's College, Christchurch.

In London, Anderson met Francis Iveson Robeson Hunt, whom she had known while a schoolgirl in Christchurch. Hunt was a businessman and violin teacher. The couple's engagement was announced in June 1946, and they wed on 22 February 1947 at St Cuthbert's Church, Earls Court. Their children include the musician Gordon Hunt.

== Musical education ==
Anderson attended the Royal Academy of Music. In 1947, she was awarded the Prize for Pianoforte Accompaniment by Princess Alice, Duchess of Gloucester. In 1948, she was awarded the Elsie Horne Gift and Albanesi Prize. In 1949, she was awarded the Chappell Pianoforte Prize and Rae Leeming Memorial Prize.

== Career ==
Anderson was, for a long time, professor of piano at the Royal Academy of Music. She adjudicated the Louise Band Prizes in 1978, 1979, 1980 and 1985, the Albanesi Prize in 1981, 1982, 1983, and 1986, and the Eric Brough Prize in 1982, 1983, and 1986. In 1985 and 1987, she adjudicated the Claude Beddington Prize, the Vivian Langrish Prize, the Frederick Westlake Prize, and the Cuthbert Whitemore Prize. She adjudicated the Leslie England Prize and Lloyd Hartey Prize in 1984, the Edna Bralesford Prizes in 1986, and the Evelyn German Prize in 1987.

Anderson was awarded the British Empire Medal in the 2017 New Year Honours, for services to music.

=== Former students ===
Anderson's former students include Neil Cowley, Sir John Tavener and Lucy Parham.

In Notes from a Small Soprano, Anderson's former pupil Lesley Garrett describes the influence of her professorship.

"She was the most spirited and lively professor on the entire staff and she understood me better than anyone. Tiny, raven-haired and feisty, she attacked life with the same passionate, electrifying energy that she used when she played the piano and she played wonderfully. She became my unofficial tutor and confidante and is still, to this day, a great friend."

Sarah Balfour, another of Anderson's pupils, describes her lasting impact.

"Jean not only taught me how to play and perform, but I also learnt from her, vital life lessons. All of her teachings will stay with me forever. She towers with strength and wisdom, and is truly inspirational. She handles the turbulence and challenges of life with dignity, poise and composure. She has given me the confidence to succeed and I am indebted to her."

== Death ==
Anderson died in London on 12 August 2020, at the age of 97. She had been predeceased by her husband, Frank Hunt, in 1992.
