= Taking the Wheel =

Studio album by David Campbell
- Released: September 1997
- Recorded: Electric Avenue Studios Sydney, Australia; June/July 1997
- Genre: Pop music Jazz music, Stage and Screen
- Length: 51:37
- Label: Polydor Records
- Producer: John Derry, Les Solomon, Mike Duffy

David Campbell chronology
Yesterday Is Now (1997)	Taking the Wheel (1997)	Shout! The Legend of The Wild One (2001)

Taking the Wheel is the second studio album by Australian singer David Campbell. The album was released in September 1997. There are three generations of songwriters represented on the recording - from musical theater masters like George Gershwin, Burton Lane to pop icons of more recent years like Paul Simon and Peter Allen and a new generation of writers.

Campbell's dad Jimmy Barnes suggested the song "It Will Always Be You", written by (Don Walker. In an interview with The New York Times, Campbell said; "This recording has been a great experience for me because I've had to trust myself and trust what I was hearing in my head - without being ignorant of the people around me and their advice, The buck stopped with me everywhere" adding "Every song has to mean something to me or there's no use singing it".

== Review ==
The New York Times said "the emotional center of the recording is 'Yard Sale', a quiet story song, written by Tom Anderson, about a young man getting rid of his possessions before facing life's final battle. Campbell follows it on the CD with 'Bridge Over Troubled Water' which emotionally supports the song that proceeds it. The spirituality and uplifting nature of the Paul Simon classic comes through in a way that is new and surprising, even for those who have listened to the song for years."

== Track listing ==
Taking the Wheel CD/Cassette (537936-2)

1. "Grateful" (John Bucchino) - 4:38
2. "Gentle Souls And Tender Hearted Fools" (John Bucchino) - 3:27
3. "It Will Always Be You" (Don Walker) - 3:58
4. "I Honestly Love You" (Jeff Barry, Peter Allen) - 3:17
5. "Old Devil Moon" (Burton Lane, Yip Harburg) - 3:12
6. "The Nearness Of You" / "Not A Day Goes By" (Hoagy Carmichael, Ned Washington, Stephen Sondheim) - 5:06
7. "I Got Rhythm" (George Gershwin & Ira Gershwin) - 2:38
8. "Never Really Mine To Lose" (Ann Hampton Callaway, Lindy Robbins) - 4:03
9. "Storybook" (Frank Wildhorn, Nan Knighton) - 3:10
10. "Yard Sale" (Tom Andersen) - 5:43
11. "Bridge Over Troubled Water" (Paul Simon) - 4:09
12. "Taking The Wheel" (John Bucchino) - 3:54
13. "Just Where They Should Be" (Craig Carnelia) - 4:45
14. "It Will Always Be You" (Acoustic Version) 4:43

== Credits ==
- Backing Vocals – David Campbell, Maggie McKinnie, Mark Punch, Mark Williams, Toni Mott
- Bass – Graham Thompson, Leon Gaer
- Cello – Adrian Wallis, Peter Morrison
- Drums – Andrew Gander, Doug Gallacher, Frank Celenza, Kere Buchanan
- Guitar – Mark Punch, Rex Goh
- Keyboards – Jamie Rigg, Mike Gubb
- Percussion – David Armstrong
- Piano – Christopher Denny, Don Walker
- Saxophone – Craig Walters, Martin Hill, Terry Benn, Trevor Griffin
- Trombone – Herb Cannon
- Trumpet – Paul Panici*, Paul Thorne
- Viola – Anne-Louise Comerford, Virginia Comerford
- Violin – Aram Zarasyan, Fiona Ziegler, Jennifer Johnson, John Pokorny, Martin Lass, Michael Wittgens, Phillip Hartl, Rebecca Daniel
