= Chong Lim =

Malaysian-Australian musician (born 1958)

Chong Lim AM
- Born: Chong Voon Lim; 11 February 1958 (age 68); Ipoh, Malaysia
- Occupations: Musician, producer, music director
- Instruments: Piano; digital audio workstation
- Years active: 1981–present

Chong Voon Lim AM (born 1958 in Ipoh, Malaysia) is a Malaysian-born Australian-based musical director, keyboardist, producer, and session musician. Lim attended St. Michael's Institution for secondary education. He relocated to Melbourne, Australia in 1977, where he attended Geelong College, and then completed a mechanical engineering course at the University of Melbourne from 1978 to 1981. Lim has toured with Jermaine Jackson and John Farnham, after Farnham's long-time collaborator David Hirschfelder left to concentrate on film scores. He has toured and been music director and producer for Olivia Newton-John since 1998 and is patron of the Olivia Newton-John Foundation.

Lim is a consultant for the musical instrument company Roland Corporation, producer of an album for Tommy Emmanuel and wrote music for the 2000 Summer Olympics in Sydney, was musical director and composer for the closing ceremony of the Melbourne 2006 Commonwealth Games. He was also musical director for the stage version of Dirty Dancing, Don't Forget Your Toothbrush and Kylie Minogue's Intimate and Live Tour.

In the 2018 Queen's Birthday Honours Lim was made a Member of the Order of Australia (AM) for "significant service to the performing arts as a musician, composer, producer and musical director, and to the community".

== Career ==
=== 2000 Sydney Olympics ===
Lim composed several pieces of work for both the 2000 Summer Olympics opening ceremony and the 2000 Summer Olympics closing ceremony. He composed "Nature", an opening ceremony piece, as well as "Journey of Angels", which was played during the placing of the flags. Lim also produced two works for the opening ceremony, including "Heroes Live Forever", as well as "Dare To Dream", which was sung by Olivia Newton-John and long-time colleague and friend John Farnham.

The closing ceremony also included production by Lim, such as "Under the Southern Skies", which was performed by Nikki Webster. He also produced "We'll Be One", also sang by Webster during the opening ceremonies, as well as arranging "Dancing Queen" sung by Kylie Minogue at the closing ceremony.

All of Lim's original scores of his compositions can now be found in the National Archives of Australia in Canberra.

=== Mainstream Events ===
Lim was the musical director of the Australian segment during the closing ceremony for the 2002 Commonwealth Games in Manchester and also directed the record of "Don't Dream It's Over" sung by Sarah Blasko and was produced by Paul Kelly at the 2006 Commonwealth Games in Melbourne. Lim also composed musical scores for the opening ceremony of the 2006 Asian Games held in Doha. From 2010 and the six years following, Lim was the musical director for the Melbourne Cup Opening Ceremonies, and was the musical director of the 2015 AFC Asian Cup in Melbourne. Lim also continued these successes globally, where was an arranger for the 2014 Commonwealth Games in Glasgow.

More recently, Lim has worked on National Sporting Event entertainment such as musically directing the 2020 AFL Grand Final and 2021 AFL Grand Final half time show, in which he also arranged for and conducted the Queensland Symphony Orchestra in 2020. Lim was also the musical director for the 2020-21 Big Bash League season in Tasmania, as well as the musical director and producer of the Opening entertainment for the 2021 Australian Open and 2022 Australian Open Women's Semi and Grand Final.

=== John Farnham ===
Lim began working for John Farnham in 1994, working as his musical director. Since this beginning, Lim has been a long-standing band and crew member, musically directing almost every tour and event that Farnham has conducted. These include:

Date	Event
1994	Talk of the Town Tour
1996	Jack of Hearts Tour
1998	The Main Event Featuring Olivia Newton-John and Anthony Warlow
2000	Man of the Hour Tour
2002	The Last Time Tour
2005	Together in Concert Featuring Tom Jones
2006	Songs from the Great Australian Songbook Featuring the Melbourne Symphony Orchestra
2011	Whispering Jack 25 Years On
2014	Lionel Richie and John Farnham
2014	One Stage, Two Legends
2015	John Farnham and Olivia Newton-John
2015	One Night Only with Daryl Braithwaite, Ross Wilson
2017	Red Hot Summer
2019	Red Hot Summer with Thirsty Merc, Daryl Braithwaite, Vanessa Amorosi, Jon Stevens and Dragon (band)
2020	Falls Festival
2020	Fire Fight Australia

In 2016 Lim also produced John Farnham and Olivia Newton-John's Christmas album Friends for Christmas.’

=== Television ===
From 1999 to 2008 Lim was the musical director for the Australian Logie Awards, which is broadcast nationally each year. Since 2004 Lim has worked as musical director for the Australian version of Dancing with the Stars, running for 15 consecutive seasons. Lim musically directed for the Australian talent show It Takes Two, which ran for three seasons from 2006 to 2008 and has been music director of the Victorian Schools Spectacular since 2011. In 2020 Lim also musically directed and arranged for Amy Shark at the ARIA Music Awards.

=== Directing and composition ===
Lim began his musical directing career in Australia in 1997, when he directed and composed a group of works for the opening of the Atrium Crown Melbourne, which still plays to this day. This included not only works of Lim's production, but also live conducting with the Melbourne Symphony Orchestra. In 1998 Lim co-produced the original I Still Call Australia Home Qantas Advertisements with Lindsay Field. In 1998 Lim secured the role of musical director for Grease: The Arena Spectacular, which returned for a second season in Melbourne, Sydney and Brisbane. Lim has also continued to direct and compose in the Asia-Pacific region, including Citrawarna in Kuala Lumpur, Bali Agung for the Bali Marine and Safari Park, and Pearl of the Seas in the Jakarta Aquarium.

From 2000, Lim continued to direct shows in Australia, including the Motown Tour in 2009 (feat The Four Tops, The Temptations, Martha Reeves, The Miracles, Mary Wilson) to The Mission Estate Concert with the Auckland Philharmonia Orchestra in 2014, Dirty Dancing: The Classic Story on Stage in 2015 to Disney Under the Stars in 2015 (featuring David Campbell, Ricki-Lee Coulter, Harrison Craig and Lucy Durack). Lim was also the co-creator and musical director of Rolling Thunder the Musical.

In 2017 Lim directed his first Good Friday Appeal Super Show in Melbourne, becoming an annual occurrence.

== Discography ==
=== Charted albums ===
List of charted albums, with selected details and chart positions
Title	Details	Peak chart positions
Title	Details	AUS
Dancing with the Stars (Chong Lim Band)	Released: April 2005; Label: Shock (DANCECD1); Format: CD	30
Let's Go Dancing (Chong Lim and His Orchestra)	Released: 2008; Label: Mercury (1791064); Format: CD	100

=== Production discography ===
In 2001 Lim produced Nikki Webster's "Strawberry Kisses", which peaked at number two on the ARIA Charts for seven consecutive weeks. It was certified gold by ARIA in its second week, and was shortly after certified platinum. Lim went on to produce David Campbell's third and fourth studio albums The Swing Sessions and The Swing Sessions 2 in 2006 and 2007 (both certified platinum), also producing Campbell's tenth studio album Back in the Swing in 2019. In 2011 Lim Produced Sarah McKenzie's first and second studio albums Don't Tempt Me and Close Your Eyes, which were both nominated for Best Jazz Album at the ARIA Awards, with Close Your Eyes winning the ARIA for that year. He also produced her studio album Secrets of My Heart, which was recorded in New York.

== Tours ==
In 1998 Lim was the musical director for Kylie Minogue's Intimate and Live tour in support of her album Impossible Princess. Lim went on in 1999 to musically direct Olivia Newton-John's One Woman's Journey Tour in the United States.

In 2015, Lim was the musical director of the All You Need Is Love Tour, going on in 2017 to direct the Elvis The Wonder of You Tour in Australia.

== Awards ==
=== ARIA Music Awards ===
The ARIA Music Awards is an annual awards ceremony that recognises excellence, innovation, and achievement across all genres of the music of Australia.

Year	Nominee / work	Award	Result
2012	Sarah McKenzie's Close Your Eyes	Producer of the Year	Nominated

=== Helpmann Awards ===
Year	Nominee / work	Award	Result
2019	Rolling Thunder	Best Composer	Nominated

== Sources ==
- Australian Musician, issue 14, Winter 1998
