= Good Lovin' (album) =

Studio album by David Campbell
- Released: 17 November 2008
- Genre: Blue eyed soul, vocal jazz, traditional pop
- Length: 42.12
- Label: Columbia
- Producer: Chong Lim

David Campbell chronology
First and Foremost (2008)	Good Lovin' (2008)	On Broadway (2010)

Good Lovin' is the fifth studio album by Australian singer David Campbell, released in November 2008. It is a collection of songs described by Campbell as 'blue-eyed soul', mostly from the 1960s. AllMusic describes it as a blue eyed soul, vocal jazz, and traditional pop.

Good Lovin' achieved platinum sales in Australia.

== Track listing ==
1. Intro
2. 1-2-3
3. Good Lovin'
4. You've Lost That Lovin' Feelin' (featuring Jimmy Barnes)
5. Keep on Running
6. How Can I Be Sure
7. Jackie Wilson Said (I'm in Heaven When You Smile)
8. Tell It Like It Is
9. You've Made Me So Very Happy
10. Yeh Yeh
11. Baby Now That I've Found You
12. Suspicious Minds
13. Devil with the Blue Dress

== Bonus tracks on re-release (Keep on Lovin') ==
1. Saturday in the Park
2. Since I Don't Have You
3. Gimme Some Loving
4. Smoke Gets in Your Eyes
5. White Christmas

== Charts and certifications ==
=== Weekly charts ===
Chart (2008/09)	Peak position
Australian Albums (ARIA)	10

=== Year-end charts ===
Chart (2008)	Position
Australian Albums Chart	51
Australian Artist Albums Chart	13
Chart (2009)	Position
Australian Albums Chart	69
Australian Artist Albums Chart	19

=== Certifications ===
Region	Certification	Certified units/sales
Australia (ARIA)	Platinum	70,000^{^}
^{^} Shipments figures based on certification alone.
