= The Swing Sessions =

Studio album by David Campbell
- Released: 6 November 2006
- Genre: Swing
- Length: 45:30
- Label: Columbia
- Producer: Chong Lim

David Campbell chronology
Shout! The Legend of The Wild One (2001)	The Swing Sessions (2006)	The Swing Sessions 2 (2007)

The Swing Sessions is the third studio album by Australian singer/actor David Campbell. It was released in Australia in November 2006, and achieved platinum status.

It was followed a year later by The Swing Sessions 2.

== Track listing ==
1. "You're Nobody till Somebody Loves You"
2. "Call Me Irresponsible"
3. "Mack the Knife"
4. "The Way You Look Tonight"
5. "Love Me or Leave Me"
6. "Can't Take My Eyes off You"
7. "Birth of the Blues"
8. "All the Way"
9. "Waters of March"
10. "Beyond the Sea"
11. "Mr Bojangles"
12. "With Plenty of Money and You"
13. "My Funny Valentine"

== Charts ==
=== Weekly charts ===
Chart (2006/07)	Peak position
Australian Albums (ARIA)	7
New Zealand Albums (RMNZ)	8

=== Year-end charts ===
Chart (2006)	Position
Australian Artist Albums Chart	16
Chart (2007)	Position
Australian Albums Chart	81
Australian Artist Albums Chart	29

=== Certifications ===
Region	Certification	Certified units/sales
Australia (ARIA)	Platinum	70,000^{^}
^{^} Shipments figures based on certification alone.
