= The Swing Sessions 2 =

Studio album by David Campbell
- Released: 23 October 2007
- Genre: Swing
- Length: 45:20
- Label: Columbia
- Producer: Chong Lim

David Campbell chronology
The Swing Sessions (2006)	The Swing Sessions 2 (2007)	First and Foremost (2008)

The Swing Sessions 2 is the fourth studio album from Australian swing singer/actor David Campbell and was released in October 2007.

The Swing Sessions 2 followed the suit of its predecessor The Swing Sessions as a nod to many swing singers of the past; with tracks recorded by Campbell with a slightly more modern slant. The album achieved platinum sales in Australia.

== Track listing ==
1. "Witchcraft" (Cy Coleman, 1957)
2. "Perhaps, Perhaps Perhaps" (Nat "King" Cole, 1949)
3. "Lazy River" (Hoagy Carmichael and Sidney Arodin, 1930
4. "Route 66" (Nat "King" Cole, 1946)
5. "I've Got a Crush on You" (George Gershwin and Ira Gershwin, 1928)
6. "Danke Schoen" (Bert Kaempfert, 1962)
7. "Just a Gigolo/I Ain't Got Nobody" (Louis Prima, 1956)
8. "Begin the Beguine" (Cole Porter, 1935)
9. "That Old Black Magic" (Harold Arlen and Johnny Mercer, 1942)
10. "Summer Wind" (Henry Mayer and Johnny Mercer, 1965)
11. "There Will Never Be Another You" (Harry Warren and Mack Gordon, 1942)
12. "That's Life" (Frank Sinatra, 1966)
13. "One for My Baby" (Harold Arlen and Johnny Mercer, 1943)
14. "King of the Road" (Roger Miller, 1965)

== Charts ==
=== Weekly charts ===
Chart (2007–2008)	Peak position
Australian Albums (ARIA)	8

=== Year-end charts ===
Chart (2007)	Position
Australian Albums Chart	33
Chart (2008)	Position
Australian Artist Albums Chart	41

== Certifications ==
Region	Certification	Certified units/sales
Australia (ARIA)	Platinum	70,000^{^}
^{^} Shipments figures based on certification alone.
