= On Broadway (David Campbell album) =

Studio album by David Campbell
- Released: 2 April 2010
- Genre: Musical theatre
- Length: TBC
- Label: Columbia
- Producers: Rob Fisher, Bill Elliott

David Campbell chronology
Good Lovin' (2008)	On Broadway (2010)	Let's Go (2011)

On Broadway (sometimes referred to as David Campbell On Broadway) is the sixth studio album from Australian singer/actor David Campbell, released in Australia on 2 April 2010. On Broadway marks a departure by Campbell from his previous albums of swing and rock music, back to the genre of musical theatre through which he first rose to fame. The album reached number seven on the Australian national ARIA chart.

The album was produced by leading musical director Rob Fisher and veteran arranger Bill Elliott, and recorded with a 40-piece orchestra at East West Studios, Los Angeles in January 2010.

An accompanying television documentary David Campbell On Broadway was filmed by Campbell's production company Luckiest Productions at the same time, and aired in Australia on arts channel STVDIO on Saturday 3 April.

== Track listing ==
1. "Overture"
2. "Oh, What a Beautiful Mornin'" – from Oklahoma!
3. "When I Get My Name In Lights" – from Legs Diamond / The Boy From Oz
4. "Hey There" – from The Pajama Game
5. "Hello, Dolly!" – from Hello, Dolly!
6. "Bring Him Home" – from Les Misérables
7. "Being Alive" – from Company
8. "All I Care About" – from Chicago
9. "You'll Never Walk Alone" – from Carousel
10. "Proud Lady" – from The Baker's Wife
11. "Luck Be A Lady" – from Guys & Dolls
12. "What Kind Of Fool Am I?" – from Stop the World - I Want to Get Off
13. "Goodbye" – from Catch Me If You Can
14. "Some Other Time" – from On The Town

== Charts and certifications ==
=== Weekly charts ===
Chart (2010)	Peak position
Australian Albums (ARIA)	7

=== Year-end charts ===
Chart (2010)	Position
Australian Artist Albums Chart	31

=== Certifications ===
Region	Certification	Certified units/sales
Australia (ARIA)	Gold	35,000^{^}
^{^} Shipments figures based on certification alone.
