= Johann Fischer (composer) =

German violinist, keyboardist and composer

Johann Fischer (1646–1716) was a German violinist, keyboardist and composer of the baroque era. His name is not to be confused with another composer named Johann Fischer, born in Lübeck and listed by Johannes Moller in Cimbria literata (v. I, p. 176). He is mentioned as a good clavier and violin player, who is said to have especially loved the return of the strings and, in this way, he mainly composed for the violin and also the viola, which he sought to write for in his overtures. In any case, his works are of historical interest since they are likely to betray the influence of the then French instrumental music.

== Biography ==
Johann Fischer was born in Augsburg, in Swabia, as the son of town piper Jonas Fischer and Maria, née Mayr. He had music lessons with his father as well as with cantor Tobias Kriegsdorfer (1608–1686). From 1661 to 1664 he was then further instructed in music in the orchestra at the Württemberg court in Stuttgart by Kapellmeister Samuel Capricornus. After Capricornus' death in 1665, Fischer worked for five years in Paris where he was a scribe for Jean-Baptiste Lully, the Kapellmeister of Louis XIV.

In 1673 he was back in the Stuttgart court orchestra, and a year later he became a church musician at the Barfüßerkirche in Augsburg, where he was employed until 1677. During his time, about 60 pieces of church music were composed. He then married Antonia Sybilla who gave him between 1675 and 1681 five children, but his life was in music and so he returned to his home town. In 1683 he had a job for three years as a violinist, teacher and composer in the court orchestra of the Duke of Ansbach who was very much fond of French music. From 1686 Fischer took over as head director of the chapel, but after the death of Margrave Johann Friedrich, Fischer was released from his duties that same year. His successor, Margrave George Friedrich was then fond of a more Italian direction.

From 1690 to 1697 he held a similar position in Jelgava (Jelgava today in Latvia), in the court of the Duke of Courland Frederick Casimir Kettler, and after the dissolution of the chapel, he lived for a time in Riga. In the late 1690s he developed a lively fishing habit which took him all across Europe. In 1700 he found a position in Lüneburg, and in 1701 he played in Poland vor Ihro Maj. dem Könige von Polen zu dero hoher Zufriedenheit. In 1702 he became Kapellmeister in the chapel of Karl Leopold, Duke of Mecklenburg-Schwerin. In 1704 he went on a disappointing trip to Copenhagen where he had hoped for a job in the royal court orchestra. Fischer was in Bayreuth in 1707, after which he lived in Stralsund, Stockholm, and Szczecin. In his last years he was Kapellmeister to Philip William, Margrave of Brandenburg-Schwedt, but of a rather flighty disposition, he soon gave this post up and moved around between Copenhagen, Stralsund and Stockholm. Finally, he became Kapellmeister to the Margrave of Schwedt, where he died at the age of seventy years.

== Musical works ==
Fischer's compositions are similar to those by Johann Sigismund Kusser, as his traditional chamber music suggests. He wrote various collections of songs, the most important being a collection of fifty French songs and another collection of madrigals and Lieder. His melodies are original and his harmonies and rhythms varied. In his work, scordatura is often required for the viola. He also wrote instrumental works. Johann Mattheson writes that Fischer's music was highly praised and frequently played, although his extensive work on church music, consisting of numerous cantatas and motets, is still little explored. His works are listed by Ernst Ludwig Gerber in his Lexikon der Tonkünstler (v. II, p. 133).

=== Compositions ===
- Musikalische Mayen-Lust, a 7 (Augsburg, 1681)
- So wünsch ich manche gute Nacht, Die Motette (Augsburg, 1681) (Dubious authorship)
- Himmlische Seelen-Lust for Violin and accompaniment (Nuremberg, 1686)
- Musicalisches Divertissement, a 2 (Dresden, 1699)
- Neuverfertigtes musicalisches Divertissement, a 4 (Augsburg, 1700)
- TafelMusik, a 3, 4 (Hamburg, 1702)
- Musicalische Fürsten Lust...., a 4 (Augsburg, 1706)
- Feld- und Heldenmusik (Augsburg, 1706)
- Ouverture (Suite) a 5 F-Dur for Oboe, 2 Violins, Viola (or Oboe, Violin, 2 Violas) and B.c.
- Vier Suiten für Blockflöte (Violin, Flute, Oboe, Viola) with Bass (Cembalo with Gamba, Cello, Lute, also Cembalo bzw. Cembalo only or Gamba, Cello and Lute)
- Balletto a 4 in C minor (1690):
  - Sonatina
  - Allemanda
  - Menuet
  - Menuet
  - Bourrée
  - Sarabande in C minor for Violino, Piccolo discordato, Bass, Viola and Basso continuo (Violone, Harp and Cembalo)
- Trost-Klang (Instrumental)
