= Let's Go (David Campbell album) =

Studio album by David Campbell
- Released: 18 November 2011
- Recorded: Chamber Studios, Blackfoot Sound
- Genre: Rock
- Length: 45:51
- Label: Sony Music Australia
- Producers: David Campbell, Dorian West

David Campbell chronology
On Broadway (2010)	Let's Go (2011)	David Campbell Sings John Bucchino (2014)

Let's Go is the seventh studio album by Australian singer David Campbell, released in November 2011. The album is a collection of songs from the 1980s.

Campbell toured the album nationally in 2012.

== Track listing ==
CD/DD (88697987582)

1. "Shout to the Top" (Paul Weller) - 3:32
2. "Tainted Love" (Ed Cobb) - 2:37
3. "Let's Go" (Jack Hues, Nick Feldman)- 4:55
4. "I'm Your Man" (George Michael) - 4:48
5. "Don't You Want Me" with Josie Lane (Jo Callis, Adrian Wright, Philip Oakey)- 3:59
6. "Goody Two Shoes" (Adam Ant, Marco Pirroni)- 3:14
7. "True" (Gary Kemp) - 4:39
8. "Missing You" (Charles Sandford, John Waite, Mark Leonard) - 3:43
9. "Come on Eileen" (Kevin Adams, James Patterson, Kevin Rowland)- 4:39
10. "I Can Dream About You" (Dan Hartman) - 3:20
11. "Only You" (Vince Clarke) - 3:40
12. "You Make My Dreams" (Daryl Hall & John Oates) - 2:57

== Charts ==
=== Weekly charts ===
Chart (2011)	Peak position
Australian Albums (ARIA)	23

=== Year-end charts ===
Chart (2011)	Position
Australian Artist Albums Chart	30
