= David Campbell (singer) =

Australian singer and actor (born 1973)

David Campbell OAM
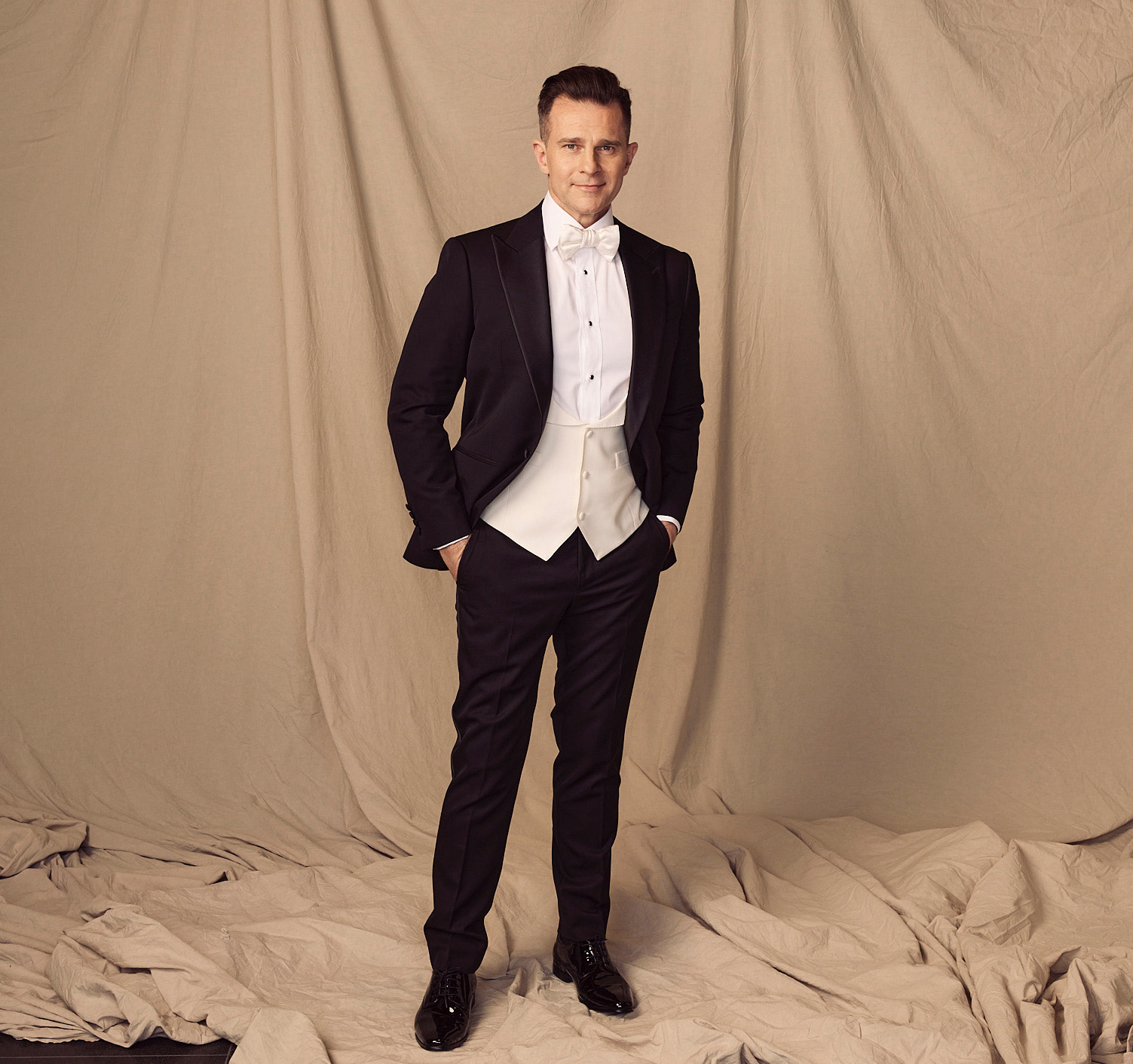
- Campbell backstage at the 2024 Logie Awards

Background information
- Born: David Joseph Campbell; 6 August 1973 (age 53); Adelaide, South Australia, Australia
- Origin: Sydney, New South Wales, Australia
- Genres: Swing; musical theatre; pop; rock; jazz
- Occupations: Singer; stage performer; TV presenter; artistic director
- Years active: 1993–present
- Labels: Sony, Social Family Records
- Spouse: Lisa Hewitt (m. 2008)
- Website: http://www.davidcampbell.com

David Joseph Campbell OAM (born 6 August 1973) is an Australian singer, actor, and TV personality. He is best known as the host of Nine Network's breakfast TV program Today Extra with Belinda Russell and as a multi-platinum-selling recording artist. He is the son of singer Jimmy Barnes.

== Career ==
=== Theatre career ===
Campbell began working professionally in Australia in 1993, after extensive training in youth theatre, during which he won an Australia Day award for his contribution to youth stars. Campbell attracted attention in Sydney with his role in the hit Australian play Relative Merits.

In 1995, Campbell starred in the revival of Alex Harding's musical, Only Heaven Knows, for which he was nominated for a MO Award for Best Musical Theatre Performer of the Year.

In 1997, Campbell travelled to New York and performed in the Tony Award-winning Love! Valor! Compassion!.

Campbell appeared in Les Misérables in the role of Marius. He also was a replacement actor for the role of Chris in the original West End production of Miss Saigon. Campbell won the MO Award for Best Featured Actor in a Musical and New York Backstage Bistro Award as Outstanding Vocalist of the Year.

Campbell also performed in South Pacific, Guys and Dolls – and in Hey, Mr. Producer!. In 2000, he provided the singing voice for the character Joseph and doubled as the singing narrator for DreamWorks Animation's direct-to-video film Joseph: King of Dreams, and a notable song was You Know Better Than I. He appeared as Jimmy opposite Kristin Chenoweth in a demo workshop of Thoroughly Modern Millie.

In 2001, Campbell appeared in the Australian musical Shout! The Legend of The Wild One, the story of rocker Johnny O'Keefe. Since 2001 he has made occasional stage appearances in Australia, in musicals such as Carousel, Sunset Boulevard, and Company. His performance in Sunset Boulevard earned Campbell the award for Best Male Actor in a Musical at the 6th Helpmann Awards.

In 2016, Campbell played the title role in Dream Lover – The Bobby Darin Musical. For Dream Lover, Campbell received his second Helpmann Award for Best Male Actor in a Musical. The musical became the highest selling show of all time at Arts Centre Melbourne.

=== Recording career ===
In 1997, Campbell released his debut album, Yesterday is Now. This was followed with his second album in the same year, Taking the Wheel.

In 2006, Campbell released The Swing Sessions.

In 2008, David released Good Lovin', an album of songs from the 1960s. A live DVD of the accompanying Good Lovin' Live tour hit number one on the Australian DVD chart.

Campbell's album, On Broadway was released in January 2010. On Broadway was released in Australia on 2 April 2010, with a tie-in television documentary David Campbell on Broadway airing on arts channel STVDIO the following day.

On 18 November 2011, an album of early 1980s music called Let's Go was released in Australia.

In June 2014, David released David Campbell Sings John Bucchino, recorded in Australia in May 2014 featuring John Bucchino playing piano.

In the Australian and New Zealand version of Disney's 2016 animated film Zootopia, Campbell voices a Koala news anchor.

In September 2016, played the title role in Dream Lover: The Bobby Darin Musical in Sydney. A cast recording was released in September 2016 by Sony Music Australia, featuring Campbell. It debuted at number 9 on the ARIA Charts.

In 2018, Campbell released his first Christmas album, Baby It's Christmas.

In April 2019, Campbell released Back in the Swing.

In September 2021, Campbell released his eleventh studio album, The Saturday Sessions, featuring his take on songs that have shaped his life and career regardless of genre or era.

=== Television and radio ===
Campbell was a contestant on the third season of Dancing with the Stars. He has also featured on two series of the celebrity singing competition It Takes Two. He won the second series in 2007, with celebrity partner Jolene Anderson.

Campbell appeared on Hey Hey It's Saturday, and co-hosted The Morning Show with Kylie Gillies occasionally when Larry Emdur was away.

Since 2011, Campbell has co-hosted Today Extra (formerly Mornings on the Nine Network. He currently hosts the show alongside Sylvia Jeffreys.

Since 2013, Campbell has co-hosted Vision Australia's Carols by Candlelight, broadcast live on Channel Nine on Christmas Eve each year.

In January 2019, Campbell was appointed co-host of Weekend Today replacing Peter Stefanovic. He remained in the position until December 2019. It was announced that in 2020, Campbell would host Today Extra full time with Richard Wilkins replacing him on Weekend Today.

In April 2020, Campbell hosted Music from the Home Front, a music concert recorded from musicians homes and broadcast on the Nine Network during the COVID-19 pandemic.

Campbell started on smoothfm in May 2012. He is currently the host of weekend Afternoons (1pm – 4pm) on smoothfm 91.5 in Melbourne and smoothfm 95.3 in Sydney.

=== Adelaide Cabaret Festival ===
Campbell was appointed artistic director of the Adelaide Cabaret Festival in 2008, and his programming began with the June 2009 festival. The 2011 Cabaret Festival was his last as artistic director.

In 2020, he received the Adelaide Cabaret Festival Icon Award, which acknowledges pioneering and leading figures who have had a significant impact on the Australian Cabaret industry.

== Personal life ==
Campbell is the son of Cold Chisel frontman and singer Jimmy Barnes. He was raised by his maternal grandmother and believed, until he was about ten years old, that his grandmother was his mother and his actual mother was his sister.

Since achieving his own success, he has performed with his father Jimmy Barnes on numerous occasions, including on an episode of Dancing with the Stars and at Carols by Candlelight. Both father and son have recorded duets for each other's studio albums.

He married Lisa Hewitt in 2008 and they have three children.

Campbell was awarded a Medal of the Order of Australia in 2019, for services to entertainment and the arts.

He was appointed to the board of the Sydney Opera House in 2022.

== Discography ==
=== Studio albums ===
| Title | Details | Peak chart positions | Certifications (thresholds) |
| Title | Details | AUS | Certifications (thresholds) |
|---|---|---|---|
| Yesterday is Now | Released: 1997; Label: Polydor; Format: CD | — | |
| Taking the Wheel | Released: 1997; Label: Polydor; Format: CD | — | |
| The Swing Sessions | Released: 4 November 2006; Label: Sony; Format: CD, digital download | 7 | ARIA: Platinum |
| The Swing Sessions 2 | Released: 3 November 2007; Label: Sony; Format: CD, digital download | 8 | ARIA: Platinum |
| Good Lovin' | Released: 15 November 2008; Label: Sony; Format: CD, digital download | 10 | ARIA: Platinum |
| On Broadway | Released: 2 April 2010; Label: Sony; Format: CD, digital download | 7 | ARIA: Gold |
| Let's Go | Released: 18 November 2011; Label: Sony; Format: CD, digital download | 23 | |
| David Campbell Sings John Bucchino | Released: 13 June 2014; Label: Social Family Records; Format: CD, digital download | 37 | |
| Baby It's Christmas | Released: 26 October 2018; Label: Sony; Format: CD, digital download, streaming; First Christmas album | 12 | |
| Back in the Swing | Released: 26 April 2019; Label: Sony; Format: CD, digital download, streaming | 10 | |
| The Saturday Sessions | Released: 3 September 2021; Label: Sony; Format: CD, digital download, streaming | 33 | |

=== Original Cast albums ===
| Title | Details | Peak chart positions | Certifications (thresholds) |
| Title | Details | AUS | Certifications (thresholds) |
|---|---|---|---|
| Only Heaven Knows (Australian Cast recording featuring David Campbell) | Released: 2000 | | |
| Shout! The Legend of The Wild One (Australian Cast recording featuring David Campbell) | Released: March 2001; Label: Epic Records; Format: CD | 19 | ARIA: Gold |
| Dream Lover: The Bobby Darin Musical (Australian Cast recording featuring David Campbell) | Released: 23 September 2016; Label: Dream Lover Records; Format: CD, digital download | 9 | |

=== Compilation albums ===
| Album title | Album details | Peak chart positions |
| Album title | Album details | AUS |
|---|---|---|
| First and Foremost | Released: 16 August 2008; Label: Universal Music Australia; Format: CD, digital download; Compilation album featuring songs from first two studio albums | — (Note: First and Foremost did not enter the ARIA Top 100, but peaked at number 16 on ARIA Jazz and Blues Chart.) |
| The Essential David Campbell | Released: 21 August 2015; Label: Sony Music Australia; Format: CD, digital download; First greatest hits album | — |

=== DVDs ===
| Title | Details | Peak chart positions | Certifications (thresholds) |
| Title | Details | AUS | Certifications (thresholds) |
|---|---|---|---|
| Good Lovin' Live | Released: April 2009; Label: Sony Music Australia; Format: DVD | 1 | ARIA: Platinum |
| Keep on Lovin' | Released: November 2009; Label: Sony Music Australia; Format: DVD | 15 | |
| The Broadway Show | Released: November 2010; Label: Sony Music Australia; Format: DVD | - | |

=== Singles ===
List of singles, with year released, Australian chart positions and album name shown
| Title | Year | Peak chart positions | Album |
| Title | Year | AUS | Album |
|---|---|---|---|
| "Hope" | 2003 | 8 | Non-album singles |
| "When She's Gone" | 2003 | 25 | Non-album singles |
| "End of the World" | 2005 | 47 | Non-album singles |
| "Mack The Knife" | 2006 | — | The Swing Sessions |
| "Perhaps, Perhaps, Perhaps" | 2007 | — | The Swing Sessions 2 |
| "You've Lost That Lovin' Feelin'" (with Jimmy Barnes) | 2008 | — (Note: "You've Lost That Lovin' Feelin'" did not enter the ARIA Top 100, but peaked at number 32 on the ARIA physical sales) | Good Lovin' |
| "Tainted Love" | 2011 | — | Let's Go |
| "Shout to the Top" | 2012 | — | Let's Go |
| "Come On Eileen" | 2012 | — | Let's Go |
| "What You Need" | 2014 | — | David Campbell Sings John Bucchino |
| "Falling Slowly" (with Kate Ceberano) | 2014 | — | non-album single |
| "Total Eclipse of the Heart" (live) (with Sylvia Jeffreys featuring The Australian Girls Choir) | 2017 | — | non-album single |
| "I Can't Help Myself (Sugar Pie Honey Bunch)" | 2019 | — | Back in the Swing |
| "Saltwater" | 2021 | — | The Saturday Sessions |

=== Other appearances ===
List of other non-single song appearances
| Title | Year | Album |
|---|---|---|
| "This Is It" | 1995 | Only Heaven Knows |
| "Night-Time in the City" (with Anthony Cogin, Jason Langley, Garry Scale and Jacqy Phillips) | 1995 | Only Heaven Knows |
| "Sydney You're Wonderful" | 1995 | Only Heaven Knows |
| "Asking Me Questions" (with Jason Langley) | 1995 | Only Heaven Knows |
| "Lucky for You" (with Anthony Cogin and Jacqy Phillips) | 1995 | Only Heaven Knows |
| "Only Heaven Knows" | 1995 | Only Heaven Knows |
| "I'm Martin Guerre" | 1998 | Hey, Mr. Producer! |
| "The Heat Is on in Saigon" (with Lea Salonga) | 1998 | Hey, Mr. Producer! |
| "Last Night of the World" (with Lea Salonga) | 1998 | Hey, Mr. Producer! |
| "Better Than I" | 2000 | Grateful: The Songs of John Bucchino |
| "Weir" | 2001 | The Andrew Denton Breakfast Show Musical Challenge 2: Even More Challenged! |
| "Working Class Man" | 2002 | Triple M Musical Challenge 3 – Third Time Lucky! |
| "I Will Be Right Here" (with Olivia Newton-John) | 2002 | 2 |
| "Santa Claus Is Coming to Town" | 2003 | The Spirit of Christmas 2003 |
| "Run to Paradise" | 2004 | Thunderstruck (soundtrack) |
| "Wichita Lineman" (with Jimmy Barnes) | 2005 | Double Happiness (Jimmy Barnes album) |
| "Stand Up for Judas" | 2005 | And They All Sang RosselSongs |
| "Sailing" | 2006 | Home: Songs of Hope & Journey |
| "Christmas (Baby Please Come Home)" | 2006 | The Spirit of Christmas 2006 |
| "That's What Friends Are For" (with Jolene Anderson) | 2007 | The Spirit of Christmas 2007 |
| "The Greatest Act in History" (with Bert Labonte) | 2008 | The Black Balloon (soundtrack) |
| "Move It On Over" (with Adam Harvey) | 2009 | Both Sides Now |
| "Jingle Bell Rock" | 2009 | Stars of Christmas |
| "Love Somebody" (with Melinda Schneider) | 2010 | Melinda Does Doris |
| "Baby It's Cold Outside" (with Kate Ceberano) | 2010 | Merry Christmas |
| "You'll Never Walk Alone" | 2011 | Floodlight – Barnes Family Songs for Flood Relief |
| "Around the World" (with Jimmy Barnes and Mahalia Barnes) | 2011 | Floodlight – Barnes Family Songs for Flood Relief |
| "She's My Baby" | 2011 | Floodlight – Barnes Family Songs for Flood Relief |
| "Love Me Tender" (with Jimmy Barnes and Mahalia Barnes) | 2011 | Floodlight – Barnes Family Songs for Flood Relief |
| "Sun & Moon" (with Rachael Beck) | 2014 | This Girl |
| "Walk On" (with Jimmy Barnes) | 2014 | 30:30 Hindsight (Jimmy Barnes album) |
| "I Wan'na Be Like You" | 2014 | We Love Disney |
| "Mr Wardrove" (with The Wiggles) | 2015 | Rock & Roll Preschool |
| "Everyone's Waiting for the Man with the Bag" (with Jimmy Giggle) | 2015 | Jimmy Giggle's Christmas Party |

== Filmography ==
=== Films ===
| Year | Title | Role | Notes |
|---|---|---|---|
| 2000 | Joseph: King of Dreams | Joseph (singing voice) | Direct-to-video |
| 2006 | Em 4 Jay | Mick | Feature film |
| 2015 | The Wiggles: Rock & Roll Preschool | Mr. Wardrobe | TV movie |

=== Television ===
| Year | Title | Role | Notes |
|---|---|---|---|
| 1993 | G.P. | Jamie | 1 episode |
| 2002 | Young Lions | Grant Fisher | Miniseries, 1 episode |
| 2004 | Love My Way | Dominic, Shop Assistant | 2 episodes |
| 2005 | The Alice | —N/a | 1 episode |
| 2015 | House of Hancock | Willie Porteous | 2 episodes |
| 2015 | The Wiggles: Specials | Mr. Wardrobe | 1 episode |
| 2018 | Doctor Doctor | Presenter | 1 episode |
| 2024 | Smooth Angels | Himself | 1 episode |

=== Video games ===
| Year | Title | Role | Notes |
|---|---|---|---|
| 1999 | M.U.G.E.N. | —N/a | |

== Awards and nominations ==
| Year | Work | Association | Award | Results |
|---|---|---|---|---|
| 1993 | David Campbell | Australia Day Honours | Australia Day Award for Contribution to Youth Stars | Honoured |
| 1997 | David Campbell | Mo Awards | Male Musical Theatre of the Year | Won |
| 1998 | Les Misérables | New York Backstage Bistro Award | Outstanding Vocalist of the Year | Won |
| 2000 | David Campbell | Mo Awards | Supporting Musical Theatre Performer | Won |
| 2001 | Shout! The Legend of the Wild One | ARIA Music Awards | Best Original Cast or Show Album | Won |
| 2001 | Shout! The Legend of the Wild One | Helpmann Awards | Best Male Actor in a Musical | Nominated |
| 2006 | Sunset Boulevard | Helpmann Awards | Best Male Actor in a Musical | Won |
| 2006 | Sunset Boulevard | Helpmann Awards | Best Male Actor in a Musical | Won |
| 2006 | The 25th Annual Putnam County Spelling Bee | Helpmann Awards | Best Male Actor in a Musical | Nominated |
| 2007 | Wild With Style | Helpmann Awards | Best Performance in an Australian Contemporary Concert | Won |
| 2007 | David Campbell | Helpmann Awards | Best Australian Contemporary Concert | Nominated |
| 2008 | The Swing Sessions 2 | Helpmann Awards | Best Performance in an Australian Contemporary Concert | Won |
| 2015 | David Campbell Sings John Bucchino | Helpmann Awards | Best Cabaret Performer | Nominated |
| 2016 | Dream Lover: The Bobby Darin Musical | Helpmann Awards | Best Male Actor in a Musical | Won |
| 2017 | Dream Lover (Australian Cast Recording) | ARIA Music Awards | Best Original Soundtrack, Cast or Show Album | Nominated |
| 2018 | Dream Lover | Helpmann Awards | Best Male Actor in a Musical | Won |
| 2018 | Assassins | Helpmann Awards | Best Male Actor in a Musical | Nominated |
