= Only Heaven Knows =

Australian musical

Only Heaven Knows is a musical by Alex Harding. It is a gay romance set in Sydney's Kings Cross during the 1940s and 1950s.

== Productions ==
Only Heaven Knows premiered at Sydney's Griffin Theatre Company at the Stables Theatre in June 1988. A Melbourne production the following year by the Playbox Theatre Company performed at the Arts Centre's Studio Theatre.

A 1995 revival featuring David Campbell in the lead role of Tim transferred to the Playhouse at the Sydney Opera House and recorded a cast album. Other cast members included Anthony Cogin (Cliff, Uncle Kenny), Jason Langley (Alan), Jacqy Phillips (Guinea, Aunty Maureen, Drama Teacher, Doctor) and Garry Scale (The Ghost of Lea Sonia, Lana).

It was produced again in 2017 at Sydney's Hayes Theatre, starring Ben Hall as Tim and Tim Draxl as Cliff.

== Cast recording (1995 production) ==
1. "Prologue" by Garry Scale - 0:42
2. "This Is It" by David Campbell - 4:10
3. "Night-Time in the City" by David Campbell, Anthony Cogin, Jason Langley, Garry Scale and Jacqy Phillips - 2:20
4. "Sydney You're Wonderful by David Campbell - 2:51
5. "Would You Like That Too?" by Anthony Cogin & Garry Scale - 2:11
6. "Ain't It a Shame" by Jacqy Phillips - 3:20
7. "Asking Me Questions" by David Campbell and Jason Langley - 1:54
8. "Act I Scene 15" by Garry Scale - 1:34
9. "Act II Scene 1" by Garry Scale - 1:13
10. "Lucky for You" by Anthony Cogin, David Campbell and Jacqy Phillips - 1:51
11. "Where Is the Love?" by Jason Langley & Jacqy Phillips - 3:30
12. "Stealin'" by Garry Scale - 3:01
13. "Without Him" by Anthony Cogin - 1:35
14. "Only Heaven Knows" by David Campbell - 2:35
15. "Epilogue" by Garry Scale - 1:00
