= Gordon Hunt (musician) =

British oboist (born 1950)

- Born: 1950 (age 75–76); London, England
- Genres: Classical music
- Occupations: oboist; conductor; professor of music
- Instruments: XL Oboe (made by Howarth of London); Clarinet
- Years active: 1982–present

Gordon Hunt (born 1950) is a British musician and conductor. Regarded as one of the world's leading oboists, Hunt has served as principal oboe of the Philharmonia and London Chamber orchestras, a professor at the Guildhall School of Music and Drama, and an Honorary Associate of the Royal Academy of Music.

== Early life and education ==
Hunt was born in London in 1950. He is the son of Jean Anderson, a pianist, and Francis Hunt, a businessman and violinist. As a child, he was taken regularly to recitals and concerts by his parents, where he was encouraged to become an oboist.

Hunt studied under Terence MacDonagh.

== Career ==
Hunt has had a professional career as both a soloist, conductor, and as principal oboist of the Philharmonia Orchestra. He has held principal positions at the London Philharmonic and the London Chamber Orchestra, and has played as Guest Principal with the Berlin Philharmonic. He has also appeared as a soloist with conductors such as Vladimir Ashkenazy, Sir Andrew Davis, Carlo Maria Giulini, Kirill Kondrashin, Riccardo Muti, Sir John Pritchard, Sir Simon Rattle, Giuseppe Sinopoli and Franz Welser-Möst.

Hunt has made several CD recordings, from which tracks are regularly broadcast on Classic FM (UK) and other radio stations. He has made many musical recordings for BMG, EMI and Virgin, including all of Mozart’s solo music. His recording of the Richard Strauss Concerto with the Berlin Radio Symphony Orchestra and Vladimir Ashkenazy (Decca) has been named the finest available by the Penguin CD Guide. He has also made several recordings for BIS, including Elevazione, a disc of popular concertos which he also directed.

Hunt has conducted the National Symphony Orchestra of South Africa, the Johannesburg Philharmonic Orchestra, the Chamber Orchestra of South Africa, the Swedish Chamber Orchestra, the Norrköping Symphony Orchestra, the Aalborg Symphony Orchestra, the Christchurch Symphony Orchestra, the Danish Radio Sinfonietta and London's Southbank Sinfonia, and has conducted in the Budapest Spring Festival. Of a performance of the Mozart Oboe Concerto in Berlin, a critic wrote that "with his crystal clear, aristocratic tone, he undoubtedly ranks as one of the greatest exponents of his instrument."

Hunt was the original "Gabriel's Oboe" in the Morricone score for the 1986 period drama film The Mission.

Hunt was music director of the Swedish Chamber Winds from 1991 to 1997, and has worked with orchestras and wind ensembles across the continents. He was artistic director of the Danish Chamber Players from 2001 to 2004, and now works regularly with the Danish National Chamber Orchestra.

In the summer of 2005, Hunt played the Adagio from Albinoni’s D minor concerto at the wedding of Prince Charles and Camilla Parker Bowles.

In 2008, he was soloist with the Mormon Tabernacle Choir, televised live to over 30 million homes across the world. In 2010, Hunt was designated a UNESCO Artist for Peace. He is currently principal oboe of the World Orchestra for Peace and a member of the jury for the International Oboe Competition of Japan. In 2011, he conducted concerts in Brazil, and on tour with the winds of the New Zealand Symphony Orchestra. In 2022, he conducted concerts in the Traveling Notes festival in Tbilisi, Georgia.

== Discography ==
| Album | Year | Credits | Label | Ref |
|---|---|---|---|---|
| Mozart | 1982 | Chilingirian String Quartet; Andrew Marriner | Classics for Pleasure | |
| Mozart: Oboe Concerto, Flute and Harp Concerto | 1987 | Jonathan Snowden; Caryl Thomas; London Philharmonic Orchestra; Andrew Litton | EMI | |
| Jonathan Haas – 18th Century Concertos For Timpani And Orchestra | 1988 | Johann Fischer; Georg Druschetzky; Bournemouth Sinfonietta; Harold Farberman | CRD Records | |
| Mozart – Flute Concerto In G / Oboe Concerto / Sinfonia Concertante K297B / Flute And Harp Concerto | 1995 | Jonathan Snowden; Caryl Thomas; London Philharmonic Orchestra; Sir Charles Mackerras; Andrew Litton | EMI | |
| Bax / Bliss: Oboe Quintets / Britten: Phantasy Quartet | 1997 | — | BIS Records | |
| Soliloquy | 1998 | Benjamin Britten; Mary Chandler; Andrew Jackman; Gordon Jacob; Nicola LeFanu; Paul Reade; Neil Saunders | BIS Records | |
| Mozart – Clarinet Concerto, Clarinet Quintet, Oboe Quartet | 2001 | Andrew Marriner; London Mozart Players; Jane Glover; Chilingirian Quartet | Classics for Pleasure | |
| Elevazione – The Magic Of The Oboe | 2001 | — | BIS Records | |
| Wolfgang Amadeus Mozart – Divertiment / Symphony No. 29 / Adagio And Fugue | 2002 | Levon Chilingirian | DB Productions | |
| Harald Sæverud – Symphony No. 5 • Oboe Concerto • Entrata Regale • Sonata Giubilata | 2003 | Stavanger Symphony Orchestra; Ole Kristian Ruud | BIS Records | |
| Vagn Holmboe – Concertos For Piano, Clarinet And Oboe / Beatus Parvo | 2004 | Noriko Ogawa; Martin Fröst; Danish National Opera Choir; Aalborg Symfoniorkester; Owain Arwel Hughes | BIS Records | |
| The Danish Chamber Players + Gordon Hunt Play Jacques Ibert | 2010 | The Danish Chamber Players; Jacques Ibert | CDKlassisk | |
