= John Bucchino =

American songwriter

- Born: 1952 (age 73–74); South Philadelphia, Pennsylvania, U.S.
- Occupations: Songwriter, pianist, accompanist, cabaret performer, teacher
- Years active: 1980s–present
- Known for: A Catered Affair, Grateful, Urban Myths, It's Only Life
- Notable work: Grateful: A Song of Giving Thanks, Lavender Girl, Esaura
- Website: johnbucchino.com

John Bucchino (born 1952) is an American songwriter of both lyrics and music, an accompanist, a cabaret performer, and a teacher. He has been called "super-talented". Stephen Schwartz said his songs have "insightful lyrics and gorgeous melodies", "rich harmonic textures and subtle…inner voicings." His music has "beautiful intricacies."

== Career ==
Bucchino was born in South Philadelphia, son of an accountant; his family moved to Palm Springs, California when he was 12. He started writing songs in high school. After college he moved to Los Angeles. He never had music lessons of any sort. He does not read music, and he taught himself to play the piano by ear.

Bucchino did not seek out a career as songwriter for musicals; he "wanted to be a singer/songwriter/piano player ala Billy Joel or Elton John or Joni Mitchell". Bucchino has been an accompanist for Holly Near starting in the mid-1980s, and for the Australian singer David Campbell.

"He composes at the piano and makes cassette tapes which he gives to friends. For years, those amateur Bucchino tapes have been legendary among insiders in the music business, as singers and song-writers passed them around to each other with words of glowing praise." This was how he came to the attention of both Stephen Sondheim and Stephen Schwartz. Schwartz called him in 1987 and suggested he write for the theater. Bucchino relocated to New York in 1992. He has at times struggled; he was reported in 2000 as playing the piano in office-building lobbies at lunchtime.

Bucchino has been featured in Broadway revues and concerts, including Lincoln Center's American Songbook series, and given highly acclaimed concerts at venues such as Birdland, The Duplex, and The Hollywood Bowl.

== Performances ==
=== Musicals ===
- Urban Myths (1998), with book by James Waedekin, an English teacher and director of the theater program at El Segundo High School, is a series of seven short musical pieces based on tales of the peculiar, urban myths, like the woman who dried her dog in the microwave. That show received a production, with no press, at the Century II theater in Wichita, Kansas, in 1998. An article on Bucchino from 2000 says that it "had its premiere last season in Kansas City;" perhaps that is the same performance. A 1999 interview says it had "five readings" in New York. The only documented performance (as of 2019) was before an industry-only audience of musical theatre producers, at the 10th Annual Festival of New Musicals, New York, 1998.
  Three songs from Urban Myths were published in 2000 in the volume Grateful. The Songs of John Bucchino, with accompanying CD.
  - "Temporary" has "the outlandish setting of a mother flushing her son's baby alligator down the toilet, but was a touching lament about the ephemeral nature of life and its contents." It has also been published in TTBB arrangement.
  - "My brother died of AIDS in 1992 and I wanted to create an urban myth which was an AIDS story…a story we would like to see perpetuated into an urban myth. I wrote a song called "Not a Cloud in the Sky," ...and the line "You're not really about to die" just came out of nowhere; I didn't know it was coming! But once that line came out, I realized it could be the opening number for the AIDS myth."
  - Far and away Bucchino's most popular song is "Grateful". (Lyrics for "Grateful" .) "Not too long after that I wrote 'Grateful' and I thought 'Oh my God! This could be the closing song!' Then we had the difficult task of deciding what was going to happen between the two songs and who the characters were. That section turned into a beautiful story about a man who's dying of AIDS whose lover, the one who sings 'Not a Cloud in the Sky', is very clenched and in denial about the situation. Towards the end of the piece, when his lover asks, 'What do we have to be thankful for?', the man who's covered with lesions and dying sings 'Grateful'. So it's pretty powerful and makes his lover cry for the first time during the story. The piece is called 'Last Supper' and the man who's dying has requested a meal of all of his favorite foods, after which he's going to kill himself. And what happens is that his lover's tears fall into the food and it miraculously cures him."
    "Grateful" has been issued as a children's book, called "Grateful, A Song of Giving Thanks" created with Julie Andrews and her daughter Emma Walton Hamilton, published by HarperCollins. The book includes a recording of the song sung by Art Garfunkel.
  - One section of Urban Myths, one legend, was "Lavender Girl", which became part of the following production.
- The one-act musical Lavender Girl (2000), originally part of Urban Myths, is the story of a Princeton student, out looking for a conquest in a "night of reckless pre-college abandon," who falls in love with the mysterious title character when he almost runs her down with his car. It is set during the Jazz Age, in 1927 Alabama, because, Bucchino says, "I thought it would be fun to write a Charleston—we have a big Charleston number at a party in the show. [The Charleston is "We've Got Time".] And I wanted to write the sort of romantic, melodic songs that were written in the '20s, like classic Irving Berlin songs, or Jerome Kern. It's just a really colorful, beautiful world."

Lavender Girl was presented in 2000 as one of three one-act works produced, under the title 3hree, by Hal Prince at the Prince Music Theater.
A song from Lavender Girl, "Dancing", is included in Songs of John Bucchino (above).

- The DreamWorks animated film Joseph: King of Dreams (2000). Released on DVD; no soundtrack CD.
  The song "Better Than I" is included in The Songs of John Bucchino.
- Bucchino made his Broadway debut as composer/lyricist of A Catered Affair (2008), featuring four-time Tony Award-winner Harvey Fierstein as bookwriter and co-star. Fierstein sought out Bucchino, whose "songs had become something of a hot property in New York's cabaret scene". A Catered Affair concerns a working-class family in the Bronx in 1953; there is family conflict over the cost of a huge banquet for the eldest daughter's wedding. After a try-out in San Diego, it opened on Broadway on April 17, 2008, and closed July 27, 2008; there were 116 regular performances and 27 previews. It won the Drama League Award for Distinguished Production of a Musical. The show has received subsequent productions by Chicago's Porchlight Music Theatre, the Atlanta-area Aurora Theatre, the Hattiesburg Civic Light Opera, a community production in Helena, Montana, and the Royal Academy of Music in London.
- Esaura, 2013. In Denmark. "The musical is based on local Danish history, more precisely on a Danish novel by Carl E. Simonsen called Abraham Fournais. It takes place around the siege of the town of Fredericia in 1849." "It tells the story of two young lovers divided by war and religion and their parents' past set in the time of the siege of Fredericia in 1849. Bucchino's description: "an enormously emotionally powerful and completely universal love story against the backdrop of war that anyone can relate to." The first Danish musical. In English. Music and lyrics by Bucchino. Bucchino was recommended to the producers by Steven Schwartz.

=== Concerts of John Bucchino songs ===
- It's Only Life is a revue of his songs, presented at Lincoln Center under the direction of Daisy Prince on January 27, 2006.

== Recordings ==
=== Songs of John Bucchino ===
Listed here are recordings consisting completely of Bucchino songs.

- David Campbell Sings John Bucchino (2014). Reached #1 on the Australian jazz chart.
- Esaura (2013) (not for sale in U.S.)
- A Catered Affair (2008) (original cast recording)
- It's Only Life (2006). Tracks and singers: "The Artist at 40" (All), "Unexpressed" (Gavin Creel), "Painting My Kitchen" (Brooks Ashmanskas), "Sweet Dreams" (Jessica Molaskey), "Playbill" (Billy Porter), "That Smile" (All), "Love Quiz" (Andréa Burns) "A Contact High" (Gavin Creel), "What You Need" (Billy Porter), "When You're Here" (Jessica Molaskey), "It Feels Like Home" (Gavin Creel). "A Powerful Man" (Billy Porter), "I'm Not Waiting" (All), "Progression" (piano only, John Bucchino), "It's Only Life" (All), "Love Will Find You in Its Time" (Andréa Burns & Gavin Creel), "If I Ever Say I'm Over You (Brooks Ashmanskas), "This Moment' (Andréa Burns), "On My Bedside Table" (Brooks Ashmanskas), "I've Learned to Let Things Go" (Jessica Molaskey), "Taking the Wheel" (Gavin Creel & All), "Grateful" (Billy Porter), "A Glimpse of the Weave" (All). John Bucchino accompanies on the piano. Sheet music of the songs not already published in the Grateful collection has been published as a book.ISBN 9781423457084
- Grateful, A Song of Giving Thanks (children's book). Art Garfunkel sings the song on an accompanying CD. ISBN 006051633X.
- 3hree (2001) (original cast recording)
- Solitude Lessons (cassette, 2000). Recorded a decade before it was released, "it was originally intended for use as a demo tape and to sell after the concerts in which he played for singer Holly Near."
- Grateful. The Songs of John Bucchino (2000). Bucchino is accompanist of all songs. "Grateful" (Michael Feinstein), "Sweet Dreams" (Judy Collins), "That Smile" (Liza Minnelli and Billy Strich), "It Feels Like Home" (Daisy Prince), "Powerful man" (Jimmy Webb), "Unexpressed" (Adam Guettel), "Temporary" (Lois Sage), "Dancing" (Patti Lupone), "If I ever say I'm over you" (Art Garfunkel), "Sepia life" (Andrea Marcovicci), "The Song with the violins" (Amanda McBroom), "In a restaurant by the sea" (Ann Hampton Callaway), "Not a cloud in the sky" (John Bucchino), "Taking the wheel" (Brian Lane Green), "Better than I" (David Campbell), "This moment" (Kristin Chenoweth).
- Joseph, King of Dreams (DVD). All songs, but not score, by Bucchino.
- On the Arrow (cassette tape, 1985). Contents: "You're so blasé", "What you're lookin' for", "On the arrow", "That smile", "Come home alone again", "The time and the wine", "Running red lights to you", "It feels like home", "A contact high", "Living in the belly of a dinosaur", "Never catching up, never giving up", "I will not be left behind". Bucchino sings and plays. Sheet music of the songs has been published as a book, ISBN 0634020005
- "Something as Simple" (45 rpm single, 1981). Bucchino sings and plays.

In addition to the performers on the above recordings, the following have performed and/or recorded at least one John Bucchino song: Michael Callen, The Flirtations, Audra McDonald, Brian Stokes Mitchell, the Mormon Tabernacle Choir, the Boston Gay Men's Chorus, the Turtle Creek Chorale, the Boston Pops, and a long list of others. Venues have included Carnegie Hall, the Metropolitan Opera House, the Hollywood Bowl, the Kennedy Center, the Sydney Opera House, London's O2 Arena, and the White House.

=== John Bucchino as solo pianist ===
- Beatles Reimagined (CD, 2016). Solo piano improvisations.
- On Richard Rodgers' Piano (2003). Bucchino plays piano interpretations of Rodgers' songs on Rodgers' own Steinway. Voted Best Instrumental CD by Show Business Weekly.

=== John Bucchino as accompanist ===
This list is limited to albums on which Bucchino is the only accompanist.

- Holly Near, Peace Becomes You (2012)
- Holly Near, Show Up (2006)
- Cris Williamson and Holly Near, Cris & Holly (2003)
- Art Garfunkel, Grateful : a song of giving thanks (2003) (juvenile)
- Holly Near, With a Song in My Heart (1997)
- Holly Near and Ronnie Gilbert, This Train Still Runs (CD, 1996)
- Holly Near, Musical highlights from the play Fire in the rain (cassette and CD, 1993)
- Romanovsky & Phillips, Be Political, Not Polite (1991)
- Holly Near, Sky Dances (cassette, LP, and CD, 1990)
- Ronnie Gilbert, Love Will Find a Way (CD, 1989)
- Marcia Berman sings lullabies and songs you never dreamed were lullabies (1989) (juvenile)
- Elliot Pilshaw, Feels like home (cassette, 1986)
- Marcia Berman sings Malvina Reynolds' Rabbits dance : and other songs for children (cassette and LP, 1985) (juvenile)
- Ruth Buell, Take a Little Step (cassette, 1983; CD, 2011?) (juvenile)
- Marcia Berman and Anne Lief Barlin, Dance-a-Story, Sing-a-Song (cassette and LP, 1980) (juvenile)
- Patty Zeitlin; Marcia Berman; Anne Lief Barlin Rainy day dances, rainy day songs (cassette and LP, 1975, CD, 2003) (juvenile)

== Other projects ==
In 1993, Bucchino served as musical director of Holly Near: Fire in the Rain. He wrote the songs (music and lyrics) for the DreamWorks picture, Joseph: King of Dreams (2000), produced and orchestrated by Daniel Pelfrey. The film won a Film Advisory Board Award of Excellence and Bucchino's Better Than I won the 2001 Video Premiere Award for Best Song at the DVD Exclusive Awards. Bucchino wrote the lyrics for the children's musical adaptation of Simeon's Gift, a book by Julie Andrews and Emma Walton Hamilton. The work, with a score by Ian Fraser, was performed by the Louisville Orchestra in 2008 conducted by Fraser, with costumed vocalists and Ms. Andrews as "storyteller." As part of their Julie Andrews Collection, HarperCollins published a children's book titled Grateful, A Song of Giving Thanks (based on Bucchino's song/album Grateful), which was awarded the Parents' Choice Gold Award. In 2010, Bucchino was commissioned by Danish producer Søren Møller to compose the music and lyrics for the musical Esaura, with a book by Mads Æbeløe Nielsen.

In January 2016, Bucchino's It’s Only Life premiered in Paris, France, performed in concert version by American Musical Theatre Live in the presence of the composer.

== Awards and recognition ==
Year	Award	Notes
1995?	"Out Song" award, from the Gay and Lesbian American Music Awards (GLAMA)	For the song "Do Not Turn Away", from Winter Song.
1997	Johnny Mercer Songwriter Award	
1998	Songwriters' Fellowship Award	
1998	ASCAP Foundation Richard Rodgers New Horizons Award	
2000	Second Stage Constance Klinsky Award	
2000	Gilman & Gonzalez-Falla Commendation Award	
2001	Jonathan Larson Performing Arts Foundation	
2001	Kleban Awards	
2005	Fred Ebb Award for aspiring musical-theater songwriters	Had 391 applicants and carried a prize of $50,000.
2008	Drama Desk Award Nominee for Outstanding Lyrics	A Catered Affair [nominee]
2008	Drama Desk Award Nominee for Outstanding Music	A Catered Affair [nominee]
2010?	Group award, from the Gay and Lesbian American Music Awards (GLAMA)	Shared award with Michael Callin, Holly Near, Cris Williamson, and Arnold McCuller, for the song "They Are Falling All Around Me," from the album Legacy.

== Master classes ==
Bucchino has given master classes in performance of his songs at numerous universities and conservatories in the U.S. and abroad, including DeSales University, Yale University, Cincinnati College-Conservatory of Music, Indiana University, Carnegie Mellon University, London's Royal Academy of Music, the Danish Musical Theatre Academy in Fredericia, Denmark, NASDA (National Academy of Singing and Dramatic Arts) in Christchurch, New Zealand, WAAPA (Western Australia Academy of Performing Arts) in Perth, Australia, the Victoria College of the Arts in Melbourne, Australia, the Queensland Conservatorium of Music (Musical Theatre) in Brisbane, Australia, and the Australian Institute of Music in Sydney, Australia. In January 2016, he gave a master class in France with the Paris-based American Musical Theatre Live.
