= 7th Helpmann Awards =

Australian live performance awards held in 2007

- Date: 6 August 2007
- Location: Capitol Theatre, Sydney
- Hosted by: Jonathan Biggins

Television/radio coverage
- Network: Bio

The 7th Annual Helpmann Awards for live performance in Australia were held on 6 August 2007 at the Capitol Theatre in Sydney.

== Winners and nominees ==
In the following tables, winners are listed first and highlighted in boldface. The nominees are listed below the winner and not in boldface.

=== Theatre ===
Best Play	Best Direction of a Play
**The Lost Echo – Sydney Theatre Company**; Holding the Man – Griffin Theatre Company; Parramatta Girls – Company B; The Season at Sarsaparilla – Sydney Theatre Company	**Barrie Kosky – The Lost Echo**; Benedict Andrews – The Season at Sarsaparilla; Wesley Enoch – Parramatta Girls; Michael Hill – Waiting for Godot (State Theatre Company of South Australia)
Best Female Actor in a Play	Best Male Actor in a Play
**Ursula Yovich – Capricornia (Company B)**; Elena Kalinina – Uncle Vanya (Sydney Festival); Pamela Rabe – Mother Courage and Her Children (Sydney Theatre Company); Alison van Reeken – The Carnivores (Black Swan Theatre Company)	**Jefferson Mays – I Am My Own Wife (Melbourne Theatre Company, Sydney Theatre Company and Hothouse Theatre)**; Peter Carroll – The Season at Sarsaparilla; John Gaden – The Lost Echo; Cameron Goodall – Hamlet (State Theatre Company of South Australia and Queensland Theatre Company)
Best Female Actor in a Supporting Role in a Play	Best Male Actor in a Supporting Role in a Play
**Deborah Mailman – The Lost Echo**; Hayley McElhinney – Mother Courage and Her Children; Rebecca Massey – It Just Stopped (Company B and Malthouse Theatre); Bojana Novakovic – Eldorado (Malthouse Theatre)	**Paul Capsis – The Lost Echo**; Matthew Newton – The History Boys (Melbourne Theatre Company); Sean Taylor – Uncle Vanya (State Theatre Company of South Australia); Dan Wyllie – The Pillowman (Melbourne Theatre Company)

=== Musicals ===
Best Musical
**Keating! – Company B**; Hedwig and the Angry Inch – Showtune Productions; Miss Saigon – Michael Coppel, Louise Withers and Linda Bewick; Priscilla Queen of the Desert the Musical – Liz Koops and Garry McQuinn for Back Row Productions, Alan Scott, Michael Chugg for Chugg Entertainment, Michael Hamlyn for Specific Films and John Frost
Best Direction of a Musical	Best Choreography in a Musical
**Neil Armfield – Keating!**; Laurence Connor – Miss Saigon; Craig Ilott – Hedwig and the Angry Inch; Simon Phillips – Priscilla Queen of the Desert the Musical	**Kelley Abbey & Kenny Ortega – The Boy from Oz (BFO Arena)**; Ross Coleman – Pippin (Peter Cousens' Kookaburra: The National Musical Theatre Company); Ross Coleman – Priscilla Queen of the Desert the Musical; Geoffrey Garratt & Bob Avian – Miss Saigon
Best Female Actor in a Musical	Best Male Actor in a Musical
**Laurie Cadevida – Miss Saigon**; Chrissy Amphlett – The Boy from Oz; Sharon Millerchip – Pippin; Silvie Paladino – Sideshow Alley (McPherson Ink)	**iOTA – Hedwig and the Angry Inch**; David Harris – Miss Saigon; Hugh Jackman – The Boy from Oz; Tony Sheldon – Priscilla Queen of the Desert the Musical
Best Female Actor in a Supporting Role in a Musical	Best Male Actor in a Supporting Role in a Musical
**Colleen Hewett – The Boy from Oz**; Robyn Arthur – Sideshow Alley; Genevieve Lemon – Priscilla Queen of the Desert the Musical; Trisha Noble – Pippin	**Terry Serio – Keating!**; Juan Jackson – Miss Saigon; RJ Rosales – Miss Saigon; Michael Caton – Priscilla Queen of the Desert the Musical

=== Opera and Classical Music ===
Best Opera	Best Direction of an Opera
**Rusalka – Opera Australia**; Alcina – Opera Australia; The Love of the Nightingale – West Australian Opera, Perth International Arts Festival, Victorian Opera, Opera Queensland, Queendsland Music Festival and Queensland Performing Arts Centre; Satyagraha – State Opera of South Australia, Leigh Warren & Dancers, The Adelaide Vocal Project	**Douglas Horton – The Hive (ChamberMade)**; Olivia Fuchs – Rusalka; Lindy Hume – The Love of the Nightingale; Leigh Warren – Satyagraha
Best Female Performer in an Opera	Best Male Performer in an Opera
**Emma Matthews – The Love of the Nightingale**; Cheryl Barker – Rusalka; Susan Bullock – Tristan und Isolde (West Australian Opera); Elvira Fatykhova – La traviata (Opera Australia)	**Jonathan Summers – Rigoletto (Opera Australia)**; Tobias Cole – Julius Caesar (Opera Australia); Julian Gavin – Rusalka; Adam Goodburn – Satyagraha
Best Female Performer in a Supporting Role in an Opera	Best Male Performer in a Supporting Role in an Opera
**Orla Boylan – The Love of the Nightingale**; Bernadette Cullen – Tristan und Isolde; Taryn Fiebig – La clemenza di Tito (Opera Australia); Pamela Helen Stephen – Julius Caesar	**James Egglestone – The Love of the Nightingale**; Christopher Field – Julius Caesar; Harry Peeters – Tristan und Isolde
Best Classical Concert Presentation	Best Performance in a Classical Concert
**Revolution – Australian Chamber Orchestra**; Ashkenazy conducts Rachmaninov – Sydney Symphony; Rossini Gala – Sydney Symphony; Mozart Symphony No 36 KV425, Tchaikovsky Symphony No. 5 – Vienna Philharmonic presented by Sydney Opera House	**Melbourne Symphony Orchestra – Master Series - Courage under fire Shostakovich Symphony No 7 Leningrad (Melbourne Symphony Orchestra)**; Robert Adam – Carmina Burana/Chichester Psalms/Knoxville Concert (Opera Australia); Vadim Repin – Vadin Repin plays Sibelius (West Australian Symphony Orchestra); Terry Riley – 2006 Alfred Hook Lecture and Recital by Terry Riley as part of the Aurora Festival (Aurora New Music)

=== Dance and Physical Theatre ===
Best Ballet or Dance Work	Best Visual or Physical Theatre Production
**Structure & Sadness – Lucy Guerin Company**; Lawn – Brisbane Powerhouse; Monumental – Melbourne International Arts Festival and Ros Warby; zero degrees – Les Ballets C. De La B. and Akram Khan Company presented by Sydney Festival	**Honour Bound – Sydney Opera House and Malthouse Theatre**; The 7 Fingers – The Arts Centre; La Clique – Spiegletent International presented by Sydney Festival and the Victorian Arts Centre; The Space Between – Circa presented by Sydney Festival
Best Choreography in a Dance or Physical Theatre Work
**Akram Khan and Sidi Larbi Cherkaoui – zero degrees**; Lucy Guerin – Structure & Sadness; Michael Kantor, Gideon Obarzanek & Lucy Guerin – Tense Dave (Malthouse Theatre); Splintergroup – Lawn
Best Female Dancer in a Dance or Physical Theatre Work	Best Male Dancer in a Dance or Physical Theatre Work
**Ros Warby – Monumental**; Lucinda Dunn – Don Quixote (The Australian Ballet); Michelle Heaven – Tense Dave; Kirstie McCracken – Structure & Sadness	**Akram Khan – zero degrees**; Bradley Chatfield – CUT (Sydney Dance Company); Byron Perry – Headlock (Malthouse Theatre); Byron Perry – Structure & Sadness

=== Contemporary Music ===
Best Australian Contemporary Concert	Best Performance in an Australian Contemporary Concert
**Murundak – Melbourne International Arts Festival and Arts House**; The Countdown Spectacular – The Frontier Touring Company & Michael Gudinski; Damien Leith "The Winner's Journey - Live" – The Harbour Agency; David Campbell "Wild With Style" – newtheatricals, Sydney Opera House and Lunchbox Theatrical Productions	**David Campbell – Wild With Style**; Damien Leith – The Winner's Journey - Live; Kylie Minogue – Showgirl Homecoming Tour (The Frontier Touring Company); Olivia Newton-John – Olivia Newton-John with the Sydney Symphony (Sydney Symphony)
Best Contemporary Music Festival	Best International Contemporary Music Concert
**The 18th East Coast Blues and Roots Music Festival – Peter Noble, Chugg Entertainment, Definitive Events**; WOMADelaide – WOMADelaide Foundation; St Jeromes Laneway Festival – Rockin Roll Circus & Chugg Entertainment; Big Day Out Festival 2007 – Vivian Lees and Ken West, Creative Festival Entertainment	**Pink - I'm Not Dead! Tour – Michael Coppel**; Chick Corea and Gary Burton with the Sydney Symphony – Sydney Symphony; Lou Reed's Berlin – Arts at St. Ann's and Sydney Festival; Robbie Williams: Close Encounters Tour – Chugg Entertainment

=== Other ===
Best Special Event	Best Comedy Performer
**Billy Crystal – 700 Sundays – DCE, Janice Crystal, Larry Magid and Face Productions**; Gate Theatre Beckett Season – Gate Theatre Dublin presented by Sydney Festival; Operatunity Oz performance of "Rigoleto" – Opera Australia; Walking with Dinosaurs - the Live Experience – WW T-Rex	**Adam Hills – Joymonger (Token Events)**; Tom Gleeson – Tom On! (A-List Entertainment); Fiona O'Loughlin – Fiona O'Loughlin (Andrew Tayor Management); Akmal Saleh – Akmal Live! (A-List Entertainment)
Best Presentation for Children	Best Regional Touring Production
**Jackie French's Hitler's Daughter – Monkey Baa Theatre for Young People**; The Adventures of Snugglepot & Cuddlepie and Little Ragged Blossom – Windmill Performing Arts and Company B in association with Sydney Festival, Perth International Arts Festival & Adelaide Festival Centre; Emily Loves to Bounce! – Patch Theatre Company; The Fairies Live On Stage – Andrew Kay & Associates, GGA & ABC	**Six Dance Lessons in Six Weeks – Ensemble Productions in association with Christine Dunstan Productions**; Clan – Bangarra Dance Theatre; Cosentino "Evolution" – Cosentino Entertainment; The Messiah – HotHouse Theatre

=== Industry ===
Best New Australian Work
**Barrie Kosky and Tom Wright – The Lost Echo**; Stephan Elliott and Allan Scott – Priscilla, Queen of the Desert; Nigel Jamieson – Honour Bound; Alan John and John Clarke with Doug MacLeod – The Adventures of Snugglepot & Cuddlepie and Little Ragged Blossom; Lucy Guerin – Structure & Sadness; Richard Mills and Timberlake Wertenbaker – The Love of the Nightingale
Best Original Score	Best Music Direction
**Paul Keelan & Gary Young – Sideshow Alley**; James Brett – Walking with Dinosaurs - the Live Experience; Alan John – Mother Courage and Her Children; Richard Mills – The Love of the Nightingale	**Richard Mills – The Love of the Nightingale**; Casey Bennetto – Keating!; Stephen 'Spud' Murphy – Priscilla Queen of the Desert the Musical; Guy Simpson – Miss Saigon
Best Scenic Design	Best Costume Design
**Brian Thomson – The Boy from Oz**; Robert Cousins – The Season at Sarsaparilla; Dan Potra – The Love of the Nightingale; Richard Roberts – Raymonda (The Australian Ballet)	**Tim Chappel & Lizzie Gardiner – Priscilla Queen of the Desert the Musical**; Anna French – Raymonda; Roger Kirk – The Pirates of Penzance (Opera Australia); Tess Schofield – The Adventures of Snugglepot & Cuddlepie and Little Ragged Blossom
Best Lighting Design	Best Sound Design
**Al Gurdon – Robbie Williams: Close Encounters Tour**; Jon Buswell – Raymonda; Bruno Poet – Rusalka; John Rayment – Walking with Dinosaurs - the Live Experience	**Michael Waters – The Woman in Black (Lunchbox Theatrical Productions, Singapore Repertory Theatre and newtheatricals)**; Steve Francis – Keating!; Peter Grubb for System Sound – Miss Saigon; Michael Waters – The Boy from Oz

=== Lifetime Achievement ===
JC Williamson Award
- **Professor Barry Tuckwell AC OBE**
- **Dame Margaret Scott AC DBE**
