= 8th Helpmann Awards =

Australian live performance awards held in 2008

- Date: 28 July 2008
- Location: Lyric Theatre, Sydney
- Hosted by: Jonathan Biggins and Julia Zemiro

Television/radio coverage
- Network: Bio.

The 2008 Helpmann Awards were presented on 28 July 2008 at the Lyric Theatre, Sydney. The ceremony was hosted by Jonathan Biggins and Julia Zemiro and was broadcast live on Bio. (Foxtel's biography channel).

== Nominees ==
(winners are bolded)

=== Theatre ===
| Best Play | Best Direction of a Play |
|---|---|
| **Who's Afraid of Virginia Woolf? – Company B**; Black Watch – National Theatre of Scotland presented by Sydney Festival, Perth International Arts Festival; When the Rain Stops Falling – Brink Productions; Toy Symphony – Company B | **Neil Armfield – Toy Symphony**; Benedict Andrews – Who's Afraid of Virginia Woolf?; Barrie Kosky – The Tell-Tale Heart (Malthouse Theatre and Melbourne International Arts Festival); John Tiffany – Black Watch |
| Best Female Actor in a Play | Best Male Actor in a Play |
| **Leah Purcell – The Story of the Miracles at Cookie's Table (Griffin Theatre Company and HotHouse Theatre)**; Catherine McClements – Who's Afraid of Virginia Woolf?; Kate Dickie – Aalst (National Theatre of Scotland, presented by Sydney Festival, Perth International Arts Festival and Brisbane Powerhouse); Genevieve Picot – Rock 'n' Roll (Melbourne Theatre Company) | **Richard Roxburgh – Toy Symphony**; Marton Csokas – Who's Afraid of Virginia Woolf?; Martin Niedermair – The Tell-Tale Heart; Geoffrey Rush – Exit the King (Company B and Malthouse Theatre) |
| Best Female Actor in a Supporting Role in a Play | Best Male Actor in a Supporting Role in a Play |
| **Julie Forsyth – Exit the King**; Monica Maughan – Toy Symphony; Susan Prior – Riflemind (Sydney Theatre Company); Alison Whyte – Don's Party (Melbourne Theatre Company and Sydney Theatre Company) | **Russell Dykstra – Toy Symphony**; Travis McMahon – Don's Party (Melbourne Theatre Company and Sydney Theatre Company); James Stewart – The Glass Menagerie (Queensland Theatre Company); David Woods – Exit the King |

=== Musicals ===
Best Musical
**Billy Elliot the Musical – Universal Pictures, Working Title Films and Old Vic Productions**; Guys and Dolls – Ambassador Theatre Group, Shows Inc, Marriner Theatres and Tulchin/Bartner Productions; Company – Kookaburra: The National Musical Theatre Company; The Phantom of the Opera – The Really Useful Group Asia Pacific and The Gordon/Frost Organisation
| Best Direction of a Musical | Best Choreography in a Musical |
| **Stephen Daldry in association with Julian Webber – Billy Elliot the Musical**; Gale Edwards – Company; Michael Grandage & Jamie Lloyd – Guys and Dolls; Roger Hodgman – Little Me (The Production Company) | **Peter Darling – Billy Elliot the Musical**; Rob Ashford – Guys and Dolls; Ross Coleman – Sweet Charity (The Production Company); Ross Coleman – Shout! The Legend of The Wild One (Dennis Smith & John Gilbert) |
| Best Female Actor in a Musical | Best Male Actor in a Musical |
| **Genevieve Lemon – Billy Elliot the Musical**; Marina Prior – Guys and Dolls; Ana Marina – The Phantom of the Opera; Sharon Millerchip – Sweet Charity | **Lochlan Denholm, Nick Twiney, Rarmian Newton and Rhys Kosakowski – Billy Elliot the Musical**; iOTA – Richard O'Brien's Rocky Horror Show; Mitchell Butel – Little Me; Anthony Warlow – The Phantom of the Opera |
| Best Female Actor in a Supporting Role in a Musical | Best Male Actor in a Supporting Role in a Musical |
| **Sharon Millerchip – Richard O'Brien's Rocky Horror Show**; Lola Nixon – Billy Elliot the Musical; Colette Mann – Priscilla Queen of the Desert the Musical; Jackie Rees – The Phantom of the Opera | **Shane Jacobson – Guys and Dolls**; Linal Haft – Billy Elliot the Musical; Bill Hunter – Priscilla Queen of the Desert – The Musical; John Paul Young – Shout! The Legend of The Wild One |

=== Opera and Classical Music ===
| Best Opera | Best Direction of an Opera |
|---|---|
| **Arabella – Opera Australia**; Les Contes d'Hoffmann – Opera Australia; Dead Man Walking – Andrew McManus Presents and Alexander Productions; Little Women – State Opera of South Australia and State Theatre Company of SA | **John Cox – Arabella**; Bruce Beresford – A Streetcar Named Desire; Nigel Jamieson – Dead Man Walking; Adam Cook – Little Women |
| Best Female Performer in an Opera | Best Male Performer in an Opera |
| **Cheryl Barker – Arabella**; Emma Matthews – Les Contes d'Hoffmann; Kirsti Harms – Dead Man Walking; Elvira Fatykhova – Rigoletto | **Teddy Tahu Rhodes – Dead Man Walking**; John Wegner – Les Contes d'Hoffmann; Peter Coleman-Wright – Arabella; Jonathan Summers – Il trittico |
| Best Female Performer in a Supporting Role in an Opera | Best Male Performer in a Supporting Role in an Opera |
| **Emma Matthews – Arabella**; Antoinette Halloran – A Streetcar Named Desire; Hye Seoung Kwon – Carmen; Anke Hoppner – The Love of the Nightingale | **James Egglestone – Little Women**; Luke Gabbedy – La bohème; Kanen Breen – Les Contes d'Hoffmann; Stuart Skelton – A Streetcar Named Desire |
| Best Classical Concert Presentation | Best Performance in a Classical Concert |
| **West Australian Opera – Opera in the Park – Madama Butterfly**; Australian Brandenburg Orchestra with L'Arpeggiata – Baroque Beat; Sydney Symphony – Sir Charles Mackerras concerts; Adelaide Symphony Orchestra – Sibelius Festival | **Melbourne Symphony Orchestra – Classical Connections – Sir Charles Returns**; Simone Young – Turangalîla-Symphonie; Michael Kieran Harvey – Messiaen's Catalogue d'oiseaux; Aivale Cole – Opera in the Park – Madama Butterfly |

=== Dance and Physical Theatre ===
| Best Ballet or Dance Work | Best Visual or Physical Theatre Production |
|---|---|
| **Glow – Chunky Move & Melbourne International Arts Festival**; The Nutcracker – The Australian Ballet; Sacred Monsters – Akram Khan Co. presented by Adelaide Festival of Arts, Sydney Opera House, Brisbane Powerhouse; Roadkill – Brisbane Powerhouse and Dancenorth choreographed by Splintergroup | **Mortal Engine – Chunky Move presented by Sydney Festival**; Au Revoir Parapluie – Sydney Festival; Paradise City – Branch Nebula produced by Performing Lines; Secret – Cirque Ici presented by Sydney Festival |
| Best Female Dancer in a Dance or Physical Theatre Work | Best Male Dancer in a Dance or Physical Theatre Work |
| **Sara Black – Glow**; Sarah-Jayne Howard – Roadkill; Larissa McGowan – G (Australian Dance Theatre, Theatre de la Ville, Joyce Theatre, Southbank Centre, Merrigong Theatre); Lucinda Dunn – Don Quixote (The Australian Ballet) | **Paul White – Construct (Sydney Festival)**; Akram Khan – Sacred Monsters; Steven Heathcote – After the Rain (The Australian Ballet); Gavin Webber – Roadkill |
Best Choreography in a Dance or Physical Theatre Work
**Tanja Liedtke – Construct**; Christopher Wheeldon – After the Rain; Gideon Obarzanek – Glow; Lloyd Newson – To Be Straight With You (DV8 Physical Theatre presented by Adelaide Festival of Arts)

=== Contemporary Music ===
| Best Australian Contemporary Concert | Best Contemporary Music Festival |
|---|---|
| **The Frontier Touring Company – Crowded House**; Maiden Australia and QPAC – Broad; Andrew McManus Presents – Kate Ceberano – Nine Lime Avenue Tour; Sydney Symphony – The Whitlams with the Sydney Symphony | **Womadelaide Foundation – Womadelaide**; Chugg Entertainment & Rockin Roll Circus – St Jeromes Laneway Festival; Chugg Entertainment & Peter Noble Presents – 19th Annual East Coast Blues and Roots Festival; Vivian Lees & Ken West – Big Day Out Festival 2008 |
| Best Performance in an Australian Contemporary Concert | Best International Contemporary Concert |
| **David Campbell – The Swing Sessions 2**; Guy Sebastian – The Memphis Tour; Kate Ceberano – Nine Lime Avenue Tour; Tina Arena in concert | **Sydney Festival – Björk on the Steps of the Sydney Opera House**; The Frontier Touring Company – Justin Timberlake; Dainty Consolidated Entertainment – Bon Jovi – Lost Highway Tour; Chugg Entertainment and Perth International Arts Festival – Rufus Wainwright |

=== Other ===
| Best Presentation for Children | Best Regional Touring Production |
|---|---|
| **Mr McGee and the Biting Flea – Patch Theatre Company**; My Grandma Lived in Gooligulch – Gooligulch Productions in association with Garry Ginivan Attractions; Hoods – Real T.V.; Cat – Windmill Performing Arts | **Keating! – Company B**; Mr McGee and the Biting Flea – Patch Theatre Company; True Stories – Bangarra Dance Theatre; Heroes – Queensland Theatre Company |
Best Comedy Performer
**David Collins & Shane Dundas – The Umbilical Brothers: Don't Explain**; Frank Woodley – Possessed; Julia Morris – Julia Morris in Shoosh Please!; Ross Noble

=== Industry ===
Best New Australian Work
**Michael Gow – Toy Symphony**; Andrew Bovell – When the Rain Stops Falling (Brink Productions co-presented by State Theatre Company of South Australia and Adelaide Festival of Arts); Gideon Obarzanek – Glow (Chunky Move presented by Melbourne International Arts Festival); Alana Valentine – Parramatta Girls (Company B)
| Best Original Score | Best Music Direction |
| **Barrie Kosky – The Tell-Tale Heart**; Richard Mills – Songlines for the Heart's Desire; Andree Greenwell – Venus & Adonis; Ben Frost – Mortal Engine | **Stephen Amos – Billy Elliot the Musical**; Peter Farnan – Sleeping Beauty; Lionel Friend – Arabella; Peter Casey – Company |
| Best Scenic Design | Best Costume Design |
| **Dan Potra – Dead Man Walking**; Peter McKintosh – The 39 Steps; John F Macfarlane – The Nutcracker; Ian MacNeil – Billy Elliot the Musical | **Julie Lynch – Richard O'Brien's Rocky Horror Show**; Robert Perdziola – Arabella; Stephen Curtis – The Government Inspector; John F Macfarlane – The Nutcracker |
| Best Lighting Design | Best Sound Design |
| **Rick Fisher – Billy Elliot the Musical**; Paul Jackson – Moving Target; Trudy Dalgleish – Dead Man Walking; Niklas Pajanti – When the Rain Stops Falling | **Gareth Fry – Black Watch**; Chris Full, John Scandrett & Nick Reich – Guys and Dolls; Paul Arditti – Billy Elliot the Musical; Mic Pool – The 39 Steps |
Best Special Event
**Sydney Opera House and Australian Broadcasting Corporation – The Choir of Hard Knocks**; Kookaburra: The National Musical Theatre Company – An Audience With Stephen Sondheim; Adelaide Festival of Arts & The Electric Canvas – Ignition! and Northern Lights; Queensland Music Festival and Brisbane City Council – Pig City
