= 10th Helpmann Awards =

2010 Australian live performance awards

- Date: 6 September 2010
- Location: Sydney Opera House
- Hosted by: David Campbell
- Website: http://www.helpmannawards.com.au/

Television/radio coverage
- Network: Studio

The 10th Annual Helpmann Awards for live performance in Australia were held on 6 September 2010 at the Sydney Opera House.

== Winners and nominees ==
In the following tables, winners are listed first and highlighted in boldface. The nominees are those which are listed below the winner and not in boldface.

=== Theatre ===
Best Play	Best Direction of a Play
**Richard III – Melbourne Theatre Company**; August: Osage County – Melbourne Theatre Company; The Book of Everything – Company B Belvoir & Kim Carpenter's Theatre of Image; Happy Days – Malthouse Theatre	**Simon Phillips – Richard III**; Neil Armfield – The Book of Everything; Michael Kantor – Happy Days; Thomas Ostermeier – Hamlet (Schaubuhne Berlin presented by Sydney Festival)
Best Female Actor in a Play	Best Male Actor in a Play
**Julie Forsyth – Happy Days**; Kathryn Hunter – Kafka's Monkey (Arts Projects Australia in association with Sydney Theatre Company and Malthouse Theatre); Jane Menelaus – August: Osage County; Robyn Nevin – August: Osage County	**Ewen Leslie – Richard III**; Paul Blackwell – The Hypochondriac (Brink Productions); Robert Menzies – The End (Company B Belvoir); Toby Schmitz – Ruben Guthrie (Company B Belvoir)
Best Female Actor in a Supporting Role in a Play	Best Male Actor in a Supporting Role in a Play
**Alison Whyte – Richard III**; Jennifer Hagan – Richard III; Deborah Kennedy – The Book of Everything; Yael Stone – The Book of Everything	**Humphrey Bower – Richard III**; Charlie Garber – Gethsemane (Company B Belvoir); Arky Michael – Love Me Tender (Company B Belvoir); Dennis Olsen – King Lear (State Theatre Company of South Australia)

=== Musicals ===
Best Musical
**Jersey Boys – Dodger Theatricals, Rodney Rigby, Dainty Consolidated Entertainment, Joseph J Grano, Tamara and Kevin Kinsella, Pelican Group & Michael Watt in association with Latitude Link & Rick Steiner**; Avenue Q – Arts Asia Pacific and Power Arts; The Drowsy Chaperone – Melbourne Theatre Company; The Wizard of Oz – Windmill Theatre
Best Direction of a Musical	Best Choreography in a Musical
**Jonathan Biggins – Avenue Q**; Des McAnuff – Jersey Boys; Rosemary Myers – The Wizard of Oz; Simon Phillips – The Drowsy Chaperone	**Kelley Abbey – Fame the Musical (John Frost)**; Andrew Hallsworth – The Drowsy Chaperone; Sergio Trujillo – Jersey Boys; Nathan M. Wright – Avenue Q
Best Female Actor in a Musical	Best Male Actor in a Musical
**Michala Banas – Avenue Q**; Delia Hannah – Cats (The Really Useful Company Asia Pacific in association with Lunchbox Theatrical Productions and David Atkins Enterprises); Christie Whelan – The Drowsy Chaperone; Ursula Yovich – The Wizard of Oz	**Mitchell Butel – Avenue Q**; Michael Cormick – Mamma Mia! (Judy Craymer, Richard East and Björn Ulvaeus for Littlestar in association with Universal and Michael Coppel with Louise Withers & Associates); Bobby Fox – Jersey Boys; Geoffrey Rush – The Drowsy Chaperone
Best Female Actor in a Supporting Role in a Musical	Best Male Actor in a Supporting Role in a Musical
**Christina O'Neil – Avenue Q**; Lisa Adam – Jersey Boys; Jaz Flowers – Fame the Musical; Jude Henshall – The Wizard of Oz	**Luke Joslin – Avenue Q**; Adam Murphy – The Drowsy Chaperone; Scott Johnson – Jersey Boys; Geoff Revell – The Wizard of Oz

=== Opera and classical music ===
Best Opera	Best Direction of an Opera
**Peter Grimes – Opera Australia**; Bliss – Opera Australia; Le Grand Macabre – Adelaide Festival in association with State Opera of South Australia; King Lear – Ten Days on the Island	**Neil Armfield – Peter Grimes**; Neil Armfield – Bliss; Chris Drummond – The Flying Dutchman (State Opera of South Australia); Alex Olle and Valentina Carrasco – Le Grand Macabre
Best Female Performer in an Opera	Best Male Performer in an Opera
**Emma Matthews – La sonnambula (Opera Australia)**; Takesha Meshé Kizart – Tosca (Opera Australia); Lorina Gore – Bliss; Susan Gritton – Peter Grimes	**Stuart Skelton – Peter Grimes**; Peter Coleman-Wright – Bliss; John Wegner – The Flying Dutchman; John Wegner – Tosca
Best Female Performer in a Supporting Role in an Opera	Best Male Performer in a Supporting Role in an Opera
**Taryn Fiebig – Bliss**; Catherine Carby – Peter Grimes; Taryn Fiebig – La sonnambula; Tiffany Speight – Così fan tutte (Opera Australia)	**Andrew Foote – Peter Grimes (West Australian Opera and Perth International Arts Festival in association with the Australian Youth Orchestra)**; Paul Biencourt – Rembrandt's Wife (Victorian Opera); Barry Ryan – Bliss; Stuart Skelton – The Flying Dutchman
Best Symphony Orchestra Concert	Best Chamber and Instrumental Ensemble Concert
**Oedipus Rex & Symphony of Psalms – Sydney Festival with the Sydney Symphony and the Sydney Philharmonia Choirs**; La Serenissima – Ten Days on the Island; Sydney Symphony Power and Panache – Sydney Symphony; Tchaikovsky's Symphony Pathetique – West Australian Symphony Orchestra	**Imogen Cooper in recital as part of the Sydney Symphony International Pianist in Recital Series – Sydney Symphony**; Great Romantics Tour – Australian Chamber Orchestra; Les Voix Humaines – Melbourne Recital Centre; London Sinfonietta – Programs 1 & 2 – Adelaide Festival
Best Individual Classical Performance
**Imogen Cooper – Imogen Cooper – Recital (Melbourne Recital Centre)**; Calvin Bowman – Bach Marathon (Melbourne International Arts Festival and City of Melbourne); Alexander Gavrylyuk – Prokofiev Piano Concerto No.3 with the Sydney Symphony (Sydney Symphony Prokofiev Festival) (Sydney Symphony); Philippe Jaroussky – Vivaldi Olympia (Australian Brandenburg Orchestra)

=== Dance and physical theatre ===
Best Ballet or Dance Work	Best Visual or Physical Theatre Production
**FIRE – Bangarra Dance Theatre**; Dyad 1929 – The Australian Ballet; Harakiri – a rite – STRUT dance; Körper – Melbourne International Arts Festival and Sasha Waltz	
Best Female Dancer in a Dance or Physical Theatre Work	Best Male Dancer in a Dance or Physical Theatre Work
**Danielle Rowe – Dyad 1929**; Deborah Brown – FIRE; Lucinda Dunn – The Silver Rose (The Australian Ballet); Tara Soh – Be Your Self (Australian Dance Theatre in association with the Adelaide Festival and Adelaide Festival Centre)	**Richard Cilli – We Unfold (Sydney Dance Company)**; Daniel Gaudiello – The Silver Rose; Matthew Morris – Harakiri – a rite; Kimball Wong – Be Your Self
Best Choreography in a Dance or Physical Theatre Production
**Stephen Page – FIRE**; Phillip Adams – Miracle (BalletLab); Didier Theron – Harakiri – a rite; Wayne McGregor – Dyad 1929

=== Contemporary music ===
Best Australian Contemporary Concert	Best Contemporary Music Festival
**The Man in Black: The Johnny Cash Story** **– Sydney Opera House in association with Folsom Prison Productions**; Dirty Three & Laughing Clowns – Sydney Festival by arrangement with ATP and Feel Presents a Don't Look Back concert; John Farnham – Live by Demand – Glenn Wheatley – Talentworks; The RocKwiz National Tour 2010 – Renegade Films and RocKwiz Touring	**Big Day Out 2010 – Vivian Lees and Ken West**; Homebake Music & Arts Festival 2009 – The 15th Anniversary – Domestic Music Concepts; 2010 Melbourne International Jazz Festival – Melbourne International Jazz Festival; WOMADelaide – WOMADelaide Foundation
Best International Contemporary Music Concert
**Pink – Funhouse Tour – Michael Coppel Presents**; AC/DC Black Ice Tour – Garry Van Egmond & Chugg Entertainment; Beyonce – Michael Coppel Presents; George Michael – Live – Dainty Consolidated Entertainment

=== Other ===
Best Cabaret Performer	Best Comedy Performer
**iOTA – Smoke & Mirrors (Sydney Festival)**; Paul Capsis, Martin Martini, Le Gateau Chocolat, Lady Carol, Christine Johnson, Simone Page Jones – A Company of Strangers (Strut n Fret); Moira Finucane – The Burlesque Hour (Finucane & Smith with fortyfivedownstairs, Auspicious Arts Projects and The Street Theatre); Meow Meow – Meow to the World: Crisis is Born (Again) (Sydney Opera House presents)	**Wil Anderson – Wilful Misconduct**; Kitty Flanagan – Charming and Alarming; Fiona O'Loughlin – On a Wing and A Prayer; Hannah Gadsby – The Cliff Young Shuffle
Best Presentation for Children	Best Regional Touring Production
**Sonya Hartnett's Thursday's Child – Monkey Baa Theatre for Young People**; The Book of Everything – Company B Belvoir & Kim Carpenter's Theatre of Image; Shape of a Girl – Sydney Opera House presents; The Wizard of Oz – Windmill Theatre	**True Stories – Bangarra Dance Theatre**; The Age I'm In – Force Majeure and Performing Lines; The Kursk – Critical Stages and Matrix Theatre; Letter's End – Spoon Tree Productions
Best Special Event
**Festival First Night – Sydney Festival**; A R Rahman – Sydney Festival; Dirtsong – Arts House and Melbourne International Arts Festival; La Fura dels Baus – Lotterywest Opening Celebration – Perth International Arts Festival

=== Industry ===
Best New Australian Work
**Craig Ilott & iOTA – Smoke & Mirrors (Sydney Festival and Spiegeltent International)**; The Black Arm Band with Steven Richardson and Alexis Wright – Dirtsong (Arts House and Melbourne International Arts Festival); BalletLab and Phillip Adams – Miracle (BalletLab); Brett Dean and Amanda Holden – Bliss
Best Original Score	Best Music Direction
**iOTA with Tina Harris, Joe Accaria, Chris Ball and Martin Hailey – Smoke & Mirrors**; Brett Dean – Bliss; Jeff Marx and Robert Lopez – Avenue Q; Taikoz – Pericles (Bell Shakespeare in association with Taikoz)	**Ron Melrose & Luke Hunter – Jersey Boys**; Mark Wigglesworth – Peter Grimes (Opera Australia); Nicolette Fraillon – Dyad 1929 (Steve Reich) (The Australian Ballet); Iain Grandage – Wunderschon (Perth International Arts Festival in association with the National Academy of Music)
Best Scenic Design	Best Costume Design
**Dale Ferguson – August: Osage County**; Roger Kirk – The Silver Rose (The Australian Ballet); Brian Thomson – Bliss; Klara Zieglerova & Michael Clark – Jersey Boys	**Gabriela Tylesova – Così fan tutte**; Dale Ferguson – The Drowsy Chaperone; Roger Kirk – The Silver Rose; Tess Schofield – Peter Grimes
Best Lighting Design	Best Sound Design
**Nigel Levings – Bliss**; Nick Schlieper – Richard III; Howell Binkley – Jersey Boys; Geoff Cobham – The Flying Dutchman	**Paul Charlier – A Streetcar Named Desire (Sydney Theatre Company)**; BalletLab and David Chisholm / Myles Mumford – Miracle; Steve Canyon Kennedy – Jersey Boys; Bob Scott – Bliss

=== Special awards ===
JC Williamson Award	Sue Nattrass Award
**Tony Gould AN D UNIV**; **Brian Nebenzahl OAM RFD**	
