= Helpmann Award for Best Visual or Physical Theatre Production =

Annual Australian theatre award

- Country: Australia
- Presented by: Live Performance Australia
- First award: 2001
- Currently held by: The Paper Architect, Davy and Kristin McGuire and Perth International Arts Festival (2015)
- Website: www.helpmannawards.com.au

The Helpmann Award for Best Visual or Physical Theatre Production is a theatre award presented by Live Performance Australia at the annual Helpmann Awards since 2001. The Helpmann Awards are Australia's national awards for live performance.

The award typically covers productions of physical theatre, circus, puppetry and other visual theatre.

== Winners and nominees ==
Winners are listed first and marked in a separate colour, in boldface.

Year	Title	Production company(ies)
**2001** (1st)
**2001** (1st)	**Slava’s Snowshow**	**Back Row Productions (UK) and International Management Group**
**2001** (1st)	Pom Pom	Patch Company
**2001** (1st)	Circus Oz	Circus Oz
**2001** (1st)	The Hobbit	Malcolm C. Cooke & Associates and Ztudio Pty Ltd
**2002** (2nd)
**2002** (2nd)	**Same, Same But Different**	**Performing Lines in association with Sydney Festival**
**2002** (2nd)	Circus Oz Sydney Season	Circus Oz
**2002** (2nd)	Puppetry of the Penis	Ross Mollison Productions
**2002** (2nd)	Stringraphy Ensemble	Melbourne Festival in association with Victorian Arts Centre
**2003** (3rd)
**2003** (3rd)	**Twinkle Twinkle Little Fish**	**Windmill Performing Arts**
**2003** (3rd)	Circus Oz 2003 Season	Circus Oz
**2003** (3rd)	Still Angela	Playbox Theatre
**2003** (3rd)	Macbeth: As Told by the Weird Sisters	Zen Zen Zo
**2004** (4th)
**2004** (4th)	**acrobat**	**Melbourne International Festival**
**2004** (4th)	Eora Crossing	Sydney Festival, Legs on the Wall, Museum of Sydney
**2004** (4th)	H2O - a fantastical voyage	Spare Parts Puppet Theatre
**2005** (5th)
**2005** (5th)	**Compagnie Philippe Genty Vanishing Point**	**Arts Projects Australia**
**2005** (5th)	The Lazy Kings	Sydney Festival
**2005** (5th)	Provenance	Melbourne International Arts Festival and Ronnie Burkett Theatre of Marionettes
**2005** (5th)	The Red Tree	Queensland Performing Arts Centre's Out of the Box Festival of Early Childhood Learning
**2006** (6th)
**2006** (6th)	**On the Case**	**Legs on the Wall**
**2006** (6th)	Bright Abyss	La Compagnie du Hanneton presented by Sydney Festival
**2006** (6th)	PreTender	Buzz Dance Theatre
**2007** (7th)
**2007** (7th)	**Honour Bound**	**Sydney Opera House**
**2007** (7th)	The 7 Fingers	The Arts Centre
**2007** (7th)	La Clique	Spiegletent International presented by Sydney Festival and the Victorian Arts Centre
**2007** (7th)	The Space Between	Circa presented by Sydney Festival
**2008** (8th)
**2008** (8th)	**Mortal Engine**	**Chunky Move presented by Sydney Festival**
**2008** (8th)	Au Revoir Parapluie	Presented by Sydney Festival
**2008** (8th)	Paradise City	Branch Nebula produced by Performing Lines
**2008** (8th)	Secret	Cirque Ici presented by Sydney Festival
**2009** (9th)
**2009** (9th)	**Compagnie Philippe Genty - Lands End**	**Arts Projects Australia**
**2009** (9th)	30th Birthday Bash	Circus Oz
**2009** (9th)	At First Sight	National Institute of Circus Arts (NICA)
**2009** (9th)	Cinderella On Ice	Lunchbox Theatrical Productions, Tony Mercer, David Atkins Enterprises and Vladislav Olenin
**2010** (10th)
**2010** (10th)	**This Kind of Ruckus**	**version 1.0 inc**
**2010** (10th)	Africa	Malthouse Theatre and My Darling Patricia
**2010** (10th)	Metamorphosis	Ten Days on the Island
**2010** (10th)	Traces	Arts Projects Australia
**2011** (11th)
**2011** (11th)	**Not In A Million Years**	**Force Majeure**
**2011** (11th)	Propaganda	HotHouse Theatre and Acrobat
**2011** (11th)	Shanghai Lady Killer	Stalker Theatre presented by Brisbane Festival
**2011** (11th)	Wunderkammer	Brisbane Festival presents
**2012** (12th)
**2012** (12th)	**CIRCA**	**Circa**
**2012** (12th)	The Adventures of Alvin Sputnik:Deep Sea Explorer	Perth Theatre Company presents a Weeping Spoon production
**2012** (12th)	The Man the Sea Saw by Wolfe Bowart	SpoonTree Productions
**2012** (12th)	Raoul	La Compagnie du Hanneton presented by Perth International Arts Festival
**2013** (13th)
**2013** (13th)	**S**	**Circa**
**2013** (13th)	Concrete & Bone Sessions	Branch Nebula and Performing Lines presented by Sydney Festival
**2013** (13th)	It's Dark Outside	Tim Watts, Arielle Gray and Chris Isaacs presented by Perth Theatre Company
**2013** (13th)	Murder	Erth Visual & Physical Inc, produced by Intimate Spectacle, presented by Adelaide Festival, Sydney Festival & Ten Days on the Island
**2014** (14th)
**2014** (14th)	**Whelping Box**	**Branch Nebula, Matt Prest & Clare Britton, produced by Intimate Spectacle & Performing Lines, presented by Performance Space & Arts House**
**2014** (14th)	A Midsummer Night's Dream (As You Like It)	Chekhov International Theatre Festival, Dmitry Krymov's Laboratory and Perth International Arts Festival
**2014** (14th)	Circus Under My Bed	Sydney Opera House, Melbourne International Comedy Festival, Arts Centre Melbourne, The Flying Fruit Fly Circus
**2014** (14th)	Opus	Circa, a Nuits de Fourvière production/ Département du Rhône, coproduced with Les Théâtres de la ville de Luxembourg, GREC Festival of Barcelona, Le Cirque-Théâtre d’Elbeuf, Düsseldorf Festival, Barbican Theatre, CACCV Espace Jean Legendre-Compiegne, in association with the Confederation of Australian International Arts Festivals, Brisbane Festival, Perth International Arts Festival and Melbourne Festival
**2015** (15th)
**2015** (15th)	**The Paper Architect**	**Davy and Kristin McGuire and Perth International Arts Festival**
**2015** (15th)	Beyond by Circa	Arts Centre Melbourne and Circa
**2015** (15th)	Dislocate's If These Walls Could Talk	Marguerite Pepper Productions presented by Melbourne Festival
**2015** (15th)	Tabac Rouge	Compagnie du Hanneton presented by Sydney Festival
**2016** (16th)
**2016** (16th)	**Il Ritorno**	**Brisbane Festival and Circa**
**2016** (16th)	Tangi Wai... the cry of water	Victoria Hunt, Artful Management and Performance Space
**2016** (16th)	Plexus	Compagnie 111 – Aurélien Bory and Perth International Arts Festival
**2016** (16th)	The Last Blast	The Farm and Bleach* Festival
**2017** (17th)
**2017** (17th)	**Snake Sessions**	**Branch Nebula and Intimate Spectacle toured by Arts on Tour**
**2017** (17th)	Mermermer	Chunky Move
**2017** (17th)	Sediment	Company 2
**2017** (17th)	Still Life	Dimitris Papaioannou and Sydney Festival
**2018** (18th)
**2018** (18th)	**TIDE**	**Bleach* Festival and The Farm**
**2018** (18th)	Limbo Unhinged	Strut and Fret Production House
**2018** (18th)	Carrion	Justin Shoulder
**2018** (18th)	White Spirit	Zaman Production and Galerie Itinerrance in collaboration with the Musée du quai Branly — Jacques Chirac
**2019** (19th)
**2019** (19th)	**Out of Chaos...**	**Gravity and Other Myths**
**2019** (19th)	PLAYLIST	PYT Fairfield
**2019** (19th)	Personal	Jodee Mundy Collaborations
**2019** (19th)	Man With The Iron Neck	Legs On The Wall

== See also ==
- Helpmann Awards
- Physical theatre
- Puppetry
