= Helpmann Award for Best Female Performer in an Opera =

Annual Australian opera award

The Helpmann Award for Best Female Performer in an Opera is an award presented by Live Performance Australia (LPA) (the trade name for the Australian Entertainment Industry Association (AEIA)), an employers' organisation which serves as the peak body in the live entertainment and performing arts industries in Australia. The accolade is handed out at the annual Helpmann Awards, which celebrates achievements in musical theatre, contemporary music, comedy, opera, classical music, theatre, dance and physical theatre.

== Winners and nominees ==
In the following list winners are listed first and marked in gold, in boldface, and the nominees are listed below with no highlight.

Winners are listed first and marked in a separate colour, in boldface.

Year	Actor	Production	Character(s)
**2001** (1st)	**Anke Höppner**	**Madama Butterfly**	**Cio-Cio San (Madama Butterfly)**
2001 (1st)	Clare Gormley	The Eighth Wonder	Alexandra Mason
2001 (1st)	Yvonne Kenny	Capriccio	The Countess
2001 (1st)	Regina Schörg	La traviata	Violetta Valéry
**2002** (2nd)	**Lisa Gasteen**	**Tristan und Isolde**	**Isolde**
2002 (2nd)	Kate Ladner	The Marriage of Figaro	Countess Rosina Almaviva
2002 (2nd)	Margaret Medlyn	Parsifal	Kundry
2002 (2nd)	Elizabeth Whitehouse	Andrea Chénier	Maddalena de Coigny
**2003** (3rd)	**Elizabeth Whitehouse**	**Lady Macbeth of the Mtsensk District**	**Katerina Lvovna Izmailova**
2003 (3rd)	Elizabeth Campbell	Il trovatore	Azucena
2003 (3rd)	Joanna Cole	Lindy	Lindy Chamberlain
2003 (3rd)	Elizabeth Connell	Ariadne auf Naxos	Ariadne
**2004** (4th)	**Emma Matthews**	**Lulu**	**Lulu**
2004 (4th)	Kirsti Harms	Dead Man Walking	Sister Helen Prejean
2004 (4th)	Nicole Youl	Cavalleria rusticana and Pagliacci	Santuzza
2004 (4th)	Shu Cheen Yu	The Possessed	Judou
**2005** (5th)	**Lisa Gasteen**	**The Ring Cycle**	**Brünnhilde**
2005 (5th)	Cheryl Barker	Tosca	Floria Tosca
2005 (5th)	Bernadette Cullen	Il trovatore	Azucena
2005 (5th)	Tiffany Speight	The Magic Flute	Pamina/Papagena
**2006** (6th)	**Emma Matthews**	**Lakmé**	**Lakmé**
2006 (6th)	Elizabeth Connell	Nabucco	Abigaille
2006 (6th)	Rachelle Durkin	Rinaldo	Almirena
2006 (6th)	Emma Matthews	Romeo & Juliet	Juliet
**2007** (7th)	**Emma Matthews**	**The Love of the Nightingale**	**Philomele**
2007 (7th)	Cheryl Barker	Rusalka	Rusalka
2007 (7th)	Elvira Fatykhova	La traviata	Violetta Valéry
2007 (7th)	Susan Bullock	Tristan und Isolde	Isolde
**2008** (8th)	**Cheryl Barker**	**Arabella**	**Arabella**
2008 (8th)	Emma Matthews	Les Contes d'Hoffmann	Antonia, Giulietta, Olympia and Stella
2008 (8th)	Kirsti Harms	Dead Man Walking	Sister Helen Prejean
2008 (8th)	Elvira Fatykhova	Rigoletto	Gilda
**2009** (9th)	**Tiffany Speight**	**The Coronation of Poppea**	**Poppea**
2009 (9th)	Rachelle Durkin	A Flowering Tree	Kumudha
2009 (9th)	Susan Bullock	Lady Macbeth of Mtsensk	Katerina Lvovna Izmailova
2009 (9th)	Cheryl Barker	The Makropoulos Secret	Elina Makropulos
**2010** (10th)	**Emma Matthews**	**La sonnambula**	**Amina**
2010 (10th)	Susan Gritton	Peter Grimes	Ellen Orford
2010 (10th)	Takesha Meshé Kizart	Tosca	Floria Tosca
2010 (10th)	Lorina Gore	Bliss	Honey B
**2011** (11th)	**Emma Matthews**	**Partenope**	**Partenope**
2011 (11th)	Rachelle Durkin	La sonnambula	Amina
2011 (11th)	Rinat Shaham	Carmen	Carmen
2011 (11th)	Patricia Racette	Madama Butterfly	Cio-Cio San
**2012** (12th)	**Emma Matthews**	**La traviata**	**Violetta Valéry**
2012 (12th)	Rachelle Durkin	The Tales of Hoffmann	Antonia, Giulietta, Olympia and Stella
2012 (12th)	Susan Foster	Turandot	Princess Turandot
2012 (12th)	Eva Johansson	Elektra	Elektra
**2013** (13th)	**Cheryl Barker**	**Salome**	**Salome**
2013 (13th)	Sara Macliver	L'Orfeo	Euridice
2013 (13th)	Emma Matthews	Lucia di Lammermoor	Lucia
2013 (13th)	Tamar Iveri	Un ballo in maschera	Amelia
**2014** (14th)	**Christine Goerke**	**Elektra**	**Elektra**
2014 (14th)	Kathryn Lewek	Orlando	Angelica
2014 (14th)	Emma Matthews	The Turk in Italy	Fiorilla
2014 (14th)	Jessica Pratt	La traviata	Violetta
**2015** (15th)	**Jennifer Rivera**	**Faramondo**	**Faramondo**
2015 (15th)	Nicole Car	Faust	Marguerite
2015 (15th)	Caitlin Hulcup	Iphigénie en Tauride	Griselda
2015 (15th)	Latonia Moore	Aida	Aida
**2016** (16th)	**Nicole Car**	**Luisa Miller**	**Luisa Miller**
2016 (16th)	Latonia Moore	Don Carlos	Elisabeth de Valois
2016 (16th)	Jessica Pratt	Lucia di Lammermoor	Lucia
2016 (16th)	Ulrike Schneider	Agrippina	Agrippina
**2017** (17th)	**Lise Lindstrom**	**The Ring Cycle**	**Brünnhilde**
2017 (17th)	Nicole Car	Così fan tutte	Fiordiligi
2017 (17th)	Rachelle Durkin	Armida	Armida
2017 (17th)	Antoinette Halloran	Tosca	Tosca
**2018** (18th)	**Nicole Car**	**La Traviata**	**Violetta Valéry**
2018 (18th)	Taryn Fiebig	Triple Bill: Anacréon, Pigmalion and Erighetta e Don Chilone	The Priestess of Bacchus, The Statue and Erighetta
2018 (18th)	Helen Sherman	Coronation of Poppea	Poppea
2018 (18th)	Dimity Shepherd	Black Rider: The Casting of the Magic Bullets	Käthchen
**2019** (19th)	**Lise Lindstrom**	**Salome**	**Salome**
2019 (19th)	Vivica Genaux	Artaserse	Mandane
2019 (19th)	Lorina Gore	Wozzeck	Marie
2019 (19th)	Jessica Pratt	Lucia di Lammermoor	Lucia
