= Helpmann Award for Best Regional Touring Production =

Australian theatre award

The Helpmann Award for Best Regional Touring Production is an award presented by Live Performance Australia at the annual Helpmann Awards since 2007.

The award recognizes excellence in one production that has toured in the previous three years to no less than five venues across at least two Australian states and territories. At least three of the venues must be regional venues.

== Winners and nominees ==
Winners are listed first and marked in a separate colour, in boldface. Nominees are listed below with no highlight.

Year	Title	Production company(ies)
**2007** (7th)	**Six Dance Lessons in Six Weeks**	**Ensemble Productions with Christine Dunstan Productions**
2007 (7th)	Cosentino "Evolution"	Cosentino Entertainment
2007 (7th)	The Messiah	HotHouse Theatre
**2008** (8th)	**Keating!**	**Company B**
2008 (8th)	Mr McGee and the Biting Flea	Patch Theatre Company
2008 (8th)	True Stories	Bangarra Dance Theatre
2008 (8th)	Heroes	Queensland Theatre Company
2008 (8th)	Wendy Harmer's Pearlie in the Park	Monkey Baa Theatre for Young People
**2009** (9th)	**The 39 Steps**	**Fiery Angel Ltd** and **Kay & McLean Productions Pty Ltd**
2009 (9th)	Emily Loves to Bounce	Patch Theatre Company
2009 (9th)	The Arrival	Spare Parts Puppet Theatre and Country Arts WA
2009 (9th)	The Gathering	Taikoz
**2010** (10th)	**True Stories**	**Bangarra Dance Theatre**
2010 (10th)	The Kursk	Critical Stages and Matrix Theatre
2010 (10th)	The Age I'm In	Force Majeure and Performing Lines
2010 (10th)	Letter's End by Wolfe Bowart	Spoon Tree Productions
**2011** (11th)	**Mathinna**	**Bangarra Dance Theatre**
2011 (11th)	Red Sky Morning	Red Stitch Actors Theatre and Performing Lines
2011 (11th)	Untrained	Lucy Guerin Inc
2011 (11th)	Tuesdays with Morrie	Ensemble Productions
**2012** (12th)	**Namatjira**	**Big hART**
2012 (12th)	Julius Caesar	Bell Shakespeare
2012 (12th)	Africa	My Darling Patricia, Marguerite Pepper Productions, Performing Lines. A Malthouse Theatre
2012 (12th)	Rainbow's End	Riverside Productions
**2013** (13th)	**CIRCA**	**Performing Lines for Road Work**
2013 (13th)	Of earth & sky	Bangarra Dance Theatre
2013 (13th)	The Land of Yes & The Land of No	Sydney Dance Company
2013 (13th)	The Disappearances Project	Version 1.0

== See also ==
- Helpmann Awards
