= The Love of the Nightingale (opera) =

2007 opera by Richard Mills

The Love of the Nightingale is an opera in two acts by Richard Mills. The libretto by Timberlake Wertenbaker is based on her play of the same name. It is an adaptation of the ancient Greek legend of the rape of Philomela by her brother-in-law Tereus, and the gruesome revenge undertaken by Philomela and her sister Procne.

It premiered on 10 February 2007 at His Majesty's Theatre, Perth, Western Australia, in a co-production of Perth International Arts Festival, West Australian Opera, Queensland Music Festival, Opera Queensland, Queensland Performing Arts Centre and Victorian Opera. The Perth production received four Helpmann Awards in 2007: for Best Music Direction to Richard Mills; Best Female Performer in an Opera to Emma Matthews; Best Male Performer in a Supporting Role in an Opera to James Egglestone; and Best Female Performer in a Supporting Role in an Opera to Orla Boylan. The production was shown later that year at the Playhouse, Queensland Performing Arts Centre, Brisbane, and at Her Majesty's Theatre, Melbourne, with Richard Gill conducting.

In October 2011, Opera Australia produced the opera at the Sydney Opera House with Emma Matthews (Philomele), Anke Höppner (Procne), Elizabeth Campbell (Niobe), Richard Anderson (Tereus), the composer conducting.

== Roles ==
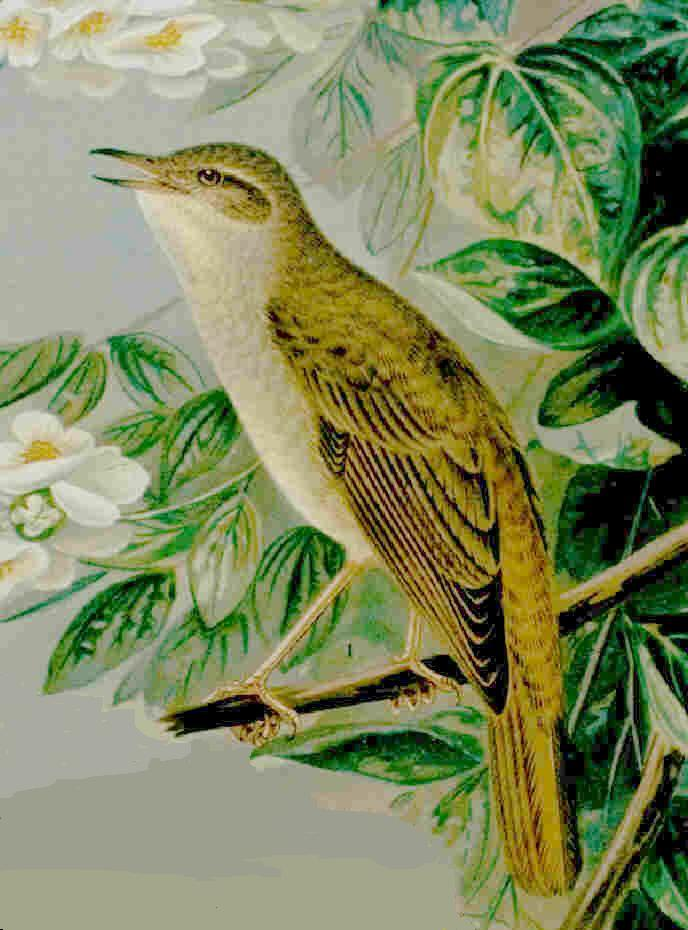

Roles, voice types, premiere cast
Role	Voice type	Premiere cast, 10 February 2007 Conductor: Richard Mills
Procne	soprano	Orla Boylan
Philomele	soprano	Emma Matthews
Niobe/Nurse/Narrator	mezzo-soprano	Elizabeth Campbell
Tereus	baritone	Douglas McNicol
Captain/Hippolytus/Narrator	tenor	James Egglestone
Itys	treble	Adrian Maydwell
Echo/Aphrodite	soprano	Sara Macliver
Hero	soprano	Tamsyn Stock-Stafford
Iris	soprano	Sarah-Janet Dougiamas
Helen/Phaedra	soprano	Annabelle Chaffey
June/The Queen	mezzo-soprano	Fiona Campbell
1st Soldier/King Pandion	tenor	Adrian McEniery
2nd Soldier	baritone	James Clayton
Wrestlers	mute roles	
Younger Itys	mute role	
Chorus
West Australian Symphony Orchestra
Director		Lindy Hume
Design		Dan Potra
Lighting		Nigel Levings
Costumes		Kate Hawley

== Synopsis ==
The play is a myth about men and women and the condition and experience of women in a patriarchy: fate, sexual conflict, suffering, female desire, the Apollonian and Dionysian and metamorphosis are its elements, but in the words of the drama, "We cannot rephrase it for you. If we could, why would we bother to show you the myth?"

=== Act 1 ===
Scene 1:	Against a background of war outside Athens,
Scene 2:	Athens—Procne and Philomele, two sisters, "discuss life's charms and the attractions of men." A dead soldier intervenes in the idyllic state of Procne and Philomele.
Scene 3:	King Pandion, their father, gives Procne in marriage to Tereus, liberator of Athens. Tereus and Procne leave for Thrace, the homeland of Tereus.
Scene 4:	Thrace—Procne has a child, Itys, and fantasises that Itys would one day be king and ruler.
Scene 5:	Five years pass; Procne is lonely for Philomele. Procne's companions sense a danger in sending Tereus back to Athens for Philomele, but they do not have the words to express it.
Scene 6:	Athens—King Pandion and Tereus discuss Philomele's journey to Thrace against a performance of the tragedy of Hippolytus and Phaedra. During the play, Tereus is struck by Aphrodite and falls in love with Philomele.
Scene 7:	Aboard Tereus' Ship—The voyage north with Tereus, his ship captain and followers begins, with Philomele accompanied by Niobe. Philomele plies the captain with questions; she is attracted to him.
Scene 8:	Thrace—At home, Procne's companions sense danger, "Your sister is on the sea and Tereus is a young man." Procne dismisses them.
Scene 9:	A Remote Shore—Tereus' followers, and in particular two soldiers, question the elongated travel time to Thrace. He evades their enquiries. They sense a darker subtext but choose to ignore it.
Scene 10:	Tereus lies, announcing Procne's death to Philomele, who is grief-stricken, demanding to see the body.
Scene 11:	Philomele and the captain talk and declare love. Tereus interrupts and kills the captain under the guise of protecting Philomele.
Scene 12:	Thrace/A Shore—Both sisters are on stage, juxtaposing their viewpoints. Philomele grieves the death of the captain and commiserates with Niobe. Procne awaits the arrival of Tereus and Philomele with the Thracian women. Tereus succumbs to Aphrodite, symbolically succumbing to lust.

=== Act 2 ===
Scene 1:	A Shore—On a moonlit beach Tereus declares his love for Philomele, quoting the words of Aphrodite from the play. Philomele rejects his proposition as against the law; he rapes her. Niobe recounts her life in a world in which women are brutalised.
Scene 2:	Thrace—Procne awaits Tereus amid her uncommunicative and knowing companions. Tereus returns and tells Procne that Philomele died on the voyage.
Scene 3:	A Shore—Niobe washes and comforts Philomele. Tereus enters. Philomele recognises that Procne is alive, "I can smell her on you. You! You lied!" She berates Tereus, revealing his impotence in the action of rape as he had to cut her hymen with a knife — he cuts out her tongue and leaves her.
Scene 4:	Niobe comforts Philomele. Tereus returns and gives her money to look after Philomele. He kisses Philomele and leaves her, "My sweet, my songless, my caged bird."
Scene 5:	Thrace—Procne, Itys and Tereus are together in the palace. Itys plays at being a soldier. Procne has become used to Thracian ways and announces that she will join the rituals of Bacchus. Tereus rejects her advances.
Scene 6:	The Bacchae fill the stage. The Thracian women perform their Bacchic rituals with Procne. Philomele enters and tells the story of her rape by Tereus using dolls she has crafted. Procne recognises Philomele and her silence, and Tereus' treachery. She swears revenge for her sister.
Scene 7:	Two soldiers are curious about the progress of the female Bacchic mysteries. Itys appears. The soldiers hold him up for a better view of the secret proceedings and he sees a woman with his sword.
Scene 8:	He runs in and demands his sword from Philomele — the women ritually slaughter him. The women then comment on violence and the lack of truth and communication in society, viewing Itys as the future incarnation of tyranny and power.
Scene 9:	Tereus enters in daylight and Procne reveals Philomele to him. She berates him and presents him with the mangled body of Itys as an image of himself and the future. Tereus takes Itys' sword and attempts to kill Procne and Philomele. The minor characters and narrators comment on the story. All three are transformed into birds. Philomele into a nightingale, Procne into a swallow and Tereus into a hoopoe.
Scene 10:	The work concludes with a postlude of metamorphosis; Itys questioning Philomele about her new life and Philomele, Procne and Tereus telling why they had to transform.

== Differences between play and opera ==
Themes: The Love of the Nightingale by Timberlake Wertenbaker positions the viewer to consider specifically the abuse of women and authority by men, and their supposed inability to "ask questions" and tendency to block out all forms of criticism. The play takes a far more feminist outlook on the Ancient Greek myth. The opera's thematic function can be considered to not specifically be the abuse of women and authority by men, but rather the general abuse of power and the lack of criticism of authority in society. The concept that violence stems from silence is also dealt with in the opera, with greater scrutiny than in the play.

Where does violence come from? I cannot answer this but I feel instinctively that it has to do with being silenced. The pen is mightier than the sword goes the old expression, yes, but it should be added that those who cannot use a pen will use a sword instead.

— Timberlake Wertenbaker, program notes

The message that the 3000-year-old myth of Philomele, Procne and Tereus carries from the ancient world to audiences in Australia in 2007 is that the power of words, the use of words – and particularly the ability to ask questions – is both a human right and a human responsibility.

— Lindy Hume, program notes

Plot: Minor plot details are changed in the opera. The role of Niobe's servant is truncated as well as the majority of dialogue being truncated from the play.

== Awards ==
Helpmann Awards
Preceded by Stephen Murphy	Best Music Direction; Richard Mills; 2007	Succeeded by Stephen Amos
Preceded by Emma Matthews	Best Female Performer in an Opera; Emma Matthews; 2007	Succeeded by Cheryl Barker
Preceded by Peter Coleman-Wright	Best Male Performer in a Supporting Role in an Opera; James Egglestone; 2007	Succeeded by James Egglestone
Preceded by Catherine Carby	Best Female Performer in a Supporting Role in an Opera; Orla Boylan; 2007	Succeeded by Emma Matthews
