= Emma Matthews =

Australian soprano opera singer

Emma Matthews AM
- Born: Emma Lysons; 1970 (age 55–56); Manchester, England
- Occupation: Soprano singer
- Years active: 1991–present
- Organisation: Opera Australia

Emma Matthews AM (née Lysons; born 1970) is an English-born Australian lyric coloratura soprano, noted for operatic roles, but also popular on the concert stage. A Principal Artist with Opera Australia, Matthews has received more Helpmann Awards than any other individual artist, nine Green Room Awards, the Mo Award and the Remy Martin Australian Opera Award.

== Life and career ==
Born Emma Lysons in Manchester, England, she grew up with three younger sisters in Fiji, where her father worked as a maritime pilot, and Vanuatu before moving to Cairns, Queensland, Port Hedland, Western Australia, and finally Perth. There she attended Perth Modern School before studying musical theatre at the Western Australian Conservatorium of Music (part of the Western Australian Academy of Performing Arts, WAAPA), but was persuaded by a teacher to switch to opera. She sang with the Gilbert and Sullivan Society of Western Australia in 1990. Since her 1991 professional debut with the West Australian Opera and appointment to Opera Australia in 1993, she has appeared in every state of Australia, notably with the State Opera of South Australia, Victorian State Opera and Opera Queensland, in Adelaide, Melbourne as well as frequent appearances at the Huntington Estate Music Festival for Musica Viva from 1994. In 2017 Matthews was appointed Head of Classical Voice at the Western Australian Academy of Performing Arts.

She is married to Stephen Matthews, a former chorister and later a stage mechanic with Opera Australia.

Matthews was appointed a Member of the Order of Australia in the 2023 King's Birthday Honours for "significant service to the performing arts, particularly opera".

== Roles ==
Her first roles took advantage of her sweet light coloratura voice (capable of a top F_{6}), her good looks, and her acting ability. She has appeared for Opera Australia as:

Damigella in L'incoronazione di Poppea (Monteverdi) in 1993
Ilia in Idomeneo (Mozart)
Hero in Béatrice et Bénédict (Berlioz)
Papagena and Pamina in The Magic Flute (Mozart)
Oscar in Un ballo in maschera (Verdi)
Sophie in Der Rosenkavalier (Richard Strauss)
Marie in La fille du régiment (Donizetti)
Nannetta in Falstaff (Verdi)
Rosina in The Barber of Seville (Rossini)
Blonde and Konstanze in Die Entführung aus dem Serail (Mozart)
Morgana in Alcina (Handel)
Almirena in Rinaldo (Handel)
Servilia in La clemenza di Tito (Mozart)
Cherubino in The Marriage of Figaro (Mozart)
Sophie in Werther (Massenet)
Adele in Die Fledermaus (Johann Strauss)

She has later taken on more challenging roles, often being compared with Joan Sutherland who, with her husband Richard Bonynge, was something of a friend and mentor.

Ismene in Mitridate, re di Ponto (Mozart) (produced by Graham Vick) for the 2001 Sydney Festival
Stasi in Die Csárdásfürstin (Kálmán)
Genovieffa in Suor Angelica (Puccini)
all four heroines (Stella, Olympia, Antonia, Giulietta) in The Tales of Hoffmann (Offenbach)
Zwaantie in Batavia (Richard Mills) 2001 world premiere
Lulu in Lulu (Alban Berg)
Bystrouškain/Sharpears, the Vixen in The Cunning Little Vixen (Janáček) for Opera Australia
Philomele in The Love of the Nightingale (Richard Mills) – 2007 world premiere
Cleopatra in Giulio Cesare (Handel)
Juliette in Roméo et Juliette (Gounod)
Lakmé in Lakmé (Delibes)
Lucia in Lucia di Lammermoor (Donizetti)
Giulietta in I Capuleti e i Montecchi (Bellini)
Gilda in Rigoletto (Verdi)
Violetta in La traviata (Verdi)

Matthews has also been well received in concerts, with a repertoire from Mozart's Requiem, Haydn Masses, and Handel's Messiah to works by Brahms, Poulenc and Villa Lobos, and Mahler's Symphonies No. 2 and No. 4. She appeared with José Carreras in Sydney 2008, then on New Year's Eve in Mozart's Great Mass in C minor with Sir Charles Mackerras and the Sydney Symphony Orchestra.

== Screen appearances ==
She appeared, billed as Emma Lysons, in the 1995 Alan John opera The Eighth Wonder about the Sydney Opera House, broadcast on ABC TV the night following its world premiere.

== Discography ==
=== Albums ===
List of albums, with selected details
Title	Details
Handel Arias (with New Zealand Chamber Orchestra & Donald Armstrong)	CD, released: 2001; Label: Artworks (AW029)
Emma Matthews in Monte Carlo	CD, released: 2009; Label: ABC Classics (476 3555)
Lakmé, Opera Australia	DVD, Blu-ray, released: 2012; Label: Sydney Opera House (OPOZ56020DVD, OPOZ56021BD)
Stars of Opera Australia compilation (Matthews in two selections from La Traviata concert on floating stage, Sydney Harbour, 24 March 2012.)	DVD, Blu-ray, released: 2013; Label: Sydney Opera House (OPOZ56041DVD)
Giuseppe Verdi, La Traviata as Violetta (on floating stage, 24 March 2012.)	DVD, Blu-ray, released: 2013; Label: Sydney Opera House
Mozart Arias (with Tasmanian Symphony Orchestra & Marko Letonja)	CD, released: 2014

== Awards and nominations ==
=== ABC Symphony Australia Young Performers Awards ===
The ABC Symphony Australia Young Performers Awards The ABC Young Performers Awards is a classical music competition for young people that ran annually from 1944 to 2015, and again from 2017.

Year	Nominee / work	Award	Result	Ref.
1993	Emma Matthews	ABC Young Performers Award	Won	

=== ARIA Music Awards ===
The ARIA Music Awards is an annual awards ceremony that recognises excellence, innovation, and achievement across all genres of Australian music. They commenced in 1987.

Year	Nominee / work	Award	Result	Ref.
2009	Emma Matthews in Monte Carlo	Best Classical Album	Nominated	
2014	Mozart Arias (with Tasmanian Symphony Orchestra & Marko Letonja)	Best Classical Album	Nominated	

=== Green Room Awards ===
- For her parts in Lulu, Clemenza di Tito, Rinaldo, The Marriage of Figaro, Batavia, Signor Bruschino, Julius Caesar and Lakmé.

=== Helpmann Awards ===
The Helpmann Awards is an awards show, celebrating live entertainment and performing arts in Australia, presented by industry group Live Performance Australia since 2001. Note: 2020 and 2021 were cancelled due to the COVID-19 pandemic.

Year	Nominee / work	Award	Result	Ref.
2004	Emma Matthews - Lulu	Best Female Performer in an Opera	Won	
2005	Emma Matthews - The Mikado	Best Female Actor in a Musical	Nominated	
2005	Emma Matthews - Der Rosenkavalier	Best Female Performer in a Supporting Role in an Opera	Nominated	
2006	Emma Matthews - Lakmé	Best Female Performer in an Opera	Won	
2006	Emma Matthews - Romeo & Juliet	Best Female Performer in an Opera	Nominated	
2007	Emma Matthews - The Love of the Nightingale	Best Female Performer in an Opera	Won	
2008	Emma Matthews - Les Contes d'Hoffmann	Best Female Performer in an Opera	Nominated	
2008	Emma Matthews - Arabella	Best Female Performer in a Supporting Role in an Opera	Won	
2010	Emma Matthews - La sonnambula	Best Female Performer in an Opera	Won	
2011	Emma Matthews - Partenope	Best Female Performer in an Opera	Won	
2012	Emma Matthews - La Traviata	Best Female Performer in an Opera	Won	
2013	Emma Matthews - Lucia di Lammermoor	Best Female Performer in an Opera	Nominated	
2014	Emma Matthews - The Turk in Italy	Best Female Performer in an Opera	Nominated	

=== Mo Awards ===
The Australian Entertainment Mo Awards (commonly known informally as the Mo Awards), were annual Australian entertainment industry awards. They recognise achievements in live entertainment in Australia from 1975 to 2016. Emma Matthews won one award in that time.

Year	Nominee / work	Award	Result (wins only)
2003	Emma Matthews	Classical Performer of the Year	Won
