= Helpmann Award for Best Ballet or Dance Work =

Annual Australian dance award

- Country: Australia
- Presented by: Live Performance Australia
- First award: 2001
- Currently held by: Sheoak, Bangarra Dance Theatre (2016)
- Website: www.helpmannawards.com.au

The Helpmann Award for Best Ballet or Dance Work was a dance award presented by Live Performance Australia at the annual Helpmann Awards from 2001 to 2016. The Helpmann Awards are Australia's national awards for live performance.

From 2017, the award was superseded by separate Helpmann award categories for Best Ballet and Best Dance Production.

Indigenous contemporary dance company Bangarra Dance Theatre received the award six times, and The Australian Ballet won it four times.

== Winners and nominees ==
Winners are listed first and marked in a separate colour, in boldface.

Year	Title	Production company(ies)
**2001** (1st)
**2001** (1st)	**Skin**	**Bangarra Dance Theatre**
**2001** (1st)	Body of Work - A Retrospective	Sydney Dance Company
**2001** (1st)	Hydra	Chunky Move
**2001** (1st)	Coppelia	West Australian Ballet
**2002** (2nd)
**2002** (2nd)	**Requiem**	**Australian Ballet & State Opera of South Australia**
**2002** (2nd)	Corroboree	Bangarra Dance Theatre
**2002** (2nd)	Eidos:Telos (Ballett Frankfurt)	Melbourne Festival
**2002** (2nd)	Tivoli	Australian Ballet & Sydney Dance Company
**2003** (3rd)
**2003** (3rd)	**Swan Lake**	**The Australian Ballet**
**2003** (3rd)	The Age of Unbeauty	Australian Dance Theatre
**2003** (3rd)	Ellipse	Sydney Dance Company
**2003** (3rd)	Walkabout	Bangarra Dance Theatre
**2004** (4th)
**2004** (4th)	**Bush**	**Bangarra Dance Theatre**
**2004** (4th)	Great Piper Dances	Sydney Festival in association with Sydney Opera House
**2004** (4th)	Held	Australian Dance Theatre in association with Adelaide Bank 2004 Festival of Arts and Anchorage Concert Association (Alaska)
**2004** (4th)	Underland	Sydney Dance Company
**2005** (5th)
**2005** (5th)	**Shen Wei Dance Arts**	**Sydney Festival in association with Sydney Opera House**
**2005** (5th)	Already Elsewhere	Sydney Festival
**2005** (5th)	Mr. B - A Tribute to George Balanchine	The Australian Ballet
**2005** (5th)	Shades of Gray	Sydney Dance Company
**2006** (6th)
**2006** (6th)	**Jiri**	**The Australian Ballet**
**2006** (6th)	A Midsummer Night's Dream	West Australian Ballet
**2006** (6th)	An Evening of Works by Russell Maliphant	George Piper Dances presented by Sydney Festival
**2006** (6th)	I Want to Dance Better at Parties	Chunky Move presented by Sydney Festival
**2007** (7th)
**2007** (7th)	**Structure & Sadness**	**Lucy Guerin Company**
**2007** (7th)	Lawn	Brisbane Powerhouse
**2007** (7th)	Monumental	Melbourne International Arts Festival and Ros Warby
**2007** (7th)	zero degrees	Les Ballets C. De La B. and Akram Khan Company presented by Sydney Festival
**2008** (8th)
**2008** (8th)	**Glow**	**Chunky Move presented by Melbourne Festival**
**2008** (8th)	Nutcracker	The Australian Ballet
**2008** (8th)	Roadkill	Brisbane Powerhouse and Dancenorth choreographed by Splintergroup
**2008** (8th)	Sacred Monsters	Akram Khan Co. presented by Adelaide Bank Festival of Arts 2008, Sydney Opera House and Brisbane Powerhouse
**2009** (9th)
**2009** (9th)	**Mathinna**	**Bangarra Dance Theatre**
**2009** (9th)	Firebird	The Australian Ballet
**2009** (9th)	Two Faced Bastard	Melbourne International Arts Festival and Chunky Move
**2009** (9th)	we unfold	Sydney Dance Company
**2010** (10th)
**2010** (10th)	**FIRE**	**Bangarra Dance Theatre**
**2010** (10th)	Dyad 1929	The Australian Ballet
**2010** (10th)	Harakiri - a rite	STRUT dance
**2010** (10th)	KORPER	Melbourne International Arts Festival and Sasha Waltz
**2011** (11th)
**2011** (11th)	**Where the Heart Is**	**Expressions Dance Company and Queensland Performing Arts Centre**
**2011** (11th)	Sutra	Sydney Opera House and Brisbane Festival
**2011** (11th)	Amplification	BalletLab and Phillip Adams (with C.U.B Malthouse)
**2011** (11th)	Vertical Road	Melbourne Festival and Akram Khan Company
**2012** (12th)
**2012** (12th)	**Can We Talk About This?**	**Presented by DV8 Theatre and Sydney Opera House. Co-produced by Theatre de la Ville and Festival d'Automne Paris, National Theatre of Great Britain and Dansens Hus Stockholm**
**2012** (12th)	Anatomy of an Afternoon	Martin del Amo, Performing Lines and Sydney Festival
**2012** (12th)	Aviary: A Suite for the Bird	Phillip Adams BalletLab in Melbourne Festival 2011
**2012** (12th)	MASS	Dancenorth
**2013** (13th)
**2013** (13th)	**TERRAIN**	**Bangarra Dance Theatre**
**2013** (13th)	Black Project 1 & 2	Antony Hamilton Projects, Arts House & Insite Arts
**2013** (13th)	Keep Everything	Chunky Move
**2013** (13th)	Cacti	Sydney Dance Company
**2014** (14th)
**2014** (14th)	**Chroma**	**The Australian Ballet**
**2014** (14th)	Ballet at the Quarry: Radio and Juliet	West Australian Ballet presented in association with Perth International Arts Festival
**2014** (14th)	Bolshoi Ballet – The Bright Stream	Queensland Performing Arts Centre and Tourism and Events Queensland
**2014** (14th)	Sadeh21	Batsheva Dance Company, Adelaide Festival and Perth International Arts Festival
**2015** (15th)
**2015** (15th)	**Frame of Mind**	**Sydney Dance Company**
**2015** (15th)	MEETING	Antony Hamilton Projects, Arts House and Insite Arts
**2015** (15th)	Motion Picture	Lucy Guerin Inc in association with Arts House
**2015** (15th)	precipice	Rachel Arianne Ogle
**2016** (16th)
**2016** (16th)	**Sheoak**	**Bangarra Dance Theatre**
**2016** (16th)	Cockfight	Performing Lines and The Farm
**2016** (16th)	Habitus	Australian Dance Theatre
**2016** (16th)	Spectra	Dancenorth

== See also ==
- Dance in Australia
