= Helpmann Award for Best Presentation for Children =

Annual Australian award

- Country: Australia
- Presented by: Live Performance Australia (LPA)
- First award: 2002
- Currently held by: Robot Song - Arena Theatre Company (2019)
- Website: helpmannawards.com.au

The Helpmann Award for Best Presentation for Children is an award, presented by Live Performance Australia (LPA) at the annual Helpmann Awards since 2001.

The award recognises excellence in live performance created especially for children and young persons up to the age of 18 years.

== Winners and nominees ==
Winners are listed first and marked in a separate colour, in boldface. Nominees are listed below with no highlight.

| Year | Title | Production company(ies) |
|---|---|---|
| **2002** (2nd) | **Hi-5 Alive** | **International Concert Attractions, Kids Like Us Productions and Channel 9** |
| **2002** (2nd) | Mad, Bad and Spooky | Sydney Festival and Theatre of Image |
| **2002** (2nd) | Mice – A Cheesy Little Musical | Barking Gecko Theatre Company |
| **2002** (2nd) | The Sign of the Seahorse | Playbox and Melbourne Symphony Orchestra |
| **2003** (3rd) | **Twinkle, Twinkle, Little Fish** | **Windmill Performing Arts** |
| **2003** (3rd) | Aesop and His Fables | Barking Gecko Theatre Company |
| **2003** (3rd) | The Lion, the Witch and the Wardrobe | Malcolm C. Cookie & Associates |
| **2003** (3rd) | Out of the Blue | Spare Parts Puppet Theatre |
| **2004** (4th) | **The Happy Prince** | **Kim Carpenter's Theatre of Image** |
| **2004** (4th) | H2O - A Fantastical Voyage | Spare Parts Puppet Theatre |
| **2004** (4th) | Hidden Dragons | Barking Gecko Theatre Company |
| **2004** (4th) | Santa's Kingdom | David Atkins Enterprises, Garry Van Egmond Enterprises and International Concert Attractions |
| **2005** (5th) | **Riverland** | |
| **2005** (5th) | Gamegirl | Arena Theatre Company |
| **2005** (5th) | Possum Magic - The Musical | Garry Ginivan Attractions in association with the Arts Centre |
| **2005** (5th) | The Red Tree | |
| **2006** (6th) | '**Stella and the Moon Man'** | Kim Carpenter's Theatre of Image with Sydney Theatre Company and Australian Youth Orchestra |
| **2006** (6th) | The Green Sheep | Windmill Performing Arts |
| **2006** (6th) | Rabbit | Buzz Dance Theatre |
| **2006** (6th) | Space Magic | Hi-5 Productions |
| **2007** (7th) | **Jackie French's Hitler's Daughter** | **Monkey Baa Theatre for Young People** |
| **2007** (7th) | The Adventures of Snugglepot & Cuddlepie and Little Ragged Blossom | Windmill Performing Arts and Company B in association with Sydney Festival, Perth International Arts Festival & Adelaide Festival Centre |
| **2007** (7th) | Emily Loves to Bounce! | Patch Theatre Company |
| **2007** (7th) | The Fairies Live on Stage | Andrew Kay & Associates, GGA & ABC |
| **2008** (8th) | **Mr McGee and the Biting Flea** | **Patch Theatre Company** |
| **2008** (8th) | My Grandma lived in Gooligulch | Gooligulch Productions in association with Garry Ginivan Attractions |
| **2008** (8th) | Hoods | Real T.V. |
| **2008** (8th) | Cat | Windmill Performing Arts |
| **2009** (9th) | **The Promise** | **The Flying Fruit Fly Circus** |
| **2009** (9th) | Angelina's Star Performance performed by the English National Ballet | The Arts Centre |
| **2009** (9th) | The Clockwork Forest | Windmill and Brink Productions |
| **2009** (9th) | Just Macbeth! | Bell Shakespeare |
| **2010** (10th) | **Thursday's Child** | **Monkey Baa Theatre for Young People** |
| **2010** (10th) | The Wizard of Oz | Windmill Theatre |
| **2010** (10th) | The Shape of a Girl | Sydney Opera House |
| **2010** (10th) | The Book of Everything | Company B Belvoir and Kim Carpenter's Theatre of Image |
| **2011** (11th) | **Me and My Shadow** | **Patch Theatre Company** |
| **2011** (11th) | GRUG | Windmill Theatre and Queensland Performing Arts Centre |
| **2011** (11th) | Dinosaur Petting Zoo | Erth Visual & Physical Inc. presented by Ten Days on the Island |
| **2011** (11th) | Wombat Stew | Garry Ginivan Attractions in association with Regional Arts Victoria |
| **2012** (12th) | **Boats** | **Terrapin Puppet Theatre** |
| **2012** (12th) | White | Arts Centre Melbourne, Sydney Opera House, Adelaide Festival Centre, Windmill Theatre Company and Casula Powerhouse Arts Centre |
| **2012** (12th) | The Red Tree | Barking Gecko Theatre Company and Perth International Arts Festival |
| **2012** (12th) | Statespeare | shake & stir theatre co |
| **2013** (13th) | **School Dance** | **Windmill Theatre** |
| **2013** (13th) | Cautionary Tales for Children | Arena Theatre Company |
| **2013** (13th) | The Yard | CAPTIVATE and Shaun Parker & Company |
| **2013** (13th) | How High the Sky | Polyglot Theatre |
**2014** (14th)
| **2014** (14th) | **Pinocchio** | **Windmill Theatre and State Theatre Company of South Australia** |
| **2014** (14th) | Storm Boy | Barking Gecko Theatre Company and Sydney Theatre Company |
| **2014** (14th) | Miss Ophelia | Arts Centre Melbourne and Sydney Opera House |
| **2014** (14th) | The House Where Winter Lives | Punchdrunk and Perth International Arts Festival |
| **2014** (14th) | Wulamanayuwi & the Seven Pamanui | Darwin Festival and Performing Lines |
**2015** (15th)
| **2015** (15th) | **The Rabbits** | **An Opera Australia and Barking Gecko Theatre Company co- production. In association with West Australian Opera. Commissioned by Perth International Arts Festival and Melbourne Festival** |
| **2015** (15th) | Pete The Sheep | Monkey Baa Theatre Company |
| **2015** (15th) | Hans Christian, You Must Be an Angel | Sydney Opera House and Arts Centre Melbourne |
| **2015** (15th) | Carnival of the Animals | Circa and QPAC's Out of the Box Festival |
**2016** (16th)
| **2016** (16th) | **Bambert's Book of Lost Stories** | **Barking Gecko Theatre Company** |
| **2016** (16th) | The Young King | Slingsby Theatre Company |
| **2016** (16th) | Oddysea | Sensorium Theatre and Performing Lines WA |
| **2016** (16th) | ROALD DAHL'S Revolting Rhymes and Dirty Beasts | shake & stir theatre co |
**2017** (17th)
| **2017** (17th) | **Jump First, Ask Later** | **Powerhouse Youth Theatre and Force Majeure** |
| **2017** (17th) | In a Deep Dark Forest | The Inhabitors and Arts Centre Melbourne |
| **2017** (17th) | Cerita Anak (Child's Story) | Polyglot Theatre and Papermoon Puppet Theatre, presented by Arts Centre Melbourne and Asia TOPA |
| **2017** (17th) | New Owner | The Last Great Hunt |
**2018** (18th)
| **2018** (18th) | **Emil and the Detectives** | **Slingsby** |
| **2018** (18th) | JUNK | Flying Fruit Fly Circus, Sydney Opera House and the Arts Centre Melbourne |
| **2018** (18th) | Tetris | DreamBIG Children's Festival 2017, Adelaide Festival Centre and Arch 8 |
| **2018** (18th) | The Secret Life of Suitcases | Arts Centre Melbourne, Ailie Cohen Puppet Maker and the Unicorn Theatre, London |
**2019** (19th)
| **2019** (19th) | **Robot Song** | **Arena Theatre Company** |
| **2019** (19th) | Wolfgang's Magical Musical Circus | Circa |
| **2019** (19th) | Baba Yaga | Windmill Theatre Company and Imaginate |
| **2019** (19th) | A Call to Dance | Amrita Hepi and Performing Lines |

== See also ==
- Helpmann Awards
