= Iota (singer) =

- Born: Sean Hape; 7 May 1968 (age 58); Pinjarra, Western Australia, Australia
- Occupations: Singer, songwriter, actor
- Instruments: Vocals, guitar
- Label: Black Yak Records

Sean Hape (born 7 May 1968), known professionally as Iota (stylised iOTA), is a New Zealand-Australian singer-songwriter and actor. As a musician, he has released six studio albums and was nominated for Best Independent Release for The Hip Bone Connection (1999) at the ARIA Music Awards of 2000. He has won four Helpmann Awards: Best Male Actor in a Musical in 2007 for Hedwig in Hedwig and the Angry Inch (2006 Australian cast) and Best Cabaret Performer, Best New Australian Work and Best Original Score for his work in Smoke and Mirrors in 2010.

== Personal life ==
iOTA has stated that his parents met in New Zealand; his father is Māori and his mother English. He grew up in Pinjarra, Western Australia, where his father worked at an alumina refinery.

At high school, iOTA took drama and music as electives, so he could "slack off for two hours"; he formed his first band, which was short-lived, at the age of 16.

iOTA moved out of home at age 17, into a caravan and lived for several years on the dole, while playing with a hard rock band called Loose Goose. He worked as a mechanic's apprentice before his career as an entertainer took off.

Loose Goose moved to Sydney, when iOTA was 23.

iOTA changed his name by deed poll when he was 26. iOTA has cited three reasons for this: wanting to begin a new identity as an entertainer, being openly gay, and being a recovering alcoholic.

== Music ==
iOTA's first album The Hip Bone Connection was released in 1999 and was nominated for ARIA Award for Best Independent Release. Following the release of the album, iOTA was labelled as an acoustic/blues/roots musician, a characterization he disagrees with.

His second, Big Grandfather, was considered less accessible and more atmospheric, and was not as successful as his first. His third, La Caravana, "is about the nomadic life of a musician". His fourth and most recent is Beauty Queen of the Sea and uses a full electric band, moving towards rock and away from his previous roots label.

In November 2019 it was announced that iOTA would be a participant in Eurovision – Australia Decides; in an attempt to represent Australia in the Eurovision Song Contest 2020. He competed with the song, "Life" and finished 9th.

== Acting ==
As an actor, iOTA has performed on stage in Australia as an angel in Sydney Dance Company's Berlin, as Frank-N-Furter in The Rocky Horror Show, as Hedwig in Hedwig and the Angry Inch, and in the original productions Smoke & Mirrors and B-Girl.

His acting has won him Helpmann Awards for Best Male Actor in a Musical (for Hedwig and the Angry Inch) in 2007, and Best Cabaret Performer (for Smoke & Mirrors) in 2010. He also received Helpmann Awards for Best New Australian Work and Best Original Score for Smoke & Mirrors.

He appeared in George Miller's 2015 film Mad Max: Fury Road (the fourth in the Mad Max series) as the Doof Warrior, an eyeless guitarist working for Immortan Joe whose guitar is also a flamethrower. He has said he learned to act by necessity: "In the country, poofters are there to be bashed, or ridiculed. So I put on a mask, and became tough and rowdy: the long hair, the slouching, the spitting, lots of drinking piss." iOTA can be seen in Baz Luhrmann's 2013 film The Great Gatsby as Trimalcio the orchestra leader.

He is one of two singers for the character of Walter Walrus on the animated Netflix series Beat Bugs, along with Daniel Johns.

== Discography ==
=== Albums ===
List of albums, with Australian chart positions
Title	Album details	Peak chart positions
Title	Album details	AUS
The Hip Bone Connection	Released: August 1999; Label: Mammal Records (002); Format: CD	82
Big Grandfather	Released: 2001; Label: Black Yak (BYOA17); Format: CD, DD	-
La Caravana	Released: 2003; Label: Black Yak (BYOA31); Format: CD, DD	-
Beauty Queen of the Sea	Released: 2006; Label: Black Yak (BYOA34); Format: CD, DD	-
iOTA	Released: 2015; Label: iOTA (01); Format: CD, DD, streaming	-
Wolf Number Nine	Released: March 2016; Label: iOTA (02); Format: CD, DD, streaming	-
Hours Disappear	Released: 25 September 2026; Label: Format: CD, DD, streaming	-

==== Live albums ====
List of live albums
Title	Details
One of Life's Simple Pleasures	Released: 2002; Recorded: October 1996; Label: Black Yak Records (RR303); Format: CD, DD

=== EPs ===
List of extended plays
Title	Details
Iota	Released: 1998; Label: Mammal Records (001); Format: CD
Little Carlos	Released: 2000; Label: Black Yak (BYOE15); Format: CD, DD

=== Singles ===
List of singles as lead artist
Title	Year	Album
"Struttin' Rock Rooster"	2001	Big Grandfather
"Million Miles"	2001	Big Grandfather
"Wooden Skeletons"	2002	Big Grandfather
"Scars"	2002	La Caravana
"Pockets"	2002	La Caravana
"Pigs"	2003	La Caravana
"I Want It Again"	2004	non-album single
"Handle on It"	2006	Beauty Queen of the Sea
"Come Back for Me"	2006	Beauty Queen of the Sea
"Life"	2020	Australia Decides
"Home Song" / "Bitter Wine"	2026	Hours Disappear

== Awards and nominations ==
=== ARIA Music Awards ===
The ARIA Music Awards are a set of annual ceremonies presented by Australian Recording Industry Association (ARIA), which recognise excellence, innovation, and achievement across all genres of the music of Australia. They commenced in 1987.

Year	Nominee / work	Award	Result	Ref.
2000	The Hip Bone Connection	Best Independent Release	Nominated	

=== Helpmann Awards ===
The Helpmann Awards is an awards show, celebrating live entertainment and performing arts in Australia, presented by industry group Live Performance Australia since 2001. Note: 2020 and 2021 were cancelled due to the COVID-19 pandemic.

Year	Nominee / work	Award	Result	Ref.
2007	Iota - Hedwig and the Angry Inch	Best Male Actor in a Musical	Won	
2008	Iota - Richard O'Brien's Rocky Horror Show	Best Male Actor in a Musical	Nominated	
2010	Iota - Smoke & Mirrors	Best Cabaret Performer	Won	
2010	Iota - Smoke & Mirrors	Best New Australian Work	Won	
2010	Iota - Smoke & Mirrors	Best Original Score	Won	
