= Nicole Car =

Australian opera singer

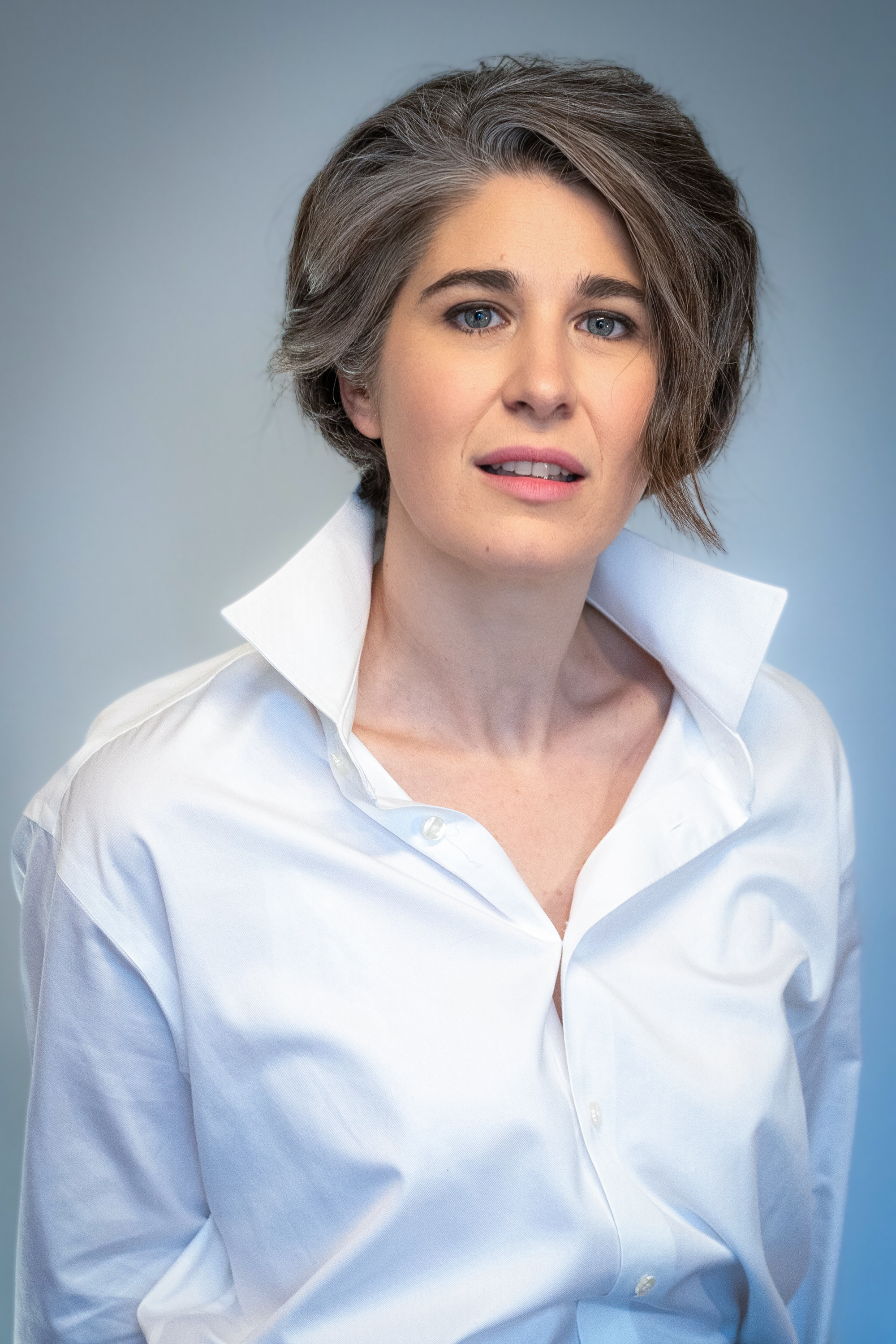
- Car in 2025
- Born: 12 December 1985 (age 40); Melbourne, Australia
- Occupation: Opera singer (soprano)
- Years active: 2009–present
- Website: www.nicolecar.com

Nicole Car (born 12 December 1985) is an Australian operatic soprano. She has performed leading roles at the Metropolitan Opera, Royal Opera House, Vienna State Opera, Bavarian State Opera, Deutsche Oper Berlin, Semperoper Dresden, Opéra national de Paris, The Dallas Opera, and Opera Australia. Car is particularly associated with the roles of Tatyana in Eugene Onegin, Mimì in La bohème, Marguerite in Faust, Micaëla in Carmen and both Fiordiligi in Così fan tutte and Donna Elvira in Don Giovanni. In recent seasons has also given noted performances as Elisabetta in Don Carlo, Amelia in Simon Boccanegra, Blanche de la Force in Dialogues des Carmélites and the title role in Rusalka.

== Early life and education ==
Car attended Strathmore Secondary School, where she performed in school musicals. In Year 12 she sang at the Victorian Schools' Spectacular, singing jazz songs from the 1930s and 40s.

At age 17, Car saw her first opera, Tosca, in her final year of high school in Melbourne. She then completed a Bachelor of Music at the Victorian College of the Arts, rather than the legal degree her parents had hoped for.

== Career ==
Car's debut in a major role was Donna Anna in Don Giovanni with Victorian Opera in 2009. She began performing with Opera Australia from 2014 debuting a number of roles including the title parts of La traviata, Thaïs and Luisa Miller (winning her first Helpmann Award for the latter); Fiordiligi (Così fan tutte), Tatyana (Eugene Onegin), Micaëla (Carmen), Mimi (La bohème), Marguerite (Faust), Pamina (The Magic Flute), Leila (The Pearl Fishers), and both Donna Anna and Donna Elvira (Don Giovanni).

She made her American debut singing the Countess in The Marriage of Figaro at Dallas Opera in 2014, a role previously performed for Opera Australia. Car made her Covent Garden debut in 2015, singing Micaëla in Bizet's Carmen, followed by Tatyana in Tchaikovsky's Eugene Onegin and a new production of La bohème as Mimì in the 2017/18 season. In 2020 she returned to the Royal Opera House as Mimì. Car had previously performed the role of Micaëla for Handa Opera on Sydney Harbour in 2013.

In a review of her first recording, The Kiss, Car is described as possessing "a lovely lyric soprano".

In 2019 Car visited Australia to sing the role of Ellen in a recital version of the Benjamin Britten opera Peter Grimes with the Sydney Symphony Orchestra. In Sydney she was joined by her husband Étienne Dupuis and sang a series of concerts together. In the 2019/2020 season, she performed Tatyana to Étienne Dupuis' Eugene Onegin for Opera Australia at the Sydney Opera House. The duo went on to sing in Eugene Onegin in at Montreal Opera House in 2019, with Car making her Canadian debut.

In Germany, Car has performed at the Deutsche Oper Berlin (Tatyana, Fiordiligi, Marguerite.Verdi Gala, Thaïs), the Semperoper Dresden (Mimì, Fiordiligi) and the Bavarian State Opera in Munich (Tatyana).

Car made her debut at the Metropolitan Opera in New York in the role of Mimì (La bohème) in September 2018, receiving critical acclaim from The New York Times for her "fine-grained tone and nuanced acting". She returned to the Met in 2020 as Fiordiligi in Così fan tutte.

Performances at the Paris Opera have included Tatyana, Mimì, Micaëla and her role debut as Elisabetta di Valois in Don Carlo in the 2019/2020 season. She also sang the role of Donna Elvira in Don Giovanni in a new production at the Paris Opera which was broadcast by many international cinemas.

In April 2020 Car launched the Freelance Artist Relief Australia fund, a crowd-sourced trust dedicated to supporting Australian freelance artists during the Covid-19 pandemic. She returned to Australia in 2025 to sing her role debut as Rusalka in Sarah Giles' production of the eponymous opera for Opera Australia, her performance described as the "perfect showcase for Car's lustrous voice".

== Opera roles ==
- Adalgisa, Norma (Bellini)
- Countess, The Marriage of Figaro (Mozart)
- Donna Anna, Don Giovanni (Mozart)
- Donna Elvira, Don Giovanni (Mozart)
- Elisabetta, Don Carlo (Verdi)
- Fiordiligi, Così fan tutte (Mozart)
- Leïla, The Pearl Fishers (Bizet)
- Luisa Miller, Luisa Miller (Verdi)
- Micaëla, Carmen (Bizet)
- Mimì, La bohème (Puccini)
- Pamina, The Magic Flute (Mozart)
- Rusalka, Rusalka (Dvořák)
- Tatyana, Eugene Onegin (Tchaikovsky)
- Thaïs, Thaïs (Massenet)
- Violetta Valéry, La traviata (Verdi)

== Personal life ==
Car is married to Canadian baritone Étienne Dupuis. They have one child, Noah. Car was previously married to engineer Robin Stephenson.

== Discography ==
=== Albums ===
List of albums, with selected details
Title	Details
The Kiss (with Australian Opera, Australian Ballet Orchestra and Andrea Molino)	Released: February 2016; Format: CD, Digital; Label: ABC Classics
Heroines (with Australian Chamber Orchestra, Richard Tognetti)	Released: 2018; Format: CD, Digital; Label: ABC Classics

== Awards and nominations ==
- At 21, while in her final year at the Victorian College of the Arts, Car won the 2007 Herald Sun Aria, performing arias by Verdi and Puccini. In making the announcement, chief adjudicator Anson Austin said she has "a wonderful talent and a most beautiful voice".
- In 2013 Car won joint first prize in the Neue Stimmen vocal competition held in Germany.

=== ARIA Music Awards ===
The ARIA Music Awards are presented annually from 1987 by the Australian Recording Industry Association (ARIA).

Year	Nominee / work	Award	Result	Ref.
2016	This Kiss	Best Classical Album	Nominated	

=== Australian Women in Music Awards ===
The Australian Women in Music Awards is an annual event that celebrates outstanding women in the Australian Music Industry who have made significant and lasting contributions in their chosen field. They commenced in 2018.

Year	Nominee / work	Award	Result
2025	Nicole Car	Opera Impact Award	Won

=== Helpmann Awards ===
- Car won a Helpmann Award in 2016 for Best Female Performer in an Opera for her role in Luisa Miller for Opera Australia.
- She won the 2018 Helpmann Award for Best Female Performer in an Opera for La traviata, Opera Australia.
