= Helpmann Award for Best Comedy Performer =

Annual Australian award

The Helpmann Award for Best Comedy Performer is an award, presented by Live Performance Australia (LPA) at the annual Helpmann Awards since 2006.

== Winners and nominees ==
Winners are listed first and marked in a separate colour, in boldface.

Year	Performer(s)	Production
**2006** (6th)	**Colin Lane** and **Frank Woodley**	**Lano & Woodley – Goodbye**
2006 (6th)	Akmal Saleh	Akmal Live!
2006 (6th)	Judith Lucy	I Failed!
2006 (6th)	David Collins & Shane Dundas	The Umbilical Brothers – The Rehearsal
**2007** (7th)	**Adam Hills**	**Adam Hills – Joymonger**
2007 (7th)	Akmal Saleh	Akmal Live!
2007 (7th)	Fiona O'Loughlin	N/A
2007 (7th)	Tom Gleeson	Tom On!
**2008** (8th)	**David Collins** & **Shane Dundas**	**The Umbilical Brothers – Don't Explain**
2008 (8th)	Frank Woodley	Possessed
2008 (8th)	Julia Morris	Shoosh Please!
2008 (8th)	Ross Noble	N/A
**2009** (9th)	**Tim Minchin**	**Tim Minchin – Ready For This?**
2009 (9th)	Adam Hills	Adam Hills – Inflatable
2009 (9th)	Judith Lucy	Judith Lucy's Not Getting Any Younger
2009 (9th)	Julia Morris	"Don't you know who I use to be?"
**2010** (10th)	**Wil Anderson**	**Wil Anderson – Wilful Misconduct**
2010 (10th)	Kitty Flanagan	Charming and Alarming
2010 (10th)	Fiona O'Loughlin	On a Wing and A Prayer
2010 (10th)	Hannah Gadsby	Hannah Gadsby – The Cliff Young Shuffle
**2011** (11th)	**Denise Scott**	**Regrets**
2011 (11th)	Hannah Gadsby	Mrs Chuckles
2011 (11th)	Tom Gleeson	Up Himself
2011 (11th)	Wil Anderson	Man vs Wil
**2012** (12th)	**Tim Minchin**	**Tim Minchin vs The Orchestras Round II**
2012 (12th)	Wil Anderson	Wilarious
2012 (12th)	Judith Lucy	Nothing Fancy
2012 (12th)	Sam Simmons	About the Weather
**2013** (13th)	**Julia Morris**	**No Judgement**
2013 (13th)	Kitty Flanagan	Hello Kitty Flanagan
2013 (13th)	Hannah Gadsby	Happiness is a Bedside Table
2013 (13th)	Wil Anderson	GoodWil
**2014** (14th)	**Sam Simmons**	**Death Of A Sails-Man**
2014 (14th)	Ronny Chieng	Chieng Reaction
2014 (14th)	Tom Gleeson	Quality
2014 (14th)	The Boy With Tape on His Face	More Tape
**2015** (15th)	**Judith Lucy**	**Ask No Questions of the Moth**
2015 (15th)	Ronny Chieng	You Don't Know What You're Talking About
2015 (15th)	Nazeem Hussain	Legally Brown
2015 (15th)	Matt Okine	The Other Guy
2015 (15th)	Sam Simmons	Spaghetti for Breakfast
**2016** (16th)	**Tom Ballard**	**The World Keeps Happening**
2016 (16th)	Zoë Coombs Marr	Trigger Warning
2016 (16th)	Doug Anthony Allstars – Paul McDermott, Tim Ferguson, Paul Livingston	Reunion. Rebirth
2016 (16th)	Julia Morris	I Don't Want Your Honest Feedback
**2017** (17th)	**Hannah Gadsby**	**Nanette**
2017 (17th)	Aunty Donna	Big Boys
2017 (17th)	Tom Ballard	Problematic
2017 (17th)	Joel Creasey	Poser
2017 (17th)	Nazeem Hussain	Public Frenemy Nazeem Hussain
2017 (17th)	Sammy J	Hero Complex
**2018** (18th)	**Celia Pacquola**	**All Talk**
2018 (18th)	Urzila Carlson	Studies Have Shown
2018 (18th)	Zoë Coombs Marr	Bossy Bottom
2018 (18th)	Anne Edmonds	Helen Bidou – Enter the Spinnaker Lounge
2018 (18th)	Colin Lane & Frank Woodley	Lano & Woodley – Fly
2018 (18th)	Julia Morris	Lift and Separate Golden Jubilee
2018 (18th)	Rhys Nicholson	Seminal
