= The Adventures of Snugglepot & Cuddlepie and Little Ragged Blossom (musical) =

Musical by John Clarke and Alan John with Doug MacLeod

The Adventures of Snugglepot & Cuddlepie and Little Ragged Blossom is a musical with book and lyrics by John Clarke with Doug MacLeod and music and additional lyrics by Alan John. It is based on the Snugglepot and Cuddlepie books created by Australian author May Gibbs.

== Synopsis ==
The story centres on the two characters of Snugglepot and Cuddlepie, who befriend a Blossom and search the unknown land of Australia. Unlike other adaptations, this version is a political satire.

== Production ==
It premiered at the Theatre Royal in Sydney on 9 January 2007, presented by Windmill Performing Arts and Company B in association with the Sydney Festival, Perth International Arts Festival and Adelaide Festival Centre. Adult actors played the parts of the gumnut babies - Darren Gilshenan (Cuddlepie), Tim Richards (Snugglepot) and Ursula Yovich (Ragged Blossom).

== Songs ==
=== Act l ===
- Season of Love in the Bush
- Mates
- Are We There Yet?
- Lizard's Rock (Be Clever and Resourceful)
- Are We There Yet? (reprise)
- Top of the Tree
- The Bushland Rap
- Lost and Found
- How Do You Speak to a Girl?
- Eucalyptus Blues
- Are We There Yet? (reprise)

=== Act ll ===
- The Call of the Sea
- Bein' Bad's Great
- Great Escape
- We Need to Get Serious (Deadibones)
- Confusing
- Safely Home
- They're Nothing Without Me
- Are We There Yet? (reprise)
- Clash of the Reptiles
- Lost and Found

== Cast ==
	2007 Cast
Snugglepot	Tim Richards
Cuddlepie	Darren Gilshenan
Ragged Blossom	Ursula Yovich
B.T. Lizard	Simon Burke
Mrs. Snake	Kris McQuade
Fantail	Ana Maria Belo
Frog	Mitchell Butel
Magpie	Ed Wightman
Cockatoo	Lara Mulcahy
Kookaburra	James Millar
Numbat	Jolyon James
Galah	Andrew Koblar

== Awards ==
The musical was nominated for 2007 Helpmann Awards for Best New Australian Work, Best Presentation for Children and Best Costume Design.
