= Cheryl Barker =

Australian operatic soprano (born 1960)

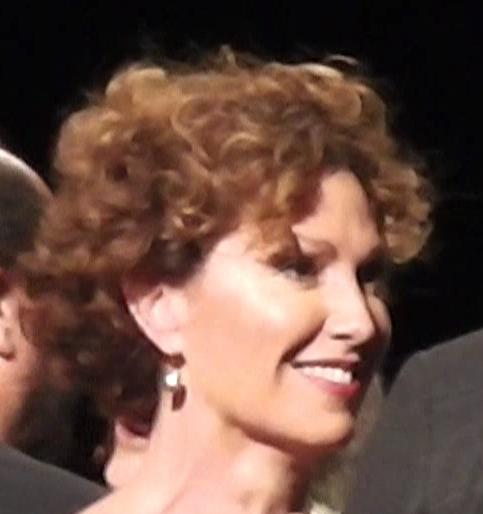
Cheryl Barker, 2013

Cheryl Ruth Barker AO (born 22 April 1960, Sydney) is an Australian operatic soprano who has had an active international career since the late 1980s. She has sung on several complete opera recordings with Chandos Records, including the title roles in Dvořák's Rusalka, Janáček's Káťa Kabanová and Puccini's Madama Butterfly, and Emilia Marty in Janáček's The Makropulos Case. She has also made two solo recordings of opera arias, one with the London Philharmonic Orchestra under conductor David Parry and the other with Orchestra Victoria and conductor Richard Bonynge. On the stage she has had partnerships with the English National Opera (ENO) and Opera Australia.

== Career ==
Barker studied with Dame Joan Hammond at the Victorian College of the Arts and began her career as a member of the opera chorus at the Victoria State Opera at the age of 19. She made her first solo appearance at that house as Blondchen in Mozart's Die Entführung aus dem Serail at the age of 23.

In 1984, Barker moved with her husband, baritone Peter Coleman-Wright, to London, so that he could assume his new position as a member of the choir at the Glyndebourne Festival. Two weeks after their arrival, Barker auditioned for and was accepted as a member of the opera chorus at the Welsh National Opera. She stayed there for the next year and a half, occasionally substituting for ailing singers in larger parts and performing the occasional comprimario role in addition to singing in the chorus.

In 1986, Barker was awarded the Dame Mabel Brookes Fellowship and was a finalist in the Metropolitan Opera National Council Auditions. These accolades helped her to launch a solo career with minor opera companies during the late 1980s. She performed the roles of Marzelline in Fidelio and Cherubino in The Marriage of Figaro with the English Touring Opera. In 1989 she won the Royal Over-Seas League Competition in London. Her first major critical success came in 1990 at her debut at the Sydney Opera House as Mimì in Puccini's La bohème, directed by Baz Luhrmann.

Since the early 1990s Barker has been a regular performer with all of the major opera companies in Australia. With the State Opera of South Australia she has sung Blondchen and Mimì. At the Victoria State Opera she has appeared as Antonia in The Tales of Hoffmann, the First Lady in The Magic Flute, and Mimì. She has portrayed Tatyana in Eugene Onegin at the Lyric Opera of Queensland and Cio-Cio San in Madama Butterfly with Auckland Opera. With Opera Australia she has performed Countess Almaviva in The Marriage of Figaro, Cio-Cio San, Desdemona in Otello, Emilia Marty in The Makropulos Affair, Lauretta in Gianni Schicchi, Marie/Mariette in the Australian premiere, directed by Bruce Beresford, of Die tote Stadt, the Marschallin in Der Rosenkavalier, Marzelline in Fidelio, Nedda in Pagliacci, and the title roles in Arabella, Manon Lescaut, Salome and Suor Angelica.

In 2011, Barker sang the title role in Opera Queensland's production of Tosca, a role she had portrayed before in London (2002) and Sydney (2005). After withdrawing from a 2010 production of Tosca by Opera Australia, she sang this role for the second half of Opera Australia's production in August 2013. Later that year, she reprised the role of Desdemona with Opera Queensland.

Barker's appearances with the English National Opera include Donna Elvira in Don Giovanni, the Foreign Princess in Rusalka, The Governess and Miss Jessel in The Turn of the Screw, Oksana in Christmas Eve, Musetta, Tosca, and the title role in Richard Strauss's Salome.

As a guest artist Barker has appeared at the Dutch National Opera (Cio-Cio San, Emilia Marty), the Royal Opera, London (Jenifer in The Midsummer Marriage), the Scottish Opera (Adina in L'elisir d'amore, Annius in La clemenza di Tito, and Tatyana), the Vlaamse Opera (Suor Angelica, Liù in Turandot), and the Welsh National Opera (Káťa Kabanová). In 2004 she portrayed Sarah Miles in the world premiere of Jake Heggie's The End of the Affair at the Houston Grand Opera with her husband Peter Coleman-Wright as her role-husband and Teddy Tahu Rhodes as her lover. In 2009 she sang Cio-Cio San for her first appearance with the Paris Opera.

The inaugural Australian cruise of the performing arts on the MS Radiance of the Seas in November 2014 included Barker as well as, among others, David Hobson, Colin Lane, Teddy Tahu Rhodes, Simon Tedeschi, Elaine Paige, Marina Prior, and Jonathon Welch.

The Australian premiere of Brett Dean's opera Hamlet at the 2018 Adelaide Festival featured Barker as Gertrude.

From 2020, Barker with Peter Coleman-Wright became co-directors of Pacific Opera, a vehicle for nurturing new talent. For its first performance in 2026, Spirit of Italy, Pacific Opera Studio presented works from the Palestrina to the modern day sung by eleven new Young Artists at Estonian House, Surry Hills, Sydney.

== Personal life ==
Barker has one son, Gabriel, with her husband Peter Coleman-Wright. The couple first performed together in a high school production of The Boy Friend at Belmont High, Geelong. Since then, they have performed together in several productions: Tosca (2002, ENO and 2005, Opera Australia), The End of the Affair (2004, Houston Grand Opera), Arabella (2008, Opera Australia, Sydney Opera House and State Theatre (Melbourne)), concert recitals (2008 in Sydney with Piers Lane, 2012 in Melbourne), and a semi-staged performance of Kiss Me, Kate at QPAC in Brisbane. In 2021, Barker sang Juno in Neil Armfield's production of Rameau's Platée for Pinchgut Opera opposite Coleman-Wright's Jupiter. They returned to QPAC in 2022 with a recital of mainly Lieder and mélodie's, "A LifeTogether in Songs". In 2025, the couple sang in Leonard Bernstein's two-hander, Trouble in Tahiti at the Eternity Playhouse, Sydney.

== Discography ==
- 2001: Madam Butterfly (Puccini, sung in English) Philharmonia Orchestra, Yves Abel; Chandos
- 2002: Persuasion & Seduction, Tasmanian Symphony Orchestra, Martin André; with Peter Coleman-Wright; ABC Classics
- 2003: Puccini = Passion State Orchestra of Victoria, Richard Bonynge; Melba Recordings
- 2003: Quo Vadis (George Dyson), Royal Welsh College Chamber Choir, BBC National Chorus of Wales, Richard Hickox; with Jean Rigby, Philip Langridge, Roderick Williams; Chandos
- 2003: Madama Butterfly, Dutch National Opera, Netherlands Philharmonic Orchestra, Edo de Waart; directed by Robert Wilson; Kultur Video
- 2007: The Makropulos Case (Janáček, sung in English), English National Opera, Charles Mackerras; Chandos
- 2007: Káťa Kabanová (Janáček, sung in English) Welsh National Opera, Carlo Rizzo; Chandos
- 2008: Rusalka (Dvořák, sung in Czech) Live Australian Opera, Richard Hickox; with Bruce Martin, Anne-Marie Owens, Rosario La Spina; Chandos
- 2009: Great Operatic Arias, Vol. 21; Chandos
- 2011: Don John of Austria (Isaac Nathan) Live Sydney Symphony Orchestra, Alexander Briger; Deutsche Grammophon
- 2011: Pure Diva: Tribute to Joan Hammond; Melba Recordings

Additionally, Barker is represented on several opera compilations albums, e.g. on some of ABC Classic FM's Classic 100 Countdown collections.

== Honours ==
In 2008, Barker and her husband were awarded honorary doctorates from the University of Melbourne. In the 2015 Queen's Birthday Honours, Barker was appointed an Officer of the Order of Australia, as was her husband.

Barker and her husband were appointed artistic directors of Pacific Opera, Sydney, in 2020.

=== Australian Women in Music Awards ===
The Australian Women in Music Awards is an annual event that celebrates outstanding women in the Australian Music Industry who have made significant and lasting contributions in their chosen field. They commenced in 2018.

| Year | Nominee / work | Award | Result |
|---|---|---|---|
| 2025 | Cheryl Barker | Excellence in Classical Music Award | Nominated |

=== Helpmann Awards ===
The Helpmann Awards is an awards show, celebrating live entertainment and performing arts in Australia, presented by industry group Live Performance Australia since 2001. Note: 2020 and 2021 were cancelled due to the COVID-19 pandemic.

| Year | Nominee / work | Award | Result | Ref. |
|---|---|---|---|---|
| 2005 | Cheryl Barker – Tosca | Helpmann Award for Best Female Performer in an Opera | Nominated | |
| 2007 | Cheryl Barker – Rusalka | Best Female Performer in an Opera | Nominated | |
| 2008 | Cheryl Barker – Arabella | Best Female Performer in an Opera | Won | |
| 2009 | Cheryl Barker – The Makropoulos Secret | Best Female Performer in an Opera | Nominated | |
| 2013 | Cheryl Barker – Salome | Best Female Performer in an Opera | Won | |
