= Takesha Meshé Kizart =

American operatic soprano (born 1982)

Takesha Meshé Kizart (born 1982) is an African-American operatic soprano. She is a grand-niece of Muddy Waters on her mother's side and a distant relative of Tina Turner.

== Biography ==
Born in Chicago, Kizart studied at the University of North Texas and the Academy of Vocal Arts in Philadelphia. In her first performance in Germany, and her professional debut, she sang the Duchess in Thomas Adès' Powder Her Face at the Musikfest in Bremen, Germany, in 2006. She later returned to Germany for opera roles and concerts on many stages. in 2009, she sang the lead role in Gotham Chamber Opera's stage premiere of Haydn's opera L'isola disabitata. She made her debut with Opera Australia in 2010 in the title role of Tosca, for which she was nominated for the Helpmann Award for Best Female Performer in an Opera. Later that year, she made her Metropolitan Opera debut as Musetta in La bohème.

== Discography ==
- Puccini La bohème Takesha Meshé Kizart (Mimì), Ji-Min Park (Rodolfo), conducted Lü Shao-chia. Opera Australia CD and DVD
- Ottorino Respighi: Marie Victoire, Takesha Meshé Kizart (title role) conducted Michail Jurowski, Deutsche Oper Berlin, CPO 2012
