= Kookaburra Musical Theatre =

Australian not-for-profit theatre company

Peter Cousens' Kookaburra: The National Musical Theatre Company was an Australian not-for-profit theatre company dedicated to musical theatre.

== History ==
Kookaburra was founded by Australian musical theatre performer Peter Cousens in 2006 and received high-profile support from many luminaries of the Australian stage, the Australian Federal government and a variety of businesses. Throughout its short career it produced seven musicals, two major concerts and fourteen cabaret events.

The company experienced financial challenges and caused controversy when Stephen Sondheim demanded an apology and threatened to remove rights after cuts were made to Company when an actor could not perform. It officially closed in March 2009, reportedly $1.6 million in debt. Cousens credited the company's downfall to the 2008 financial crisis.

== Productions ==
- Pippin (Sydney Theatre, 2007)
- Company (Theatre Royal, 2007) - nominated for Best Musical at the 2008 Helpmann Awards
- Tell Me on a Sunday (Seymour Centre and tour, 2008)
- Little Women (Seymour Centre, 2008)
- The Emperor's New Clothes (NSW Schools Tour)
- Songs for a New World (NSW Schools Tour)
- I Love You, You're Perfect, Now Change (NSW Tour)
