= Lise Lindstrom =

American opera singer

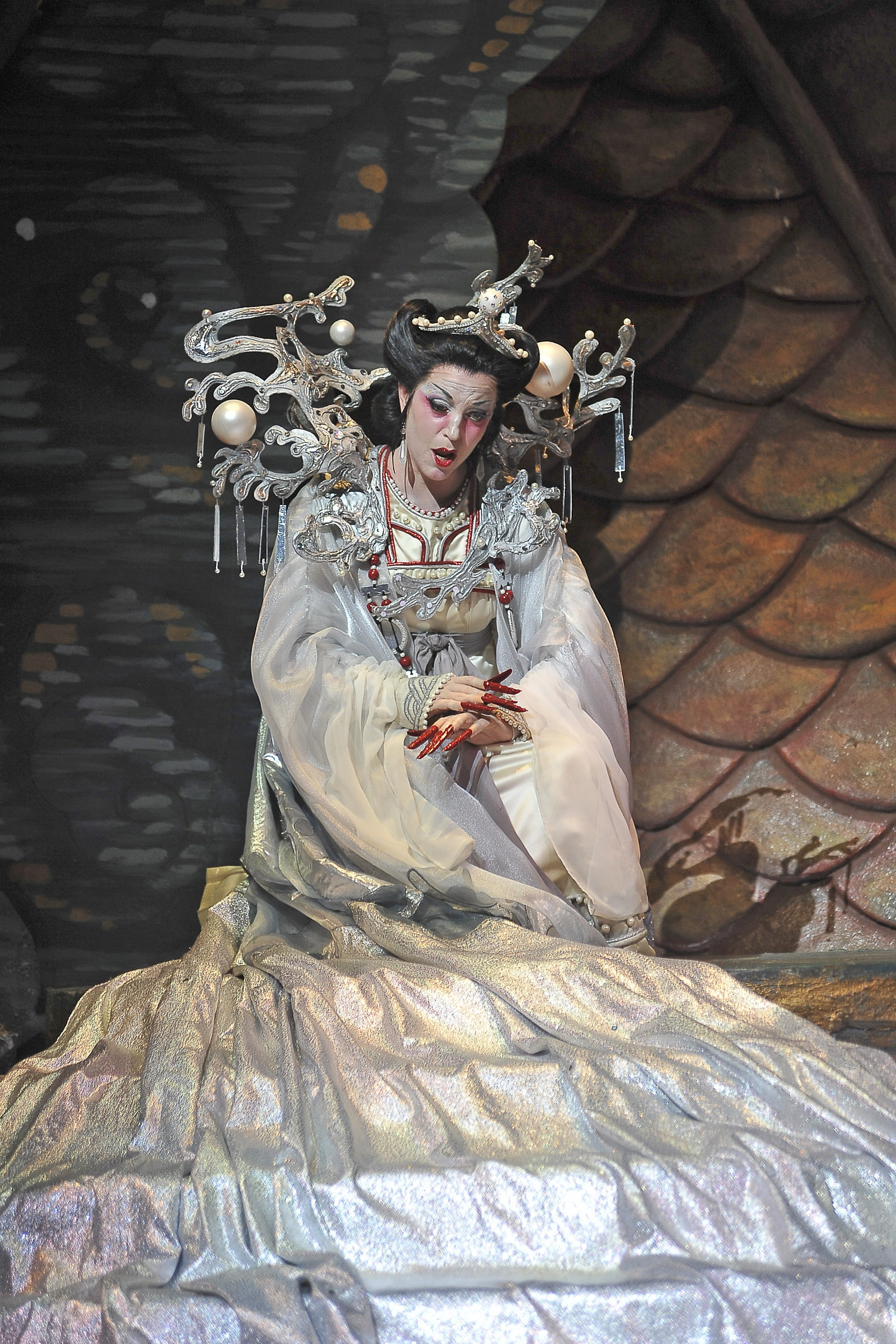
Lindstrom as Turandot, Florida Grand Opera 2010

Lise Lindstrom is an American operatic soprano. She is best known for the title role of Puccini's Turandot and also highly recognized in the dramatic repertory of Richard Strauss and Richard Wagner.

== Early life ==
Lindstrom, whose grandfather was a Norwegian immigrant from Stavanger, was born in Alameda, California. She moved to Sonora, where she was raised, when she was 5. After graduating from Sonora High School, she entered San Francisco State University from which she graduated with bachelor of arts degree. During the time, she took additional voice lessons with Blanche Thebom and sang her first onstage role, Donna Anna in Don Giovanni with the Berkeley Opera alongside her father as the Commendatore. Lindstrom proceeded to musical studies at the San Francisco Conservatory of Music and earned the degree in 1995. After graduation she moved to New York City, managing to make a living by taking temporary jobs while auditioning for agency and artist programs, which made little success.

== Career ==
Lindstrom finally launched her career in 2003 when contacted by Jerome Shannon, then General Director of Mobile Opera, to perform the title role of Turandot.

She came to prominence when she replaced Maria Guleghina as Turandot in November 2009, making her the Metropolitan Opera debut.

Lindstrom made her role debut in the title role of August Everding's 2015 production of Richard Strauss's Elektra at the Hamburg State Opera with Simone Young conducting. At the same house, she debuted in 2017 as Die Färberin in Strauss's Die Frau ohne Schatten under the baton of Kent Nagano. 2016 saw her role debut as Brünnhilde in Opera Australia's 2016 production of the Ring Cycle. In 2017, she debuted at the Theater an der Wien as Marie in Wozzeck.
