= Roger Kirk (designer) =

Australian costume designer

Roger Kirk AM is an Australian costume designer primarily for stage and film. He won the Tony Award for Best Costume Design and the Drama Desk Award for Outstanding Costume Design for The King and I and was nominated for 42nd Street.

Kirk began his career in television in Australia, working as a stagehand and floor manager in the Sydney ABC studios, and next worked in the West End for three years doing props. Upon returning to Australia, he worked in the costume department at ABC, and then did the costumes for the stage musical Chicago.

Kirk designs costumes for stage musicals, most recently for the musical King Kong. He has also worked in the 2006 arena production of The Boy From Oz. He designed sets for Elton John's 1986 Australian tour, sets and costumes for the Australian TV version of Gladiators, and awards shows such as the Australian Film Institute. In 1992 his evening wear designs were on the international catwalks in London, Spain and New York as part of the Australian Fashion Framework. His work for opera includes the costumes for the Victoria State Opera production of Manon in 1997.

== Stage work (selected) ==
- Jesus Christ Superstar (revival, 2000)
- The King and I (Australia, 1991; Broadway, 1996; West End, 2000; Millburn, 2002; US tour, 2004)
- 42nd Street (revival, 2001)
