= James Cundall =

English theatre producer (born 1957)

James Cundall MBE
- Born: 1957 (age 68–69); Sherburn, England

James William Thomas Cundall MBE is a British theatrical producer notable for his association with many commercially successful musicals and theatrical shows. He is a founder of Lunchbox Theatrical Productions and The Imperial Ice Stars, conceived York's annual Christmas ice-rink The Ice Factor and created York's Shakespeare's Rose Theatre.

In 2019 his principal company Lunchbox Theatrical Productions Ltd went into administration following the business failure of Shakespeare’s Rose Theatre Ltd, with creditors including the Royal National Theatre claiming unpaid debts of over five million pounds from a series of companies run in different parts of the world by Cundall under the umbrella of Lunchbox Theatrical Productions.

== Early life ==
Cundall was born into a farming family at the foot of the Wolds near Scarborough. He originally qualified as a chartered surveyor and worked for the family firm of estate agents and auctioneers. In 1985 he opened Cundall's estate agents office in York.

Cundall moved to London and a career in finance, where he became Director of Global Asset Management (GAM) and later Chief Executive of the Asian/Japanese business of Rothschild Asset Management.

== Theatrical career ==
In 1992 his work took him to Hong Kong where he and a group of like-minded businessmen decided there was a market for bringing West End musicals to local audiences. There, Cundall founded Lunchbox Theatrical Productions and over the next six years brought many international productions to the city such as Les Misérables and the acclaimed Alegría from Cirque du Soleil.

In 1998 Cundall left the world of finance to help Lunchbox expand its reach to Singapore. In 1999 Cundall moved to Sydney to take up the role of Director of Arts and Entertainment for Australasia with IMG, where he was responsible for over 30 productions in the region during his four-year tenure. (including Cats, Miss Saigon, Cabaret, Chicago, Oliver!, Riverdance, Andrea Bocelli, Shirley Bassey, Ricky Martin, Bryn Terfel and Kiri te Kanawa)

In 2003 James joined International Concert Attractions (ICA) as managing director, a publicly listed company on Australia's stock exchange based in Sydney, where his productions included The Blue Room, The Soweto Gospel Choir, Clive James and Pam Ayres.

That same year Cundall and fellow producer Tony Mercer established The Imperial Ice Stars, an international troupe of former Olympic, World, European and National Championship skaters. The troupe have since successfully toured the world to much acclaim with their productions of The Sleeping Beauty on Ice, Swan Lake on Ice, Cinderella on Ice and The Nutcracker on Ice.

In 2004 Cundall returned to the UK and his home near Malton, where he established the international headquarters of Lunchbox Theatrical Productions, which at its peak had subsidiaries in Australia, New Zealand, Hong Kong and Singapore.

Cundall Produced the Outdoor Opening Ceremony of Expo 2010 in Shanghai China, on behalf of David Atkins Enterprises.

Productions by Lunchbox since 2004 include the musicals The Phantom of the Opera, We Will Rock You, Mamma Mia, West Side Story, Annie, The Music of Andrew Lloyd Webber, Grease and Chitty Chitty Bang Bang; international artists Bryn Terfel, Elaine Paige, Jamie Oliver, Rick Stein, Hale and Pace, Roy Chubby Brown, Anthony Warlow and David Campbell; boutique shows Slava's Snowshow, One Night of Queen, Circus Oz, Potted Potter, Stomp, Abba Mania, Storm and Raise the Red Lantern by the Chinese National Ballet; plays Stuff Happens, The Woman in Black, The Mousetrap, Grumpy Old Women and The 39 Steps; children's shows Barney the Dinosaur, Thomas the Tank Engine, Little Big Club and The Adventures of Peter Rabbit.

In 2018, James was awarded an MBE for services to the entertainment industry in the 2019 New Year Honours list.

In October 2019, following poor attendances at Shakespeare’s Rose Theatre events in both York and Blenheim Palace, Lunchbox Theatrical Productions Ltd was placed in administration, owing over five million pounds to creditors.

== Events ==
The Ice Factor is an annual open air Christmas ice rink in York, England, run by Lunchbox Theatrical Productions. It was first conceived by Cundall in 2005 and was built as a temporary structure at the Eye of York for the Christmas season (mid-November to the New Year). The rink returned to the same place until 2010, when, following objections from HM Courts Service located next to the Eye, it was forced to relocate to the York Designer Outlet.

In 2010 he produced, on behalf of David Atkins Enterprises, the Outdoor Opening Ceremony for the Shanghai World Expo.
