= Susan Bullock =

British soprano (born 1958)

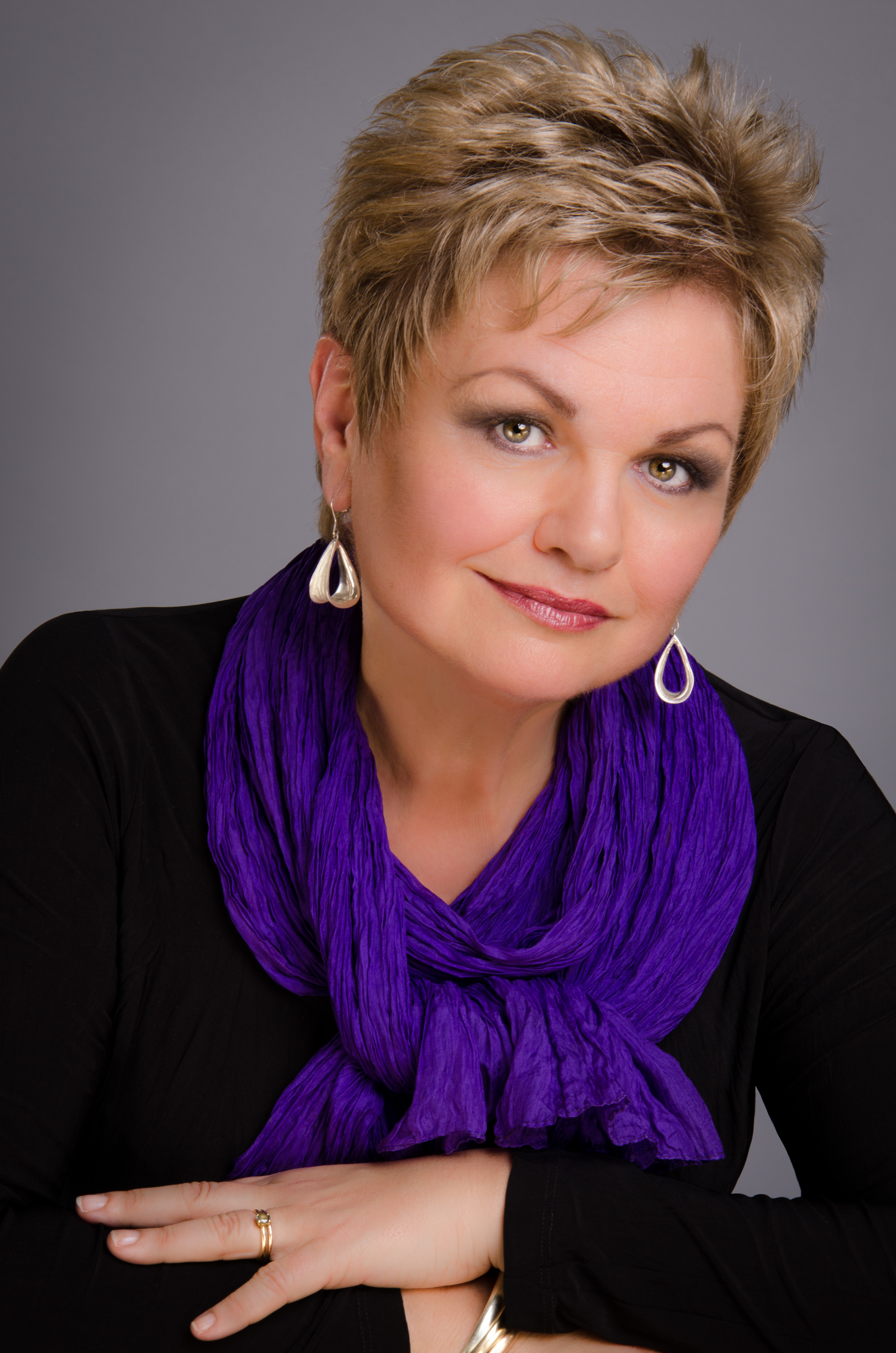
Susan Bullock (2011)

Bullock singing Měsíčku na nebi hlubokém (Song to the Moon) from Rusalka by Antonín Dvořák

Bullock singing the traditional Welsh lullaby Suo Gan

Susan Margaret Bullock CBE (born 9 December 1958 in Cheshire) is a British soprano. She has performed dramatic soprano parts at major opera houses, and also sung in concert and recital.

Bullock was educated at Cheadle Hulme School, and further at Royal Holloway College, University of London, the Royal Academy of Music and the National Opera Studio. She received the 1984 Kathleen Ferrier Award, followed by roles at the English National Opera.

Bullock has a Welsh background and has recorded music in Welsh.

She developed an international career in the mid-1990s as she moved increasingly into late-Romantic and 20th Century German opera repertoire, with engagements at the Frankfurt Opera and Garsington Opera, where she sang Helen in the first British performance of Richard Strauss' Die ägyptische Helena in 1998. Her assumption of Isolde in Wagner's Tristan und Isolde in productions at Opera North, Leeds and the English National Opera confirmed her command of the dramatic soprano repertoire. She sang Brunnhilde in Der Ring des Nibelungen first in Tokyo, and in 2006 performed the role in the first complete Ring cycle by the Canadian Opera Company in their new Toronto opera house.

She made her debut at both La Scala, Milan and the Metropolitan Opera, New York in the title role of Richard Strauss' Elektra. In 2009, she received the Royal Philharmonic Society's award for best singer for her assumption of Elektra in a production at the Royal Opera House, Covent Garden. She had made her Covent Garden debut previously as Marie in Berg's Wozzeck.

She sang Brunnhilde in all performances of Der Ring des Nibelungen at Covent Garden in the London Olympic Year, Autumn 2012. Appearing as Britannia, she sang Always Look on the Bright Side of Life with Eric Idle during the 2012 Summer Olympics closing ceremony. Recordings notably include Richard Strauss' Salome in the Chandos "Opera in English" series conducted Sir Charles Mackerras, and live performances of the Frankfurt Ring cycle, conducted by Sebastian Weigle. Other houses she has sung in include Dresden, Berlin Staatsoper, Teatro Colón (Buenos Aires), Sydney Opera House, La Monnaie (Brussels), Prinzregententheater (Munich), Lisbon and Toulouse. She sings in several languages—her performances include Janáček in Czech, and she has sung contemporary as well as the classical repertoire.

She was the solo soprano at the 2011 Last Night of the Proms on 10 September 2011, performing Brunnhilde's Immolation Scene from Act 3 of Götterdämmerung in Richard Wagner's Ring Cycle, as well as the traditional "Rule, Britannia" and "Land of Hope and Glory".

She was appointed Commander of the Order of the British Empire (CBE) in the 2014 Birthday Honours for services to opera.
