= Chunky Move =

Australian contemporary dance company

Chunky Move is an Australian contemporary dance company from Southbank, Victoria.

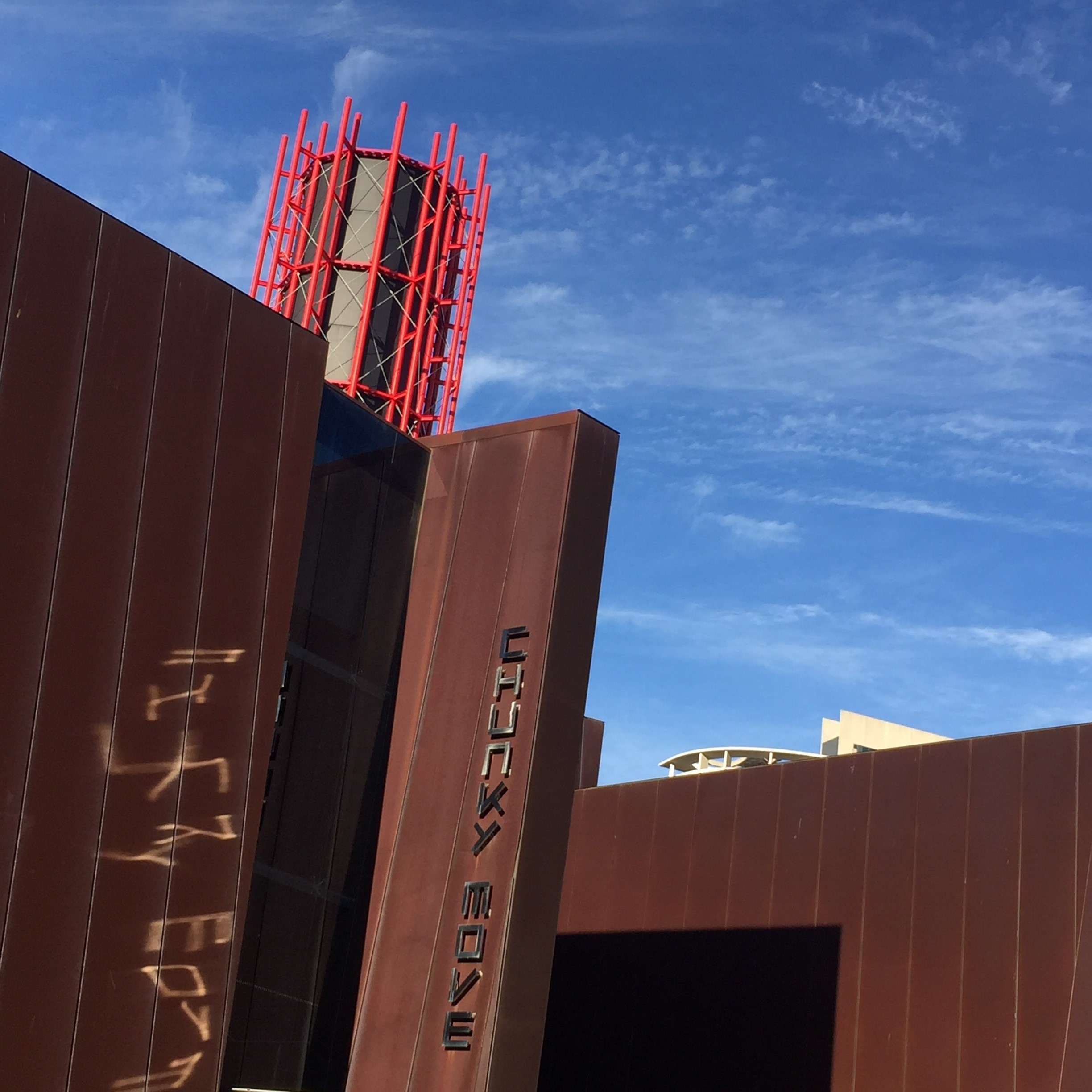
Chunky Move, Southbank, Melbourne

== History ==
Chunky Move was founded in 1995 and debuted at the Melbourne International Arts Festival with artistic director Gideon Obarzanek.

The company's work is diverse and has included stage, new-media and installation works. Chunky Move has toured extensively including the United States of America, Singapore, Hong Kong, France, Germany, Hungary, United Kingdom, Colombia, Japan, Belgium, Canada, and Russia. Reviews of their performances are regularly published in the Village Voice.

== Artistic directors ==
In 2011 Gideon Obarzanek announced that he would be stepping down as artistic director. Anouk van Dijk was announced as the new artistic director, starting her new role in 2012.

In December 2018, Antony Hamilton was appointed artistic director of the company. Since commencing this role in April 2019, the team has been signalling the programming that would be characteristic of Chunky Move's future, including the presentation of Token Armies for Melbourne International Arts Festival 2019.

== Selected works ==
Works include:

- Token Armies (2019) - Antony Hamilton
- Universal Estate (2019) - Antony Hamilton
- Simulcast (2019)
- Next Move 11 (2018)
- Common Ground (2018)
- Accumulation (2018)
- REDSHIFT (2017)
- ANTI—GRAVITY (2017)
- Next Move 9 (works by Jo Lloyd, Nicola Gunn and Melanie Lane, 2016)
- L U C I D (2016)
- Rule of Thirds (2016)
- Depth of Field (2015)
- Miss Universal (2015)
- Complexity of Belonging (2014)
- It Cannot Be Stopped (2014)
- 247 Days (2013)
- Embodiment 1:1:1
- An Act of Now (2012)
- Keep Everything (2012)
- AORTA(choreographed by Stephanie Lake, 2013)
- gentle is the power
- Assembly
- It Sounds Silly (choreographed by Adam Wheeler)
- Connected
- Faker
- Mix Tape (choreographed by Stephanie Lake) awarded 2010 Green Room Award: Best Choreography - Stephanie Lake and 2010 Green Room Award: Best Male Dancer - Timothy Ohl
- Mortal Engine
- Black Marrow (choreographed by Erna Ómarsdóttir and Damien Jalet)
- Glow (2007) using a "sophisticated video tracking system" and "interactive video technologies" with Frieder Weiss's interactive system design
- disagreeable object (choreographed by Michelle Heaven)
- I Like This (choreographed by Antony Hamilton and Byron Perry)
- Dance Like Your Old Man (film)
- Two Faced Bastard
- I Want to Dance Better at Parties (2006)
- Tense Dave (2005) awarded the 2005 Bessie Award for Choreography
- Wanted: ballet for a contemporary democracy
- Closer
- Arcade
- Crumpled
- Corrupted 2
- Connected
