= Queensland Music Festival =

Musical event in Australia

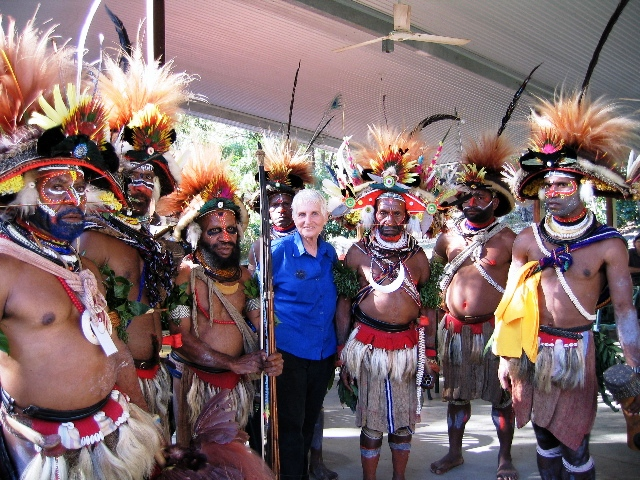
Huli Wigmen; Queensland Music Festival, Cooktown, 2005

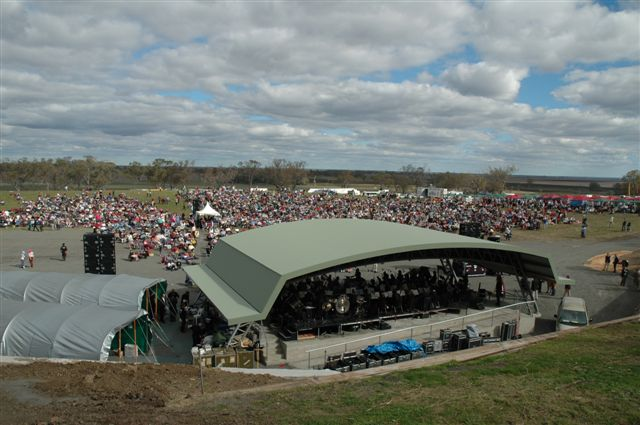
A 2005 performance in Jimbour

The Queensland Music Festival (QMF) is a series of musical events staged in a number of locations in Queensland, Australia, usually around late July, every second year. It is financially supported by the Queensland Government through Arts Queensland, the Brisbane City Council, the Australia Council, and a wide range of other partners. It brings new innovative musical experiences to the far flung communities as well as major cities of Queensland.

Since its inception, Queensland Music Festival has grown from a biennial state-wide festival of music, to a creator of annual festivals and events, producing over 800 live music experiences for the 2019 Festival. By its geography, length, participation and attendance, Queensland Music Festival is the largest live music festival in the world.

== History ==
The festival began as the Brisbane Biennial Festival of Music in 1991 with Anthony Steel as founding artistic director who also directed the 1993 festival. Nicholas Heyward was CEO in 1995 and 1997 with Jonathan Mills and Richard Mills as artistic advisors. In 1999, Claire Booth was appointed the Executive Director, the festival was renamed the Queensland Biennial Festival of Music and the program was extended to include regional Queensland. The artistic director was Simone de Haan in 1999, and Lyndon Terracini from 2001 to 2005. He was succeeded in 2007 by Paul Grabowsky – when the festival was renamed to Queensland Music Festival – and Deborah Conway in 2009 and 2011.

James Morrison was artistic director for 2013 and 2015. Katie Noonan was appointed in 2016 and was Artistic Director for 2017 and 2019.

In 2019, a piece commemorating the re-discovery of a once thought extinct Night Parrot was commissioned for the festival.

== See also ==
- List of Australian music festivals
