= HotHouse Theatre =

HotHouse Theatre is a professional theatre company based in the Albury-Wodonga region on the border of New South Wales and Victoria, Australia.

It evolved from the Murray River Performing Group which was established in 1979.

HotHouse Theatre is resident in the Butter Factory Theatre in Wodonga, and also manages a farmhouse outside Albury for the company's residency programs.
