= West Australian Opera =

Opera company in Western Australia

Coordinates: 31°57′12″S 115°51′15″E

West Australian Opera (WAO) is the principal opera company of Western Australia and is a resident at His Majesty's Theatre, Perth.

It formed in 1967 and works in close association with the West Australian Symphony Orchestra. It presents three main stage productions each year as well as the annual free event, City of Perth's Opera in the Park. The company draws from the principal canon of operatic repertoire and is increasingly involved in the commissioning and development of new operas. It has a strong education program, and is involved with many concerts and community events in metropolitan and regional Western Australia. In July 2012 Joseph Colaneri was appointed Artistic Director and succeeded Richard Mills, who had previously held the post since 1997. Colaneri left the company ahead of its 2015 season, and Brad Cohen was subsequently appointed as artistic director.

The current Artistic Director, since 2019, is Christopher van Tuinen. The current chairman is Terry Bowen and the principal partner of the company is Wesfarmers Arts.

== History ==
The West Australian Opera was founded in 1967.

In 1997 Richard Mills was appointed artistic director of the company. In 2007, to celebrate the 40th anniversary of the company, Mills composed The Love of the Nightingale and its world premiere was staged by WAO.

In October 2014, the company and its general manager, Carolyn Chard, attracted controversy in the media in Australia and abroad for its decision to embargo Carmen from its program for the next two years because of a A$400,000 sponsorship over two years by Healthway, a Government of Western Australia body established to reduce smoking and to work towards a smoke-free Western Australia. It is Healthway's policy that "smoking is not to be portrayed during any performances under the control of the sponsored organisation e.g. theatre, film and other performing arts." Australia's prime minister Tony Abbott, state premier Colin Barnett and state health minister Kim Hames criticised the decision as "political correctness gone crazy".

In 2015, WAO held the world premiere of Kate Miller-Heidke's opera The Rabbits, after John Marsden's and Shaun Tan's picture book.

In 2017, WAO and the UWA School of Music signed a Memorandum of Understanding that explores Masterclasses, workshops and performance opportunities for the professional development of musicians, as well as the development of postgraduate qualifications to be offered jointly.
