= Windmill Theatre Co =

Theatre company for young audiences

- Industry: Theatre
- Founded: 2002
- Headquarters: Adelaide, Australia
- Key people: Clare Watson (artistic director); Kaye Weeks (executive producer)
- Products: Productions
- Website: windmill.org.au

Windmill Theatre Co (previously known as Windmill Performing Arts), is an Australian children's theatre company in Adelaide, South Australia. Established in 2002 as a South Australian Government initiative, it is Australia's flagship professional theatre company for child and young adult audiences. As of 2025 artistic director is Clare Watson. Windmill Pictures, dedicated to screen productions, was formed in 2017, headed by Rosemary Myers.

== History ==
Windmill Performing Arts was established in 2001 by the South Australian Government under the Public Corporations (Australian Children's Performing Arts Company) Regulations 2001, which was superseded by the 2016 Regulations.

The founding director and creative producer was Cate Fowler. The founding patron was children's author Mem Fox.

In 2007, executive producer Kaye Weeks and artistic director Rosemary Myers first came on board. The company has experienced enormous growth and success since then.

== Productions and growth ==
Windmill performs a season in Adelaide each year, with shows also touring through regional South Australia and elsewhere in Australia. Windmill have also toured internationally, performing in many countries, including in the US (including Off-Broadway), New Zealand, United Kingdom, Singapore and South Korea. It has grown substantially in recent years: in 2014, the company toured to four cities, presenting a total of 144 live performances; in 2018, the number of live performances had increased to 234, and the number of cities and towns visited increased eightfold, to 34.

The company was behind the multi-award-winning film Girl Asleep, including the 2016 CinefestOz best film, adapted from its stage production. The following year a new arm of the company, Windmill Pictures, was launched in order to develop further screen projects.

== Description and governance ==
Windmill Theatre Company is based at Adelaide College of the Arts on Light Square, Adelaide, South Australia. Its screen production arm, Windmill Pictures, develops films made from the live theatre repertoire.

=== Key people ===
As of July 2025, Clare Watson is artistic director of the Windmill Theatre Company, while Rosemary Myers is artistic director of Windmill Pictures. Kaye Weeks is executive producer of both arms.

Richard Harris chairs the board.

== Funding ==
Arts SA was responsible for the state funding arrangements until Windmill was transferred to the Department of Education in 2018 by the Marshall government.

In July 2019, the state budget slashed funding to the History Trust of South Australia, Carclew, Patch Theatre Company and Windmill, as part of "operational efficiency" cuts.

Under the Albanese government's new arts policy, a major new project, Mama Does Derby, a comedy co-created by Clare Watson and Virginia Gay, was funded in July 2025 by the Creative Futures Fund.

== Awards and nominations ==
The company has been nominated for and won many awards.
