= Iltja Ntjarra Many Hands Art Centre =

Australian Aboriginal institution in Alice Springs

Iltja Ntjarra Many Hands Art Centre, or Many Hands Art Centre, is an Aboriginal owned and directed art centre based in Alice Springs, Northern Territory, Australia and it is home to, and has a special focus on supporting, the Hermannsburg School; the best known artist of which was Albert Namatjira. It was established in 2004 by the Ngurratjuta/Pmara Ntjarra Aboriginal Coprporation as a place for Arrernte artists to come together to "paint, share and learn new techniques". The centre is also strongly committed to improving the economic participation of its artists, ethical work practices and returning the greatest possible percentage of sales to the artist.

== History ==
Albert Namatjira was one of the first famous Aboriginal artists and, having learned watercolour techniques from Rex Battarbee, he held his first exhibition in 1938 and had become a household name in Australia by the 1960s and is arguably one of the most famous artists of the 20th century. Namatjira taught his children, and other relatives, to paint in his unique style and these skills continue to be passed on and continue to receive international acclaim. By continuing the legacy of Namatjira the Iltja Ntjarra artists sustain an important piece of living history.

== Artists ==
Many hands artists include:

- Aaron Kingsley
- Benita Clement
- Betty Namatjira Wheeler Naparula
- Clare Inkamala
- Dellina Inkamala
- Doris Inkamala
- Georgie Kentiltja
- Gloria Pannka
- Gwenda Namatjira Nungarayi
- Hilary Wirri
- Hergert Pareroultja
- Ivy Pareroultja
- Janie Karpa
- Jeffrey Waku
- Johannes Katakarinja
- Kathleen France
- Kathy Inkamala
- Kevin Namatjira
- Lenie Namatkira
- Marcus Wheeler
- Marie Abbott / Ramjohn
- Mervyn Rubuntja
- Narina Meneri
- Noreen Hudson
- Peter Tjutjatja
- Reinhold Inkamala
- Ricky Connick Jakamara
- Selma Coulthard Nunay
- Sophia Inkamala
- Stanley Ebatarinja
- Steven Walbungara
- Therese Ryder
- Vanessa Inkamala
- Wilfred Kentilja

== See also ==
- Namatjira Project
