= Trevor Jamieson =

Australian actor, singer, dancer and playwright

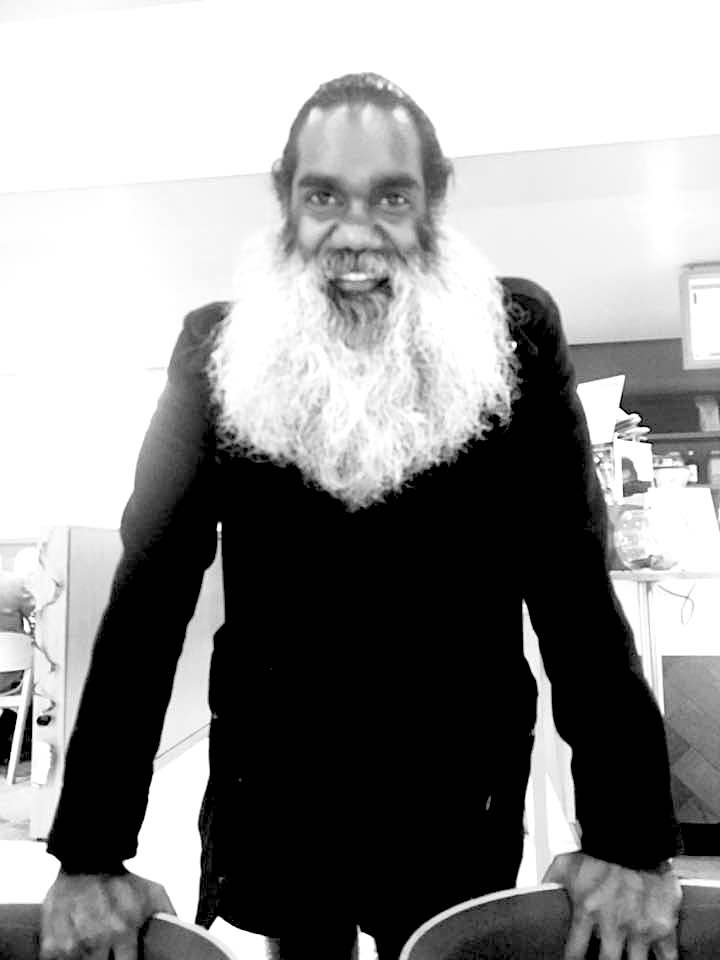
- Born: 7 March 1975 (age 51); Subiaco, Western Australia, Australia
- Occupation: Actor
- Years active: 1994–present
- Relatives: Natasha Wanganeen (cousin)
- Awards: Deadly Awards 2008: Most Outstanding Achievement in Film, TV or Theatre for Ngapartji Ngapartji; Sydney Theatre Awards 2008, Best Actor in a Lead Role 2008

Trevor Jamieson (born 7 March 1975) is an Aboriginal Australian stage and film actor, playwright, dancer, singer and didgeridoo player.

== Early life ==
Trevor Jamieson was born on 7 March 1975 in Subiaco, Western Australia (WA).

He grew up in the Western Australian Goldfields region, mostly around Kalgoorlie, Esperance, and Norseman, but his people are mostly of the Central Desert, in particular Nullarbor and Maralinga. He has links to Pitjantjara (on his father's side), Kukatja, and other groups, including the Noongar peoples of south-western WA (on his mother's side). His mother was removed from his grandmother by missionaries soon after birth, so as a child he learnt more about his father's side. His father and his grandfather were policemen.

His aunt, Lynette Narkle, is the niece of playwright Jack Davis, so he was exposed to drama at an early age, and enjoyed being in a play at school. Thinking about signing up as a constable at the end of 1992, Markle persuaded him to go for an audition, which led to the first step in his career - a role in the stage musical Bran Nue Dae, which toured nationally.

He is a cousin of South Australian actress Natasha Wanganeen and an uncle of actor Clarence Ryan, whom he met while filming Lockie Leonard, where they play father and son.

== Career ==
Jamieson is an actor, dancer, singer, playwright, and didgeridoo player.

=== Stage ===
Jamieson's first stage performance was in the touring producing of Bran Nue Dae in 1993. In 1994 he acted in Wild Cat Falling at the Downstairs Theatre at the Belvoir in Sydney. In 1996 he was in Corrugation Road, another musical by Jimmy Chi, this time set in a mental hospital.

He co-wrote The Career Highlights of the MAMU with Scott Rankin, staged in 2002. This was a dramatisation of the impact of the British nuclear testing at Maralinga, South Australia between 1956 and 1963 on the Indigenous Australians in the region, who were known as the Spinifex people. A video recording was made of the production performed by Black Swan Theatre Company at the Kampnagel theatre in Hamburg, Germany in August 2002. The play was directed by Andrew Ross of Black Swan, and performed at the 2002 Adelaide Festival and the Octagon Theatre at the University of Western Australia (UWA) in May–June 2002, before touring to Mandurah, Margaret River, and Esperance.

He was co-creator of Ngapartji Ngapartji, with Big hART's creative director Scott Rankin. This was a language revitalisation and community development project started in 2005 and which developed into a stage performance as an offshoot. In the theatrical production, Jamieson narrates his family's story. It was performed at the Sydney Opera House and evolved over the years, with performances around the country with changes of cast and script.Ngapartji Ngapartji has toured Australia extensively in between 2005 and 2008 with the show undergoing various developments throughout its production history. In 2012, the show was revived in Canberra in a condensed version under the name Ngapartji Ngapartji One, but Jamieson was not in the cast that year as he was touring with another Big hART production, Namatjira.

In 2012–13 Jamieson played the artist Albert Namatjira in Namatjira, in a performance that was another offshoot of a community project by Big hART, written and directed by Scott Rankin. The play was seen by over 48,000 Australians at its performances at Belvoir and Riverside Theatre Parramatta (Sydney), Malthouse Theatre in Melbourne, and many other theatres on its regional tour of New South Wales, Victoria, South Australia and Tasmania, before touring to London, where it played at the Southbank Centre in November. The play won the 2012 Helpmann Award for Best Regional Touring Production.

In 2013 he took the role of Fingerbone Bill in a stage production of Storm Boy by Barking Gecko Theatre Company and Sydney Theatre Company, based on the 1964 novel by Colin Thiele.

In 2014, Jamieson worked with the Black Arm Band theatre company in a musical theatre production called Dirtsong which closed the 2014 Adelaide Festival on 16 March 2014. The performers, who included Jamieson, Archie Roach, Lou Bennett, Emma Donovan and many other singers and musicians, sang songs with lyrics by writer Alexis Wright, with some sung in Aboriginal languages. The performance included both contemporary and traditional songs, and had premiered five years earlier at the 2009 Melbourne International Arts Festival, with Jamieson not in the original cast.

In 2016, Jamieson participated in a multicultural dance presentation, along with Indian dancers Isha Shavani and Tao Issaro, other Aboriginal dancers, and Maori dancers. The performance was called Kaya, meaning "hello", and it toured regional WA, including Kalgoorlie, before premiering in Perth at the Dolphin Theatre at UWA.

In May 2022 Jamieson played Dugald in a revival of the opera Voss, a co-production by State Opera South Australia and Victorian Opera. Originally scheduled to be performed in Melbourne in August 2021, owing to a COVID-19 pandemic lockdown, the season was cancelled and rescheduled to a single performance at the Adelaide Festival Theatre. The production was well-reviewed, with two critics giving it four out of five stars.

Jameieson acted in the 2013 and 2016 productions of Andrew Bovell's The Secret River. For the 2017 production at Anstey Hill Quarry for the Adelaide Festival, he arranged the music. The co-production of the State Theatre Company of South Australia and the Sydney Theatre Company, co-directed by Neil Armfield and Geordie Brookman. was a record-breaking success, playing to full houses over 18 nights.

Jamieson's performance in Jada Alberts' Brothers Wreck (2016) was praised. The topic (Indigenous youth suicide) was one for which Jamieson could draw on his own life experiences.

=== Film and TV ===
In 2009, an episode of Message Stick on ABC Television, called "Spinifex Man", was aired. Filmmaker Allan Collins talks to Jamieson about his life and work in the program.

Jamieson portrayed Fingerbone Bill in the 2019 film Storm Boy, released on 17 January 2019. He loved the 1976 film and especially idolised David Gulpilil (who played Fingerbone Bill), so playing the character in both the stage version in 2013 and this film was a dream come true for him. He consulted Ngarrindjeri / Kaurna elder Moogy Sumner on the singing, dancing, and other cultural protocols, and worked with a Ngarrindjeri linguist to get the language right, as he was representing Ngarrindjeri people in the film, which was shot on Ngarrindjeri country. (Note: Sumner often represents Kaurna people too.)

== Other roles ==
In 2021, Jamieson was an ambassador for the Revelation Perth International Film Festival.

== Filmography ==
=== Film ===
Year	Title	Role	Notes
2002	Rabbit-Proof Fence	Moore River Policeman	Feature film
2006	Weewar	Weewar	Short film
2007	Done Dirt Cheap	Amos	Short film
2009	3 Acts of Murder	Lary Dooley	TV movie
2009	Bran Nue Dae	Roebuck Hotel Dancer / Listen to the News Dancer	Feature film
2013	Around the Block	Uncle Rex	Feature film
2016	Boys in the Trees	Man in white	Feature film
2018	Kwongkan Sand	Elder	Feature film
2018	Yulubidyi - Until The End	Thunder / Mamu	Short film
2018	Thalu: Dreamtime is Now	Mingkala (voice)	Feature film
2019	Storm Boy	Fingerbone Bill	Feature film
2019	A Small Punch in a Little Town	Warragul	Feature film
2023	Run Rabbit Run	Sandy	Feature film
2024	Just a Farmer	Pat	Feature Film

=== Television ===
Year	Title	Role	Notes
1994	Heartland	Nobby	2 episodes
1998	Kings in Grass Castles	Boontamurra Youth	Miniseries 2 episodes
2009	The Circuit	Bill	1 episode
2007-2010	Lockie Leonard	Rev. Egg	36 episodes
2011	My Place	Father	1 episode
2015	The Secret River	Grey Beard (Gumang)	Miniseries, 2 episodes
2016	Cleverman	Uncle Max	5 episodes
2018	Black Comedy	Guest cast	5 episodes

== Stage ==
Year	Title	Role	Notes
1991	Honey Pot	Cousin William	Esperance, WA
1993	Bran Nue Dae	Willie	Playhouse, Melbourne with Melbourne Theatre Company, Regal Theatre, Perth with Black Swan State Theatre Company
1994	Wild Cat Falling		Belvoir Street Theatre
1995	Subi Shorts Program 1: Family Running for Mr Whippy / The Price of Prayer / Darling Oscar		Subiaco Theatre Centre, Perth with Black Swan State Theatre Company
1995	Subi Shorts Program 2: Great Debbil Dingo / Buried / Slam Dunk		Subiaco Theatre Centre, Perth with Black Swan State Theatre Company
1996–98	Corrugation Road	Barry	Canberra Theatre for National Festival of Australian Theatre, Fairfax Studio, Melbourne for Melbourne International Arts Festival, Subiaco Theatre Centre, Perth, Playhouse Adelaide, Playhouse Theatre, Perth, Monash University with Black Swan State Theatre Company
1997	The Merry-Go-Round in the Sea	Mrs Vinegar / Les / Reg	Subiaco Theatre Centre, Perth with Black Swan State Theatre Company
1999	King for this Place	Don	Deck Chair Theatre
2000	Plainsong		Black Swan State Theatre Company
2000–02	Crying Baby		Darwin Festival with Marrugeku Theatre Co, Quarry Amphitheatre, Perth, Earagail Arts Festival, Donegal, Ireland, Holland, Belgium, Technology Park, Sydney for Sydney Festival with Stalker Theatre Company
2002	The Career Highlights of the MAMU	Writer	Dunstan Playhouse, Adelaide with Black Swan State Theatre Company for Adelaide Festival, Kampnagel theatre in Hamburg, Germany, Octagon Theatre at the University of Western Australia, Mandurah, Margaret River, and Esperance, Western Australia.
2004	Yandy	Storyteller	Octagon Theatre, Perth with Black Swan State Theatre Company
2006	Anangu Backyard		Adelaide Arts Centre with Big hART
2006–09	Ngapartji Ngapartji	Narrator / Creator	Fairfax Studio, Melbourne, Sydney Opera House, Playhouse Theatre, Perth, Dreaming Festival Site, Woodford, Artspace, Adelaide, Belvoir Street Theatre, Ernabella, Araluen Arts Centre, Alice Springs, Space Theatre, Adelaide with Big hART
2008	Salamanca		Broome, WA with Stalker Theatre Company
2007	Long Black Lab workshop		
2009–10	Nyuntu Ngali (You We Two)	Petrol (Narrator)	Space Theatre, Adelaide, Wharf 2 Theatre, Sydney with Windmill Performing Arts & Sydney Theatre Company
2009	Burning Daylight		Goolarri Outdoor Venue, Broome, Perth Institute of Contemporary Arts, Carriageworks, Arts House Meat Market, Melbourne, Salamanca Arts Centre, Hobart with Marrugeku Company & Stalker Theatre Company
2010–11	Waltzing the Wilarra	Charlie	Subiaco Arts Centre, Perth with Yirra Yaakin Noongar Theatre
2010–13	Namatjira	Albert Namatjira	Belvoir Street Theatre Sydney, Riverside Theatre Parramatta, Rotterdam, Holland, Malthouse Theatre Melbourne, Canberra Theatre Centre, Theatre North, Launceston, Theatre Royal, Hobart, Adelaide Festival Centre, Australian regional tour & Southbank Centre, London with Big hART
2011	As You Like It	Adam & Duke Senior	Belvoir Street Theatre, Sydney
2012	Ngapartji Ngapartji	Narrator / Creator	Playhouse, Canberra, Canberra Theatre Centre with Big hART
2013	Storm Boy	Fingerbone Bill	Wharf 1 Theatre & Perth with Sydney Theatre Company & Barking Gecko Theatre Company
2013–14	Hipbone Sticking Out	John Pat	Canberra Theatre Centre, Playhouse, Melbourne with Big hART
2013, 2016, 2017	The Secret River	Ngalamalum	Roslyn Packer Theatre with Sydney Theatre Company for Sydney Festival, Playhouse Canberra, His Majesty's Theatre, Perth for Perth Festival, Playhouse QPAC, Brisbane, Anstey Quarry Adelaide for Adelaide Festival
2014	Dirtsong		Black Arm Band for Adelaide Festival
2014	20 Questions	Guest artist	Belvoir Street Theatre, Sydney
2016	Kaya	Dancer	Kalgoorlie, Dolphin Theatre UWA, Perth
2017–18	The Season	Senior Ranger Richard	Sydney Opera House with Sydney Festival, Theatre Royal, Hobart, Malthouse Theatre, Melbourne with Melbourne Festival, Hopgood Theatre Adelaide
2017	Coranderrk	Narrator / Performer	Canberra Theatre Centre with Ilbijerri Theatre Company & Belvoir Theatre Company for NORPA
2018	Brothers Wreck	David, the Counsellor	Odeon Theatre, Adelaide, Malthouse Theatre, Melbourne with STCSA
2020	Jeremy		Online - Australia with STCSA
2020	Max		Online - Australia with STCSA
2022	Voss	Dugald	Festival Theatre, Adelaide with State Opera of South Australia & Victorian Opera

== Awards & nominations ==
Year	Title	Award	Category	Result
2008	Ngapartji Ngapartji	Sydney Theatre Awards	Best Actor in a Lead Role	Won
2008	Ngapartji Ngapartji	Sydney Theatre Awards	Best Mainstage Production	Nominated
2008	Ngapartji Ngapartji	Deadly Awards 2008	Most Outstanding Achievement in Film, TV and Theatre	Won
2008	Ngapartji Ngapartji	Deadly Awards 2008	Best Script	Nominated
2010	Namatjira	Sydney Theatre Awards	Best Leading Man	Nominated
2020	Ayaan	South Australian Screen Awards	Best Male Performance	Won
2020	Ayaan	St Kilda Short Film Festival	Best Actor	Nominated
2021	A Small Punch in a Littie Town	Northern Virginia International Film & Music Festival	Festival Award for Best Acting Ensemble	Nominated
2021	A Small Punch in a Littie Town	Hollywood Dreamz International Film Festival	Outstanding Cast Performance Feature	Nominated
