= Ngapartji Ngapartji =

Australian language revitalisation and community development project 2005 - 2010

Ngapartji Ngapartji was an Australian Indigenous language maintenance/revitalisation and community development project that ran between 2005 and 2010. One of its spin-off projects, a stage production of the same name co-created by Scott Rankin and Trevor Jamieson, toured Australia extensively in between 2005 and 2008.

Ngapartji Ngapartji was produced by the Australian arts and social change company Big hART, and conducted in various locations across the APY lands (South Australia), Central Australia and in Alice Springs (Northern Territory). The project ran from 2005 to 2010, with spin-off projects and related performances. The project was structured around an experimental and reflexive arts-based community development program which included the creation of an online interactive language and culture learning website by Pitjantjatjara-speaking young people, elders and linguists; a bilingual touring theatre work and a media campaign promoting the development of an Australian national Indigenous language policy.

== Objectives ==
Ngapartji Ngapartji's main objective was to effect a sustained positive change in various disadvantaged, struggling Indigenous communities by offering local individuals opportunities to engage with their cultural capital in arts-based practice. Through the creation of art in various forms, Big hART sought to maintain and revitalise the Pitjantjatjara language and thus to preserve cultural knowledge, to improve general literacy levels (defined as both the ability to read and write as well as the ability to engage in a culturally meaningful manner with new media and modern technology) and to promote social cohesion as a crime prevention measure. It was part of the project's aim to "positively [profile] the strength of culture at a time where health and social issues [were] dominating […] media [accounts of the region and its people]".

On a global scale, the project aimed to raise awareness, interest and appreciation of Aboriginal Australian languages in general and to provide a model for Language revitalisation of endangered languages.

== Background ==
Between 1955 and 1963 the British military was given permission to conduct a number of nuclear tests around Maralinga in the South Australian desert. After initially downplaying the environmental and social impacts of those tests, the Australian and UK governments conceded in 1994 to a payment of A$13.5 million in compensation to the local Maralinga Tjarutja people.

The research for a planned theatre show on actor/dancer/singer Trevor Jamieson's family brought him and Big hART's creative director Scott Rankin and producer Alex Kelly to the APY Lands where many of the displaced Maralinga Tjarutja people found shelter. Consultations with community elders and the Jamieson's extended family about the regions' history and contemporary challenges brought forth first ideas about the project's focus and structure. In 2002, the play Career Highlights of the Mamu represented the first stage in the theatrical exploration of the family's story.

== The project ==
The project was conducted in various locations across the Anangu, Pitjantjatjara and Yankunytjatjara (APY) Lands in Central Australia and in Alice Springs. It ran from 2005 to 2010, with spin-off projects and related performances. The project was structured around an experimental and reflexive arts-based community development program which included the creation of an online interactive language and culture learning website by Pitjantjatjara-speaking young people, elders and linguists; a bilingual touring theatre work and a media campaign promoting the development of an Australian national Indigenous language policy.

In 2005, Kelly moved to Alice Springs and started to establish further contacts with community members, organisations and institutions across the APY Lands. The objective of this early stage was to meet locals, to listen to their stories and their first-hand accounts of issues facing their communities and to learn about local ideas on how to tackle those problems. At the heart of the issues people repeatedly identified in the consultations lay two causes: alienation between the generations and an imminent loss of the Pitjantjatjara language and culture.

A challenge for Big hART workers and community members involved was to find a suitable framework that would capture the imagination of both old and young and would bring them together in a meaningful exchange. The development of a second mainstage theatre production taking place in interaction with the Ernabella (SA) community provided one possible field of interaction. To allow for a more targeted approach in language maintenance, the development of an integrated online language course based on short film-clips proved to be another: The technological aspect and fun of creating film and digital media appealed to a large number of young people, while elders were able to pass on language and cultural knowledge in a setting which fostered respect for their wealth of experience. In a series of workshops, artists associated with Big hART developed short film clips on country with a group of youngsters from town camps and remote communities, while elders were providing and advising on the content of the language lessons.

Over the course of the project, this kind of working environment fostered mutual learning that allowed participants to experience themselves and others as creative and productive co-workers as well as helping to reduce the alienation between the generations. Beth Sometimes notes that "[by] developing activities that [were] driven by an engagement with Indigenous language such as music recording, filmmaking and travelling to cities to deliver [the] bilingual theatre show, the domains in which the language is used [were] increased. Both younger and older Pitjantjatjara participants engage[d] with broader dialogue concerning language, and in discussion around emerging conceptual realms regarding the experiences that [were] being shared.".

Many of the films were, in addition to being uploaded onto the ninti-website, published on DVD compilations and distributed by the young people across their communities. A range of workshops was also offered in other disciplines such as dance, photography, digital storytelling and music. Activities included song writing, performing, voice training, recording and sampling. As well as bringing artists to remote communities to conduct those workshops, Big hART also partnered with the record label 'Tracks of the Desert' to record and publish project material, i.e. the "Ngurakutu Ara" CD in Ernabella (SA) with proceeds going towards purchasing musical equipment for the community. All songs and other materials recorded in the project have been made available to the communities by way of portable storage media and by uploading material onto publicly accessible computers.

Especial care was taken to afford the young people as much exposure for their artworks as possible to enhance the experience of appreciation and to incite communication and reflection. Participants presented the project and their works at conferences and festivals while a strong media strategy ensured regular coverage on local and national level.

To afford opportunities for the expansion of professional skills, creative developments of the associated theatre show were organised in Ernabella (SA) to give people the chance to observe working processes, to grow and to participate in various capacities on and off-stage, i.e. by joining the multiple tours of the production to national festivals as paid performers or assisting technicians.

== Collaboration with ANU ==
In order to maximise the impact of language revitalisation, Big hART collaborated with the Centre for Aboriginal Economic Policy and Research of the Australian National University (ANU) whose researchers advised on the literacy elements of the project while conducting a three-year study, as part of the "Lifespan Learning and Literacy in Remote Indigenous Communities 2007–10" ANU and Fred Hollows Foundation linkage project. Improvement of literacy in both Pitjantjatjara and English was a strong element of the project: As many participants had had negative experiences with formal education settings and shame being a strong inhibitor to participation in Indigenous communities, literacy was playfully integrated into the general workshop activities and 'trained on the job'. This tied in with the asset-based approach Big hART adopted for the project in that the task-focus was laid on the story while literacy skills were imparted by way of accessing this story and supporting the individuals in translating it into art.

Together with the ANU researchers and other experts in the field, Big hART commenced to push for a change in national policy regarding the maintenance of Indigenous languages in Australia as part of the project's legacy which eventually prompted the release of the Commonwealth Government's strategy paper "Indigenous Languages – A National Approach" in August 2009 and the tabling of the House of Representatives Standing Committee Report into Indigenous Language Learning.

== Theatre show ==
The two pillars of the project, the Pitjantjatjara language course and the performance piece, kept informing each other throughout the project.

The theatre show Ngapartji Ngapartji premiered at the 2005 Melbourne International Arts Festival as a work in progress.

The play has lead actor Trevor Jamieson recounting his family's story, situating it in the larger context of the British nuclear testing around Maralinga. The show explores themes of dispossession and displacement from country, home and family, yet within this political constellation, the focus remains firmly on the detrimental impacts the events had on the social fabric and cultural life of the Indigenous people of the region.

As Ben Hermann notes, the play "mixes traditional storytelling, tragedy, humour, pop-culture references and direct audience participation to both entertain and educate audiences about the history of Indigenous Australians". The feature of direct participation awards audiences opportunities to learn Pitjantjatjara words and phrases, thus tying-in the show with the language focus of the larger project. As a whole, Sometimes argues, "Ngapartji Ngapartji […] exposed the general public to Indigenous language in an emotive context – theatre – providing a platform for meaningful engagement and giving liberty to understanding.".

=== Plot synopsis ===
The play starts out in its bilingual form with an introduction given by Trevor Jamieson in which he establishes his troubled brother Jangala as the touchstone of his narrative. The following show sets out to contextualise his story within the larger family story which in turn is framed by the political history of their home-country, the Spinifex nation of the South Australian desert which encompasses the British nuclear testing site of Maralinga.

Before jumping into the narrative which spans 60 years of dislocation and emotional trauma, the cast (an Indigenous choir, members of the Jamieson family and a group of non-Indigenous, Australian actors from mixed ethnic backgrounds) teaches the children's song 'Head, Shoulder, Knees and Toes' in Pitjantjatjara to the audience. The song resurfaces throughout the performance in different languages and contexts to signal and remind of a common humanity all people on earth share. To strengthen this theme and to open up an emotive space of understanding, the show also makes use of a wide array of popular songs translated into Pitjantjatjara and performed bilingually.

The family story then quickly proceeds from the family-focalised first encounters with Afghan Australian people in the desert to the beginnings of Christian missionary endeavours.

Intersecting the family story is a larger global narrative of the Second World War and its annihilating race for nuclear power which will invariably come to affect the Jamieson's as their home-country is turned into a nuclear testing ground. The links established by this narrative eventually all tie in with the family story and serve to turn the abstract, political frame into an intimately personal one in which accountability and impact can no longer be deferred onto the distant and other.

The story resumes with father Arnold Jamieson being born on country just before the family is moved to Cundalee mission ca. 440 km west of their home country. The strain of dislocation and attempts to save as many family members as possible while evacuation measures of the government fall short of communicating over the cultural divide, eventually break up the grandparents' marriage, ending in the murder of the grandmother by the grandfather. The story then follows Arnold on his journey into adulthood, longing for his country while restricted to far-away missions. The love and belonging he finds with his wife Gail opens up the hope for a new beginning beyond trauma and sorrow. Overcoming, however, is barred by the murder of Gail's mother on her way to the wedding by a taxi-driver and the vision of more and more Pitjantjatjara people losing their way in between the two cultures. As cultural protocols are explained, the audience is invited to consider the adopted solutions for reconciliation in Australia from an Indigenous perspective. The last third of the show is increasingly interspersed with video footage of intimate family conversations revolving around the worry for Jangala's life in this culturally divided space, bringing the focus back onto the brother and present issues facing the displaced Spinifex people in their country. The play ends on a note that affirms Indigenous persistence and survival, expressing hope to be one day released from the cycle of trauma and sorrow.

=== Production history ===
Ngapartji Ngapartji has toured Australia extensively in between 2005 and 2008 with the show undergoing various developments throughout its production history. In 2012, the show was revived in Canberra in a condensed version under the name Ngapartji Ngapartji One.

Presentations of the show included among others:

- 2005 Melbourne International Arts Festival (Work-in-progress)
- 2006 Araluen Arts Centre, Alice Springs (Developmental Showing)
- 2006 Melbourne International Arts Festival (World Premiere)
- 2006 Sydney Opera House (Language Show)
- 2007 Perth International Arts Festival
- 2007 The Dreaming Festival,(Language Show)
- 2007 Adelaide Cabaret Festival, (Language Show)
- 2008 Sydney Festival, Belvoir St Theatre
- 2008 Ernabella, (Open Air Community Showing)
- 2008 Araluen Arts Centre, Alice Springs
- 2011 International Community Arts Festival, Rotterdam, Netherlands (Ngapartji One)
- 2012 Canberra, Canberra Theatre Centre (Ngapartji One)

=== Awards and recognition ===
While creative content created for the project received coverage in local and national media and festivals, the overall project and associated theatre show received the following awards and nominations:

- Deadly Awards 2008 – Winner, Most Outstanding Achievement in Film, TV and Theatre
- Sydney Theatre Awards 2008 – Winner, Best Lead Man Trevor Jamieson
- Sydney Theatre Awards 2008 – Nominee, Best Mainstage Production
- Sydney Theatre Awards 2008 – Nominee, Best Direction
- NT Innovation Awards 2008 Finalist

== Legacy ==
The Ngapartji Ngapartji project officially wrapped in 2010. However, in order to create a tangible legacy of the project, Big hART produced a range of media illustrating the project's journey:

The media kit 'Memory Basket' "captures the story of the project through photos, music, text and film" and was distributed across Australian libraries.

The film Nothing Rhymes with Ngapartji documents the staging of the theatre show in a creek bed in the remote Indigenous community of Ernabella (SA) in 2008, the negotiation of cultural protocols following the death of Arnold Jamieson and the personal repercussions for the creative team.

The joint advocacy for a new national policy to revitalise and maintain Indigenous languages across Australia eventually prompted the release of the Commonwealth Government's strategy paper "Indigenous Languages – A National Approach" in August 2009 and the tabling of the House of Representatives Standing Committee Report into Indigenous Language Learning.

Another legacy of the project is the spin-off performance work Nyuntu Ngali, which was workshopped in Ernabella (SA) in early 2009 before completing seasons at the Adelaide Festival Theatre (Nov 2009), the Australian Performing Arts Market (Feb 2010) and the Sydney Theatre Company (May 2010).

The creative team of Ngapartji Ngapartji was invited to Japan in early 2012 to attend the commemorations of the Fukushima disaster and to celebrate the publication of a Japanese translation of the script.

Big hART's Namatjira project was also incepted during Ngapartji Ngapartji's lifetime, as Elton Wirri (artist and project participant) provided the link to the Hermannsburg community and helped promote Big hART as a company of credence among elders.

A most important legacy of the project according to academic Dave Palmer was that people connected with their culture in a new way, building strong identities and asserting themselves flexibly and successfully in a multicultural context. The Pitjantjatjara concept of "ngapartji ngapartji" itself provided the overarching framework for such a new form of intercultural engagement: glossed as 'I give you something. You give me something' it denotes a reciprocal exchange of gifts that create a social framework of mutual obligations. In contrast to Western ideas of trade, here the defining element of exchange is not the material value of the objects and services traded but the fact that trading itself establishes bonds that link people to each other – not only in a material way, but also socially, emotionally and spiritually. Consequently, it is deferral of immediate gratification that keeps people engaged and not a quid pro quo situation that is sought.

=== Selected credits ===
- Creative Producer: Alex Kelly
- Key Performer/Co-creator: Trevor Jamieson
- Writer/Director: Scott Rankin
- Community Producer: Dani Powell
- Performers/singers/teachers/musicians: Jarmen Jamieson, Lex Marinos, Yumi Umiumare, Tomoko Yamasaki, Saira Luther, Andrew MacGregor, Damian Mason, Pantjiti McKenzie, Lorna Wilson, Jennifer Mitchell, Janet Inyika, Beth Sometimes, Julie Miller, Maureen Watson, Elton Wirri, Kunmanara (Iris) Ajax, Amanyi (Dora) Haggie, Mervin Adamson, Belinda Abbott, Imuna Kenta, Rhoda Tjitayi, Melissa Thompson, Delaine Singer, Deanne Gillen, Alana Kelly, Sandy Brokus Abbott, Linda Stanley, Unurupa (Nami) Kulyuru, Sadie Richards, Makinti Minutjukur, Renita Stanley, Alison (Milyika) Carroll, Najeeba Azimi, Nathaniel Garrawurra, Conway Ginger, Melissa Abbott, Joanne Andrews, Keischa Haines, Kalem Haines, Nick Hemple, Dilly,
- Musical Composer: Damian Mason
- Set and Costume Design: Genevieve Dugard
- Lighting Design and Production Support: Neil Simpson
- AV Design: Suzy Bates, Olaf Meyer
- Language Reference Group: Pantjiti McKenzie, Jennifer Mitchell, Simon McKenzie, Paul Eckert, Gordon Inkatji, Yanyi Baker
- Translators: Lorna Wilson, Thomas Holder, Beth Sometimes, Yumi Umiumare, Najeeba Azimi, Lex Marinos
