= Humbug (disambiguation) =

Humbug is an exclamation pertaining to "nonsense, gibberish". Humbug (sweet) can also be a peppermint sweet.

== Places ==
- Humbug, Arizona, U.S., a ghost town in the southern Bradshaw Mountains of Yavapai County
- Humbug, California, an unincorporated community in California, U.S.
- Humbug, U.S. Virgin Islands, settlement in the United States Virgin Islands
- Humbug Mountain, a coastal mountain in Oregon, U.S.
- Mount Humbug, a mountain in Montana, U.S.
- Humbug Reach, a part of the Brisbane River in Queensland, Australia

== Entertainment ==
- Humbug, a character in Norton Juster's book The Phantom Tollbooth
- Humbug (album), a 2009 album by Arctic Monkeys
- Humbug (character), a fictional character in the Marvel Comics universe
- Humbug (magazine), a humor magazine that began in August 1957
- "Humbug" (The X-Files), an episode of the television series The X-Files
- "The Humbug" ("Le Humbug" in French), a short story by Jules Verne
- "Humbug" (1869-1870), an Australian satirical magazine in Melbourne
- Humbug, an Ethereal monster in My Singing Monsters

== Other uses ==
- HUM bug (e.g. Pseudomonas aeruginosa), a hydrocarbon-utilizing microorganism that lives in jet fuel
- Humbug (Aboriginal), a slang term meaning "begging" in some Australian Aboriginal communities
- Humbug (sweet), a traditional hard mint candy made in the United Kingdom
