= Wenten Rubuntja =

Australian artist and Aboriginal rights activist

- Born: c. 1926; Burt Creek, Northern Territory, Australia
- Died: July 2005; Northern Territory, Australia
- Known for: Watercolour painting, contemporary Indigenous Australian art
- Spouse: Cynthia
- Awards: Member of the Order of Australia

Wenten Rubuntja Pengarte AM (c.1926 – July 2005) was an Aboriginal Australian artist and Arrernte man. His early watercolour paintings are typical of the Hermannsburg School of art, while his later work includes dot painting.

He was also an Aboriginal rights activist who worked with the Central Land Council, in Alice Springs (Mparntwe) for several years as well as a number of other Aboriginal organisations.

== Early life ==
Rubuntja has said that he was born in between 1923 and 1928 (therefore estimated at 1926) (Note: An official record in 1957 recorded his name as Winton Numaja, and date of birth as 1915.) at Burt Creek (Mpweringke), a small outstation, north of Alice Springs in the Northern Territory, Australia and he had the skinname Pengarte. He was the son of goatherd Bob Rubuntja, and had a brother, Ambrose and a sister named Ruby. His father had helped postmaster and anthropologist Frank Gillen, who wrote detailed accounts of Arrernte culture. Acclaimed watercolour painter Albert Namatjira was his father's cousin.

As a young man, Rubuntja was taken to Mount Hay (Urepentye), the traditional land of his father, where he was entrusted with the Fire Altyerre that was part of his cultural heritage; he also held a number of other dreamings. He grew up around the town camps of Alice Springs, where many missionaries were active, and he was baptised by Catholic, Lutheran, and numerous other missionaries. He, like the other children around, were often baptised numerous times by the same person in exchange for a lolly, treat or meal. Rubuntja would later say of this:

You know kinds, they have no shame - that mob over there went and got baptised, and then they'd go and get baptised again. They'd get baptised three or four times. We'd all go back and sit on top of the hill, and look down and see, 'Oh, a big mob is going over there to that priest. We'll go to that priest over there - others are going to that one over there.

— Wenten Rubuntja, The town grew up dancing: the life and art of Wenten Rubuntja (2002)

During this period it was the missionary Ernest Kramer who gave him his European name.

Rubuntja attended mission schools briefly, but did not learn to read or write. He did however adapt the Christian world view with his own Arrernte traditional spirituality.

== Early career ==
In the early 1940s he lived at the Little Flower Mission, near Alice Springs, and then moving with it to Arltunga with the outbreak of World War II and, from this point on (at around 15 years of age) Rubuntja entered the workforce. During this period he hunted kangaroos to feed the troops and performed menial jobs on cattle stations; some of the only work that was open to Aboriginal people.

In 1945 they moved to the Alice Springs Telegraph Station, which was then being used as an 'Aboriginal Reserve'; this was the former site of The Bungalow. From this point he worked in various roles, both in and out of Alice Springs, including as stockman, a role for with he travelled widely, as well as taking work as a brickmaker, timber cutter, famer and in other odd jobs. He also rode as a jockey at the Hermannsburg Races.

== Career ==
Rubuntja's life changed after seeing his uncle Albert Namatjira at work, and he has said that Namatjira was his primary artistic mentor. They spent a period of time together in the 1950s, during a slow period of stock work, in which he would spend hours watching him paint. He said of this:

I wanted to learn. I used to watch him. I'd sit there and watch and keep everything in my head - how he was mixing the paint and all. He gave me a little board, a little half board, and I went back to the Telegraph Station and started painting there. I went and hid myself behind a rock to paint. I was remembering how that old man was painting - his handwork, his mixing and his ideas. After that I brought the painting up and showed it to old Namatjira and he said, 'Eh, who taught you? You've got good ideas'.

— Wenten Rubuntja, The town grew up dancing: the life and art of Wenten Rubuntja (2002)

From the 1960s Rubuntja decided to turn to painting and advocacy for his community rather than focusing on stock work as he had been.

=== Advocacy, activism, and community work ===
In 1975, Charlie Perkins was elected as first chair of the Central Land Council chair, and Rubuntja as his deputy. He served as chairman of the Central Land Council in 1976-1980 and 1985-88.

In 1976 he led over 1,000 Aboriginal people through Alice Springs demanding the passage of the Land Rights Act proposed (and passed that year) by the Liberal government led by Malcolm Fraser, and followed that up by touring the country addressing crowds on the topic. In 1988, Rubuntja and Galarrwuy Yunupingu presented Prime Minister Bob Hawke with the Barunga Statement (painted by Runbuntja and several others), which called for a treaty, at the Barunga Festival in Barunga. Rubuntja played a key part in protecting many sacred sites in and around Alice Springs.

Partly due to his efforts, the Federal Court of Australia recognised native title for the Arrernte people over large areas around Alice Springs in 2000 - the first time that Aboriginal people had been given title over municipal land.

Rubuntja was a skilled negotiator, being able to integrate Indigenous and non-Indigenous concepts in a way that brought resolutions that satisfied all parties.

He was a member of the Council for Aboriginal Reconciliation in 1991 and 1995. He co-founded Tangentyere Council, which provided tenure and essential services for Alice Springs town camps, and he also played a role in the founding of Yipirinya School and the Central Australian Aboriginal Congress.

=== Art practice ===
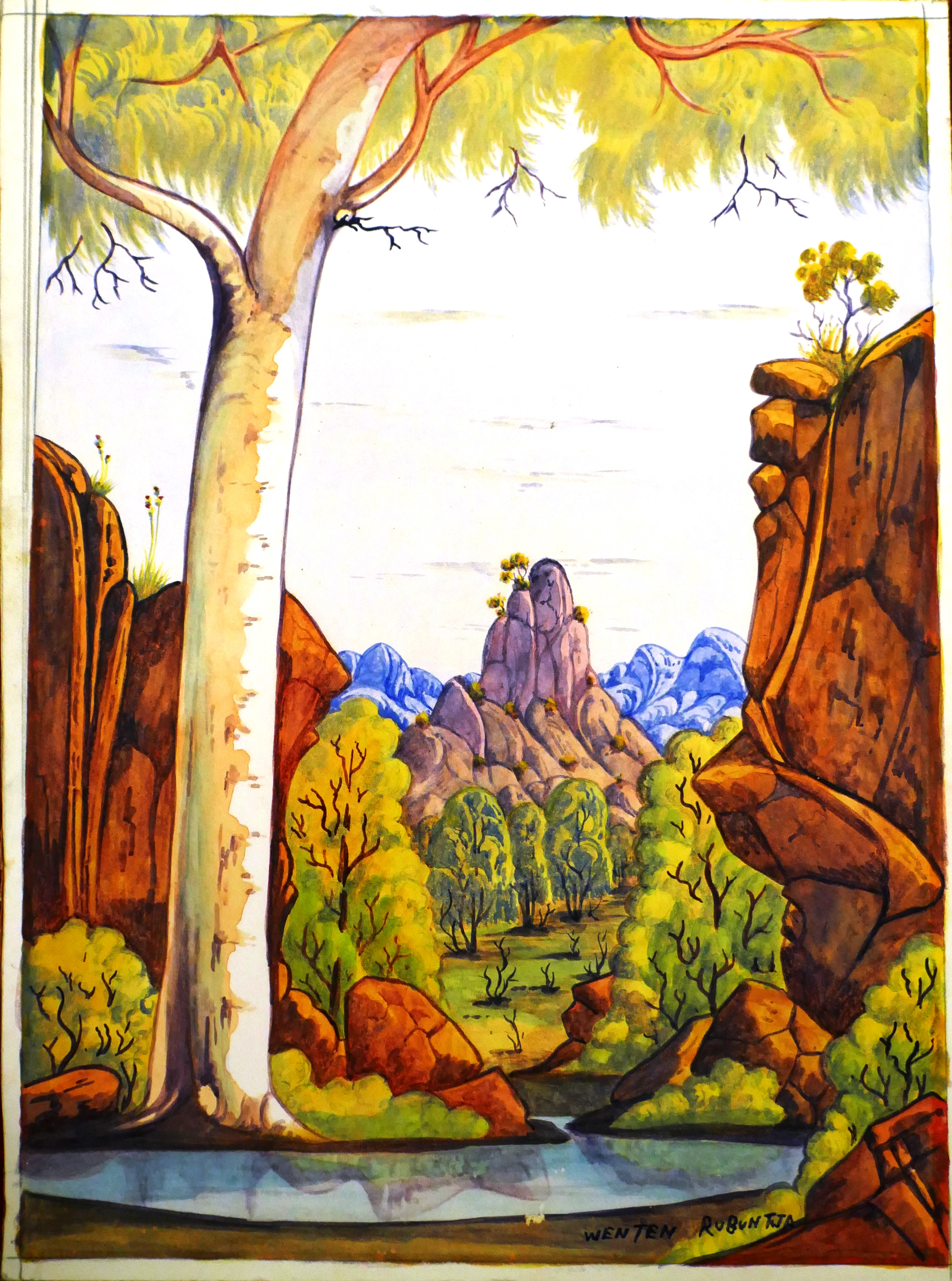
Black Snake Dreaming (1978)

Rabuntja worked at a camp called Yarrenyty Arltere, on the western side of the MacDonnell Ranges. He painted in two main styles: in that of the Hermannsburg School (Namatjira) style, and, later dot painting, after Papunya Tula developed the style in the 1970s. He believed that both styles expressed his connection to Country and his spirituality:

Doesn't matter what sort of painting we do in this country; it still belongs to the people, all the people. This is worship, work, culture. It's all Dreaming.

He painted traditional symbols, such as boomerangs, spears, lizards, and snakes, and a recurrent theme in his paintings was about finding one's way. Through the 1970s, as the older artists died, the Hermannsburg School dwindled, but Rubuntja continued to paint in this style through to the 1990s.

His earliest known watercolour was painted between 1956 and 1960, and is in the Flinders University Art Museum in Adelaide.

For the Australian Bicentenary in 1988, the Araluen Arts Centre in Alice Springs and the Australian Bicentennial Authority commissioned a stained glass window by Rubuntja for the gallery.

In 1990, he collaborated with graphic design and poster artist Chips Mackinolty to produce a screen-printed poster entitled Atnengkerre Atherne Akwete - Two laws together for the Aboriginal Areas Protection Authority of the Northern Territory (AAPA). In the centre of the poster is a watercolour painting by Mackinolty, based on a photograph he took of Rubuntja holding a boomerang. On either side of the portrait, one in watercolour and the other created with acrylic on canvas are works by Rubuntja: on the left, Uriatherrke (Mt Zell); and on the right, a dot painting of the caterpillar (altyerre) Dreaming at Nthwerrke (Emily Gap).

=== Other roles and activities ===
Rabuntja was also a storyteller and oral historian.

He played football for Amoonguna in Alice Springs.

He assisted archaeologist Mike Smith in his work.

== Personal life ==
In the 1950s, Rubuntja married Cynthia, whose surname is variously reported as Kupitja (by their son, Mervyn), and Uburtja. She was a Luritja woman. They had seven children, including Mervyn, Marlene, and Sally. Mervyn also painted in the Hermannsburg tradition.

He co-authored (with Jenny Green) his autobiography, The Town Grew Up Dancing, published in 2002.

== Recognition and honours ==
In 1995, Rubuntja was appointed a Member of the Order of Australia, for "service to Aboriginal people, particularly in Central Australia".

A photograph of Rubuntja by Greg Weight, taken in 1998, hangs in the National Portrait Gallery of Australia.

== Death and legacy ==
Rubuntja died in July 2005. Tangentyere Council, which he co-founded, paid tribute to him, saying that he played a key role in gaining tenure and rights for residents of the Alice Springs town camps, and "set an example of leadership that has been an inspiration to the next generation of Aboriginal leaders".

== Collections ==
Rabuntja said that the Queen (Elizabeth II) and several prime ministers owned his paintings. Pope John Paul II visited Alice Springs in 1986 and was presented with one of his paintings.

His work is held in several major collections, including:

- Museum and Art Gallery of the Northern Territory
- National Gallery of Australia
- National Museum of Australia
- Robert Holmes a Court collection
- Araluen Collection in Alice Springs
