= Namatjira Project =

Australian project and stage production

The Namatjira Project is an Australian community cultural development project, launched in 2009, conducted by arts and social change company Big hART. It is based in the Aboriginal communities of Hermannsburg and Alice Springs in the Northern Territory of Australia. Its focus is the life and work of the late Albert Namatjira, an Arrernte watercolour landscape artist. The project undertakes community work and has developed an award-winning touring theatre show, Namatjira, which depicts "the commercial appropriation of Aboriginal experience". Written by Scott Rankin, the show features Trevor Jamieson and Derik Lynch.

In 2017 a documentary feature film called Namatjira Project, directed by Sera Davies and produced by Big hART Productions was released. The film shows the actors, along with Namatjira's grandson Kevin, travel to London with the aim of securing copyright for Namatjira's artwork for his family, after it had been sold in 1983 by the Australian Government.

== Background ==
The main inspiration for the Namatjira Project was drawn from Big hART's Ngapartji Ngapartji project. In this, Elton Wirri, kinship grandson of Albert Namatjira, was a cast member in the namesake theatre show, creating an extensive painting on the backdrop of the set. The reaction of audience members to the name "Namatjira" and the potential of the story to engage with contemporary Australian social issues prompted writer Scott Rankin, actor Trevor Jamieson and creative producer Sophia Marinos to research the story further. This brought them into contact with the extended Western Aranda Namatjira family. The project in its form and structure was then instigated with the consent of Namatjira family representatives as a way to strengthen the passing on and sharing of culture and artistic family tradition as begun by Albert Namatjira and his watercolour and landscape painting style.

== Namatjira (the project) ==
The Namatjira Project (2009-) is a community cultural development project conducted by arts and social change company Big hART in conjunction with the descendants of the late Australian Indigenous watercolour landscape artist Albert Namatjira. Based in the Aboriginal communities of Hermannsburg (NT) and Alice Springs, the project aims to strengthen intergenerational ties, to invigorate and preserve the legacy of Albert Namatjira's style of painting and to invite the general public to reflect on Namatjira's story as a prism through which to explore Australia's past, present and future in terms of intercultural social relations and national reconciliation with Indigenous people. The project is structured around the two pillars of community work and a touring theatre show. To help strengthen sustainable income for the next generation of Namatjira artists, Big hART partners with Ngurratjuta Many Hands Art Centre (Alice Springs) to host exhibitions of contemporary Namatjira paintings alongside the performances. The project also features a digital multimedia component, with an iPhone application developed to promote the Namatjira painting style, film-based workshops with the Hermannsburg School, the development of a documentary and live webcasts generated by the community and streamed from Hermannsburg (NT) as part of an exchange between the Ntaria school and Wynyard High School in Tasmania.

As part of this large-scale, layered, long-term engagement with the Namatjira family and their famous ancestor's legacy, the project runs painting and digital arts workshops in the isolated Hermannsburg community, organises intergenerational plein-air painting trips on country, works with the local choir and collaborates with family members to raise awareness of Albert's story. On the one hand, this is done by addressing issues surrounding the copyright of Namatijra's work; on the other hand, Big hART devised a professional theatre show on Albert's life in close consultation and collaboration with the family.

== Theatre show ==
As theatre critic John McCallum writes, the stage production Namatjira tells "a story about the commercial appropriation of Aboriginal experience, told in a performance that is a reappropriation of Namatjira's story by his family and descendants, who have worked with Big hART, and the company's director and writer Scott Rankin, to reclaim it". In addition to help shape the story told, family members toured with the company throughout Australia as artists and performers, conducting watercolour painting workshops and creating large chalk drawings of their home country live on stage, while two professional actors transition between various roles to relate the story of their grandfather.

The play employs both Anglo- and Indigenous theatrical conventions by combining direct address monologues with re-enactment, musical interpretation, symbolism, the use of historical source material and tight choreography. The play is infused with a musical score which alternates between wind and string instruments, gospel songs in Aranda and popular music to strengthen the emotive layer of the show. To parallel the portraiture of Albert Namatjira through words and stage action and to underline the centrality of the visual arts metaphor as a frame for this story, a painter creates a portrait in oil of the leading actor while the show is being performed.

=== Synopsis ===
The two-act play tells the life story of Albert Namatjira in linked, chronological vignettes with interspersed reflections commenting on contemporary Australian discourses.

Act One speaks of Namatjira's birth in the central Australian desert and his subsequent upbringing on the Lutheran mission of Hermannsburg (NT), his elopement with his wife Rubina and the struggle to feed his family. Cultural differences between the Aranda and the Christian missionaries are playfully touched upon in scenes of Albert's early years and eventually crystallise around concepts of art, culture and economy as Albert meets painter and crippled war veteran Rex Battarbee, whose biography is juxtaposingly woven into the presentation of Albert's story. As their friendship evolves from a teacher-student relationship to one of equal engagement and artistic exchange, questions are raised regarding the state of contemporary Australian social relations.

Act Two relates Albert Namatjira's continued struggle for economic sustenance and his rise to fame as artist in Australia and internationally. The story of achievement and professional recognition is expressed through the infatuation of the White Australian arts world and high society (including the young Queen Elizabeth) with the persona, cultural background and art of Albert Namatjira and his financial benefits stemming from this elevated profile. This story, however, is counterbalanced with that of racism and exploitation which is presented as endemic to the entire Australian social fabric, be it in the form of taxation without equal rights, his framing as anthropological curiosity in the minds of his admirers or the humbugging by his extended family. Albert Namatjira is presented as caught between two conflicting systems of value which in the play ultimately lead to his demise – he is jailed for supplying liquor to fellow community members and dies a broken man shortly after his release. The performance of the play concludes with a video of Namatjira's descendants talking about the project's beginnings, structure and benefits for the community.

=== Production history ===
- 2010 Developmental showing: Araluen Centre for Arts & Entertainment, Alice Springs NT
- 2010 world premiere: Belvoir Street Theatre (co-directed by Wayne Blair)
- 2011 International Community Arts Festival, Rotterdam (Netherlands) – workshop version
- 2011 National tour: Melbourne, Dandenong, Geelong, Canberra, Wollongong, Lismore,
- 2012 National tour: Parramatta, Tamworth, Orange, Bathurst, Newcastle, Griffith, Wagga Wagga, Albury, Shepparton, Sale, Frankston, Warragul, Burnie, Launceston, Hobart, Adelaide, Hermannsburg (NT), Alice Springs, Townsville, Mackay, Rockhampton

=== Awards ===
- 2012: Winner, Critics' Choice artsHub Award for Contribution to the Australian Community by a Group, Organisation or Company
- 2012: Winner, Helpmann Award, for the national tour
- 2011: Nominated for two Green Room Awards, for Male Actor (Trevor Jamieson), and Production
- 2010: Winner of two Sydney Theatre Awards: Best New Australian Work, Best Newcomer (Derik Lynch)
  - Nominated for six other Sydney Theatre Awards: Best Mainstage Production, Best Direction, Best Actor in a Leading Role, Best Actor in a Supporting Role, Best Lighting Design, Best Score or Sound Design

=== Credits ===
Cast and crew include:

- Written and d irected by Scott Rankin
- Cast: Trevor Jamieson and Derik Lynch
- Composer: Genevieve Lacey
- Set Designer: Genevieve Dugard
- Lighting Designer: Nigel Levings
- Costume Designer: Tess Schofield
- Sound Designer: Jim Atkins
- Creative Producer: Sophia Marinos
- Associate Producer: Cecily Hardy
- Community Producer: Shannon Huber
- Also performed by: Genevieve Lacey, Nicole Forsythe and Rhia Parker (musicians), Robert Hannaford, Evert Ploeg and Michael Peck (portrait artists), Kevin Namatjira, Lenie Namatjira, Gwenda Namatjira, Rosabelle Namatjira, Albert Namatjira Jnr, Gloria Pannka, Ivy Pareroultja, Peter Tjutjatja Taylor, Mervyn Rubuntja, Betty Wheeler, Marcus Wheeler, Elton Wirri, Hilary Wirri, Kevin Wirri, Douglas Kwarlple Abbott (Namatjira family artists)

== Film ==
In 2017, a documentary feature film called Namatjira Project, directed by Sera Davies, was released. Actors Derik Lynch and Trevor Jamieson, along with Albert's grandson Kevin Namatjira, travel to London in a bid for the family to regain copyright to Albert Namatjira's artworks. He had left his art to his wife and children in his will, but in 1983, the Australian Government sold the rights to his work to an art dealer. They meet Queen Elizabeth II, her husband Prince Philip, and Prince Charles (later King Charles III). The film screened at CinefestOZ, the Adelaide Film Festival, Melbourne International Film Festival, and Brisbane International Film Festival.
