= Therese Ryder =

Australian artist (born 1946)

Therese Ryder (born 1946) (skin name: Ngale – Perrule) is an Eastern Arrernte artist from Ltyentye Apurte Community, 82 km south east of Alice Springs, Northern Territory, Australia. Ryder, part of the Iltja Ntjarra Many Hands Art Centre, is primarily a landscape artist and paints her traditional lands in the Central Desert. Ryder is also a linguist who significantly contributed to the Central and Eastern Arrernte Dictionary (1994) and also wrote a book, Ayeye thipe-akerte: Arrernte stories about birds (2017).

== Life and work ==
Ryder was born at Todd River Station where her father Jack worked mustering cattle and her mother Nancy as a cook. Ryder's father's country is Loves Creek, N'Dhala Gorge, Trephina Gorge, Corroboree Rock and Williams Well; the Arrernte name for this country is Pwanya. Ryder's mothers country is Titjikala but she was born at Maryvale Station. The family travelled frequently until, when Ryder was between the ages of 6 and 7, they moved to Santa Theresa Mission (which is now the Ltyentye Apurte Community). It is not known what caused the move to the mission but, while there, Ryder had to live in the dormitories with the other children, away from her parents. While at the mission, and from a young age, Ryder was taught to paint in watercolour which remains her primary medium although she does sometimes incorporate traditional dot-style works.

About her painting Ryder states that:

"My paintings are east of Alice Springs, around Ross River, my father's country. Aboriginal people must paint their country and their stories."

— Therese Ryder, Aboriginal Dream

In 1978 Ryder moved to Alice Springs where she began working with the Institute for Aboriginal Development, in the language department, where she worked on the "Central And Eastern Arrernte Dictionary" which was published in 1994 and also worked for Our Lady of the Sacred Heart College (a Catholic high school) teaching the Arrernte language.

In addition to this language work Ryder continued to work as an artist, through Iltja Ntjarra Many Hands Art Centre "the home of the Namatjira watercolour artist" and discovered that Albert Namatjira was a distant uncle on her mother's side. Ryder has achieved success as an artist and her works are part of many major national collections and she has been exhibited throughout Australia.

Following this, in 2017, Ryder wrote and illustrated Ayeye thipe-akerte: Arrernte stories about birds, which shares her appreciation for country and the birds that live there; in this Ryder writes about the birds' songs and their role in being both messengers and food. An example of this is the angepe (crow) of which she says:

When you hear crows talking, maybe early in the morning, you think they are making a crying sound. That’s when you know you are going to get some bad news or something. That happened to me three times.

— Therese Ryder, Alice Springs News Online

This book was published alongside a poster and app combining her illustrations with the Arrernte and English names of Central Australian birds. These were published by Batchelor Press and the Centre for Australian Languages and Linguistics.

Ryder has worked with other linguistics to supply language information and expertise.

== See also ==
- Art of Australia
