= Deadly Awards 2008 =

The Deadly Awards recognise achievement by Indigenous Australians in music, sport, the arts and in community service. First held in 1995, in 2008 the ceremony was hosted by Luke Carroll at the Sydney Opera House on 9 October 2008 and was broadcast on the Special Broadcasting Service (SBS) and National Indigenous Television Service (NITV) on 12 October 2008.

== Music ==
Award	Recipient	
Most Promising New Talent in Music	Adam James	
Single of the Year	History (I Was Born Blind)	Gurrumul Yunupingu
Album of the Year	Gurrumul	Gurrumul Yunupingu
Band of the Year	The Black Arm Band	
Artist of the Year	Gurrumul Yunupingu	
Jimmy Little Lifetime Achievement Award for Contribution to Aboriginal & Torres Strait Islander Music	Auriel Andrew	
APRA Song of the Year	Never Let You Go	Jodie Cockatoo-Creed & Andrew Farriss

== Sport ==
Award	Recipient
Most Promising New Talent in Sport	Chris Sandow
Outstanding Achievement in AFL	Lance Franklin
Outstanding Achievement in Rugby League	Greg Inglis
Female Sportsperson of the Year	Rohanee Cox
Male Sportsperson of the Year	Patrick Mills
The Ella Lifetime Achievement Award for Contribution to Aboriginal & Torres Strait Islander Sport	Michael Long

== The arts ==
Award	Recipient	
Dancer of the Year	Sermsah Bin Saad (aka Suri)	
Outstanding Achievement in Film, TV or Theatre	Trevor Jamieson & Scott Rankin	Ngapartji Ngapartji
Outstanding Achievement in Literature	Anita Heiss & Peter Minter	Macquarie PEN Anthology of Aboriginal Literature
Outstanding Achievement in Entertainment	Stephen Page	Bangarra Dance Theatre
Actor of the Year	Leah Purcell	
Visual Artist of the Year	Michael Cook	

== Community ==
Award	Recipient	
Outstanding Achievement in Aboriginal & Torres Strait Islander Education	Paul Djolpa McKenzie	Maningrida CEC School
Outstanding Achievement in Aboriginal & Torres Strait Islander Health	Dr Noel Hayman	Inala Indigenous Health Service
Broadcaster of the Year	"Uncle" Peter Hill	The Shout Out Show, 98.9FM Queensland
Young Leader of the Year	Matthew Cooke	Nhulundu Wooribah Indigenous Health Organisation, QLD
