= Elliott Ronald Bull =

Aboriginal Australian artist (1942–1979)

- Born: 22 August 1942; Lake Tyers Mission, Victoria
- Died: 8 September 1979 (aged 37); Melbourne, Victoria
- Resting place: Emerald cemetery, Macclesfield
- Known for: Aboriginal Australian art

Elliott Ronald Bull (1942–1979) was an Aboriginal Australian (of the Gunaikurnai people) artist who produced 2,000 works throughout his life. He is described by the Australian Dictionary of Biography as "a significant figure in the regional history of Aboriginal Australia".

== Early life ==
Bull was born at the Lake Tyers Mission in Victoria in 1942, but was immediately removed from his family by the state government, as part of the Stolen Generations. At age ten, he was sent to the Tally Ho Boys' Home in Burwood, outside of Melbourne. He had access to painting supplies and took up painting in his time there. Bull's formative experiences were in an era when Australian government policies focused on integrating Aboriginal people into a white Australian mainstream, while denying the legitimacy of Aboriginal people in their homeland.

The administrators at the boys' home recognized Bull's talent as an artist, and when he left at the age of fifteen, he was placed into foster care with a woman with connections to the art scene. As a result, Bull was in contact with painters Hans Heysen and Ernest Buckmaster, and studied informally under Buckmaster.

== Art ==
Much of Bull's works feature elements of Aboriginal identity and landscapes. His artistic works have often compared to those created by artist Albert Namatjira.

=== Figurative work ===
His earliest work consisted of figurative art, but nearly all of these are now lost. These included works depicting Biblical figures as Aboriginal people. The sole extant work of this period is Bull's mural in Pentridge Prison.

Bull had been sentenced multiple times to Pentridge for minor offenses. In 1962, a warden who knew of his artistic talents commissioned Bull, then an inmate at Pentridge, to paint a mural in a prison hallway that was being renovated. His mural depicted a scene from pre-European Australia, with three men at a campfire, carrying hunting weapons and a kangaroo. Hidden within the background are six kangaroo face formed by knots in the tree trunks and negative space.

=== Landscape work ===
Bull was better known for his landscape art. Part of this was due to a bias against Aboriginal art; his explicitly Aboriginal figurative art would not have been welcomed at galleries. His first exhibition was in 1965, and he also participated in group exhibitions with Lin Onus and one of Albert Namatjira's sons.

Like Albert Namatjira's work, Bull's landscapes have aspects of European and Aboriginal style. They are visually similar to European-style landscapes from one of his early influences, Hans Heysen. But his landscapes also have Aboriginal aspects of "inside" and "outside", and the very act of painting the land can be seen as a demonstration of the Aboriginal ownership of the land.

=== Other work ===
Bull was also known for his sense of humour and storytelling. He spoke about his experiences in an article, To White Families Who Take Children for Holidays, and appeared in an Australian Broadcasting Corporation programme, reflecting on his life and the trauma it entailed.

Bull died of hypertensive cardiovascular disease in 1979, at his home at Mont Albert, Melbourne. He was buried

Many sources relating to Bull's life are held by the National Library of Australia.
