= Scott Rankin =

Australian theatre director and writer

Scott Rankin (born 1959) is an Australian theatre director, writer and co-founder and creative director of the arts and social change company Big hART. Based in Tasmania, Rankin works in and with isolated communities and diverse cultural settings, as well as in commercial performance.

== Early life and education ==
Rankin was born in 1959 in Sydney and grew up there. His parents were businesspeople who owned an early learning specialist toyshop and lived on a Chinese junk in Lane Cove, moored on Sydney Harbour for 21 years.

Rankin enrolled in an arts degree but did not complete it, instead working in a retirement village and offering music workshops to homeless youth. Since 1981, he has mainly lived and worked from the far north-west coast of Tasmania.

== Work ==
As creative director of Big hART and as playwright and director, Rankin has created or collaborated on many large-scale Australian stage productions: Namatjira for the Namatjira family; Ngapartji Ngapartji for Trevor Jamieson, Box the Pony for Leah Purcell; RiverlanD for Wesley Enoch; StickybrickS for the Northcott Public Housing community in Surry Hills, Sydney; Junk Theory for the Sutherland Shire, as well as internationally touring works such as Certified Male.

== Recognition ==
Rankin is a Fellow of the Australia Council for the Arts.

Rankin and his theatre works have received many awards, including:

- 2000: Human Rights Award
- 2000: New South Wales Premier's Literary Award, for Box the Pony
- 2000: Queensland Premier's Literary Award, for Box the Pony
- 2002: Ros Bower Award for Community Cultural Development
- 2004: Three Melbourne Green Room Awards for Beasty Girl (most innovative work, best female actor in leading role (Leah Purcell), best direction)
- Two Green Room Award Nominations for Namatjira (best production and best actor (Trevor Jamieson));
- Two Sydney Theatre Critics Awards (best new Australian work and best newcomer (Derik Lynch) and another 6 nominations (best mainstage production, best direction, best actor in a leading role, best actor in a supporting role, best lighting design and best score or sound design);
- Deadly Award (most outstanding achievement in film, TV or theatre)
- Critics Choice ArtsHub Award
- Helpmann Award
- World Health Organization Award for Safe Communities
- 2018: Tasmanian state recipient, Australian of the Year

His works have been included in many arts festivals, including Melbourne, Adelaide, Perth, Brisbane, Sydney, Edinburgh, and the Tasmanian 10 Days on the Island. He has also toured to Sweden, Iceland, Ireland, Scotland, England, South Africa, New Zealand, Germany and the Netherlands.

== List of works ==
List of Rankin's works:

- Glynn With a Why? (1988)
- Kissing Frogs (1991)
- Girl
- Pandora Slams the Lid (1993)
- Girl / Pandora Slams the Lid (1994)
- Three Men Walk into a Bar (1996)
- Glynn Nicholas Group – Wrung Out (1996)
- Box the Pony (1997)
- Pandora's Shed (1998)
- Pumping Irony (1999)
- Certified Male (1999)
- Leaves Falling at Midnight (2001)
- Career Highlights of the Mamu (2002)
- What the World Needs Now (2002)
- Beasty Girl: The Secret Life of Errol Flynn (2003)
- Riverland (2004)
- Junk Theory (2007)
- Brave Men Run in Our Family (2007)
- StickybrickS (2007)
- Ngapartji Ngapartji (2008)
- Nyuntu Ngali (2009)
- This is Living (2009)
- Beat Bop Road (2009)
- Namatjira Project (2010),
- Hipbone Sticking Out (2013)
