= Clifford Hocking =

Australian impresario & festival director

Clifford Hocking AM
- Born: 9 February 1932; Melbourne, Australia
- Died: 12 June 2006 (aged 74); Melbourne
- Occupation(s): Impresario, festival director
- Awards: Helpmann Award, Ken Myer Medallion for the Performing Arts

Clifford Henry Hocking AM (9 February 1932 – 12 June 2006) was an Australian impresario and festival director.

== Biography ==
He was born in Melbourne on 9 February 1932 to Olive and Fred Hocking, the fifth brother in his family and the youngest.

His first entrée into the arts world was as a messenger boy for ABC Radio in 1949. After travelling overseas he returned to Melbourne where he and a business partner opened Thomas' Records, which he managed until 1965.

After meeting a then-unknown Barry Humphries in 1962, he became Humphries' manager for three Australian tours between 1962 and 1969 ("A Nice Night's Entertainment", "Excuse I" and "Just a Show").

He also began to contract overseas artists to perform in Australia, such as Max Adrian, Ali Akbar Khan, Ravi Shankar, and others.

In 1965 David Vigo (1943–2016) joined his company, and the list of artists then extended to such names as American stars The Pointer Sisters, Blossom Dearie and Alvin Ailey; British performers Cleo Laine and John Dankworth, Donovan, Elvis Costello, Derek Jacobi, Pam Ayres, Lenny Henry and Rowan Atkinson; and European performers such as Victor Borge, Stephane Grapelli, Paco Pena and Alirio Diaz.

Local artists included Don Burrows, Slim Dusty, Slava Grigoryan, and Kate Ceberano.

He co-directed the 1988 Melbourne Summer Music Festival. He was artistic director for the 1990 Adelaide Festival and the 1997 Melbourne International Arts Festival.

Clifford Hocking died on 12 June 2006, aged 74, in a Melbourne hospital, survived by his two elder brothers. On 15 June, Senator Rod Kemp, the Minister for the Arts and Sport, paid tribute to Hocking in a speech to parliament. A celebration of his life was held in Hamer Hall, Melbourne, on 29 August.

== Honours and awards ==
Hocking was appointed a Member of the Order of Australia (AM) in 1990, for service to the arts and entertainment.

In 1991 he was awarded the inaugural Ken Myer Medallion for the Performing Arts.

The Helpmann Awards is an awards show, celebrating live entertainment and performing arts in Australia, presented by industry group Live Performance Australia (LPA) since 2001. In 2001, Hocking received the JC Williamson Award, the LPA's highest honour, for their life's work in live performance.
