= Hermannsburg School =

Australian art movement

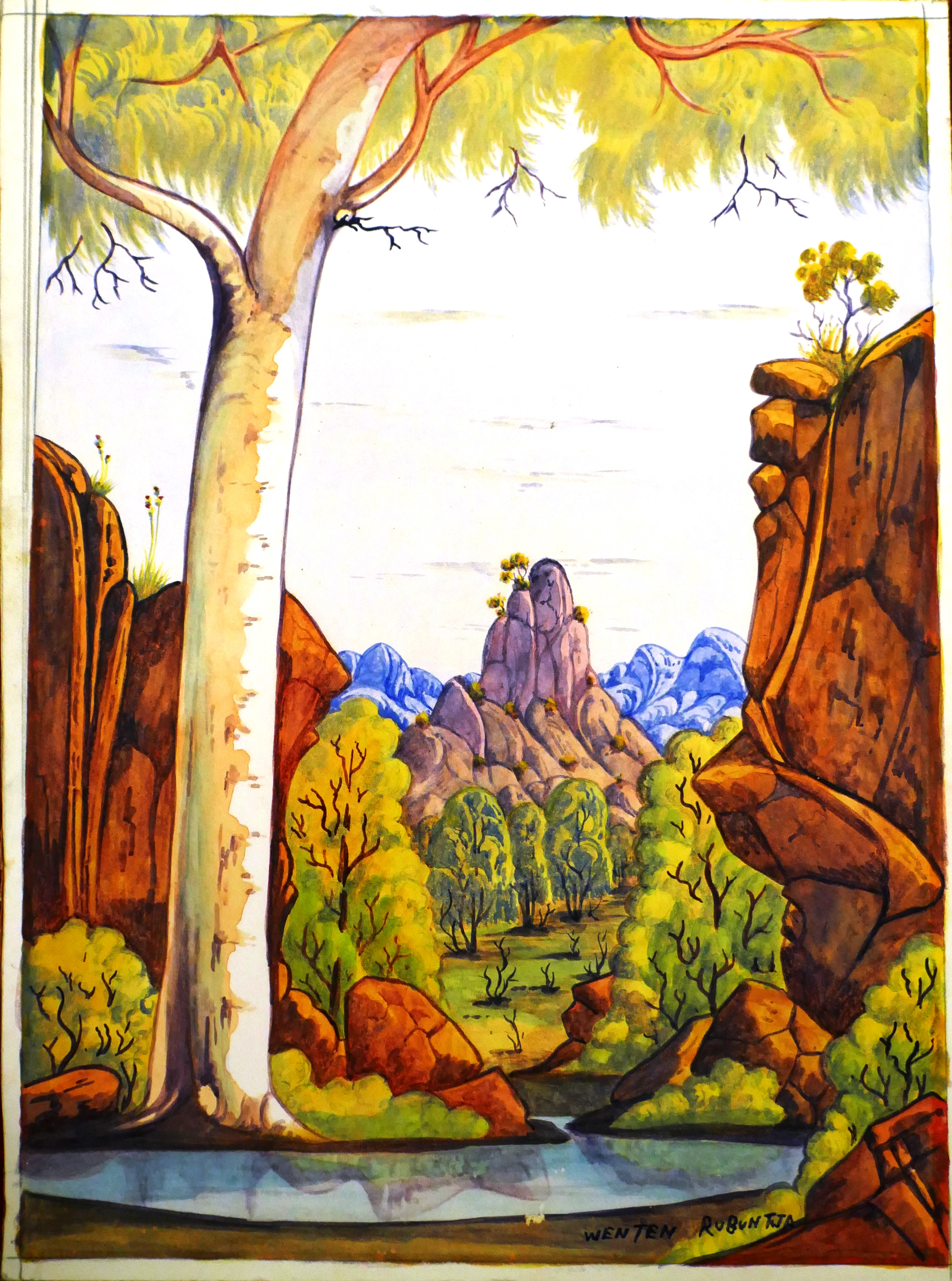
Black Snake Dreaming, by Wenten Rubuntja (1978)

The Hermannsburg School, also known as the Hermannsburg School of Modern Art, is an art movement, or art style, which began at the Hermannsburg Mission in the 1930s. The best known artist of the style is Albert Namatjira. The movement is characterised by watercolours of western-style landscapes that depict the often striking colours of the Australian outback.

== History ==
Located 125 km (78 mi) west of Alice Springs, in Central Australia, Hermannsburg was founded by German Lutheran missionaries from the Hermannsburg Mission Society in 1877. The Western Arrernte people have lived in this region for thousands of years.

In 1941 Rex Battarbee founded the Aranda Art Group, which controlled the supply of materials and helped handle the business affairs of the emerging artists.

== Style ==
The Hermannsburg painters' work is characterised by soft hues, usually water colours, of their Western Arrernte landscape, which European settlers named the Western Macdonnell Ranges. Previously, Western Arrernte people had only used art in a ceremonial sense, as topographical interpretations of their country and their particular Dreamings, painted using symbols.

Early works by Albert Namatjira also conveyed this spiritual connection with the land. They shared an intimate knowledge of the land on which they had lived for thousands of years. The ghost gum features prominently in the works, a sacred and important part of Western Arrernte mythology. In the best works by Otto Pareroultja, trees were painted as ancestral beings with body-like trunks and arm-like branches.

== Members and progress of the movement ==
Albert Namatjira began his distinctive style after seeing an exhibition by travelling artists to the mission, Rex Battarbee and John Gardner, in the 1930s.

Other artists from the Hermannsburg school include Wenten Rubuntja, Walter Ebatarinja, Otto Pareroultja, and his brothers Ruben and Edwin, as well as Albert's sons, Enos, Oscar, Ewald, Maurice, and Keith, his grandson Gabriel, his son-in-law Claude Panka, as well as his granddaughter Gloria Panka.

Other members of the school include the brothers Henoch and Herbert Raberaba, and Clem Abbott.

In the late 1970s, after several of the main proponents of the style had died, the movement started to fade and lose momentum. However, Wenten Rubuntja continued to paint right into the 1990s.

== Legacy ==
The Hermannsburg School represented a major change of direction for Australian Aboriginal art. The works produced by the movement were accessible to collectors who were more familiar with western-style landscapes. It was also a successful economic model for aboriginal communities.

Today Hermannsburg is also well known for its potters, particularly its women.

== See also ==
- Australian Aboriginal Art
