= Humbug, U.S. Virgin Islands =

Coordinates: 17°42′44″N 64°43′51″W

Humbug, United States Virgin Islands
- Village
- Interactive map of Humbug, United States Virgin Islands
- Country: United States Virgin Islands
- Island: Saint Croix
- Time zone: UTC-4 (AST)

Humbug is a settlement on the island of Saint Croix in the United States Virgin Islands.
