= Mount Humbug =

US (Montana) summit

Coordinates: 45°47′35″N 112°36′41″W

Mount Humbug is a summit in Silver Bow County, Montana, in the United States. With an elevation of 8,219 feet (2,505 m), Mount Humbug is the 811th highest summit in the state of Montana.
