= Alex Kelly (filmmaker) =

Australian filmmaker

- Occupations: Freelance artist, filmmaker

Alex Kelly is an Australian freelance artist, filmmaker and producer based in regional Australia. Kelly was born in regional NSW and grew up in a farming community near Wodonga in regional Victoria,

Kelly has worked with diverse communities in Australia and around the world including Coober Pedy, Alice Springs, Amsterdam, Barcelona and the UK organising and lobbying for social change. She has been involved in community development, the arts, media (communication), environmental protection and social justice projects.

== Social justice ==
In the 1990s, Kelly was involved in organising campaign events in Melbourne and across Australia. She was involved in the campaign and blockade against the proposed Jabiluka uranium mine in the Kakadu National Park led by the Mirrar people, NT where she developed an interest in independent media. Back in Melbourne, she was involved in the founding collective of Melbourne Indymedia and worked on SKA TV's weekly activist news program Access News on Channel 31, Melbourne. Alongside her work in environmental conservation, sustainable development and social justice, she has worked with young people sharing skills in media arts in remote central Australian areas.

In 2001, Kelly took part in the anti-capitalist People's Global Action conference and "people's caravan" in Bolivia. She worked for social justice organisations in the Netherlands, Spain and Morocco, was co-editor of Greenpepper (social justice and environmental magazine) in Amsterdam, participated in organising a technology event with Genderchangers collective in Croatia and did grass roots distribution for several Australian independent film makers by travelling around Europe screening their documentaries in social centres, squats, at protests, conferences and gatherings for 6 months in 2002/3.

She was in Coober Pedy for the commemoration of the 50th anniversary of the first British atomic test at Emu Field in 1953. In 2004, Kelly settled in Coober Pedy to work on projects and campaigns on environmental issues, youth and arts program. She volunteered with the Kupa Piti Kungka Tjuta – a group of senior Aboriginal women on the 'Irati Wanti–Poison Leave It' campaign which successfully halted a proposed nuclear waste dump in South Australia. She also worked as a voluntary projectionist at the Coober Pedy Drive-In Cinema.

Kelly has supported the anti-fracking campaigns across the NT for several years, running workshops on Story Based Strategy and visiting communities such as Katherine and Borroloola who are organising against this toxic industry. Alex is supporting the campaigns to end artwashing with a particular focus on getting the annual Darwin Festival to drop their sponsorship agreement with Santos.

== Creative Producing ==
In 2003, she started to work for the acclaimed Australian arts and social change company Big hART Inc., commencing as a production assistant on the projects Knot@Home in 2003, Radio Holiday, Stickybricks and Junk Theory, continuing as Creative Producer of Ngapartji Ngapartji from 2005 to 2010 and becoming National Producer in 2012.

With Big hART Inc., she collectively developed the large-scale community development and art-making project Ngapartji Ngapartji as creative producer from 2004 to 2010. For the work on Ngapartji Ngapartji, Kelly moved to Alice Springs where she also co-incepted the outdoor cinema 'Lunacine'. In 2006, she worked as NT Triple J Arts Reporter. After Ngapartji Ngapartji wrapped in 2009, Kelly worked as community liaison adviser to Senator Bob Brown, leader of the Australian Greens in Canberra.

== Speculative Futures ==
Since 2015 Alex Kelly has been collaborating with David Pledger on the futuring practice The Things We Did Next.

== Film ==
Kelly has worked across film as a producer, impact producer and director. She supported the production of over 75 short documentary films for the Ngapartji Ngapartji project alongside filmmaker Suzy Bates and Pitjantjatjara young people.

She co-produced and co-directed Globalisation 101 with Kim Beamish for SKATV and Friends of the Earth in 2001.

Kelly was producer on the award-winning documentary Nothing Rhymes with Ngapartji which premiered on ABC TV in 2011 &. The film, directed by Bates, explores Aboriginal Australian languages, the legacy of the Maralinga atomic tests in South Australia, and the staging of the Ngapartji Ngapartji theatre show in the remote Aboriginal community of Ernabella, in the APY Lands. It was screened at the This is Not Art Festival (Newcastle, Australia), Yosemite Arts Festival (Yosemite, USA), Radar International Documentary Film Festival (Germany), the International Film Festival (Ireland), Docs Campus (NZ) and the Global Social Change Film Festival (Indonesia). The documentary won the El Capitan Award at the 2011 Yosemite Film Festival and was finalist in both the ATOM Awards 2010 (Best Biography) and Global Social Change Film Festival 2011.

In 2011 Kelly worked as production assistant on the drama shoot of PAW Media/ Rebel Films Coniston, about the Coniston massacre. Coniston won the 2012 Best Docudrama ATOM Award.

In 2012, Kelly directed the 30-minute documentary Queen of the Desert for 360 Degree Films, showcasing the collaborative work of transgender hairstylist Starlady Nungari and the Areyonga community. Queen of the Desert was funded by Screen Australia, Screen NT and ABC TV for the Opening Shot scheme. The film screened at Fist Full of Films Festival (Darwin 2012), Cockatoo Island Film Festival (Cockatoo Island, 2012) and had two successful openings in both Melbourne and Alice Springs and premiered on ABC2 on 25 November 2012.

From 2013 to 2015 Kelly worked at the Global Impact & Distribution Producer on Naomi Klein and Avi Lewis' This Changes Everything project. The documentary film premiered at Toronto International Film Festival and was released globally in the lead up to the COP21 Climate Change meeting in Paris in December 2015.

Kelly also co-founded the Something Somewhere Film Festival in Alice Springs in 2015.

In 2017 she produced the short film The Island for The Guardian, and in 2018 produced the documentary Island of the Hungry Ghosts. Island of the Hungry Ghosts premiered at Tribeca Film Festival in April 2018, where it won Best Documentary.

In 2019 Kelly produced Pay the Rent with Buzzfeed Australia, and worked on the completion and release of Maya Newell's feature documentary In My Blood It Runs, which premiered at Hot Docs International Film Festival in Toronto, Canada.

In 2022 Alex worked as an Impact Producer on Maya Newell's short documentary The Dreamlife of Georgie Stone which premiered on Netflix worldwide in September 2022.

== Recognition ==
Kelly has been on the board of a range of media, arts and political organisations, among others Arid Lands Environment Centre, RedHOT Arts, Engage Media and was artistic consultant to the 'Art at the Heart Regional Arts Conference' (2008).

In 2008, Kelly won the Australia Council for the Arts 'Kirk Robson Award' & and was a YouthActionNet fellow &, taking part in the 'Global Fellows Retreat' in Washington DC (USA, 2008).

In 2010, she undertook an Australia Council residency at Cite International des Arts in Paris.

In 2011, she received the Screen Territory Bob Plasto Fellowship.

She was awarded a 2012 Churchill Fellowship to undertake research into social change film distribution, impact and outreach models.

Kelly was awarded The Fitzgerald Social Change Award – NT Human Rights Awards in 2016 and in 2015 was part of Screen Producers Australia's Ones To Watch program and was the Kickstart pitch winner for a series in development How to Make Trouble and Influence People.

She was a 2016 Sidney Myer Creative Fellow. In 2020 Alex was awarded a Bertha Foundation Bertha Challenge Fellowship.

== Miscellaneous ==
Kelly has been founding member of Malice Springs Roller Derby League. In 2012 she transferred to VRDL ‘Victorian Roller Derby League’ where she skates under the name Axle Sparx. She was crowned 1998 "Miss Camel Cup" at the annual Alice Springs event.

In 2010/11, she tour-managed the Australian summer tour of brass band Orchestra Del Sol from Edinburgh (UK).
