= Big hART =

Australian arts company

- Formation: 1992
- Headquarters: Burnie, Tasmania
- Location: Australia
- Creative Director: Scott Rankin
- Website: www.bighart.org
- Formerly called: Big hART

Big hART is an Australian arts and social-justice company based in Tasmania.

== History ==
Big hART was founded in 1992 by playwright and director Scott Rankin and John Bakes in Burnie, north-western Tasmania, with the aim of countering disadvantage and a spike in crime following mill closures in the town.

== Work ==
The company initiates large scale, long-term community cultural development projects in disadvantaged communities in urban, regional and remote Australia. Projects are task-focused and are to increase social, cultural and economic participation for community members following a three-step model approach.

== Projects ==
Projects by Big hART include, among others:

- Museum of the Long Weekend (Canberra 2013).
- Yijala Yala (Roebourne, 2010–).
- Namatjira (Ntaria, 2009–) .
- Smashed (Tasmania, 2010).
- Nyuntu Ngali (Ernabella/ Alice Springs, 2009)
- Ngapartji Ngapartji (Alice Springs and surrounds, NT & SA, 2004–2009)
- Gold (NSW, 2006–2009)
- Northcott Narratives (Surry Hills – Sydney, 2003–2007).
- Drive (Tasmania, 2008–2009).
- Love Zombies (Tasmania, 2009)
- This is Living (Tasmania, 2007–2008).
- Drive in Holiday & Radio Holiday (North West Tasmania, 2005–2009).
- Lucky
- Junk Theory (Cronulla Shire – Sydney, 2006–2009).
- Nuff Stuff (Groote Eylandt, Tennant Creek and Tiwi Islands, 2006)
- Knot@Home (NSW, Vic and Tasmania, 2001–2004).
- Hurt (NSW, Vic and Tasmania).

== Awards ==
=== Ngapartji Ngapartji ===
- Deadly Awards 2008 – Winner, Most Outstanding Achievement in Film, TV and Theatre
- Sydney Theatre Awards 2008 – Winner, Best Lead Man Trevor Jamieson
- Sydney Theatre Awards 2008 – Nominee, Best Mainstage Production
- Sydney Theatre Awards 2008 – Nominee, Best Direction
- NT Innovation Awards 2008 Finalist
