= Melbourne International Arts Festival =

Australian international arts festival (1986-2012)

- Genre: Major arts, theatre, music and cultural festival
- Frequency: Annually
- Locations: Melbourne, Australia
- Years active: 26
- Inaugurated: 1986
- Participants: 1,000 artists (2013)
- Attendance: 416,547 (2013)

Melbourne International Arts Festival, formerly Spoleto Festival Melbourne – Festival of the Three Worlds, then Melbourne International Festival of the Arts, becoming commonly known as Melbourne Festival, was a major international arts festival held in Melbourne, Australia, from 1986 to 2019.

In 2020, a new festival named RISING was announced to replace both the MIAF and the White Night Festival. RISING was conceived as a winter festival combining elements of visual art, music, performance, and large-scale public installations. The inaugural RISING festival was initially scheduled for May 2020 but was postponed due to the COVID-19 pandemic. Subsequent attempts to launch in 2021 were also disrupted by the pandemic. The festival eventually debuted in June 2022.

== History ==
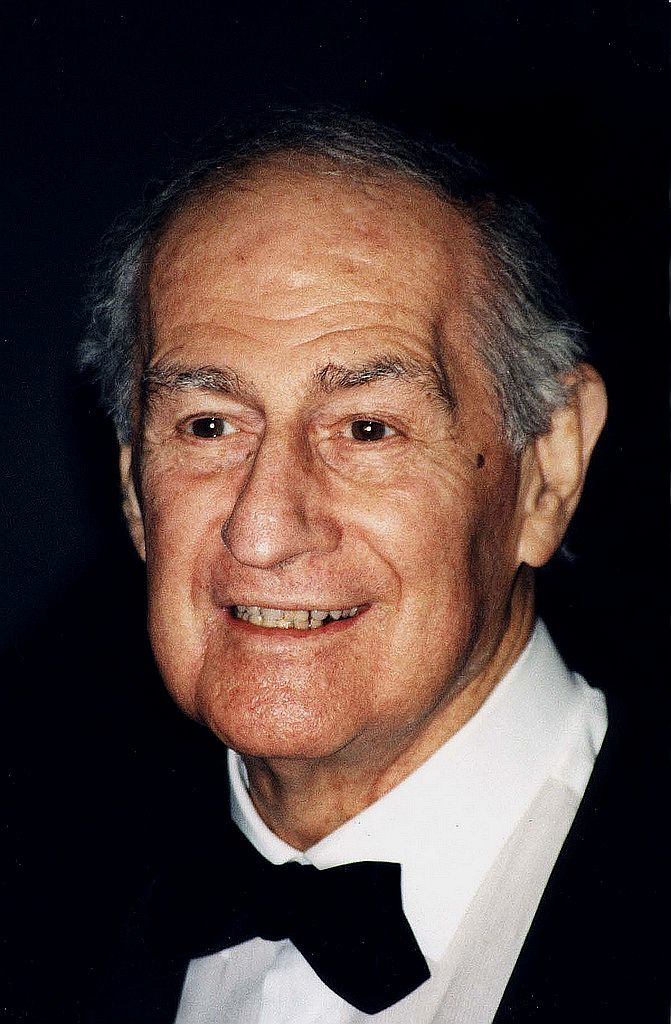
Gian Carlo Menotti, the festival's first Artistic Director

=== Names ===
Spoleto Melbourne – Festival of the Three Worlds, under the direction of composer Gian Carlo Menotti, was established in 1986 by the Cain government, as a sister festival of the Festival dei Due Mondi in Spoleto and the Spoleto Festival USA held in Charleston, South Carolina. The festival changed its name to the Melbourne International Festival of the Arts in 1990. It then became known as Melbourne International Arts Festival from 2003, becoming commonly known as Melbourne Festival.

The Festival was later renamed Melbourne International Arts Festival, which it retained until 2019.

=== Directors ===
It has had a number of high-profile artistic directors, including Clifford Hocking, Leo Schofield, Robyn Archer, Richard Wherrett, Jonathan Mills and Kristy Edmunds.

The artistic director for the 2009–2012 festivals was Brett Sheehy. Previously, Sheehy was artistic director of the Adelaide Festival of Arts (2006–2008), and Festival Director and Chief executive of Sydney Festival (2002–2005).

In January 2012, Melbourne Festival announced the appointment of Josephine Ridge as creative director for the 2013 festival and beyond. Prior to her appointment Josephine was general manager, then executive director and co-CEO with four artistic directors at Sydney Festival. Josephine appointed several high-profile arts workers to her creative team, including Louise Neri (Creative Associate – Visual Arts) and Richard Tognetti (Creative Associate – Music).

=== Selected productions ===
The 2006 Melbourne Festival hosted a production of Ngapartji Ngapartji, with much of the dialogue in the Pitjantjatjara language.

It presented several productions by The Black Arm Band, including murundak in 2006, Hidden Republic in 2008, and dirtsong in 2009, showcasing the group's work during this period.

In 2015 the Australian Art Orchestra debuted Water Pushes Sand at the Festival. The piece merged Australian and Sichuanese folk musical styles and featured Zheng Sheng Li, a Sichuan Cheng Du "face changing" dancer.

In 2019 it was announced that in 2020, the festival would be transformed into Rising, to be held in the winter over several weeks. The new festival would combine the Melbourne International Arts Festival with White Night Melbourne Reimagined.

== Description ==
Melbourne Festival was one of the most significant festivals in Australia, together with the Sydney Festival and the Adelaide Festival of Arts. It hosted performances by established artistic companies as well as independent acts. It was an important event on the Australian cultural calendar. Each festival invited a range of dance, theatre, music, visual arts, multimedia and outdoor events from renowned and upcoming Australian and international companies and artists to Melbourne. It offered a wide variety of free family-friendly events.

It took place over 17 days each October.

== Artistic directors ==
Years	Artistic Director
1986–88	Gian Carlo Menotti
1989–91	John Truscott AO
1992–93	Richard Wherrett AM
1994–96	Leo Schofield AM
1997	Clifford Hocking AM
1998–99	Sue Nattrass
2000–01	Jonathan Mills AO
2002–04	Robyn Archer AO
2005–08	Kristy Edmunds
2009–12	Brett Sheehy AO
2013–15	Josephine Ridge
2016–19	Jonathan Holloway

== See also ==
- Melbourne International Comedy Festival
- Melbourne Fringe Festival
- Melbourne International Film Festival
- Melbourne Writers Festival
- Moomba Festival
- Next Wave Festival
- Sydney Festival
- Perth International Arts Festival
- Brisbane Festival
- Adelaide Festival
- Ten Days on the Island
