= Albert Namatjira =

Australian painter (1902–1959)

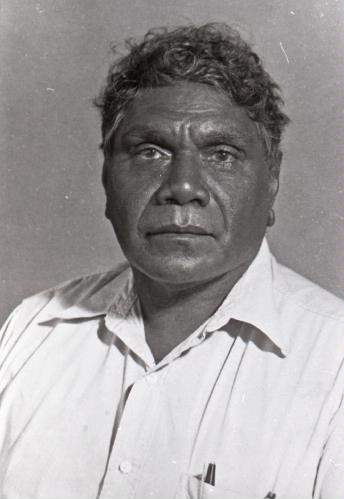
- Namatjira, c. 1950
- Born: Elea Namatjira; 28 July 1902; Hermannsburg Lutheran Mission, Northern Territory of South Australia (now Northern Territory), Australia
- Died: 8 August 1959 (aged 57); Alice Springs, Northern Territory, Australia
- Known for: Watercolour painting, contemporary Indigenous Australian art
- Spouse: Rubina
- Awards: Queen's Coronation Medal

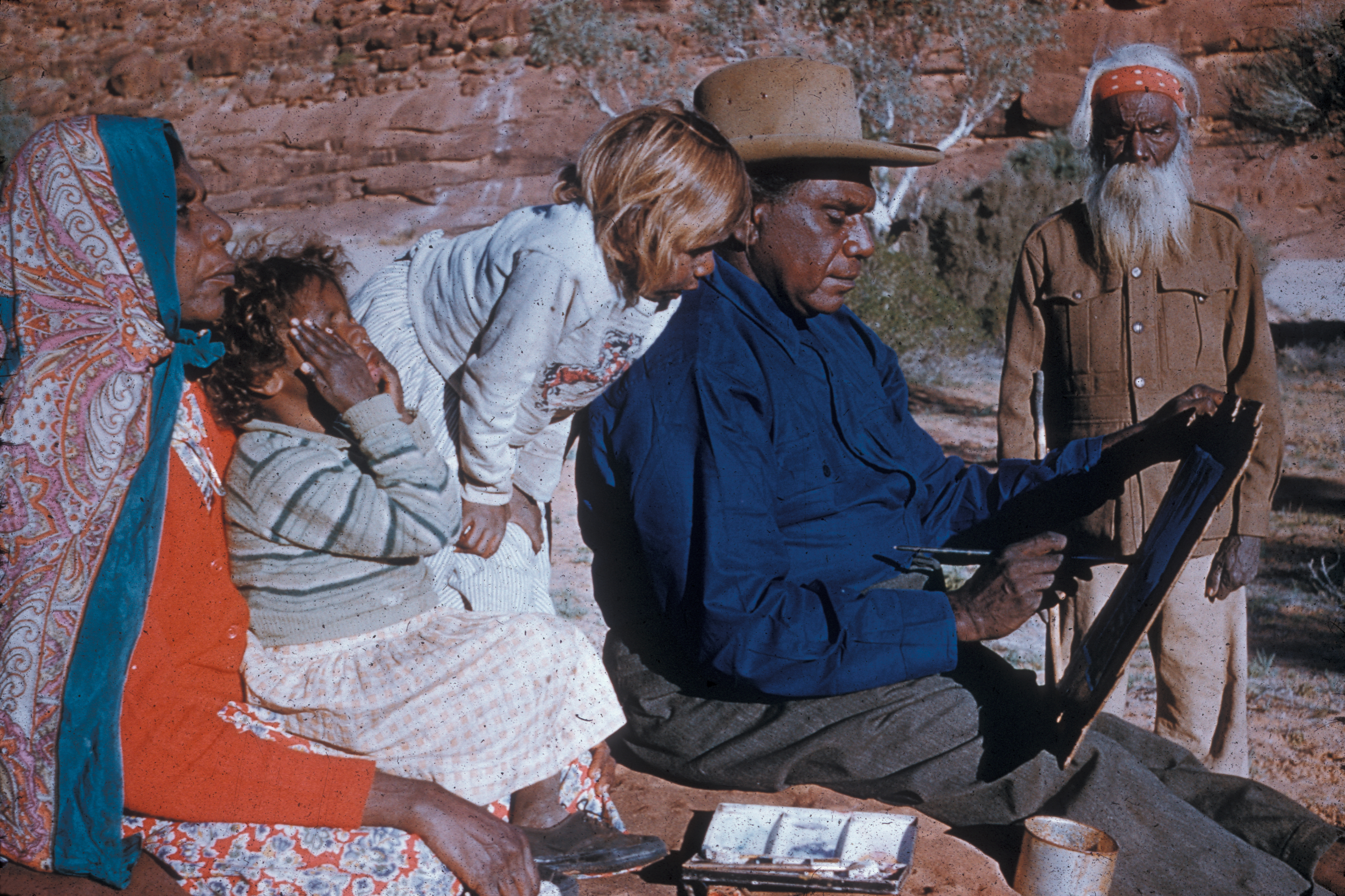
Albert Namatjira painting in Alice Springs (Mparntwe), c.1957

Albert Namatjira (pronounced [namacɪra]; born Elea Namatjira; 28 July 1902 – 8 August 1959) was an Arrernte painter from the MacDonnell Ranges in Central Australia, widely considered one of the most notable Australian artists. As a pioneer of contemporary Indigenous Australian art, he was arguably one of the most famous Indigenous Australians of his generation. He was the first Aboriginal artist to receive popularity from a wide Australian audience.

A member of the Western Arrernte people, Namatjira was born and raised at the remote Hermannsburg Lutheran Mission, 126 km west-southwest from Alice Springs. He showed interest in art from an early age but it was not until 1934 (aged 32) and under the guidance of Rex Battarbee that he began to paint seriously. Namatjira's richly detailed, Western art-influenced watercolours of the outback departed significantly from the abstract designs and symbols of traditional Aboriginal art, and inspired the Hermannsburg School of painting. He became a household name in Australia and reproductions of his works hung in many homes throughout the nation.

In 1956, a portrait of Namatjira by William Dargie became the first of an Aboriginal person to win the Archibald Prize. Namatjira was awarded the Queen's Coronation Medal in 1953, and was honoured with an Australian postage stamp in 1968.

Namatjira was the first recorded Northern Territory Aboriginal person to be freed from restrictions that made Aboriginal people wards of the state when he was granted full rights of citizenship in 1957. This gave him the right to vote in national, state and territory elections, gave him freedom of movement and freed him from restrictions on buying alcohol; but, in the Northern Territory, he still had limited land rights. However, Namatjira remained poorly treated by the government; he was sentenced to prison after leaving a bottle of rum on the back seat of his car, which was likely taken and consumed by a man who had then drunkenly beaten and killed his own wife. Public and international outcry intervened in the liability ruling and Namatjira instead served less than two months in a native reserve in Papunya. He continued to live in Papunya with his wife, until he died of heart disease in an Alice Springs hospital in 1959.

Described as a "monumental figure" within Australian art, Namatjira is considered one of the most talented Arrernte artists to have lived. As one of the foremost painters of the Hermannsburg movement, he blended indigenous landscapes and Western-style painting techniques to "bring central Australia to life, for thousands who had never seen it for themselves." His legacy lives on through international critical acclaim, the naming of his homeland's electorate after him, and his artistically inclined descendants. They form the artistic and memorial collective the Namatjira project, which includes his Ramsay Prize and Archibald Prize-winning great-grandson Vincent Namatjira.

== Early life ==
He was born at Hermannsburg Mission, Ntaria, in Alice Springs in 1902, the son of Jonathan Namatjira. They were Western Arrernte people.

Namatjira was raised on the Hermannsburg Mission and baptised after his parents' adoption of Christianity. He was born as Elea, but once baptised, they changed his name to Albert. As a child, he sketched what he saw around him. After a western-style upbringing on the mission, including attending the school and living in a dormitory, separated from his parents, at the age of 13 Namatjira returned to the bush for initiation and was exposed to traditional culture and initiated as a member of the Arrernte community (in which he was to eventually become an elder).

When he was 18 years old, he left the mission and married his wife Ilkalita, a Kukatja woman, who was christened Rubina upon their return to Hermannsburg. They had five sons and three daughters.

His wife, like his father's wife, was from the wrong skin group and he violated the law of his people by marrying outside the classificatory kinship system. In 1928 he was ostracised for several years in which he worked as a camel driver and saw much of Central Australia, which he was later to depict in his paintings. He also worked as a blacksmith, carpenter and stockman, at the mission and at the surrounding cattle stations.

He was a cousin of Aboriginal country music star Gus Williams, and is credited with bringing music into Williams' life.

== Career ==
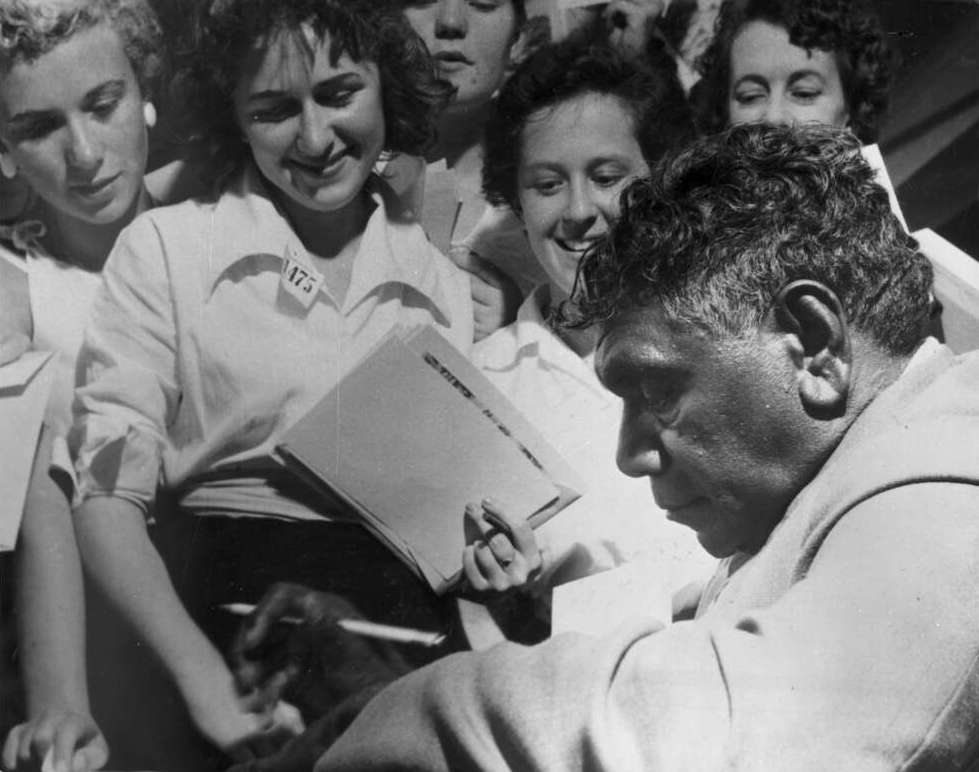
Namatjira signing autographs, c. 1950

Namatjira was introduced to western-style painting through a charity art exhibition in 1933, which raised the money to bring fresh water to his hometown of Hermannsburg. The exhibition was run by Violet Teague, whom Namatjira admired enough to name his daughter after, and her sister Una.

In 1934, Namatjira met Rex Battarbee and John Gardner, who had an exhibition at his mission. Battarbee returned to the area in the winter of 1936 to paint the landscape, and Namatjira, expressing an interest in learning to paint, acted as his cameleer and guide to show him local scenic areas.

Namatjira started painting in a unique style. His landscapes normally highlighted both the rugged geological features of the land in the background, and the distinctive Australian flora in the foreground with very old, stately and majestic white gum trees surrounded by twisted scrub. His work had a high quality of illumination showing the gashes of the land and the twists in the trees. His colours were similar to the ochres that his ancestors had used to depict the same landscape, but his style was appreciated by Europeans because it met the aesthetics of western art.

In his early career, Namatjira's work included tjuringa (sacred object) designs, biblical themes and figurative subjects, and he also carved and painted various artefacts.

In 1937 Friedrich Albrecht, superintendent of Hermannsburg, took ten of Namatjira's watercolours with him to a Lutheran conference at Nuriootpa, South Australia, and Battarbee put three of his paintings in an exhibition with the Royal South Australian Society of Arts in Adelaide. In 1938, Namatjira held his first solo exhibition in Melbourne.

He became the first prominent Aboriginal artist to work in a contemporary western style, and thus regarded as an example of assimilation. In 1944 he was included in Who's Who in Australia.

Subsequent exhibitions in Sydney and Adelaide also sold out. His work garnered wide acclaim, both in Australia and in other countries. Queen Elizabeth II became one of his more notable fans and he was awarded the Queen's Coronation Medal in 1953 and met her in Canberra in 1954. He was elected an honorary member of the Royal Art Society of New South Wales in 1955.

Not only did his own art become widely recognised, but a painting of him by William Dargie won the Archibald Prize in 1956, the first painting of an Aboriginal person to win the prize.

== Artworks, style and critical reception ==
Central Australian Landscape

Namatjira's artworks were colourful and varied depictions of the Australian landscape. One of his first landscapes from 1936, Central Australian Landscape, shows a land of rolling green hills. Another early work, Ajantzi Waterhole (1937), shows a close up view of a small waterhole, with Namatjira capturing the reflection in the water. The landscape becomes one of contrasting colours, a device that is often used by Western painters, with red hills and green trees in Red Bluff (1938). Central Australian Gorge (1940) shows detailed rendering of rocks and reflections in the water. In Flowering Shrubs Namatjira contrasts the blossoming flowers in the foreground with the more barren desert and cliffs in the background. Namatjira's love of trees was often described so that his paintings of trees were more portraits than landscapes, which is shown in the portrait of the often depicted ghost gum in Ghost Gum Glen Helen (c. 1945–49).

His unique style of painting was denounced soon after his death by some critics as being a product of his assimilation into western culture, rather than his own connection to his subject matter or his natural style. This view has, however, been largely abandoned.

Although Namatjira's paintings appear similar to conventional European landscapes, his work was imbued with his feeling for country and sacred sites. He used repetition, intricate patterns and high horizons to blend the styles of the two worlds he lived in.

The Art Gallery of New South Wales website quotes George Alexander, coordinator of Contemporary Art Programmes:

Initially thought of as having succumbed to European pictorial idioms – and for that reason, to ideas of European privilege over the land – Namatjira's landscapes have since been re-evaluated as coded expressions on traditional sites and sacred knowledge. Ownership of country is hereditary, but detailed knowledge of what it 'contains' is learnt in successive stages through ceremony, song, anecdote and contact. Namatjira's father's country lay towards Mount Sonder and Glen Helen Gorge, in the MacDonnell Ranges, and his mother's country was in the region of Palm Valley in Central Australia. In Namatjira's paintings, the totemic connections to his country are so indelible that, for example, Palm Valley the place and Palm Valley, c.1940s, the painting seem to intersect, detailing Namatjira's artistic, cultural and proprietorial claim on the land.

— Alexander, George, Tradition today: Indigenous art in Australia (2014)

In 2022, Namatjira's work enjoyed a surge in popularity that exceeded the general increased interest in Australian art at this time. Glen Helen Gorge sold for more than A$120,000 in Melbourne, and in July The Granseur – Mount Sonda fetched A$54,000 in Adelaide. The latter was a record price, achieving nearly A$10,000 more than had been expected.

== Later life ==
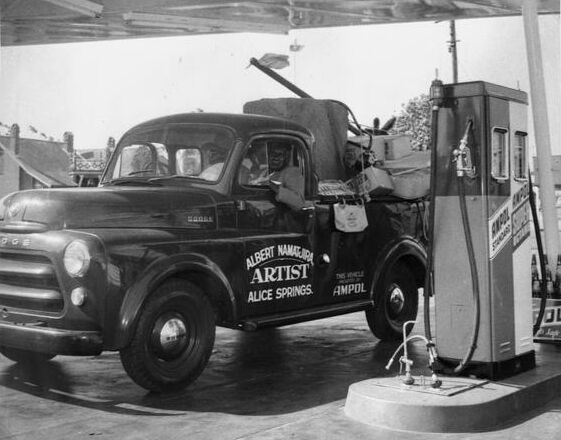
Namatjira on his way to Alice Springs

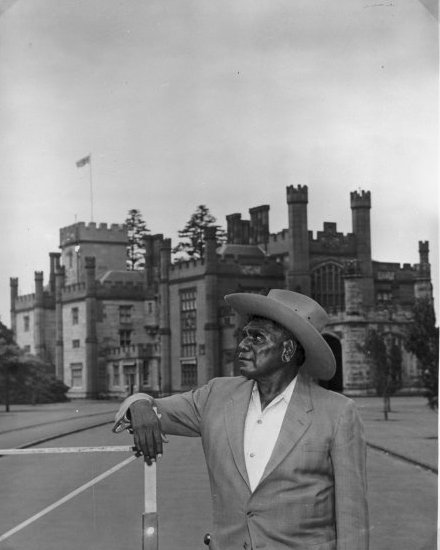
Namatjira outside Government House, Sydney, c. 1947

Due to his wealth, Namatjira soon found himself the subject of humbugging, a ritualised form of begging. Arrernte are expected to share everything they own, and as Namatjira's income grew, so did his extended family. At one time he was singlehandedly providing for over 600 people with financial support. To ease the burden on his strained resources, Namatjira sought to lease a cattle station to benefit his extended family. Originally granted, the lease was subsequently rejected because the land was part of a returned servicemen's ballot, and also because he had no ancestral claim on the property. He then tried to build a house in Alice Springs, but was cheated in his land dealings. The land he was sold was on a flood plain and was unsuitable for building. The Minister for Territories, Paul Hasluck, offered him free land in a reserve on the outskirts of Alice Springs, but this was rejected, and Namatjira and his family took up residence in a squalid shanty at Morris Soak, a dry creek bed some distance from Alice Springs which is now the location of one of the town camps. Despite the fact that he was held as one of Australia's greatest artists, Namatjira was living in poverty. His plight became a media cause célèbre, resulting in a wave of public outrage.

In 1957 the government exempted Namatjira and his wife from the restrictive legislation that applied to Aboriginal people in the Northern Territory.

Namatjira was encouraged to apply for full rights of citizenship at 55 years of age, allowing him to vote, own land, build a house and buy alcohol unlike other Indigenous Australians in the Northern Territory. He was then exempt from classification as an 'Aboriginal' for the purposes of the Welfare Ordinance 1953. This did not mean that he was legally not an Aboriginal, as some sources mistakenly suggest. However, his adult children and other relatives remained as "wards" under the Welfare Ordinance 1953. Although Albert and Rubina were legally allowed to drink alcohol, his Aboriginal family and friends were not. This artificial social divide and the Arrernte culture that expected him to share everything he owned brought Namatjira into conflict with the law.

When an Aboriginal woman, Fay Iowa, was killed at Morris Soak, Namatjira was held responsible by stipendiary magistrate, Jim Lemaire, for bringing alcohol into the camp. He was reprimanded at the coronial inquest. In the Northern Territory at that time, it was against the law to supply alcohol to an Aboriginal person. Namatjira was charged with leaving a bottle of rum in a place, i.e. on a car seat, where a clan brother and fellow Hermannsburg artist Henoch Raberaba, could get access to it. Convicted for an offence under the Welfare Ordinance 1953, for supplying an Aboriginal (a "ward") with liquor, he was sentenced to six months in prison. Namatjira appealed against the conviction to the Supreme Court of the Northern Territory (with his defence supported by the Council for Aboriginal Rights in Victoria). The Supreme Court upheld the conviction but reduced the sentence from six to three months. The High Court of Australia refused an application to appeal. There was widespread sympathy for Namatjira and negative publicity about the operation of the Ordinance across Australia and abroad. After the public uproar, the Minister for Territories, Paul Hasluck, intervened and the sentence was served at Papunya Native Reserve. He was released after only serving two months due to medical and humanitarian reasons.

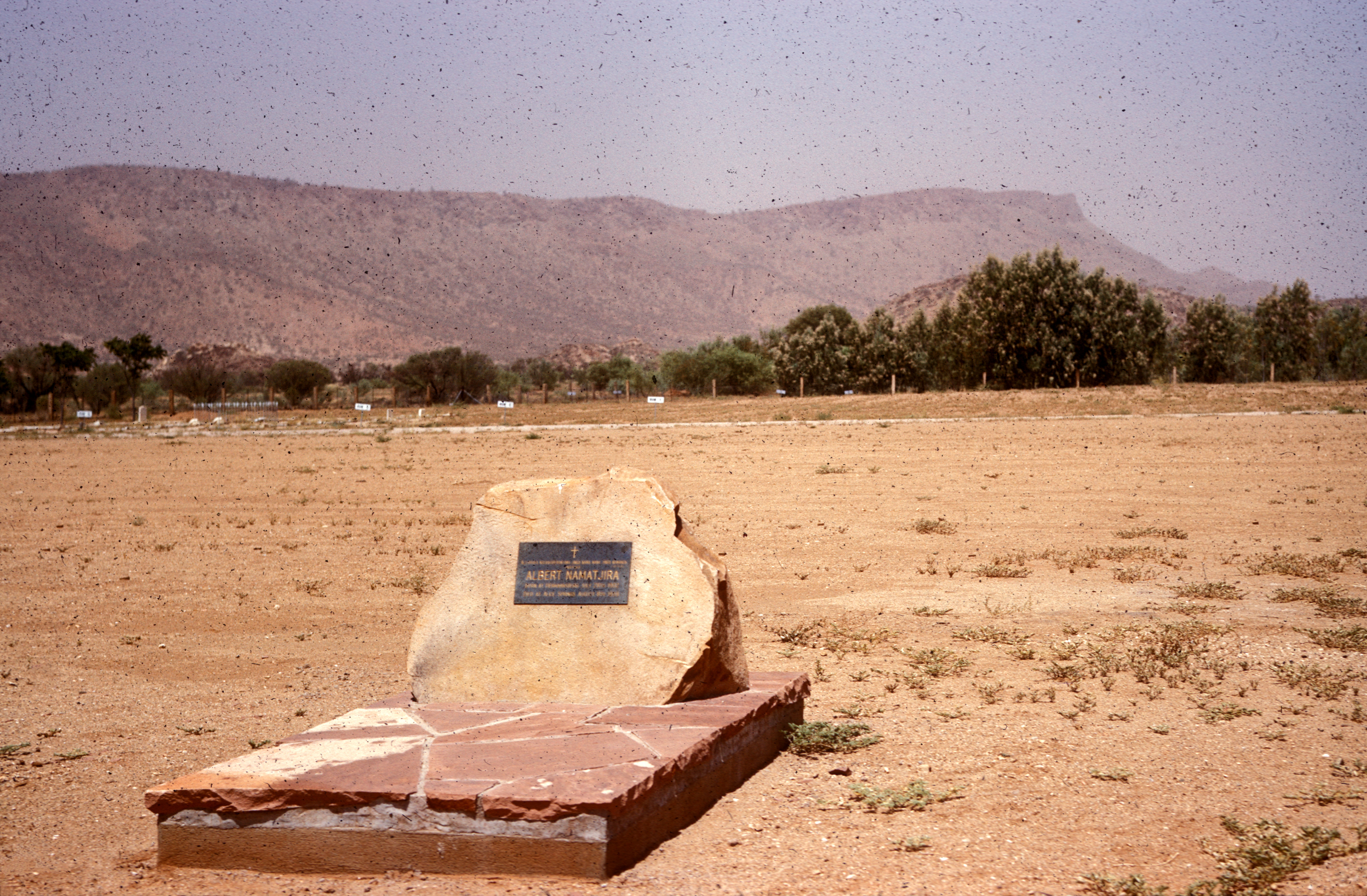
Albert Namatjira's grave at the Memorial Cemetery in Alice Springs (Mparntwe).

=== Final years and death ===
Despondent after his incarceration, Namatjira continued to live with Rubina in a cottage at Papunya, where he suffered a heart attack. There is evidence that Albert thought that he had the bone pointed at him by a member of Fay Iowa's family (this idea of being "sung" to death was also held by Frank Clune, a popular travel writer, Aboriginal activist and organiser of Albert's whirlwind 1956 trip). After being transferred to Alice Springs hospital, Namatjira astonished his mentor Rex Battarbee by presenting him with three landscapes, with a promise of more to come; a promise unrealised. Namatjira died soon after of heart disease complicated by pneumonia on 8 August 1959 in Alice Springs.

== Legacy ==
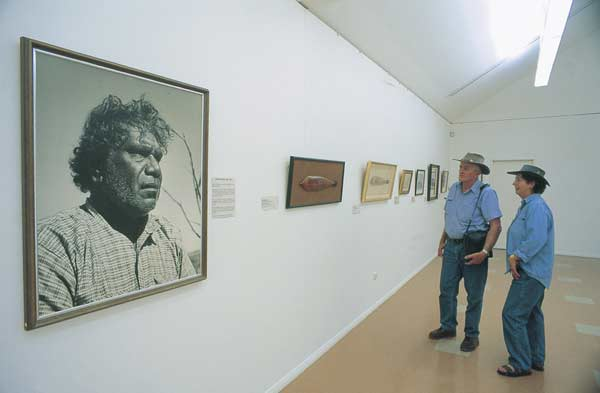
Albert Namatjira Gallery, Alice Springs

=== Work ===
At the time of his death Namatjira had painted a total of around 2,000 paintings. He is hailed today as one of the greatest Australian artists and a pioneer for Aboriginal rights. Namatjira's work is on public display in some of Australia's major art galleries. The Art Gallery of New South Wales now displays a number of Namatjira's work, although Hal Missingham, then Director of the gallery, initially rejected his work, saying: "We'll consider his work when it comes up to scratch".

Two years before his death, part of Namatjira's copyright was sold to a company in exchange for royalties. After his death, Albert Namatjira's copyright was sold by the public trustee in 1983 for A$8,500, despite Namatjira's will leaving his copyright to his widow and children. The copyright was returned to the family's Albert Namatjira Trust in an October 2017 deal enabled by a donation by philanthropist Dick Smith, in the name of art dealer John Brackenreg, who was seen as having acquired the rights to Namatjira's art in 1957 in an act of exploitation.

=== Official ===
Namatjira was honoured on postage stamps issued by Australia Post in 1968, again in 1993 with examples of his work, and in the Namatjira Centenary stamp series in 2002.

The Northern Territory electoral division of Namatjira, which surrounds Alice Springs, was renamed in 2012 from MacDonnell, in honour of Namatjira.

State Route 2, west of Alice Springs, is named Namatjira Drive after Namatjira, as is Namatjira Park in Clayton, Victoria.

In January 2013, two gum trees that featured prominently in Namatjira's watercolours were destroyed in an arson attack, while they were in the process of being heritage-listed, in an "appalling and a tragic act of cultural vandalism". In 2015, the Twin Gums site was again nominated for heritage listing.

=== In the arts ===
A number of biographical films have been made about Namatjira (at least three before his death), including the 1947 documentary Namatjira the Painter.

Namatjira has been the subject of numerous songs. Country star Slim Dusty was the first artist to record a tribute song, "Namatjira", in the 1960s, and Rick and Thel Carey followed up with their tribute "The Stairs That Namatjira Climbed" in 1963. Other tributes include John Williamson's "Raining on the Rock" from his 1986 album Mallee Boy and "The Camel Boy" from Chandelier of Stars (2005); "Albert Namatjira" by the Australian band Not Drowning, Waving, featured on their 1993 album, Circus, and Midnight Oil's song "Truganini" of the same year; the famous patriotic song "I Am Australian"; Archie Roach's song, "Native Born"; and the reconciliation song, "Namatjira", written by Geoff Drummond and included on the politically activist album, The Chess Set released by Pat Drummond in 2004.

He appeared as himself in the feature film The Phantom Stockman.

The Namatjira Project was a community cultural development project launched in 2009 that included an award-winning theatre production by Big hART focusing on Namatjira's life and work.

On 28 July 2017, Google commemorated Namatjira's 115th birthday with a featured Doodle for Australian users, acknowledging his substantial contributions to the art and culture of Australia.

=== Descendants ===
A number of Albert Namatjira's descendants paint at the Iltja Ntjarra - Many Hands art centre in Alice Springs.

Vincent Namatjira, Albert Namatjira's great-grandson, is a well-known artist in his own right, winning the A$100,000 Ramsay Art Prize in 2019. Vincent's 2014 series, Albert's Story, reflects on Albert Namatjira's life and legacy. About the series, Vincent has stated: "I hope my grandfather would be quite proud, maybe smiling down on me; because I won't let him go. I just keep carrying him on, his name and our families' stories." The series comprises 13 artworks, telling the story of Albert's life. Vincent's work was also shortlisted for the Archibald Prize in 2017, 2018 and 2019 and won the prize in 2020. Vincent's 2021 book about his great-grandfather, featuring artworks from Albert's Story, was shortlisted for a 2022 Australian Book Industry Award in the "Small Publishers' Children's Book of the Year" category.

== See also ==
- Namatjira Project
- Elliott Ronald Bull, aboriginal artist whose works have often been compared to those of Namatjira.
- Records relating to Albert Namatjira held by the National Archives
- Welfare files of Albert Namtjira at Library & Archives NT
