= Rex Battarbee =

Australian artist

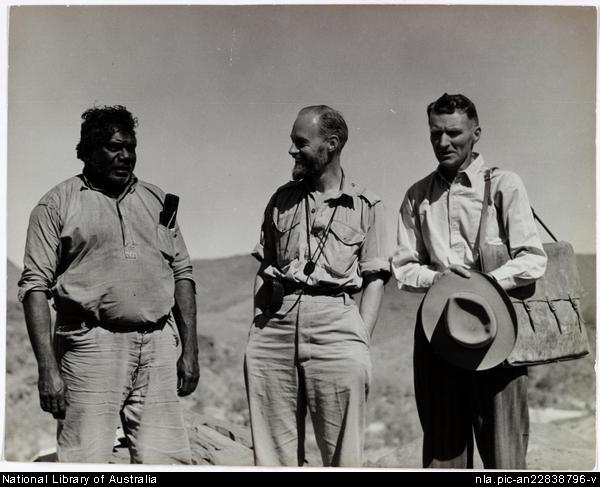
Portrait of Rex Battarbee (right) with Albert Namatjira (l.) and Axel Poignant (c.), 1946.

Reginald Ernest Battarbee, OBE (16 December 1893 – 2 September 1973) was an Australian artist notable for painting landscapes of Central Australia, and for teaching Aboriginal artist Albert Namatjira to paint.

== Early career ==
Rex Battarbee was born in Warrnambool, Victoria, and educated at the local state school and at Warrnambool Academy. In January 1916, he enlisted in the Australian Imperial Force and joined the 58th Battalion in France. During the fighting at Bullecourt, he was shot through the chest, face and both arms. He was invalided to Australia and hospitalized until late 1920; his left arm remained crippled. Unable to resume farmwork, in 1921–23 Battarbee studied commercial art in Melbourne, but developed a preference for the outdoor life of a landscape painter.

== In Outback Australia ==
In 1928, Battarbee and fellow commercial artist John Gardner bought a T-model Ford which had been converted to a caravan and set out on a fifteen-month trip, painting in Victoria, New South Wales and Queensland. Two years later they travelled to western New South Wales and the Flinders Ranges in South Australia. Their work appeared in successful exhibitions in Melbourne and Sydney. On an expedition to South and Central Australia in 1932, they showed their paintings at the Hermannsburg Lutheran mission, on the Finke River, west of Alice Springs in the Northern Territory. Returning to the area in 1934 to paint the Macdonnell and James ranges, Battarbee and Gardner again displayed their work at Hermannsburg—this time for the benefit of the Arrernte people. The representation of places familiar to the Indigenous people had great impact; among the viewers was Albert Namatjira, then known simply as Albert, who asked for materials in order to do his own painting.

== With Albert Namatjira ==
Battarbee and Gardner's brightly coloured landscapes attracted notice in Melbourne art circles, and they became prolific exhibitors and writers about inland Australia; in 1934 Battarbee won a Victorian centenary art prize for watercolour. He undertook his third visit to Central Australia in 1936 and found Albert Namatjira still waiting for him at the mission. With the permission of the superintendent Pastor Friedrich Albrecht, Battarbee employed Namatjira as camel-boy during excursions, each of one month, to Palm Valley and the Macdonnell Ranges. Battarbee taught Namatjira basic watercolour painting, and was astonished and inspired by his pupil's aptitude. He included three of Namatjira's works in his 1937 Royal South Australian Society of Arts showing in Adelaide and next year arranged a solo exhibition for him at the Fine Art Society Gallery, Melbourne.

== Life in Alice Springs ==
About 1940, Battarbee moved permanently to Central Australia. He conducted classes for an expanding group of Aboriginal artists and arranged further exhibitions of Namatjira's paintings in the southern capitals. As the Hermannsburg school of watercolourists developed, Battarbee became its promoter and helped to regulate the supply and distribution of its works to art markets. He was a member (from 1943) and chairman (1951–1956) of the Aranda Arts Council and a member of the two advisory committees also formed to protect the artists' interests. During the Second World War the authorities considered closing Hermannsburg on the ground that its German staff constituted a security risk. A compromise was reached, however, and in 1942 Battarbee was appointed a protector of Aborigines and Commonwealth government officer overseeing the mission. There, on 7 October 1950, he married with Lutheran forms 30-year-old Ada Bernice Loone, a Baptist lay missionary. Pastor Albrecht conducted the service.

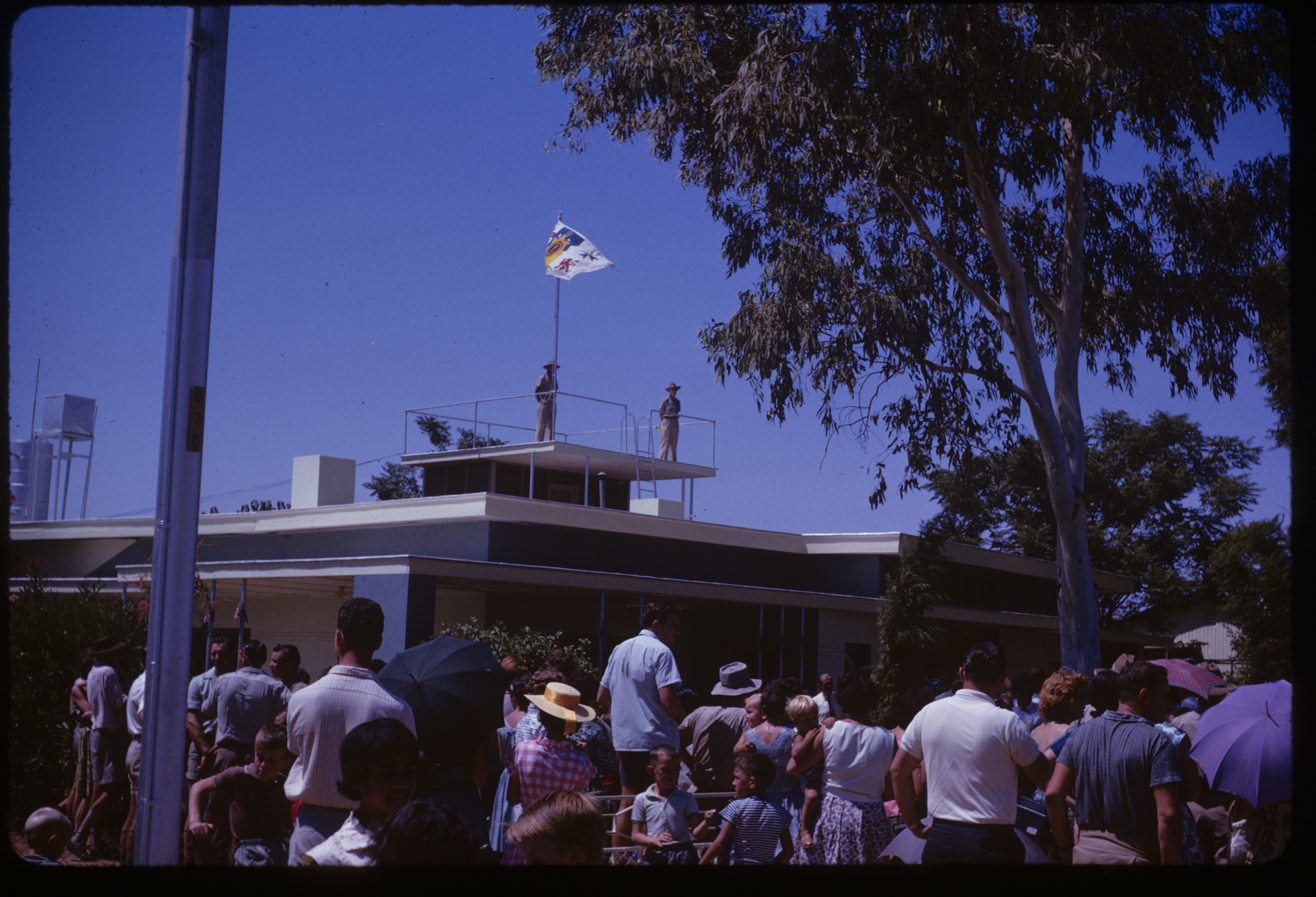
The Battarbee's home in Alice Springs (Mparntwe) during a royal visit in 1963

The Battarbees lived at Alice Springs and opened an Aboriginal art gallery, Tmara-mara, in their home. Rex continued to paint and exhibit. In 1964–66 Bernice ran the Battarbee Centralian Arts gallery, Adelaide, while her husband was briefly a patient in the Repatriation General Hospital, Daw Park. Returning to Alice Springs, Battarbee was appointed an Officer of the Order of the British Empire in 1971 for his services to art and Aboriginal peoples. He had been attracted to Central Australia by the variety and luminosity of colours to be found in the region. Although he believed that he had a sound sense of colour and that his best paintings would be remembered, he also expressed the view that his discovery of Namatjira would outlive the memory of his own art. Battarbee was a fellow (1937) of the Royal South Australian Society of Arts. he wrote Modern Australian Aboriginal Art (Sydney, 1951) and — with his wife — Modern Aboriginal Paintings (Adelaide, 1971). Survived by his son and daughter, he died on 2 September 1973 in the Old Timers' Home, Alice Springs, and was buried with Methodist forms in the town's cemetery. His work is represented in the Art Gallery of South Australia and the National Gallery of Victoria. Battarbee Street in the Canberra suburb of Conder is named in his honour.

== Published works ==
- Battarbee, Rex (1951). Modern Australian Aboriginal Art. Angus & Robertson, Sydney.
- Battarbee, Rex and Bernice (1971). Modern Aboriginal Painting. Rigby, Adelaide.
