= Humbug (Aboriginal) =

Slang term meaning "begging" in some Indigenous Australian communities

In Australian Aboriginal and Torres Strait Islander communities, humbug is a slang term referring to making unreasonable or excessive demands from one's family or other connections.

While resource-sharing is a common cultural practice among Aboriginal communities, "humbugging" has a negative connotation and is distinct from the traditions of sharing and strong sense of community Aboriginal culture is based upon. Examples of humbugging can range from family arguments and stress related to family obligations to abuse and theft. Not responding to the requests or demands of humbugging can result in assault and payback violence.

Humbugging stems from a variety of factors, including the socioeconomic context and cultural context of Aboriginal communities. It is also closely associated with elder abuse, in particular with financial elder abuse as a prevalent examples of how humbugging occurs. The issue of humbugging has been explored in community legal centres, banks and financial institutions as well as in government inquiries.

== Etymology ==
In broader English, the word "humbug" refers to something or someone that is dishonest or misleading and behaviour, writing or talk that is intentionally deceiving. For example, in Charles Dickens' 1843 novella A Christmas Carol, the main character Ebenezer Scrooge exclaims "Bah! Humbug!" to express his displeasure.

However, in Australian Aboriginal English, "humbug" is used in a general manner to refer to irritating or pestering someone. While there is not one specific or accepted universal definition of humbug, it can also be understood as making unreasonable demands from one's family or other connections in a troublesome and aggravating way. The term can also refer to demands that are repetitive and often accompanied by threats or abuse if the demands are not met.

== Background ==
The causes of humbugging are multifaceted and may include the socioeconomic and cultural context of Aboriginal communities. The cultural norms of resource-sharing and shared wealth put financial stability at an increased risk of abuse. While resource-sharing may be a positive act of support in normal instances, it can also lead to increased financial stress. Especially from elderly Aboriginal people, coercion into unlawfully assisting others through family ties or connections may put them at risk of financial elder abuse.

Demand sharing, also referred to as community obligation, is a large part of Aboriginal communities and is characterized by strong ties to kinship and obligations. In Indigenous culture, sharing is based upon a strong sense of community and service that has been traditional and is an act that sustains social relations within the community. Further, it is one based upon reciprocity and mutual generosity. However, the introduction of Western money systems into this traditional conception of sharing has only come about relatively recently. Due to this, the sharing of money becomes an adapted version of traditional resource sharing, where its used as a gesture to show support and care for one's family and broader community. As these two economic perspectives of Western capitalism and traditional sharing and obligations are fundamentally different, the incompatibilities within the systems may lead to phenomena such as humbugging arising. Humbugging is a reflection of traditional Aboriginal cultural practices, however, may also lead to the exploitation of kinship needs and resource-sharing that is commonly valued in Indigenous culture, especially for the older generation.

Further, as the definition of humbugging is unclear and there is no one consensus meaning, what some communities may see as acceptable humbugging is instead more serious incidents of harassment. For instance, in one study, participants regarded financial support in the form of giving others cash and paying for their goods and services as a cultural norm. Thus, the study reports that more insights are needed to better represent how Aboriginal communities understand wealth, demand sharing and their financial situation.

Barriers that Aboriginal and Torres Strait Islander peoples face include, but are not limited to, a lack of access and knowledge about traditional financial services and products, distrust for available financial services and the existing financial services being too costly. Due to the expectations and cultural context of resource-sharing, culturally specific forms of financial abuse may arise. Thus, there is emphasis on the need to create financial products that are aligned in culture and value to traditional practices of kinship relations and demand sharing. This may include financial services and institutes investing in increasing financial literacy within Aboriginal communities, more accessible explanations in plain language English and an alignment of cultural perspective when communicating financial advice to Indigenous audiences.

Family humbug is also identified as a main source of concern for Aboriginal communities' family worries. In a survey investigating Aboriginal family support and mental health, family arguments about money, food, drugs and strained family relations were identified as a key tension. One approach to mitigating family arguments and humbug has been motivational counselling, which provides a holistic stance to addressing worries and is able to be culturally adapted. This method has proven successful, however is largely dependent on familial support surrounding the individual.

There are also long-standing systemic and structural issues that lead to the prominence of humbugging. This includes the extensive and severe financial stress Indigenous households experience compared to their non-Indigenous counterparts. Overall, in addressing Indigenous exclusion in the long-term, incremental and sustained structural reform is needed.

== Elder abuse ==
The concept of humbugging is closely associated with elder abuse, due to humbugging prominently occurring from the younger generation towards the older generation. Financial abuse refers to domestic and family violence of an individual using money to gain authority or control of another in their relationship, for example, a partner, child or other family member.

In a 2020 survey from across the Kimberley, more than half of the respondents believed that "most elders are being humbugged or abused frequently". Due to the low financial literacy within Aboriginal elderly people, financial elder abuse may take form through the misuse of their individual pension allowances, carers allowances and other welfare payments. Vehicles of abuse also can include Centrepay, technology such as ATMs where theft can occur when an older person entrusts a family member to use the ATM on their behalf, and the lack of accessibility or digital literacy for online banking.

For instance, one example that the Kimberley Community Legal Services recounts describes the circumstances of humbugging surrounding an elder suffering from undiagnosed dementia. One of their family members claimed Carers Allowance without the knowledge of any other family members, and the elder's online banking was created by the family member so that they were in control of the elder's finances. While the elder was not provided any care or necessities, the family member profited from their allowance and pension, spending the money on items such as drugs, alcohol and clothing.

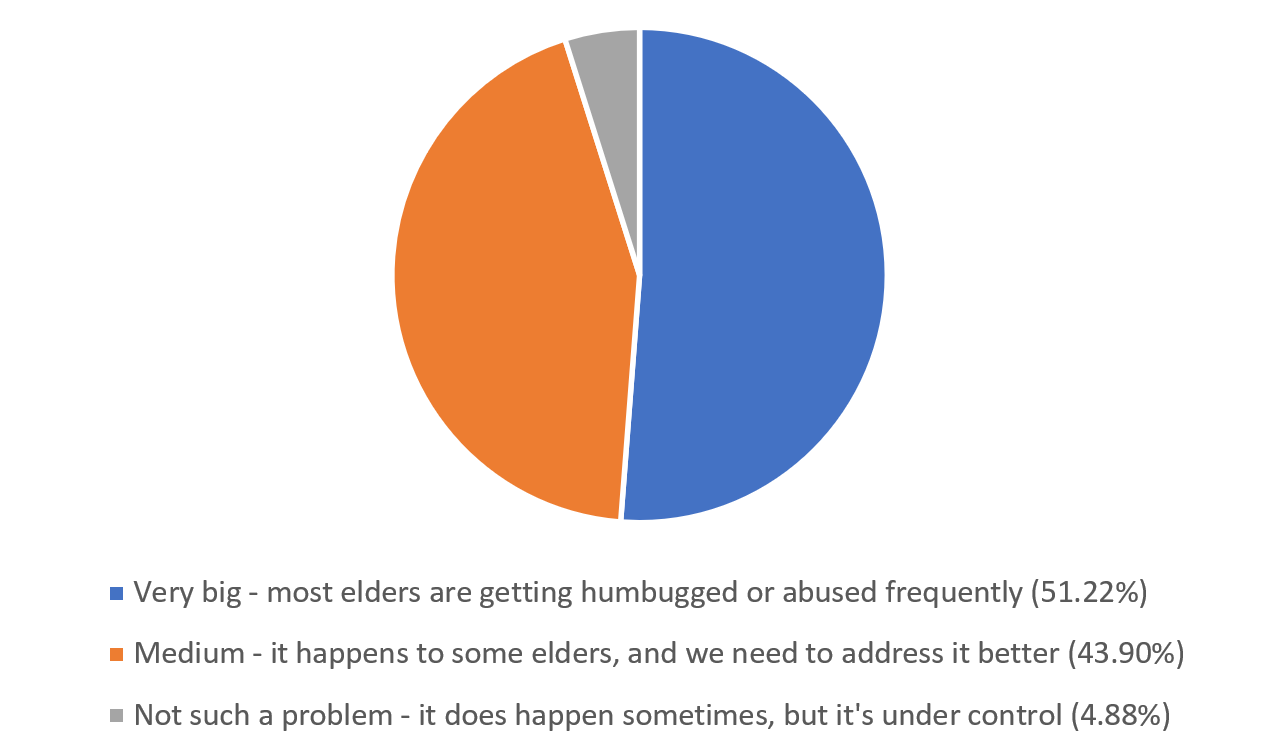
Most of the survey participants report that humbugging is a very big issue and happens frequently, while a substantial minority report that it happens to some elders and needs to be better addressed. A small minority do not regard it as an issue.

Online survey findings answering "In your experience, if an Elder is suffering financial abuse, who is it mainly coming from?"
Answers	Responses
Their children or grandchildren	92.68%
Their spouse or partner	34.15%
Other relatives	68.29%
Friends or acquaintances	31.71%
Services providers or businesses	19.51%

== Context and use ==
=== Government and advocacy ===
The Western Australia Select Committee into Elder Abuse submitted an inquiry into financial elder abuse, in particular focusing on the issue of humbugging. The inquiry and response addressed the role of the Commonwealth Government and State Government, as well as appropriate authorities such as Police, Child Protection and Family Support regarding humbugging.

The Commonwealth Government has taken action in various ways, including strategies such as compulsory and voluntary income management, and Cashless Debit Cards. However, there still remains several limitations at the state level. Due to the necessity for definitions of family violence from the Restraining Orders Act 7997 (WA) or if instances of humbugging do not meet the World Health Organization's definition of elder abuse, then the instances are not an issue that engages State Government strategies.

Further, even though such prevention strategies are being implemented, they are not always the most effective. A small-scale study focusing on income management in the Northern Territory found that many people had difficulty in understanding and using the BasicsCard, similar to a Cashless Debit Card, and felt that it did not aid them financially or alter their spending habits. While a significant minority in the survey reported that it did help them reduce humbugging, this cannot be generalized to the overall population. Overall, income management is reported to be able to provide a certain level of harm minimization which reduces, but cannot eliminate financial harassment and humbugging.

Advocacy and community support has also been important in addressing humbugging, given that it has a broad definition that do not fit one specific crime or violation. The Kimberley Community Legal Services is a significant example of an independent, non-profit organization that provides free legal and financial counselling to disadvantaged peoples across the Kimberley region. In 2020, they released a survey and report on financial elder abuse and humbugging.

=== Banks and financial institutions ===
There have been multiple initiatives by banks and financial institutes to address humbugging. These include reports on the topics of financial resilience and equity, as well as the general socioeconomic context of Aboriginal and Torres Strait Islander communities, to give further insight into humbugging. Both the Commonwealth Bank and National Australia Bank have partnered with academic or research organizations to release such reports.

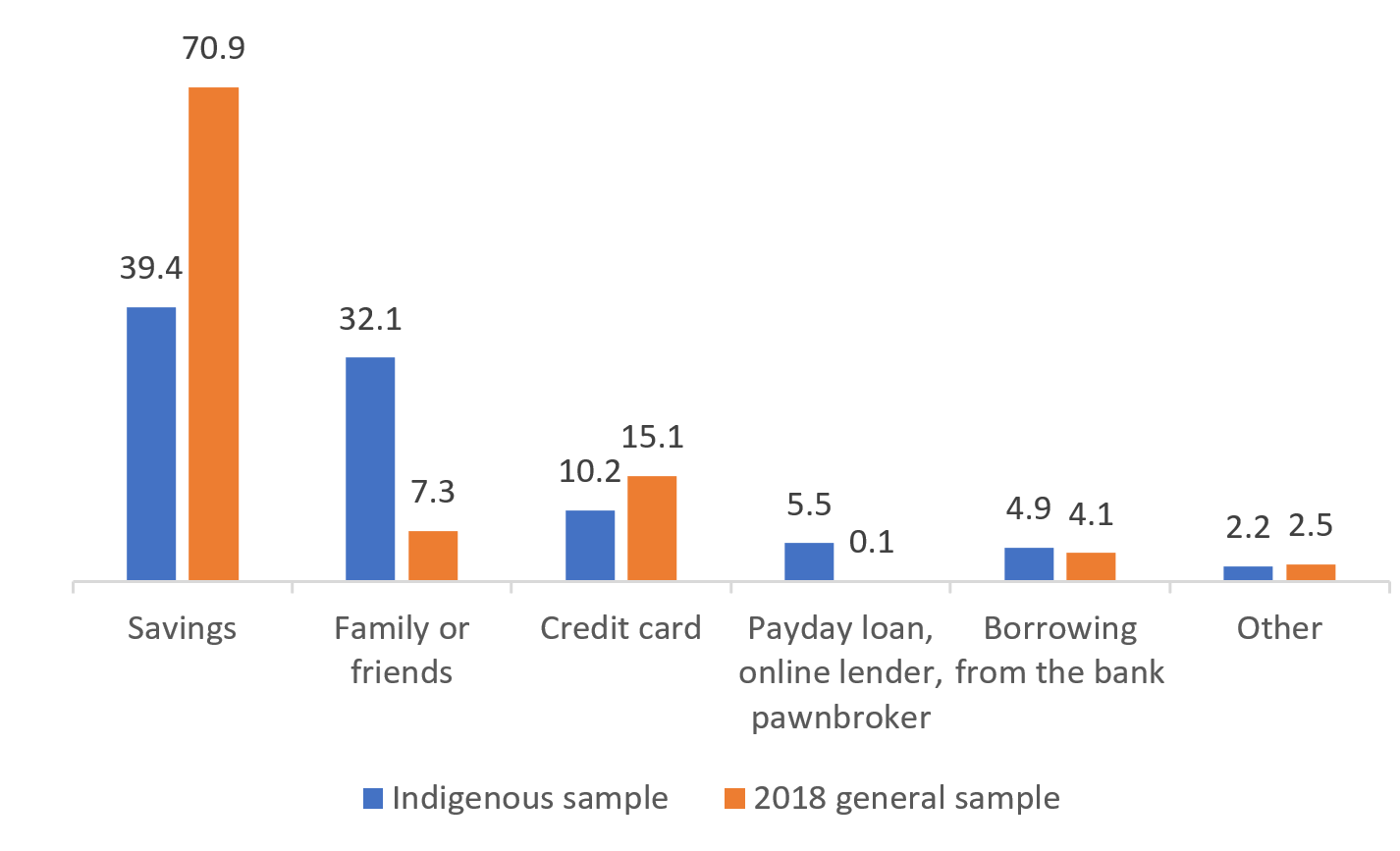
A comparison between where people receive $2000 a week from. The total Indigenous sample size was 244, weighted to be representative of the Australian Indigenous population aged 18+. The total sample size was 1,685, weighted to be representative of the Australian population aged 18+.

In one such report released by the National Australia Bank in partnership with the University of New South Wales, researchers found significant economic inequality between Indigenous and non-Indigenous people in Australia. This is evidenced by a survey showing that only 1 in 10 Indigenous Australians are financially secure and almost half (48.8%) as experiencing severe or high financial stress. This is in comparison to only 11% of the general population experiencing the same severe or high financial stress. Thus, Indigenous people are represented in much higher proportions within Australians dealing with financial stress and insecurity.

=== In media ===
Humbugging in music and pop culture can be found in Warumpi Band's 1996 album titled Too Much Humbug. They were an Australian Aboriginal rock band founded in the Northern Territory. One of their tracks from Too Much Humbug, "Stompin' Ground", was nominated for "Best Indigenous Release" in the 1997 ARIA Awards.
