= 13th Helpmann Awards =

2013 Australian live performance awards

- Date: 29 July 2013
- Location: Sydney Opera House
- Hosted by: Eddie Perfect, Christie Whelan-Browne

Television/radio coverage
- Network: Arena

The 13th Annual Helpmann Awards were held on 29 July 2013 at the Sydney Opera House, in Sydney. Administered by Live Performance Australia (LPA), accolades were handed out in 41 categories for achievements in theatre, musicals, opera, ballet, dance and concerts for productions shown between 1 March 2012 and 31 May 2013. The ceremony was broadcast live on Arena with Eddie Perfect and Christie Whelan-Browne hosting the event.

The nominations were announced by David Atkins, Christie Whelan-Browne, Chloe Dallimore, Sharon Millerchip, Catherine McClements, Simon Gallaher, Cameron Goodall, Rob Mills and Erika Heynatz on 23 June 2013. The Secret River received the most nominations with eleven including: Best Play, Best New Australian Work and Best Direction of a Play. King Kong, Legally Blonde and The Addams Family led the musical field with eight nominations each. Salome gained the most opera nominations with five, including Best Opera, and TERRAIN and Keep Everything were the most nominated dance works with four each.

Kylie Minogue and David Blenkinsop were the JC Williamson Award recipients, and Brian Stacey Memorial Trust was awarded to Carolyn Watson. White Night Melbourne was given the Best Special Event Award and a new prize was created for King Kong for Outstanding Theatrical Achievement.

== Winners and nominees ==
In the following tables, winners are listed first and highlighted in boldface. The nominees are those which are listed below the winner and not in boldface.

=== Theatre ===
Best Play	Best Direction of a Play
**The Secret River – Sydney Theatre Company** (Note: The full producing credit for The Secret River is Sydney Theatre Company in association with the Confederation of Australian International Arts Festivals, Sydney Festival, the Centenary of Canberra, Perth International Arts Festival); Death of a Salesman – Belvoir; Hedda Gabler – State Theatre Company of South Australia; Medea – Belvoir in association with Australian Theatre for Young People	**Neil Armfield – The Secret River**; Lee Lewis – The School for Wives (Bell Shakespeare); Rosemary Myers – School Dance (Windmill Theatre); Anne-Louise Sarks – Medea
Best Female Actor in a Play	Best Male Actor in a Play
**Alison Bell – Hedda Gabler**; Alison Bell – Constellations (Melbourne Theatre Company); Helen Thomson – Mrs. Warren's Profession (Sydney Theatre Company); Christen O'Leary – End of the Rainbow (Queensland Performing Arts Centre and Queensland Theatre Company)	**Colin Friels – Death of a Salesman**; John Bell – Henry 4 (Bell Shakespeare); Colin Moody – Forget Me Not (Belvoir); Nathaniel Dean – The Secret River
Best Male Actor in a Supporting Role in a Play	Best Female Actor in a Supporting Role in a Play
**Amber McMahon – School Dance**; Valerie Bader – Australia Day (Sydney Theatre Company and Melbourne Theatre Company); Lynette Curran – Cat on a Hot Tin Roof (Belvoir); Miranda Tapsell – The Secret River	**Colin Moody – The Secret River**; Patrick Brammall – Death of a Salesman; Rory Potter – Medea; Hayden Spencer – End of the Rainbow

=== Musicals ===
Best Musical
**Legally Blonde – Ambassador Theatre Group and John Frost** (Note: The full producing credit for Legally Blonde is Howard Panter for the Ambassador Theatre Group and John Frost for Gordon Frost Organisation.); A Funny Thing Happened on the Way to the Forum – John Frost; South Pacific – Opera Australia in association with John Frost; The Addams Family – Rodney Rigby (Note: The full producing credit for The Addams Family is Rodney Rigby, Stuart Oken, Roy Furman, Michael Leavitt, Five Cent Productions, Eva Price, Silvio Salom, Stuart Ditsky/Adam Ditsky, James Herbert, Arthur Hershaft, Cheryl Lachowicz, Mary Khoury, Mary Lu Roffe and Gian Christian by special arrangement with Elephant Eye Theatrical.)
Best Direction of a Musical	Best Choreography in a Musical
**Jerry Mitchell – Legally Blonde**; Simon Phillips – A Funny Thing Happened on the Way to the Forum; Bartlett Sher – South Pacific; Jerry Zaks – The Addams Family	**Jerry Mitchell – Legally Blonde**; Tony Bartuccio – Chess (The Production Company); Christopher Gattelli – South Pacific; Sergio Trujillo – The Addams Family
Best Female Actor in a Musical	Best Male Actor in a Musical
**Lucy Durack – Legally Blonde**; Chloe Dallimore – The Addams Family; Esther Hannaford – King Kong (Global Creatures); Silvie Paladino – Chess	**Geoffrey Rush – A Funny Thing Happened on the Way to the Forum**; David Harris – Legally Blonde; Wayne Scott Kermond – The Producers (The Production Company); John Waters – The Addams Family
Best Female Actor in a Supporting Role in a Musical	Best Male Actor in a Supporting Role in a Musical
**Helen Dallimore – Legally Blonde**; Erika Heynatz – Legally Blonde; Katrina Retallick – The Addams Family; Jennifer Vuletic – Chitty Chitty Bang Bang (Tim Lawson)	**Russell Dykstra – The Addams Family**; Chris Ryan – King Kong; Hugh Sheridan – A Funny Thing Happened on the Way to the Forum; Mike Snell – Legally Blonde

=== Opera and Classical Music ===
Best Opera	Best Direction of an Opera
**Salome – Opera Australia**; Die tote Stadt – Opera Australia; L'isola disabitata – Hobart Baroque and Royal Opera House; Un ballo in maschera – Opera Australia	**Àlex Ollé – Un ballo in maschera**; Gale Edwards – Salome; Ludger Engels – Semele Walk (Kunstfestspiele Herrenhausen and Sydney Festival); Rodula Gaitanou – L'isola disabitata
Best Female Performer in an Opera	Best Male Performer in an Opera
**Cheryl Barker – Salome**; Tamar Iveri – Un ballo in maschera; Sara Macliver – L'Orfeo (Brisbane Festival and Australian Brandenburg Orchestra); Emma Matthews – Lucia di Lammermoor (Opera Australia)	**John Wegner – Salome**; Giorgio Caoduro – Lucia di Lammermoor; Dmytro Popov – Carmen - Handa Opera on Sydney Harbour (Opera Australia); Byron Watson – Midnight Son (Victorian Opera)
Best Female Performer in a Supporting Role in an Opera	Best Male Performer in a Supporting Role in an Opera
**Jacqueline Dark – Salome**; Nicole Car – Carmen - Handa Opera on Sydney Harbour; Jessica Dean – Fidelio (State Opera of South Australia); Taryn Fiebig – La bohème (Opera Australia)	**José Carbo – Die tote Stadt**; Samuel Dundas – La bohème (Opera Australia); Wolf Matthais Friedrich – L'Orfeo; Douglas McNicol – Fidelio
Best Symphony Orchestra Concert	Best Chamber and Instrumental Ensemble Concert
**Das Rheingold** by **Richard Wagner**. **The Hamburg State Opera with the Hamburg Philharmonic (Queensland Performing Arts Centre)**; Beethoven 9 (Australian Chamber Orchestra); The Resurrection Symphony by Gustav Mahler. Soloists from the Hamburg State Opera with the Hamburg Philharmonic (Queensland Performing Arts Centre); The Queen of Spades by Pyotr Ilyich Tchaikovsky (Sydney Symphony Orchestra)	**Jordi Savall** and **Andrew Lawrence King**; Takács Quartet; Philip Glass Complete Piano Etudes; Steve Reich – A Celebration
Best Individual Classical Performance
**Simone Young conducting the Hamburg Philharmonic – The Resurrection Symphony by Gustav Mahler. Soloists from the Hamburg State Opera with the Hamburg Philharmonic**; Ana Vidović – Ana Vidovic in Recital; Jordi Savall – Jordi Savall and Andrew Lawrence King; Stuart Skelton – Tchaikovsky's Queen of Spades: An Opera in Concert

=== Dance and Physical Theatre ===
Best Visual or Physical Theatre Production	Best Ballet or Dance Work
**S – Circa**; Concrete and Bone Sessions – Branch Nebula and Performing Lines presented by Sydney Festival; It's Dark Outside by Tim Watts, Arielle Gray and Chris Isaacs – Perth Theatre Company; Murder – Erth Visual & Physical Inc, produced by Intimate Spectacle, presented by Adelaide Festival, Sydney Festival & Ten Days on the Island	**TERRAIN – Bangarra Dance Theatre**; Black Project 1 & 2 – Antony Hamilton Projects, Arts House & Insite Arts; Cacti – Sydney Dance Company; Keep Everything – Chunky Move
Best Choreography in a Ballet or Dance Work
**Anthony Hamilton – Black Project 1 & 2**; Anthony Hamilton – Keep Everything; Stephanie Lake – Dual; Frances Rings – TERRAIN
Best Female Dancer in a Dance or Physical Theatre Production	Best Male Dancer in a Dance or Physical Theatre Production
**Deborah Brown – TERRAIN (Bangarra Dance Theatre)**; Victoria Hunt – Copper Promises (Performance Space); Lauren Langlois – Keep Everything (Chunky Move); Amber Scott – Swan Lake (Baynes) (The Australian Ballet)	**Alisdair Macindoe – Dual (Stephanie Lake & Arts House)**; James O'Hara – Faun (STRUT dance and Eastman (Belgium)); Daniel Gaudiello – Don Quixote (The Australian Ballet); Alisdair Macindoe – Keep Everything (Chunky Move)

=== Contemporary Music ===
Best International Contemporary Concert	Best Australian Contemporary Concert
**Bruce Springsteen and the E Street Band – Wrecking Ball World Tour**; Tedeschi Trucks Band and Trombone Shorty; Coldplay – Mylo Xyloto Tour; Barry Gibb – Mythology Tour	**Neil Finn and Paul Kelly**; Gotye – Australian Tour; Into the Bloodstream: Archie Roach; Keith Urban – The Story So Far
Best Contemporary Music Festival
**The 24th Annual Bluesfest Byron Bay**; Falls Music & Arts Festival; Laneway Festival 2013; Vivid Live 2012 Program

=== Other ===
Best Presentation for Children	Best Regional Touring Production
**School Dance – Windmill Theatre**; Cautionary Tales for Children – Arena Theatre Company; The Yard – CAPTIVATE and Shaun Parker & Company; How High the Sky – Polyglot Theatre	**CIRCA – Performing Lines for Road Work**; of earth & sky – Bangarra Dance Theatre; The Land of Yes & The Land of No – Sydney Dance Company; The Disappearances Project – Version 1.0
Best Cabaret Performer	Best Comedy Performer
**Robyn Archer – Robyn Archer in Concert: Que Reste-t-il?**; Tommy Bradson – The Men My Mother Loved; Christopher Green – TINA C: Sorry Seems to be the Hardest Word; Mark Nadler – I'm a Stranger Here Myself	**Julia Morris – No Judgement**; Wil Anderson – GoodWil; Kitty Flanagan – Hello Kitty Flanagan; Hannah Gadsby – Happiness is a Bedside Table

=== Industry ===
Best New Australian Work
**Kate Grenville, an adaptation for the stage by Andrew Bovell – The Secret River**; Anh Do – The Happiest Refugee (A List Entertainment); Book by Craig Lucas, original music composed by Marius de Vries, featuring songs and original compositions by 3D from Massive Attack, Guy Garvey, Sarah McLachlan, Justice and The Avalanches with additional lyrics by Michael Mitnick and Richard Thomas – King Kong; Gordon Kerry and Louis Nowra – Midnight Son; Kate Mulvany and Anne-Louise Sarks – Medea; Matthew Whittet – School Dance
Best Original Score	Best Musical Direction
**Iain Grandage – The Secret River**; Marius de Vries (original music), Michael Mitnick and Richard Thomas (additional lyrics), featuring Songs and Original Compositions by 3D, Guy Garvey, Sarah McLachlan, Justice and The Avalanches – King Kong; David Page – TERRAIN (Bangarra Dance Theatre); Gordon Kerry and Louis Nowra – Midnight Son	**Iain Grandage – The Secret River**; Christian Badea – Die tote Stadt; James Morrison – Boundary Street (Black Swan State Theatre Company and Brisbane Festival); Tristen Parr – Duck, Death and the Tulip (Barking Gecko Theatre Company and Perth International Arts Festival)
Best Costume Design	Best Scenic Design
**Roger Kirk – King Kong**; Hugh Colman – Swan Lake (Baynes); Julian Crouch and Phelim McDermott – The Addams Family; Tess Schofield – The Secret River	**Peter England – King Kong**; Stephen Curtis – The Secret River; Jonathon Oxlade – School Dance; Amon Tobin – Amon Tobin ISAM: Live
Best Lighting Design	Best Sound Design
**Peter Mumford – King Kong**; Mark Howett – The Secret River; Paul Normandale – Coldplay – Mylo Xyloto Tour; John Rayment – Carmen	**Peter Hylenski – King Kong**; Tony David Cray – Die tote Stadt; Tony David Cray – Carmen; Luke Smiles – School Dance

== Special awards ==
The JC Williamson Award, awarded for one's life's work in Australia's live entertainment industry was given to Australian singer Kylie Minogue and arts philanthropist David Blenkinsop. Carolyn Watson received the Brian Stacey Award for emerging Australian conductors, and an additional $8000 prize. Victorian Major Events Company accepted the award for Best Special Event on behalf of the State Government of Victoria, for the White Night Melbourne festival. The award for Outstanding Theatrical Achievement was created by the Industry Awards Panel and Helpmann Awards Administration Committee for the "design, creation and operation of King Kong – the creature." The panel and administration felt that the "ground breaking Australian creation, the first of its kind in the world, was worthy of individual recognition."
