= The Secret River (play) =

Play by Andrew Bovell

- Original language: English
- Written by: Andrew Bovell
- Subject: The Secret River by Kate Grenville
- Genre: Drama

Premiere
- Date: 8 January 2013
- Place: Sydney Theatre

The Secret River is a play by Australian playwright Andrew Bovell, based upon the 2005 novel of the same name by Kate Grenville. It premiered in Sydney on 8 August 2013.

== Synopsis ==
Narrated by Dhirrumbin, the drama is about a man who is exiled from London in the eighteenth century, and is sent with his family to a penal colony in the Hawkesbury River, New South Wales, where he hopes to make a new start, but its Indigenous inhabitants, the Dharug people, are not willing to give up their land.

== Production ==
The play was first produced by the Sydney Theatre Company (STC).

Choreographer and then artistic director for Bangarra Dance Theatre, Stephen Page, was artistic associate for the production.

== Performances ==
=== 2013 ===
The STC production of The Secret River had its world premiere on 8 January 2013 at the Sydney Theatre as part of Sydney Festival. The cast included Nathaniel Dean, Trevor Jamieson, Daniel Henshall, Miranda Tapsell, and Ursula Yovich.

=== 2016 ===
A 2016 remount toured Sydney, Melbourne, and Brisbane.

=== 2017 ===
In March 2017, a co-production of the State Theatre Company of South Australia and the Sydney Theatre Company, co-directed by Neil Armfield and Geordie Brookman, was staged at Anstey Hill Quarry as part of the Adelaide Festival. The show was a record-breaking success, selling out all performances over its 18 nights, with an audience of 800 each night.

=== 2019 ===
It was scheduled to tour to Edinburgh International Festival and the Royal National Theatre in London in 2019.

== Characters ==
=== English settlers ===
- William Thornhill,
- Sal Thornhill, William’s wife
- Willie Thornhill, William and Sal's eldest son
- Dick Thornhill, William and Sal's second son
- Smasher Sullivan, a settler on the Hawkesbury River
- Thomas Blackwood, an ex-convict and tradesmen
- Loveday, a settler on the Hawkesbury River
- Dan Oldfield, Williams childhood friend
- Mrs Herring, a mid-wife and nurse
- Sagitty Birtles, Smasher Sullivan's crony
- Captain Suckling, alcoholic and landowner

=== Dharug people ===
- Dhirrumbin, a guide
- Dulla Djin
- Gillyagan
- Muruli
- Garraway, friend of Dick
- Yalamundi, elder of the tribe
- Buryia, female tribe elder
- Ngalamalum
- Wangarra, tribal warrior
- Branyimala, tribal warrior
- Narabi, friend of Dick
- Turnkey

== Original cast ==
The cast for the 2013 production included:

- Nathaniel Dean - William Thornhill
- Anita Hegh - Sal Thornhill
- Jeremy Sims - Smasher Sullivan
- Colin Moody - Thomas Blackwood
- Ursula Yovich - Dhirrumbin/Dulla Djin
- Miranda Tapsell - Gillyagan/Muruli
- Bruce Spence - Loveday
- Bailey Doomadgee and Kamil Ellis - Garraway
- Lachlan Elliott and Callum McManis - Willie Thornhill
- Rory Potter and Tom Usher - Dick Thornhill
- Roy Gordon - Yalamundi
- Daniel Henshall - Dan Oldfield
- Ethel-Anne Gundy – Buryia
- Trevor Jamieson - Ngalamalum
- Rhimi Johnson Page - Wangarra/Branyimala
- Judith McGrath - Mrs Herring
- James Slee - Narabi
- Matthew Sunderland - Sagitty Birtles/ Captain Suckling/Turnkey

== Awards and nominations ==
=== Helpmann awards ===
Year	Award Ceremony	Category	Nominee	Result
2013	13th Helpmann Awards	Best Play		Won
2013	13th Helpmann Awards	Best New Australian Work		Won
2013	13th Helpmann Awards	Best Direction of a Play	Neil Armfield	Won
2013	13th Helpmann Awards	Best Male Actor in a Play	Nathaniel Dean	Nominated
2013	13th Helpmann Awards	Best Male Actor in a Supporting Role in a Play	Colin Moody	Won
2013	13th Helpmann Awards	Best Female Actor in a Supporting Role in a Play	Miranda Tapsell	Nominated
2013	13th Helpmann Awards	Best Original Score	Iain Grandage	Won
2013	13th Helpmann Awards	Best Musical Direction	Iain Grandage	Won
2013	13th Helpmann Awards	Best Costume Design	Tess Schofield	Nominated
2013	13th Helpmann Awards	Best Scenic Design	Stephen Curtis	Nominated
2013	13th Helpmann Awards	Best Lighting Design	Mark Howett	Nominated
