= The Killing Game =

The Killing Game may refer to:

- "The Killing Game" (Star Trek: Voyager), a two-part episode from the fourth season of Star Trek: Voyager
- The Killing Game (1967 film), a French film
- The Killing Game (1978 film), a Japanese film directed by Tōru Murakawa
- The Killing Game (1988 film), an American film featuring Barry Foster
- The Killing Game (2011 film), an American action film retitled Arena
- "Killing Game", a song on the album Last Rights by Skinny Puppy
