= Bendigo Symphony Orchestra =

Australian regional orchestra

- Short name: BSO
- Founded: 1981
- Location: Bendigo, Australia
- Concert hall: Ulumbarra Theatre, Bendigo
- Principal conductor: Luke Severn
- Website: bendigosymphonyorchestra.org.au/

The Bendigo Symphony Orchestra (BSO) is a regional Australian semi-professional orchestra based in Bendigo, Victoria.

== History ==
The orchestra was formed in 1981 as a result of the Music 81 Project of the Victoria State Government, and was the successor of the Bendigo Concert Orchestra.

The inaugural concert was held on 20 September 1981 at the J. B. Osborne Theatre of Crusoe College at Kangaroo Flat and was conducted by John Hopkins.

== Musical Directors ==
- Simon Romanos (1981)
- Paul Baeyertz (1982–1983)
- David Lord (1984–1985)
- Wim Simmelink (1986–1989)
- Catherine Moore (1988–1991)
- Jean Lehmann OAM (1989–1992)
- Daniel Herbst (1992–2007)
- Rohan Phillips (2007–2019)
- Luke Severn (2019–)

== Commissioned works ==
Work name	Composer	First performance
In iubilo	Gordon Kerry	17 April 2011, Forest Street Uniting Church, Bendigo
Fade: Prelude for Orchestra	Rohan Phillips	25 March 2017, Castlemaine Town Hall, Castlemaine
Kati Thanda – Lake Eyre	Cally Bartlett	11 December 2021, Ulumbarra Theatre, Bendigo
