= Death of Maria Korp =

Australian victim of crime (1955–2005)

Maria Korp
- Born: Maria Matilde; 14 January 1955; Portugal
- Died: 5 August 2005 (aged 50); Melbourne, Victoria, Australia
- Body discovered: Kings Domain, Melbourne (car boot)
- Known for: Murder victim
- Spouse: Joe Korp (1991–2005; her death)

Maria Korp (born Maria Matilde; 14 January 1955 – 5 August 2005) was a Portuguese-born Australian woman reported missing for four days and later found, barely alive, in the boot of her car on 13 February 2005. She spent a short time in a coma before emerging into a state of post-coma unresponsiveness. She became the centre of a controversy in Australia during 2005. Depending upon their viewpoint, people have characterised the controversy as being about euthanasia or about human rights and protecting people with disabilities.

On 26 July 2005 Victoria's Public Advocate, Julian Gardner, announced that the feeding tube to Korp would cease to be used for providing artificial nutrition and hydration, that palliative care would be implemented and that she was expected to die within 7 to 14 days. Korp died on 5 August 2005. Her husband's mistress, Tania Herman, pleaded guilty on 8 June 2005 to attempted murder, and was sentenced to 12 years' imprisonment; husband Joe Korp, also charged with her attempted murder, died by suicide on the day of her funeral.

== Investigation ==
Joe Korp

The brother of Korp's husband, Gust Korp, had earlier reported his concerns about Korp's safety to police on 9 February 2005. Joe Korp stated he last saw his wife at their suburban Mickleham home at approximately 6:30 a.m. that day. Korp was later found unconscious, locked in the boot of her car near the Shrine of Remembrance in Dallas Brooks Drive, in Kings Domain, Melbourne on 13 February 2005. She was taken to nearby Alfred Hospital, and was found to have suffered oxygen starvation to the brain, head injuries and severe dehydration. She went into a medically induced coma, and was placed on life support.

On 16 February 2005, police charged Joe Korp, 47, and his mistress Tania Herman, 38, with the attempted murder of Korp, conspiracy to murder, and intentionally causing serious injury. Both appeared the following day in Melbourne Magistrates' Court and were remanded in custody. On 28 April 2005, the Victorian Civil and Administrative Tribunal appointed Victoria's Public Advocate, Julian Gardner as Korp's legal guardian.

Herman pleaded guilty on 8 June to the attempted murder of Korp (this charge was not upgraded to murder when Korp subsequently died) and was sentenced to 12 years' imprisonment with a non-parole period of nine years. Joe Korp pleaded not guilty on all charges and was later released on bail on 9 June, and committed to stand trial. A further charge of murder had been expected to be laid against him, and he had applied for bail modification so that he could visit his dying wife in hospital. Gardner, who had authority to determine access to Korp, approved a visit supervised by his staff and police.

== Euthanasia controversy ==
On 26 July, Gardner announced that medical treatment for Korp in the form of artificial nutrition and hydration would cease, that palliative care treatment would be provided and that she was expected to die within one to two weeks. Her condition had been declining, and medical staff could no longer stabilise her condition. "The treating team at the Alfred Hospital has advised me that her condition is now terminal", Gardner said.

Anti-euthanasia campaigners threatened legal action in an attempt to save Korp in August, 2005. They held peaceful protests outside Melbourne's Alfred Hospital to demonstrate against the "inhumane" decision by Gardner, to stop artificially feeding her. Korp's artificial nutrition and hydration was ceased on 27 July on the decision of Gardner, who stated that all of the doctors who had examined her (including a specialist independent of the hospital arranged by Gardner) had advised that further treatment other than palliative care was futile and that she had no prospects of recovery. He concluded on the basis of the medical evidence and on the basis of evidence of her beliefs and values that continued treatment was not in her best interests.

An appeal against Gardner's appointment—as a legal means of challenging his decision—as Korp's guardian was reportedly considered by opponents of his decision but no appeal was made. The protest group's spokesperson reported to the media that they would be willing to give anything a try in order to stop her from dying from starvation. Korp's husband had publicly stated through his lawyers that he would fight in the courts any attempt to withdraw medical treatment. It was for that reason that the hospital sought the appointment of a guardian. It was only after Gardner approved his visit to Korp that he changed his mind. Her daughter, Laura De Gois, indicated that she did not oppose Gardner's decision.

According to an ABC radio report, Gardner explained that they talked over a period of months to people who knew her well, including her priest, to find out what she believed, and took advice from "an expert Catholic ethicist". He was provided with details of the medical evidence and asked to consider whether, given that evidence of her medical condition, withdrawal of treatment other than palliative care would be in accordance with the statement on this issue by the former Pope in April 2004. He concluded that it would be. Many of her family members were against the cessation of life support. Their reasons were not publicly stated other than to claim that the doctors were wrong and that Korp was not dying. This was the basis of the comments by a family member in Portugal.

The controversy was heightened by the fact that it occurred at the end of the internationally publicised controversy about Terri Schiavo, an American woman in a vegetative state (for a decade or more longer than Korp) whose artificial treatment and hydration was ceased following a decision by her husband that was made after numerous court cases which ultimately confirmed his authority to do so. Although Gardner was at pains to state that the actions did not amount to euthanasia (he noted that medical treatment decisions such as this had been authorised by the Supreme Court, and that euthanasia was unlawful) the raw nerve that the case touched among many people did not stop some of those who either supported or opposed euthanasia characterising it as such.

== Aftermath ==
Korp died at 2 a.m. on Friday, 5 August 2005, and her funeral mass was held one week later. Forbidden by family to attend the service, Joe Korp invited the media to a private funeral ceremony at his home where he sang "Unchained Melody" and "The Lady in Red". That night he contacted his first wife and then a newspaper journalist, telling both that he intended to hang himself in his garage. Both contacted police who rushed to the house to find him standing on a ladder with a noose around his neck while talking on a mobile phone. According to the police report, he was looking at them through the garage window when the ladder tipped over. Police believe he may have been trying to regain his footing when the ladder fell. Surrounding his body were photographs of Korp, football memorabilia, and notes professing his innocence. The media reported that he was on the phone to his solicitor at the time he died and that the coroner's toxicology report indicated an alcohol reading of 0.15.

In January 2013, Herman applied for permission to marry fellow inmate Nicole Muscat. On 14 February 2014, Herman was released on parole after serving a little over eight years in the Dame Phyllis Frost maximum-security prison.

== In popular culture ==
The story was portrayed in the 2006 book The Maria Korp Case: The Woman in the Boot Story by Sunday Herald Sun journalist Carly Crawford. The book was later adapted into a 2010 television movie called Wicked Love: The Maria Korp Story, starring Rebecca Gibney as Maria Korp, Vince Colosimo as Joe Korp, and Maya Stange as Herman. It is narrated by Korp herself, from her point of view, as if from beyond the grave, detailing the events from the Korps' wedding to the beginning of Joe Korp's affair, and its consequences, while postulating the theory that her husband was involved in her death.

The story of her death inspired the opera Midnight Son by Gordon Kerry and Louis Nowra, first performed by Victorian Opera in Melbourne in 2012. In April 2018, the story was also covered by Casefile True Crime Podcast.

== See also ==
- List of solved missing person cases (2000s)
- Uxoricide
