= Bernadette Harvey =

Australian concert pianist

Bernadette Harvey DMA (Eastman USA) ASCM (Associate Sydney Conservatorium of Music) (aka Bernadette Harvey Balkus) is an Australian concert pianist and Senior Lecturer at the Sydney Conservatorium of Music.

A prodigy at the age of 2½ when she won her first medal in a Sydney Eisteddfod, she has given concerts all over the world and collaborated with leading Australian and international conductors and orchestras, chamber ensembles and distinguished colleagues such as Stuart Challender, Patrick Thomas, Marc-Andre Hamelin, Pierre Jalbert, Ani Kavafian, David Shifrin as well as the Prazak, Tokyo and Shanghai Quartets and in 2019 the Canadian Jupiter Quartet. Although she is acclaimed for her performances of the traditional canon of music, her preference is for original contemporary piano music.

She has pioneered and premiered the works of many Australian and American composers in Australia and overseas, including Matthew Hindson, Nigel Westlake, Ross Edwards, Tim Dargaville, Pierre Jalbert, Kevin Puts, Gordon Kerry, Carl Vine, Jane Stanley, Melody Eötvös and Donald Hollier.

As Artistic Director of the 3rd Australian Women's Festival in 1997 she showcased the compositions of eighty (80) emerging Australian female composers, including many working abroad.

== Personal ==
She is the sister of fellow pianist Michael Kieran Harvey.

== Awards ==
=== Mo Awards ===
The Australian Entertainment Mo Awards (commonly known informally as the Mo Awards), were annual Australian entertainment industry awards. They recognise achievements in live entertainment in Australia from 1975 to 2016.

Year	Nominee / work	Award	Result (wins only)
1998	Bernadette Balkus and Michael Kieran Harvey	Classical Performance of the Year	Won
