= Carolyn Watson =

Australian conductor

Carolyn Narelle Watson is an Australian conductor.

== Education ==
Carolyn Watson attended Figtree High School and studied at the Wollongong Conservatorium of Music before pursuing an undergraduate degree at the Sydney Conservatorium of Music. From there, she furthered her studies at the Kodály Institute in Kecskemét, Hungary, from which she graduated with an Advanced Diploma.

Subsequently, she pursued graduate conducting studies with David Zinman at the American Academy of Conducting in Aspen and at the Sydney Conservatorium of Music under Imre Palló. She has also participated in master classes with Marin Alsop, Peter Eötvös, Yoel Levi, Martyn Brabbins and Alex Polishchuk.

== Career ==
Carolyn Watson was a prizewinner at the 2012 Emmerich Kálmán International Operetta Conducting Competition in Budapest, Hungary where she placed Third and received the Herend Porcelain Manufacturer's Special Prize and the Special Prize of the Kodály Philharmonia.

In 2013, Watson won the Brian Stacey Award for Emerging Australian conductors as part of the 13th Helpmann Awards and was awarded a Dome Centenary Fellowship from the State Library of Victoria. She was the recipient of a Churchill Fellowship (2012), the Sir Charles Mackerras Conducting Prize from the Australian Music Foundation in London (2008) and the Nelly Apt Conducting Scholarship (2008). Watson was also the recipient of Opera Foundation Australia's New Berlin Music Opera Award in 2012 and the Bayreuth Opera Award in 2009. Also in 2013, Watson moved to the United States when she was appointed Music Director of the Interlochen Arts Academy Orchestra at Interlochen Center for the Arts with whom she was awarded the 2015 American Prize in Orchestral Performance.

Watson is currently Music Director of the La Porte County Symphony in Indiana and Principal Guest Conductor of the Kansas City Chamber Orchestra. Since moving to the US she has conducted the Amarillo Opera, Austin Symphony, Cape Symphony, Catskill Symphony, Columbus Indiana Philharmonic, Dallas Opera, Des Moines Metro Opera, Detroit Symphony Civic Orchestra, Fort Worth Symphony Orchestra, Kansas City Ballet, Lyric Opera of Kansas City, Opera in the Heights, South Bend Symphony, St. Joseph Symphony, Traverse Symphony Orchestra, Tulsa Opera, and the World Youth Symphony Orchestra.

Notable European credits include Infektion!, a festival of modern theatre celebrating the works of John Cage at the Staatsoper Berlin, conducting musicians of the Berlin Philharmonic in Interaktion, a residency at the Israeli National Opera, and assisting Sir Charles Mackerras on his final two productions at The Royal Opera, Covent Garden and Glyndebourne. Additional international conducting credits include the Brandenburger Symphoniker, BBC Concert Orchestra, Budapest Operetta Theatre, Bulgarian State Opera Bourgas, Duna Szimfonikus Budapest, North Czech Philharmonic Orchestra, Kammerphilharmonie Graz, Kodály Philharmonia Debrecen, Mihail Jora Philharmonic Romania, Savaria Symphony Orchestra, Scottish Chamber Orchestra, and in Russia, the St. Petersburg Chamber Philharmonic. In Australia she has worked with the Conservatorium High School, Darwin Symphony, Monash Academy Orchestra, Melbourne Youth Orchestra, SBS Youth Orchestra, Sydney Conservatorium of Music, Sydney Philharmonia Choirs, Sydney Symphony, Sydney Youth Orchestra, Tasmanian Conservatorium of Music, Tasmania Discovery Orchestra and Willoughby Symphony Orchestra.

Watson was recognized in 2021 by the Australian government as a leading global Australian and finalist in the Arts Category of the Advance Awards.

Watson holds a PhD in Conducting from the University of Sydney, where her doctoral dissertation was titled Gesture as Communication: The Art of Carlos Kleiber.
