= Midnight Son (opera) =

Midnight Son is an opera in one act by composer Gordon Kerry and librettist Louis Nowra. The contemporary opera is inspired by the true story of the murder of Melbourne woman Maria Korp.

Midnight Son was premiered by Victorian Opera in May 2012 at the Merlyn Theatre, CUB Malthouse, in Melbourne. The 90-minute work was conducted by Ollivier-Philippe Cuneo and featured Byron Watson, Antoinette Halloran, Dimity Shepherd, Roxane Hislop and Jonathan Bode.

It was nominated for Best New Australian Work and Best Original Score at the 2013 Helpmann Awards.
