= Gordon Kerry =

Australian composer, music administrator and music critic

Gordon Kerry (born 1961) is an Australian composer, music administrator, music writer and music critic.

== Career ==
Kerry studied composition at the University of Melbourne under Barry Conyngham. He then worked for the Sydney Festival and resided in Sydney for the next 16 years. After the retirement of Fred Blanks, Kerry was invited to become a music critic for the Sydney Morning Herald. In April 1997 he was appointed artistic administrator for Musica Viva Australia, a post he held for 18 months but left as he had too little time to compose. He then became the organisation's musical adviser. He also contributes pieces for Limelight and The Australian's Review of Books.

Bright Meniscus was inspired by J. R. Rowland's poem "Canberra in April" and was premiered by the Canberra Symphony Orchestra in May 1997.

In 2009, he was awarded the Ian Potter Established Composer Fellowship. His book New Classical Music: Composing Australia was published by UNSW Press in 2009.

His Clarinet Concerto was commissioned by Symphony Australia and was premiered on 21 August 2002, with soloist Francesco Celata and the Sydney Symphony Orchestra under Sir Mark Elder. It includes a short quotation from Kerry's "Fioritura", a short solo piece written for Celata.

In 2012 he was Musica Viva Australia's Composer-in-Residence.

On 16 May 2012, Kerry's opera Midnight Son was premiered at the Malthouse Theatre, Melbourne, by Victorian Opera. Its libretto was by Louis Nowra, and it was directed by Nicki Wendt. The opera was based on the 2005 murder of Maria Korp by her husband Joe Korp's lover Tania Herman, and Joe Korp's subsequent suicide (it was originally to be called Korp). Principal soloists were Antoinette Halloran and Byron Watson. Although all the names were changed, members of the Korp family and victims of crime organisations criticised the production for lack of sensitivity.

His Violin Concerto "So Dreams Thy Sails" was commissioned by Andrew and Fiona Johnston, and scored for solo violin, harp, horns and strings. It was written as a homage to Kerry's father's 90th birthday, and was premiered on 30 October 2016, with soloist Helena Rathbone and the Australian Chamber Orchestra.

His opera The Snow Queen (libretto by John Kinsella, based on the fairy tale by Hans Christian Andersen) was commissioned by Victorian Opera, and was premiered in Wodonga on 3 November 2017, conducted by Richard Mills.

Since 2002 he has lived with his partner in Sandy Creek, overlooking Lake Hume in northern Victoria, not far from Wodonga.

In May 2021, his Sinfonia Concertante for flute, clarinet and orchestra, was premiered by Alison Mitchell, Irit Silver and the Queensland Symphony Orchestra under Benjamin Northey.

== Selected other works ==
- Sinfonietta (1992, for the Perth International Arts Festival)
- Opera Medea (1993; libretto by Justin Macdonnell); it has been staged in Sydney, Melbourne, Canberra, Washington, Berlin, Düsseldorf
- Variations for Orchestra (1998; Melbourne Symphony Orchestra, Markus Stenz
- Cello Concerto (1997–98; Truls Mørk, Tasmanian Symphony Orchestra, Michael Halász)
- Piano Sonata for Ian Munro (1997–98)
- Harmonie, wind quintet (1997–98, Canberra Wind Soloists)
- Seven Improvisations for Cello and Percussion, April 1999, Sue-Ellen Paulsen and Tom O'Kelly, Tasmanian Conservatorium of Music
- Viola Concerto, SSO, 28 April 1999
- Such Sweet Thunder, 30 September 1999, Sydney Symphony Orchestra, Markus Stenz
- Piano duo, for Michael Kieran Harvey and Bernadette Harvey Balkus, 2000
- Breathtaking, mezzo-soprano, piano, 4 winds, 9 May 1999, Southern Cross Soloists
- Blue Latitudes, 29 January 2000, Wigmore Hall, London, Nash Ensemble
- Cantata Through the Fire, commemorating the 2002/3 northern Victorian bushfires, Opera in the Alps Festival, Beechworth, 24 January 2004
- In iubilo, Concert Overture (2010) - Commissioned for the Bendigo Symphony Orchestra
- Opera Snow White and Other Grimm Tales (2015; libretto by John Kinsella)
- Clarinet Quintet (2019, for clarinetist David Rowden and Omega Ensemble)
- Splendera
- Completion of Wolfgang Amadeus Mozart's Requiem, commissioned by the Australian Broadcasting Corporation.

== Awards and nominations ==
=== APRA Music Awards ===
The APRA Awards are presented annually from 1982 by the Australasian Performing Right Association (APRA). They include the Art Music Awards, which are distributed by APRA AMCOS and the Australian Music Centre (AMC).

Year	Nominee / work	Award	Result	Ref.
2018	"String Quintet No. 2" (Gordon Kerry) for Australian String Quartet and Pieter Wispelwey	Work of the Year – Instrumental	Nominated	
2021	Clarinet Quartet (Kerry) for Omega Ensemble	Work of the Year: Chamber Music	Nominated	

== External sources ==
- Official website
- Australian Music Centre
- "Inside the Musician. Gordon Kerry: The undiscovered continent" by Australian Music Trust
