= Helpmann Award for Best Male Actor in a Supporting Role in a Play =

Annual Australian theatre award

The Helpmann Award for Best Male Actor in a Supporting Role in a Play is a theatre award, presented by Live Performance Australia (LPA) at the annual Helpmann Awards since 2003. In the following list, winners are listed first and marked in gold, in boldface, and the nominees are listed below with no highlight.

== Winners and nominees ==
Winners are listed first and marked in a separate colour, in boldface.

Year	Actor	Production	Character(s)
**2003** (3rd)
**2003** (3rd)	**Peter Carroll**	**Endgame**	**Nag**
**2003** (3rd)	Paul English	Rapture	Dan
**2003** (3rd)	Christopher Gabardi	Cloud Nine	Clive
**2003** (3rd)	Jean-Marc Russ	The Messiah	Leslie Barrymore Locket
**2004** (4th)
**2004** (4th)	**David Field**	**Victory**	**Ball**
**2004** (4th)	Steve Bisley	Inheritance	Lyle
**2004** (4th)	Tom Budge	The Lieutenant of Inishmore	Davy
**2004** (4th)	Wayne Blair	Inheritance	Nugget
**2005** (5th)
**2005** (5th)	**Anthony Weigh**	**Hedda Gabler**	**Jørgen Tesman**
**2005** (5th)	Hugo Weaving	Hedda Gabler	Judge Brack
**2005** (5th)	John Gaden	Democracy	Herbert Wehner
**2005** (5th)	Robert Menzies	The Ham Funeral	Defoe
**2006** (6th)
**2006** (6th)	**Russell Dykstra**	**Stuff Happens**	**Donald Rumsfeld**
**2006** (6th)	Cameron Goodall	The Goat, or Who Is Sylvia?	Billy
**2006** (6th)	Frank Whitten	Julius Caesar	Gaius Cassius Longinus
**2006** (6th)	Hamish Michael	Two Brothers	Harry
**2007** (7th)
**2007** (7th)	**Paul Capsis**	**The Lost Echo**	**Diana**
**2007** (7th)	Dan Wyllie	The Pillowman	Ariel
**2007** (7th)	Matthew Newton	The History Boys	Tom Irwin
**2007** (7th)	Sean Taylor	Uncle Vanya	Mikhail Lvovich Astrov
**2008** (8th)
**2008** (8th)	**Russell Dykstra**	**Toy Symphony**	**Steve Gooding**, **Dr. Maybloom** and **Headmaster**
**2008** (8th)	James Stewart	The Glass Menagerie	Jim O'Connor
**2008** (8th)	David Woods	Exit the King	Guard
**2008** (8th)	Travis McMahon	Don's Party	Mack
**2009** (9th)
**2009** (9th)	**Ewen Leslie**	**War of the Roses**	**Prince Hal**
**2009** (9th)	Grant Piro	Realism	Dinsky
**2009** (9th)	Jimi Bani	Yibiyung	Smiley
**2009** (9th)	Mark Jones	Goodbye Vaudeville Charlie Mudd	Bones
**2010** (10th)
**2010** (10th)	**Humphrey Bower**	**Richard III**	**Duke of Buckingham**
**2010** (10th)	Dennis Olsen	King Lear	Earl of Gloucester
**2010** (10th)	Charlie Garber	Gethsemane	Frank
**2010** (10th)	Arky Michael	Love Me Tender	Chorus
**2011** (11th)
**2011** (11th)	**Anthony Phelan**	**The Wild Duck**	**Old Ekdal**
**2011** (11th)	Colin Moody	Measure for Measure	Barnardine
**2011** (11th)	John Bell	Uncle Vanya	Professor Serebryakov
**2011** (11th)	Dennis Olsen	Entertaining Mr Sloane	Kemp
**2012** (12th)
**2012** (12th)	**Bob Hornery**	**The Importance of Being Earnest**	**Lane**
**2012** (12th)	Patrick Brammall	Clybourne Park	Karl
**2012** (12th)	Alex Menglet	Julius Caesar	Julius Caesar
**2012** (12th)	Trevor Stuart	As You Like It	Jaques
**2013** (13th)
**2013** (13th)	**Colin Moody**	**The Secret River**	**Thomas Blackwood**
**2013** (13th)	Patrick Brammall	Death of a Salesman	Biff Loman
**2013** (13th)	Rory Potter	Medea	Jasper
**2013** (13th)	Hayden Spencer	End of the Rainbow	Anthony
**2014** (14th)
**2014** (14th)	**Luke Mullins**	**Waiting for Godot**	
**2014** (14th)	Jimi Bani	The Shadow King	
**2014** (14th)	Tom Budge	The Beast	
**2014** (14th)	Ewen Leslie	Rosencrantz and Guildenstern Are Dead	
**2015** (15th)
**2015** (15th)	**John Bell**	**As You Like It**	
**2015** (15th)	Glenn Hazeldine	After Dinner	
**2015** (15th)	Bruce Spence	Endgame	
**2015** (15th)	Lasarus Ratuere	Kill the Messenger	
**2016** (16th)
**2016** (16th)	**Mark Leonard Winter**	**King Lear**	
**2016** (16th)	Colin Friels	Mortido	
**2016** (16th)	John Howard	Ivanov	
**2016** (16th)	Thuso Lekwape	Prize Fighter	
**2017** (17th)
**2017** (17th)	**Guy Simon**	**Jasper Jones**	
**2017** (17th)	Jamie Oxenbould	The Literati	Clinton
**2017** (17th)	Pip Miller	Faith Healer	Teddy
**2017** (17th)	Peter Carroll	Twelfth Night	Malvolio
**2018** (18th)
**2018** (18th)	**Mitchell Butel**	**Mr Burns, A Post-Electric Play**	**Mr Burns**
**2018** (18th)	Harry Greenwood	Cloud Nine	Betty and Edward
**2018** (18th)	Colin Moody	The Resistible Rise of Arturo Ui	Roma
**2018** (18th)	Peter Carroll	The Resistible Rise of Arturo Ui	Dogsborough
**2019** (19th)
**2019** (19th)	**Paul Blackwell**	**Faith Healer**	Teddy
**2019** (19th)	Ash Flanders	Blackie Blackie Brown: The Traditional Owner of Death	(all the white characters)
**2019** (19th)	Antonythasan Jesuthasan	Counting and Cracking	Thirru (older)
**2019** (19th)	William McKenna	Harry Potter and the Cursed Child (Parts One and Two)	Scorpius Malfoy

== See also ==
- Helpmann Awards
