= Helpmann Award for Best Female Actor in a Supporting Role in a Play =

Annual Australian theatre award

The Helpmann Award for Best Female Actor in a Supporting Role in a Play is a theatre award, presented by Live Performance Australia (LPA) at the annual Helpmann Awards since 2003. In the following list, winners are listed first and marked in gold, in boldface, and the nominees are listed below with no highlight.

== Winners and nominees ==
Winners are listed first and marked in a separate colour, in boldface.

| Year | Actor | Production | Character(s) |
|---|---|---|---|
**2003** (3rd)
| **2003** (3rd) | **Jane Harders** | **Copenhagen** | **Margrethe Bohr** |
| **2003** (3rd) | Deborah Kennedy | Soulmates | Fiona |
| **2003** (3rd) | Angela Punch McGregor | Great Expectations | Miss Havisham |
| **2003** (3rd) | Julie Forsyth | Great Expectations | Mrs Joe Gargery and Miss Skiffins |
**2004** (4th)
| **2004** (4th) | **Belinda McClory** | **Frozen** | **Agnetha** |
| **2004** (4th) | Deidre Rubenstein | Night Letters | Innkeeper |
| **2004** (4th) | Rebecca Massey | The Underpants | Gertrude |
| **2004** (4th) | Amber McMahon | The Snow Queen | Little Robber Girl |
**2005** (5th)
| **2005** (5th) | **Zoe Carides** | **Influence** | **Zehra** |
| **2005** (5th) | Amber McMahon | Afternoon of the Elves | Maid |
| **2005** (5th) | Kerry Walker | The Spook | Trixie |
| **2005** (5th) | Justine Clarke | Hedda Gabler | Thea Elvsted |
**2006** (6th)
| **2006** (6th) | **Alison Bell** | **Doubt** | **Sister Aloysius** |
| **2006** (6th) | Michaela Cantwell | Honk if you are Jesus | Mary-Beth |
| **2006** (6th) | Belinda McClory | The Odyssey | Circe |
| **2006** (6th) | Anne Looby | The Peach Season | Celia |
**2007** (7th)
| **2007** (7th) | **Deborah Mailman** | **The Lost Echo** | **Satirino** |
| **2007** (7th) | Bojana Novakovic | Eldorado | Manuela |
| **2007** (7th) | Hayley McElhinney | Mother Courage and Her Children | Kattrin |
| **2007** (7th) | Rebecca Massey | It Just Stopped | Pearl |
**2008** (8th)
| **2008** (8th) | **Julie Forsyth** | **Exit the King** | **Juliette** |
| **2008** (8th) | Monica Maughan | Toy Symphony | Mrs. Walkham |
| **2008** (8th) | Alison Whyte | Don's Party | Jenny |
| **2008** (8th) | Susan Prior | Riflemind | Lynn |
**2009** (9th)
| **2009** (9th) | **Marta Dusseldorp** | **War of the Roses** | **Queen Margaret** |
| **2009** (9th) | Christen O'Leary | Goodbye Vaudeville Charlie Mudd | Maude Adle |
| **2009** (9th) | Bojana Novakovic | Woyzeck | Marie |
| **2009** (9th) | Yael Stone | Scorched | Janine |
**2010** (10th)
| **2010** (10th) | **Alison Whyte** | **Richard III** | **Queen Elizabeth** |
| **2010** (10th) | Jennifer Hagan | Richard III | Queen Margaret |
| **2010** (10th) | Deborah Kennedy | The Book of Everything | Aunty Pie |
| **2010** (10th) | Yael Stone | The Book of Everything | Eliza |
**2011** (11th)
| **2011** (11th) | **Anita Hegh** | **The Wild Duck** | **Gina** |
| **2011** (11th) | Anne Phelan | Do Not Go Gentle | Wilson |
| **2011** (11th) | Helen Thomson | In the Next Room (or The Vibrator Play) | Sabrina Daldry |
| **2011** (11th) | Yael Stone | Entertaining Mr Sloane | Sophie, Madgie and Fidele |
**2012** (12th)
| **2012** (12th) | **Robyn Nevin** | **Summer of the Seventeenth Doll** | **Emma Leech** |
| **2012** (12th) | Justine Clarke | Les Liaisons Dangereuses | Madame de Tourvel |
| **2012** (12th) | Kris McQuade | Neighbourhood Watch | Milova |
| **2012** (12th) | Miranda Otto | The White Guard | Lena |
**2013** (13th)
| **2013** (13th) | **Amber McMahon** | **School Dance** | **Hannah Ellis** |
| **2013** (13th) | Lynette Curran | Cat on a Hot Tin Roof | Big Mama |
| **2013** (13th) | Valerie Bader | Australia Day | Marie |
| **2013** (13th) | Miranda Tapsell | The Secret River | Muruli |
**2014** (14th)
| **2014** (14th) | **Robyn Nevin** | **Angels in America** | |
| **2014** (14th) | Elizabeth Debicki | The Maids | |
| **2014** (14th) | Susan Prior | Small and Tired | |
| **2014** (14th) | Zahra Newman | The Government Inspector | |
**2015** (15th)
| **2015** (15th) | **Helen Thomson** | **After Dinner** | |
| **2015** (15th) | Julie Forsyth | Endgame | |
| **2015** (15th) | Sarah Peirse | Endgame | |
| **2015** (15th) | Pamela Rabe | Beckett Triptych Footfalls | |
**2016** (16th)
| **2016** (16th) | **Sarah Peirse** | **The Golden Age** | |
| **2016** (16th) | Michelle Doake | Romeo and Juliet | |
| **2016** (16th) | Katrina Milosevic | The Distance | |
| **2016** (16th) | Anna Samson | Birdland | |
**2017** (17th)
| **2017** (17th) | **Amber McMahon** | **Girl Asleep** | |
| **2017** (17th) | Chloe Bayliss | Gloria | |
| **2017** (17th) | Tilda Cobham-Hervey | Things I Know To Be True | |
| **2017** (17th) | Melita Jurisic | John | |
**2018** (18th)
| **2018** (18th) | **Anita Hegh** | **The Resistible Rise of Arturo Ui** | |
| **2018** (18th) | Jane Montgomery-Griffiths | Macbeth | |
| **2018** (18th) | Kate Box | Top Girls | |
| **2018** (18th) | Elaine Crombie | An Octoroon | |
**2019** (19th)
| **2019** (19th) | **Vaishnavi Suryaprakash** | **Counting and Cracking** | **Rahda (younger)** |
| **2019** (19th) | Helen Thomson | The Harp in the South: Part One and Part Two | Delie Stock |
| **2019** (19th) | Maude Davey | Melancholia | |
| **2019** (19th) | Zoe Terakes | A View from the Bridge | |

== See also ==
- Helpmann Awards
