= Michael Kieran Harvey =

Australian pianist and composer (born 1961)

Michael Kieran Harvey (born 7 July 1961) is an Australian pianist and composer whose career has been notable for its diversity and wide repertoire. He is renowned for commissioning, performing and composing new music. He has especially promoted the works of Australian composers and is also particularly associated with the piano music of Olivier Messiaen.

According to critic Clive O'Connell in The Age: "Few Australian pianists can touch Michael Kieran Harvey, one of the most exciting exponents of contemporary music in the country". After Harvey's US debut at Pasadena's Ambassador Centre in 1994 critic Alan Rich wrote: "In intermission conversation at Michael Kieran Harvey's U.S. debut recital the name of Glenn Gould was often heard, and with reason. Not since the heyday of the late flamboyant Canadian had a pianist come forward with such extraordinary technique combined with so vibrant a gift for stirring up controversy. Like him or not -- both factions were represented -- it had to be one of the most stimulating debut recitals within anyone's memory…This was one hell of an interesting concert".

== Biography ==
=== Family ===
Michael Kieran Harvey was born in Sydney in 1961. He says that as a child he had great difficulty in coming to terms with being a musician, as he played four different codes of football and was also involved in surf lifesaving. His brother, Dominic, was head of brass at the Australian National University and is a noted conductor; his sister Bernadette, is a pianist. and another sister, Rowan Harvey-Martin, is a violinist and noted conductor. His mother, Anne (a student of Alexander Sverjensky), abandoned her plans to become a concert pianist when her own father died in her mid-teens. His father, Francis, was a journalist and for a time a freelance cellist. He is married to pianist Dr Arabella Teniswood-Harvey.

=== Background ===
Harvey studied piano at the Canberra School of Music with Alan Jenkins, at the Sydney Conservatorium of Music under Gordon Watson, and at the Franz Liszt Academy of Music, Budapest, under Sándor Falvai. He first came to international prominence by jointly winning, with Edith Chen, the 1993 International Solo Piano Competition founded by Ivo Pogorelić in Pasadena, California, in which he introduced Carl Vine's Piano Sonata No. 1 to North America.

At the time, this was the world's richest piano competition. He entered the competition not believing he could win, but as an excuse to go to Los Angeles to see Frank Zappa, who was very ill, and to seek permission to play his piano music in public. However, Zappa died of cancer on the day of the finals and Harvey did not meet him.

=== Career ===
He has premiered many new Australian concertos by composers such as Carl Vine, Nigel Westlake, Paul Grabowsky, Larry Sitsky, David Joseph, Barry Conyngham, Don Kay, Yitzhak Yedid and Eve Duncan.

He has given Australian premieres of important international works by Louis Andriessen, Stefan Wolpe, Donald Martino, Frank Zappa, Jon Lord (of Deep Purple), Keith Emerson (of Emerson, Lake & Palmer), Beat Furrer and Milton Babbitt.

Harvey has worked with conductors such as Edo de Waart, Reinbert de Leeuw, Diego Masson, Markus Stenz and Kristjan Järvi, and has collaborated with the Arditti Quartet, the Netherlands and Luxembourg Philharmonics, Jon Lord, Keith Emerson, and Paul Grabowsky. He regularly appears as soloist with Australian symphony orchestras.

He has performed and recorded most of Olivier Messiaen's works involving piano to high critical acclaim. In 2005 he released a live 3-CD recording of the Australian premiere of the entire Catalogue d'oiseaux featuring Peter Cundall as narrator. Despite his close association with Messiaen's music Harvey is an atheist, who describes himself as having escaped Catholicism in his early teens, as did Frank Zappa.

He has made premiere recordings of Carl Vine's piano music (including the 12 Preludes of 2006), much of which was written for him. He commissioned Nigel Westlake's Piano Sonatas I (1998) and II (2004) and Piano Concerto (2000) and gave the premiere performances. Harvey has commissioned and recorded major Australian piano cycles by Larry Sitsky, Mike Nock, and Graham Hair, and promoted major works by Helen Gifford, Warren Burt, Eve Duncan, Tom Henry, and Brett Dean.

== Compositions ==
Harvey holds a PhD in composition and has recorded much of his own music.

Title	Instrumentation	Year
Elektra	piano with live electronics	1992
Toccata DNA	piano	1993
Toccata DNA	trio for percussion, flute and piano	1993
Addict	piano with live electronics	1994
Spindrift	piano with live electronics	1995
Kazohinia	French horn, singer, piano, synthesiser, CD and live electronics	1997–98
Play the piano drunk until the fingers begin to bleed a bit	electric piano and CD	2002
Miles away	electric piano and CD	2002
...until the fingers begin to bleed...	amplified sextet (2 pianos, clarinet, viola, 2 electric guitars)	2002
Blood on the spinifex	suite of 12 movements for electric piano and CD	2003
Pink Nautilus	piano	2003
Piano Sonata No. 1	piano	2006
Kursk	cello and piano	2007
48 Fugues for Frank	cycle for piano/keyboards	2009
Makzurka	piano	2011
Etude for trumpet in C and piano	trumpet and piano	2011
Homage to Liszt	percussion and piano	2011
Fear	violin and piano	2011
Psychosonata (Piano Sonata No. 2)	piano	2012
City of Snakes	bass clarinet, drums, electric piano, bass	2013
Deus est fabula	clarinet, piano, violin	2014
N-Chromium	keyboards and rock ensemble	2014
Deaths Head Mandala	synthesiser, electric guitar and rock ensemble	2014
The Ride of the Little Star	piano	2014
Patañjali	suite of five movements for two keyboards and percussion	2015
Carpe Diem	piano	2015
"7"	baritone saxophone and piano	2015
"7"	alto saxophone and keyboards	2016
Portrait of Bob Brown	violin and piano	2016
Piano Sonata No. 3 "Aporia"	piano	2016
Homage to Liszt	violin and piano	2016
Homage to Liszt	solo piano	2017
The Green Brain	cycle of 20 movements for piano/keyboards	2017–18
Tubby the president	tuba and piano	2018
Module Fugue	piano	2018
Keen	piano	2018
Piano Sonata No. 4 "A. Gramsci"	piano	2018
Catalogue des Errances Bibliques (duo), Symphony in no need of an orchestra	cycle of 25 movements for duo keyboards	2018
Astro Labe, Coeur de Lion	duo for trumpet and electric piano/synth/sequencer	2018
PRTZL	solo for two opposing keyboards	2018
Catalogue des Errances Bibliques (ensemble), Symphony in no need of an orchestra	cycle of 25 movements for narrator and ensemble	2019
Aporia II	three pianos and percussion	2019
Divertimento	solo piano	2019
Gestalt Climate	for two pianos	2019
Duo for viola and piano	viola and piano	2019
Rameaustein	for iPads, iPhone and electric keyboard	2019
Inside the World of the Digital Narcissist	for soprano and percussion	2019
Piano Sonata #5: "GRETA", Concerto in no need of an orchestra	solo piano/electric keyboard	2020
Piano Sonata #6: '17 Graeme Lee Prints'	solo piano	2020
Lawyers Are Lovely Misunderstood People And We Should All Be Much Kinder To Them	solo piano	2021
Four Ballades	solo piano	2021
Death Cap Mushroom	Piano, toy piano, extended rock kit, lead guitar, vocals	2021
Piano Sonata #7: "The Sparrow and the Mead Hall"	solo piano	2021
Piano Sonata #8: "P. Singer" (War Sonata #1)	solo piano	2023
Piano Sonata #9: "Sonata da Caemmerer" (War Sonata #2)	solo piano	2023
Piano Sonata #10: "Riding With Death" (War Sonata #3)	solo piano	2023

== Recordings ==
Title	Contents	Label/year
1 "Michael Kieran Harvey plays Liszt, Ravel, Rachmaninoff, Scriabin"	Liszt B minor sonata, Ravel Gaspard de la Nuit, Rachmaninoff Etudes Tableaux 1–3, Scriabin Vers la Flamme	CDPP1, 1991
2 "Inspired 20th Century Piano Music"	Vine Sonata #1; Carter Sonata; Stravinsky Petrouchka; Graham Hair "Under Aldebaran"	CDPP2, 1992
3 "Vine Piano Sonata #1"	Vine Sonata #1	Tall Poppies TP 013, 1992
4 "Piano Miniatures"	works by 42 Australian composers	Red House Editions, 1994
5 "Anthology of Australian Music on Disc"	McSullea/Harvey, Music for flute, piano and computer-generated sound, Humble, Pollard, Walker, Yu, Banks, Worral and Burt	Canberra School of Music CD-CSM 18,1994
6 "Threnody"	Harvey "Toccata DNA" and "Addict"; Vine 5 Bagatelles; Campbell "quaquaversal"; McCaughey 8 Preludes; Byrne "Within Stanzas"; Humble 8 Bagatelles; Anderson "Reveria"	Astra CD1, 1995
7 "Expose"	Tahourdin	Move MD 3205, 1998
8 "Vers La Flamme"	Scriabin	Deutsche Grammophon 441 969–2, 1998
9 "Vingt Regards sur L'enfant Jesus"	Messiaen	ABC Classics double CD, ABC 462 767–2, 1999
10 "A Handful of Rain "	Pollard	Move MD 3218, 1999
11 "Piano Concerto #1"	Carl Vine	ABC Classics ABC 456 698–2, 2000
12 "Vine Piano Sonata #2"	Carl Vine	Tall Poppies TP 120, 2000
13 "Carnival of the Animals"	Saint-Saëns, ACO/Leunig/Garrett, Australian Virtuosi (Michael Kieran Harvey, Bernadette Harvey)	Regency Recordings 34275 FT2437, 2000
14 "Storm Sight"	Vine sonatas 1 & 2; Zappa "Ruth is Sleeping"; Macek "Small Leaps"; Dargaville "Alba"	ABC 461 723–2, 2001
15 "Recital – Australian Art Song"	Merlyn Quaife accompanied by Michael Kieran Harvey	Tall Poppies TP 155, 2002
16 "Rabid Bay"	Westlake sonata #1, Whiffen sonata #2, Dargaville "Negra", Tempany "The promise of Water", Harvey "Pink Nautilus", Vine "Rash", Neal "Rabid Bay"	Move MD3288 2004
17 "Tensile Flame"	Liszt sonata plus 20th Century piano music	Move double CD MD3286 2004
18 "Catalogue d'oiseaux"	Messiaen with narration by Peter Cundall	Move triple CD MD3299 2005
19 "As all the Heavens were a Bell"	"The Waves" by Martin Mackerras	Martin Mackerras 2005
20 "The Music of David Joseph vol.2"	Piano Concerto, Rhapsody for piano	Move MD3302 2006
21 "American Violin and Piano music"	Miwako Abe accompanied by Michael Kieran Harvey	New World Records 80641-2 2006
22 "Shostakovitch/Messiaen"	Shostakovitch preludes op 34 and piano sonata #1, Messiaen 8 preludes	Move MD3308 2006
23 "The Hinchinbrook Riffs"	Westlake sonata #1	Tall Poppies 187 2006
24 "The Way of The Seeker"	piano cycle by Larry Sitsky	Move MD3309 2006
25 "The Piano Music of Carl Vine 1990–2006"	Vine sonatas 1&2, bagatelles, Preludes, Red Blues	Tall Poppies 190 2006
26 "In the Time of Sakura"	The Piano Music of Mike Nock	Move MD3314 2007
27 "Crystal Vision"	The Piano Music of Kanako Okamoto	Move MD3319 2007
28 "Broadway Boogie"	Westlake (sonata #2), Byrne (6 Dances 2002), McCaughey (Toccata), Pollard (sonata 2006), Harvey (Sonata #1) and Ford (Broadway Boogie-Woogie)	Move MD3315 2007
29 "Curiosities"	Eve Duncan: Wave to the Depths I & II	Move MD3320 2007
30 "The School of Natural Philosophy"	Friedel " The School of Natural Philosophy", Knehans "Boyd Panels", Hair 3 Transcendental etudes, Paredes "Triptico", Meale/Harvey "Coruscations II" (for electric piano)	Move MD 3324 2008
31 "Dimensions of Night"	Piano Cycle of 10 movements by Larry Sitsky	Move MD 3325 2009
32 "Elektra"	Harvey – Elektra, Gould – 3 pieces for Piano, Gifford – Menin Gate, Ford – Folly, Yu – Sonata	Move MD 3329 2009
33 "48 Fugues For Frank"	Piano Cycle – Homage to Zappa – by M.K.Harvey, with concrete poetry by Dr Arjun von Caemmerer	Move MD 3339 2010
34 "Astra 60"	Humble – Sonata no. 1, Gifford – Three Pieces, Pollard – Krebs, Boland – Two Miniatures, Henry – Piano Sonata, Whiffen – Sonata no. 3	Move MD 3357 2012
35 "Psychosonata"	original works by Michael Kieran Harvey 2007–13: "Psychosonata" (Piano sonata #2), "Kursk" (cello and piano), "Fear" (violin and piano), "Makzurka" (piano), "Homage to Liszt" (percussion and piano), "Etude" (trumpet and piano), "City of Snakes" (bass clarinet, piano, bass and drums)	Move MD 3368 2013
36 "Inferno"	cycle of 15 movements for Michael Kieran Harvey by Elliott Gyger (2013); with Compass variations (1994) (live recording)	Move MD 3376 2014
37 "Siva"	Australian virtuoso piano music: Hanson – Sonata op. 12, Kerry – Sonata, Colbert – "Quicksand", Gifford – "Siva", Kelly – Untitled (Moths)	Move MD 3397 2015
38 "Patañjali"	a celebration of Patañjali's Yoga-Sūtra in music and āsana: composed for 2 keyboards and percussion by Michael Kieran Harvey 2015	Move CD/DVD MD 3399 2015
39 "126 Variations on Twinkle Twinkle Little Star"	the Young Person's Guide to Composition (2014) by Julian Yu	Move MD 3404 2016
40 "70 More Variations on Twinkle Twinkle Little Star"	from composers around the world (2014) Julian Yu (ed.)	Move MD 3405, 2016
41 "The piano music of Michael Bertram"	Piano Sonata and other works	Move MD 3407, 2016
42 "Portrait of Bob Brown"	Portrait of Bob Brown for violin and piano (Harvey, 2016), Homage to Liszt for violin and piano (Harvey, 2016), Aftermath for solo violin (Emily Sheppard, 2016)	Move MD 3415, 2017
43 "Aporia"	Australian Piano Music: Harvey 3rd Piano Sonata "Aporia" (2016), works by David Harris, Allan Walker, Paul Grabowsky and Simon Barber	Move MD 3418, 2017
44 "Concerto for Piano and Toy Band"	Piano concerto with jazz/rock ensemble by Adam Simmons, performed by Michael Kieran Harvey and Adam Simmons' Toy Band	Fat Rain CD FAT016, 2017
45 "Carmina Burana"	Orff, version for 2 pianos and percussion, performed by Sara Macliver, Paul McMahon, Jonathan Summers, Synergy, Cantillation, Australian Virtuosi (Michael Kieran Harvey and Bernadette Balkus), Sydney Children's Choir, conducted by Antony Walker	ABC Classics, ABC4814927, 2017
46 "The Green Brain"	Cycle of 20 movements by M. K. Harvey (2018) after the novel The Green Brain by Frank Herbert, with concrete poetry by Dr Arjun von Caemmerer	Move MD 3434, 2018
47 "Luz Meridional"	24 piano études no. 411 by Andriàn Pertout (2009–2012)	Move MD 3435, 2018
48 "Move 50"	24 composers celebrate 50 years of Move records (M.K.Harvey appears as interpreter and composer (Keen))	Move MD 3450, 2018
49 "Music from 4 to 40 Parts"	Vaughan McAlley's music interpreted by M.K.Harvey and Ensemble Gombert	Move MD 3437, 2019
50 "Dancing to the Tremors of Time"	Harvey interprets piano music by Brendan Colbert, Scott McIntyre, Don Kay, Elliott Gyger, Elizabeth Drake, Martin Friedel and Brendan Collins	Move MD 3438, 2019
51 "PRTZL"	Chamber works composed by M.K.Harvey: Module Fugue, Sonata No.4 "A.Gramsci", PRTZL, Astro Labe Coeur de Lion, Divertimento, Tubby the President, Gestalt Climate, Deus est Fabula, Toccata DNA (trio), Aporia II	Move MD 3447, 2019
52 "GRETA"	Piano Sonata #5 "GRETA" – Concerto in no need of an orchestra, composed and performed by M.K.Harvey in two versions – (a) solo piano (b) electric keyboards, with poem "Regret" by Dr Arjun von Caemmerer	Move MD 3452, 2020
53 "Piano Sonata #6"	Piano Sonata #6: '17 Graeme Lee Prints' with aphorisms by Arjun von Caemmerer (2020), composed and performed by M.K.Harvey	Move MD 3453, 2020
54 "Catalogue des Errances Bibliques"	"Catalogue des Errances Bibliques" (2019) for eight keyboardists and four percussionists, together with spoken narration written and spoken by Arjun von Caemmerer. Performed by M.K.Harvey, Tim Young, Peter Neville and A.N.A.M. pianists and percussionists.	Move MD 3457, 2021
55 "Chamber Concerto for Piano and Strings" by David Joseph on "Works for String Orchestra" by David Joseph	"Chamber Concerto for Piano and Strings" (1991/2) by David Joseph performed by M.K.Harvey and the Melbourne Chamber Orchestra conducted by Spiros Rantos	Move MD 3460, 2022
56 "Shichiseki"	Works by Kanako Okamoto and Mark Pollard (violin and piano), Andrian Pertout (solo piano, piano with cello), Gabriella Vici (solo piano sonata), and songs by Bach, Wolf and Purcell, performed by Michael Kieran Harvey, Miwako Abe (violin), Alister Barker (cello) and Martin Niedermair (counter-tenor).	Move MD 3470, 2023
57 "The Sparrow and the Mead Hall"	Original works composed and performed by Michael Kieran Harvey: Four Ballades for Piano (2021), Piano Sonata #7 "The Sparrow and the Mead Hall" (2021), "Lawyers Are Lovely Misunderstood People and We Should All Be Much Kinder To Them" for piano (2021), plus "Death Cap Mushroom" (2021) performed by Theodore Pike (piano, toy piano), Alex Bull (drums), Ben Cannings (vocals and electric guitar) with text by Dr Arjun von Caemmerer.	Move MD3471, 2023

== Legacy ==
In 2005 the Michael Kieran Harvey Scholarship was established and funded by Susan Mary Remington in honour of his contribution to Australian music, and to encourage future directions in keyboard art music. Recipients: 2006 – Cameron Roberts; 2008 – Ashley Hribar; 2010 – Zubin Kanga; 2012 – Aura Go and Adam Cook; 2014 – Dr James Hullick; 2016 – Alex Raineri and Nicholas Young; 2018 – Rohan Drape; 2020 – Dr Anthony Pateras; 2022 - Ayesha Gough; 2024 - Dr Erik Griswold.

== Honours and awards ==
- Joint Grand Prix in the 1993 International Solo Piano Competition (usually referred to as the Ivo Pogorelić Piano Competition, after its founder) in Pasadena, with Edith Chen
- Debussy Medal (Guilde Français des Artistes Soloistes Concurs Paris 1985)
- Finalist, Inaugural International Franz Liszt Piano Competition, Utrecht, Netherlands (1986)
- Awarded the Australian Government's Centenary Medal for services to Australian music (2001)
- Three times nominated for the Helpmann Award

=== ARIA Music Awards ===
The ARIA Music Awards is an annual awards ceremony that recognises excellence, innovation, and achievement across all genres of Australian music.

Year	Nominee / work	Award	Result
2000	Messiaen: Twenty Contemplations of the Infant Jesus	Best Classical Album	Nominated
2005	Rabid Bay	Best Classical Album	Nominated
2007	Carl Vine Piano Music 1990-2006	Best Classical Album	Nominated

=== Mo Awards ===
The Australian Entertainment Mo Awards (commonly known informally as the Mo Awards), were annual Australian entertainment industry awards. They recognise achievements in live entertainment in Australia from 1975 to 2016. Kieran Harvey won four awards in that time.

Year	Nominee / work	Award	Result (wins only)
1996	Michael Kieran Harvey	Classical Performer of the Year	Won
1997	Michael Kieran Harvey	Classical Performer of the Year	Won
1998	Bernadette Balkus and Michael Kieran Harvey	Classical Performer of the Year	Won
1999	Michael Kieran Harvey	Classical Performer of the Year	Won

=== Sidney Myer Performing Arts Awards ===
The Sidney Myer Performing Arts Awards commenced in 1984 and recognise outstanding achievements in dance, drama, comedy, music, opera, circus and puppetry.

Year	Nominee / work	Award	Result
1994	Michael Kieran Harvey	Individual Award	awarded
