= Iris Johansen =

American writer (born 1938)

- Born: April 7, 1938 (age 88); St. Louis, Missouri, U.S.
- Occupation: Novelist
- Children: 2
- Writing career
- Period: 1983–present
- Genres: Romance fiction, suspense fiction, crime fiction
- Website: www.irisjohansen.com

Iris Johansen (born April 7, 1938 in St. Louis, Missouri) is an American writer of crime fiction, suspense fiction, and romance novels.

== Career ==
Iris Johansen left a job as an airline reservations agent in the early 1980s to begin writing romance novels. She changed direction slightly and began writing historical romantic suspense novels in 1991 with the publication of The Wind Dancer. She settled in to suspense writing as her main genre with the crime fiction thriller Ugly Duckling, published in 1996 and soon after became a New York Times bestselling author.

== Film adaptation ==
In 2011, the second novel in Johansen's Eve Duncan series was made in to a Lifetime film adaptation, The Killing Game, starring Laura Prepon as forensic sculptor Eve Duncan. This film adaptation was directed by Bobby Roth.

== Awards ==
- 1996 Romantic Times Historical Romance Winner
- 1999 Romantic Times Suspense Winner
- 2016 Romantic Times Career Achievement - Thriller Winner

== Personal life ==
Johansen lives in Georgia, and is married. Her son, Roy Johansen, is an Edgar Award–winning screenwriter and novelist. Iris and Roy have written the Kendra Michaels books series together. Her daughter, Tamara, contributes as her research assistant.

== Works ==
=== Contemporary romance novels ===
- Stormy Vows (1983)
- Tempest at Sea (1983)
- Reluctant Lark (1983)
- The Bronzed Hawk (1983)
- The Lady and the Unicorn (1984)
- Return to Santa Flores (1984)
- No Red Roses (1984)
- White Satin (1985)
- Blue Velvet (1985)
- The Forever Dream (December 1985)
- The Spellbinder (Louis Benoit; 1987)
- Strong, Hot Winds (1988)
- Wicked Jake Darcy (1989)
- One Touch of Topaz (1990)
- An Unexpected Song (1990)
- Tender Savage (1990)
- Winter Bride (1992)
- Star-Spangled Bride (1993)

=== Historical romance ===
- Last Bridge Home (1992)
- The Tiger Prince (January 1993)
- The Magnificent Rogue (September 1993)
- Midnight Warrior (August 1994)
- The Beloved Scoundrel (September 1994)
- Dark Rider (May 1995)
- The Treasure (December 2008)

=== Sedikhan Series ===
List of series

- The Golden Barbarian (March 1992)
- The Golden Valkyrie (1984)
- The Trustworthy Redhead (Louis Benoit; 1984)
- Capture the Rainbow (1984)
- Touch the Horizon (1984)
- A Summer Smile (1985)
- And the Desert Blooms (1986)
- Always (1986)
- Everlasting (1986)
- Til the End of Time (1987)
- Last Bridge Home (September 1987)
- Across the River of Yesterday (1987)
- Starlight, Starbright (1988)
- Man From Half Moon Bay (1988)
- Blue Skies and Shining Promises (1988)
- Magnificent Folly (1989)
- Notorious (1990)
- A Tough Man to Tame (1991)

=== Delaney Series ===
List of series

- This Fierce Splendor (1988)
- Wild Silver (1988)
- Satin Ice (1988)
- The Delaney Christmas Carol (1992) w/ Kay Hooper

=== The Delaneys of Killaroo Series ===
List of series

- Matilda, the Adventuress (1987)

=== The Shamrock Trinity Series ===
List of series

- York, The Renegade (1986)

=== Lion's Bride Series ===
List of series

- Lion's Bride (February 1996)
- The Treasure (December 2008)

=== The Wind Dancer series ===
- The Wind Dancer (February 1991)
- Storm Winds (June 1991)
- Reap the Wind (October 1991; a completely revised edition came out in 2002)
- Final Target (May 2001)

=== Featuring Eve Duncan ===
1. The Face of Deception (October 1998)
2. The Killing Game (September 1999)
3. The Search (June 2000)
4. Body of Lies (March 2002)
5. Dead Aim (April 2003)
6. Blind Alley (September 2004)
7. Countdown (May 2005)
8. Stalemate (December 2006)
9. Quicksand (April 2008)
10. Blood Game (October 2009)
11. Eight Days to Live (April 2010)
12. Chasing the Night (October 2010)
13. Eve (April 2011)
14. Quinn (July 2011)
15. Bonnie (October 2011)
16. Sleep No More (October 2012)
17. Taking Eve (April 2013)
18. Hunting Eve (July 2013)
19. Silencing Eve (October 2013)
20. Shadow Play (September 2015)
21. Hide Away (April 2016)
22. Night and Day (July 2016)
23. Mind Game (October 2017)
24. Shattered Mirror (April 2018)
25. Vendetta (October 2018)
26. Dark Tribute (March 2019)
27. Smokescreen (July 2019)
28. The Persuasion (June 2020)
29. The Bullet (June 2021)
30. A Face to Die For (June 2022)
31. Captive (September 2022)
32. The Survivor (June 2023)

=== Featuring Catherine Ling ===
1. Chasing the Night (October 2010)
2. What Doesn't Kill You (April 2012)
3. Live to See Tomorrow (April 2014)
4. Your Next Breath (April 2015)
5. Vendetta (October 2018)

=== Standalone novels ===
- The Ugly Duckling (May 1996)
- Long After Midnight (March 1997)
- And Then You Die... (January 1998)
- No One to Trust (October 2002)
- Fatal Tide (September 2003)
- Firestorm (March 2004)
- On The Run (December 2005)
- Killer Dreams (May 2006)
- Pandora's Daughter (October 2007)
- Dark Summer (October 2008)
- Deadlock (April 2009)
- The Perfect Witness (September 2014)
- No Easy Target (April 2017)
- Chaos (September 2020)
- On the Hunt (2024)

=== With Roy Johansen ===
==== Standalone ====
- Storm Cycle (July 2009)

==== Featuring Hannah Bryson ====
1. Silent Thunder (July 2008)
2. Shadow Zone (July 2010)

==== Featuring Kendra Michaels ====
1. With Open Eyes (June 2012) [e-book short story]
2. Close Your Eyes (July 2012)
3. Sight Unseen (July 2014)
4. The Naked Eye (July 2015)
5. Night Watch (October 2016)
6. Look Behind You (July 2017)
7. Double Blind (July 2018)
8. Hindsight (January 2020)
9. Blink of an Eye (February 2021)
10. Killer View (2022; written by Roy Johansen with a foreword by Iris Johansen)
11. More Than Meets The Eye (2023)
12. Flashback (2024)
