= HM Prison Bendigo =

Australian prison

Coordinates: 36°45′16″S 144°16′49″E

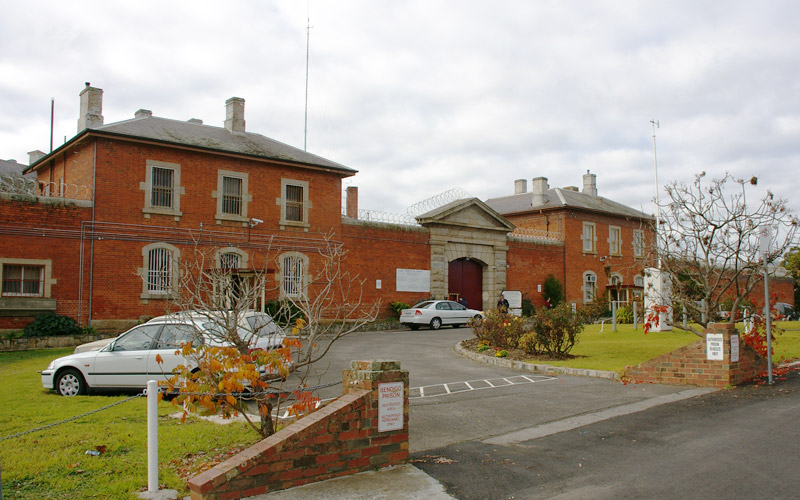
- Bendigo Prison shortly after its closure in 2004.
- Interactive map of HM Prison Bendigo
- Location: Bendigo, Victoria
- Security class: Medium Security
- Capacity: 85
- Opened: 1863
- Closed: 2004
- Managed by: Corrections Victoria

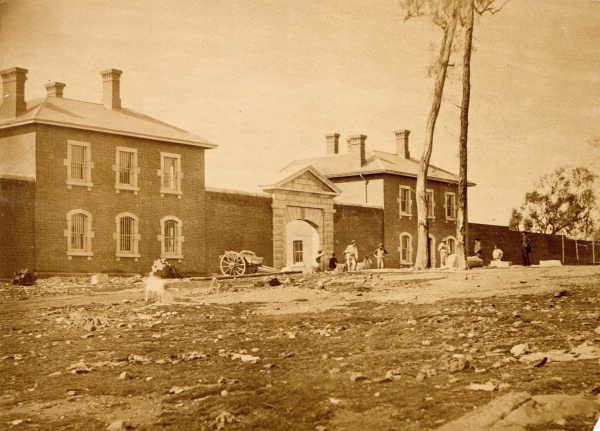
Bendigo Gaol, 1861

HM Prison Bendigo was a medium security prison facility located in Bendigo, Victoria, Australia. Constructed in the early 1863, the prison officially closed in 2004, and has since been converted into Ulumbarra Theatre, one of the city's largest performing arts venues. Construction on the prison began in the late 1850s and was originally housed both male and female inmates before they were relocated in 1896. In 1942, the prison was handed over to the Commonwealth Government for use as a military prison, though this arrangement ended in 1947. In 1950, the facility underwent refurbishment to be reopened as a state government prison again.

== Executions ==
| Name | Year of birth | Date of execution | Crime |
|---|---|---|---|
| Edward Hunter | 1812 | 27 November 1885 | Murder of James Power at Charlton. |
| William Harrison | | 18 March 1889 | Murder of John Duggan near Bendigo. |
| Charles John Hall | 1872 | 13 September 1897 | For the murder of his wife Minnie Hall. |
