= Horticultural Hall (Melbourne) =

Coordinates: 37°48′26.57″S 144°57′59.4″E

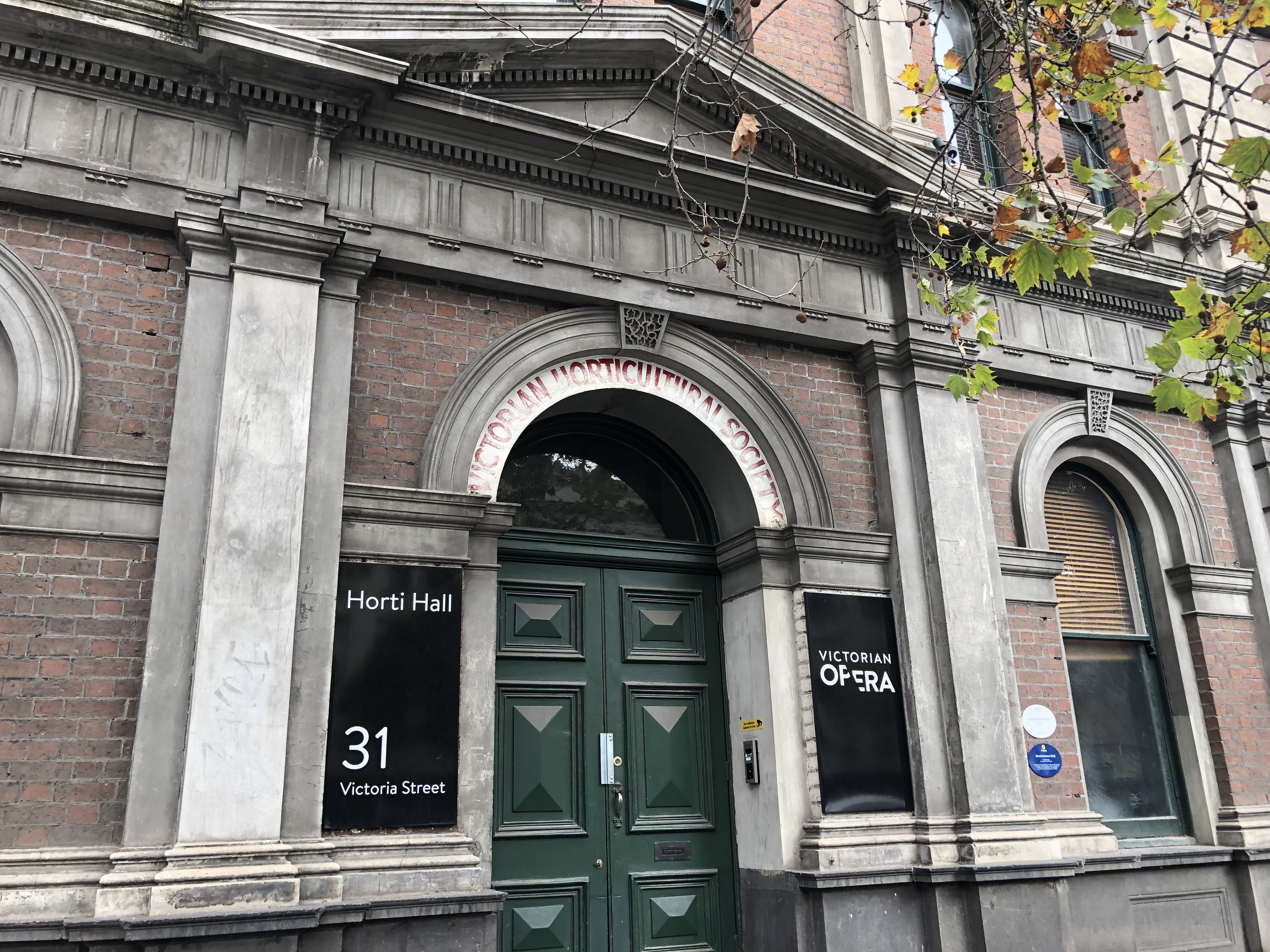
Horticultural Hall in Melbourne

Horticultural Hall (also known as 'Horti Hall') is a building in Melbourne, Australia located on Victoria Street near the corner of Russell Street.

The hall was commissioned by the Victorian Horticultural Improvement Society and opened in 1873. The two-storey brick building facing Victoria Street was added in 1878.

Over its history it has housed many different organisations and events. It is currently the headquarters for Victorian Opera.
