= The Killing Game (2011 film) =

2011 film directed by Bobby Roth

The Killing Game is a 2011 Lifetime Original Movie based on the novel The Killing Game by Iris Johansen. It was directed by Bobby Roth. The film premiered on Lifetime on October 30, 2011.

== Plot ==
Forensic sculptor Eve Duncan who, 10 years after the disappearance and murder of her seven-year-old daughter Bonnie, is contacted by a man claiming to be her killer. Taunted by the man's mysterious clues about Bonnie's case, Eve becomes involved in his sadistic game when he threatens to kill another little girl that he targeted because she resembles her precious daughter. Memories haunt her as she is caught in a web of deceit and gambles with her own life tracking down the deadly serial killer in the hopes of saving the girl's life's and discovering Bonnie's final resting place.

== Cast ==
- Laura Prepon as Eve Duncan
- Ty Olsson as Joe Quinn
- Kavan Smith as Mark
- Teryl Rothery as Sarah Patrick
- Brian Markinson as Spiro
- Naomi Judd as Sandra Duncan
- Jamie Bloch as Jane
- Laura Wilson as Debby Jordan
- Ian Butcher as Robert Fraser
- Kathryn Dobbs as Nancy Taylor

== Reception ==
Released around Halloween, 2011, the TV reviewer David Hinckley of the New York Daily News said, the movie "provides a holiday-appropriate way to wrap up Halloween while you're unwrapping the candy corn." He says the movie may have trouble competing against other police procedurals then common on television at the time: "While Prepon does a good job conveying Eve's controlled desperation, with a mix of shrewd insight and world-weary self-protection, she's also got a lot of competition these days from women playing smart investigators. Kyra Sedgwick, Dana Delany, Maria Bello. It's a tough crowd to stand out in."
