= La bella dormente nel bosco =

Opera by Ottorino Respighi

- Opera by Ottorino Respighi
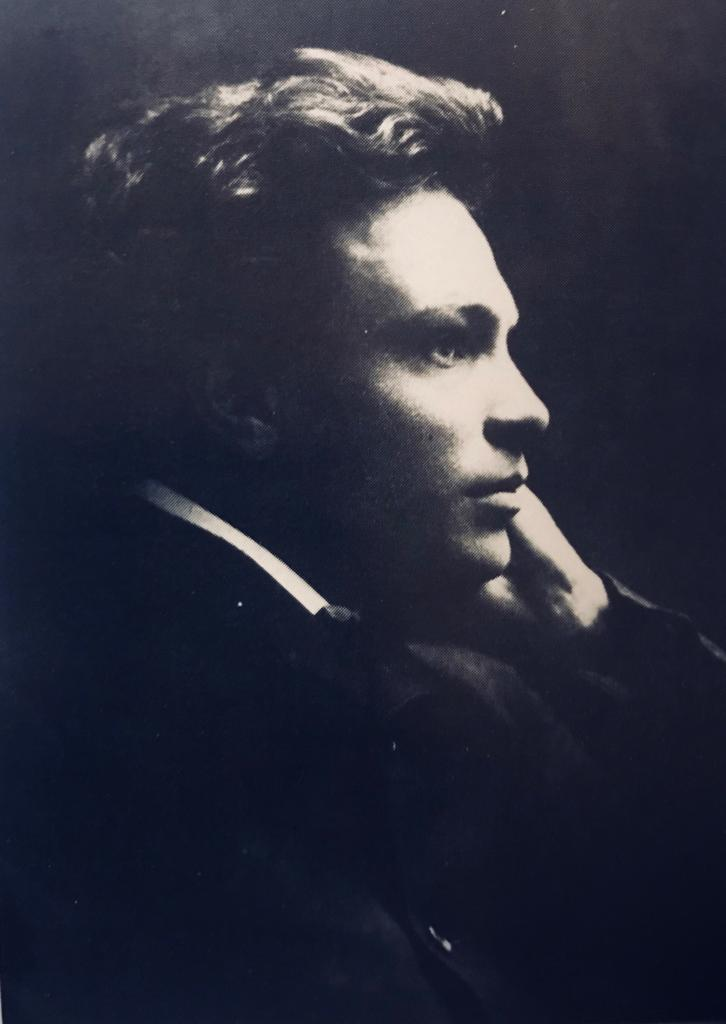
- Respighi in 1912
- Librettist: Gian Bistolfi
- Language: Italian
- Based on: Sleeping Beauty by Charles Perrault
- Premiere: 13 April 1922; Teatro Odescalchi, Rome

La bella dormente nel bosco (The sleeping beauty in the woods) is an opera in three acts by Ottorino Respighi to a libretto by Gian Bistolfi based on Charles Perrault's fairy tale "Sleeping Beauty".

The first version of this opera premiered in the Teatro Odescalchi in Rome on 13 April 1922, at that time, it is often claimed, entitled La bella addormentata nel bosco, an assertion denied by Giangiorgio Satragni. It was a version written for the Italian marionettist Vittorio Podrecca, who was director of a marionette company called Teatro dei Piccoli (Theater for Children). The play was interpreted by marionettes, but it was accompanied by orchestra and singers. The cast of the première included the soprano Cisse Vaughan and the mezzo-soprano Evelina Levi. The performance was a success, with "many curtain calls for the composer", and was judged as an "art jewel".

A revised version was performed at the Teatro di Torino, Turin, on 9 April 1934, as La bella dormente nel bosco. The cast included Graziella Gazzera Valle (Princess), Magda Piccarolo (Blue Fairy, Nightingale), Angelina Rossetti (Spindle, Duchess, Cat), Maria Benedetti (Queen, Cuckoo, Old lady), Vincenzo Capponi (Prince, Jester) and Egisto Busacchi (King, Woodcutter, Ambassador).

A further posthumous version, revised by Gian Luca Tocchi and by the widow of the composer, Elsa Respighi, was performed in the Teatro Rossini in Turin on 13 June 1967.

== Roles ==
Roles, voice types, premiere cast
Role	Voice type
The blue fairy	soprano
The king	baritone
The queen	contralto
The princess	soprano
The prince	tenor
The green fairy	speaking role
The cuckoo	mezzo-soprano
The ambassador	baritone
The jester	tenor
The little old lady	mezzo-soprano
The spindle	mezzo-soprano
The frog	mezzo-soprano
The cat	contralto
A woodcutter	baritone
The duchess	soprano
The nightingale	soprano
Four doctors	tenor, bass, bass, bass
Frog, fairies, courtiers, stars, mourners, spiders, woodcutters. Echoing voices. Chorus

== Instrumentation ==
La bella addormentata nel bosco (version 1922) is scored for the following instruments:

flute, oboe, clarinet, bassoon, horn, trumpet, trombone, triangle, drum, cymbals, bell, handbells, celesta, harpsichord, strings.

La bella dormente nel bosco (version 1934) is instead scored for the following instruments:

flute, oboe, English horn, clarinet, bassoon, horn, trumpet, trombone, piano, drum kit, strings.

== Recordings ==
1994: Adriano, Slovak Radio Symphony Orchestra (Bratislava), Slovak Philharmonic Chorus, CD Marco Polo Cat. 8.223742

King/Woodcutter: Richard Haan
Queen/Duchess: Denisa Slepkovská
Princess: Janas Valásková
Prince: Guillermo Dominguez
Blue fairy/Nightingale: Adriana Kohutkova

Old lady/Green fairy: Ivana Czaková
Cuckoo/Cat: Dagmar Pecková
Frog/Spindle: Henrietta Lednárová
Jester: Igor Pasek
Ambassador: Ján Durco

- Respighi: La bella dormente nel bosco, Veta Pilipenko (La Regina/La Vecchietta/La Rana), Angela Nisi (La Principessa), Antonio Gandia (Il Principe Aprile), Vincenzo Taormina (Il Re/L'Ambasciatore), Shoushik Barsoumian (La Fata Azzurra), Lara Rotili (Il Gatto/La Duchessa/ Il Cucolo), Claudia Urru (Il Fuso/L'Usignolo), Orchestra e Coro del Teatro Lirico Di Cagliari, Donato Renzetti 2020 Naxos DVD Blu-Ray
