= Hobart Baroque Festival =

The Hobart Baroque Festival was a Music festival of Baroque music that took place in the city of Hobart, Tasmania. There were two events held under the name. In 2015, the festival was moved to Brisbane as Brisbane Baroque.

== 2013 festival ==
The 2013 festival featured performances by Russian soprano Julia Lezhneva and Spanish countertenor Xavier Sabata.

== 2014 festival ==
Artists featured in the 2014 festival included Julia Lezhneva.
