= Ulumbarra Theatre =

Australian theatre venue

- HM Prison Bendigo, Sandhurst Gaol
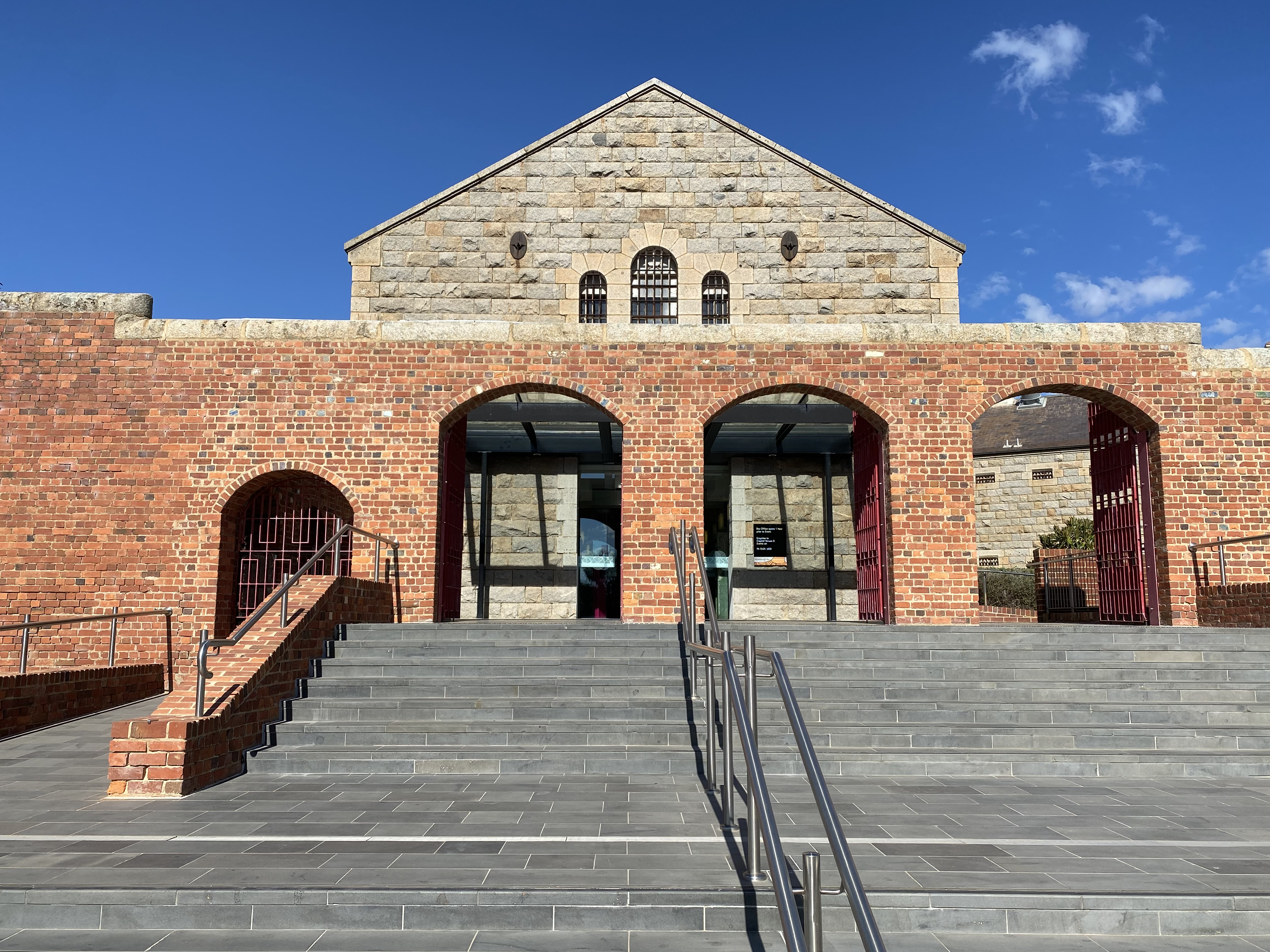
- Front entrance
- Interactive map of Ulumbarra Theatre
- Address: 10 Gaol Rd; Bendigo, Victoria; Australia
- Coordinates: 36.75416°S 144.28035°E
- Owner: City of Greater Bendigo
- Capacity: 953

Construction
- Opened: 2015
- Years active: 2015-present
- Architect: Y2 Architecture

Website
- https://www.bendigoregion.com.au/arts-culture-theatres/space/ulumbarra-theatre

The Ulumbarra Theatre is a 953 seat Australian theatre in Bendigo, Victoria.

The stage is in a Black box style and equipped with a fly system. It opened in 2015 and was estimated to cost $25,580,000 on the site of the Sandhurst Gaol which closed in 2004. Bendigo Senior Secondary College and Ulumbarra Theatre share some amenities such as studios and a bar. Ulumbarra was designed by Young Lehmann & Co Pty Ltd, trading as Y2 Architecture. The principal architects were Garry Thompson and Matthew Dwyer. Bendigo Venues & Events administer this and several other cultural venues in Bendigo.

The word "Ulumbarra" comes from the Djadjawurrung language and means "gather together" or "meeting place".

== Awards ==
- Performing Arts Connections Australian Venue of the Year 2017.

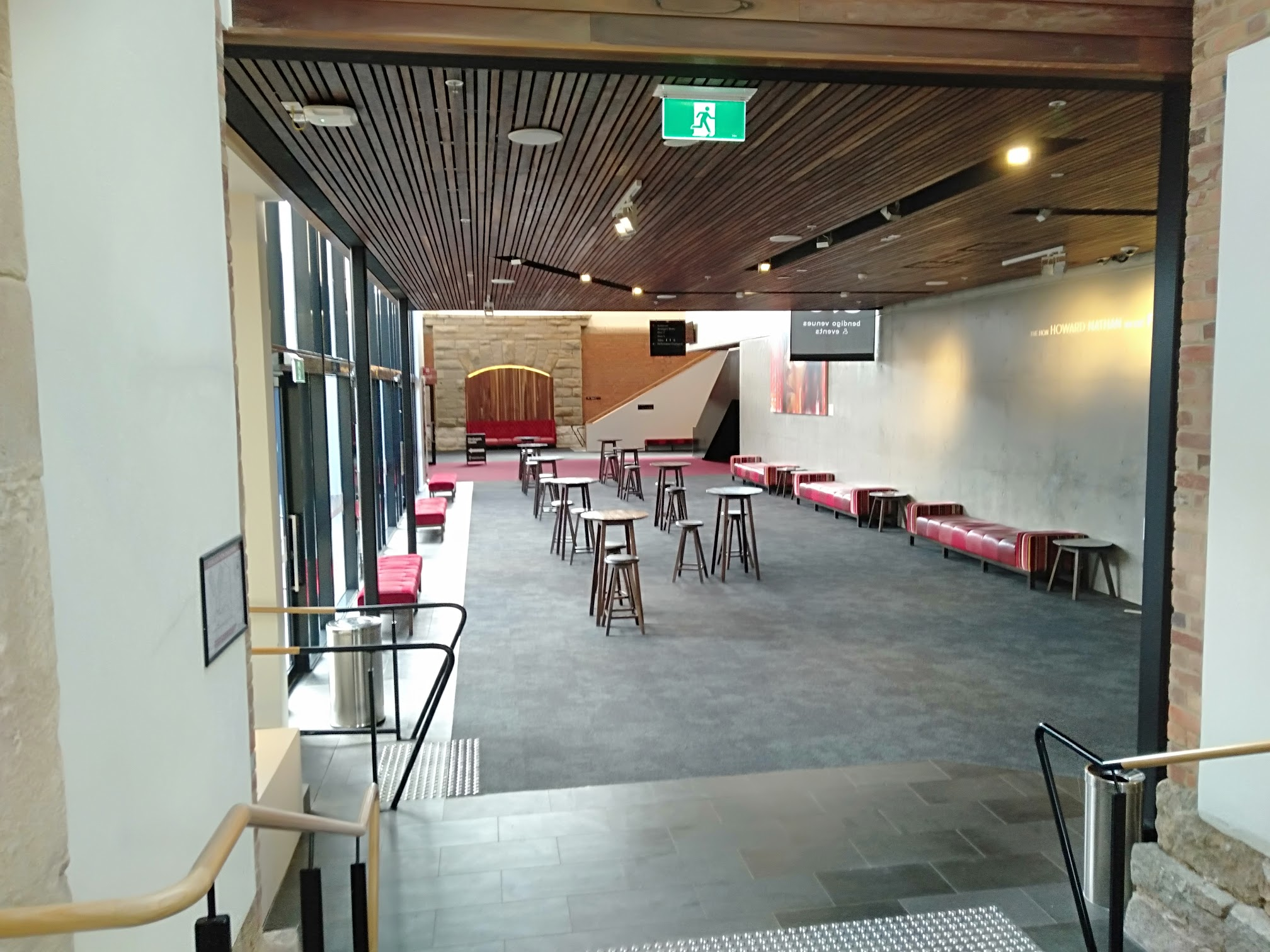
The foyer in the Ulumbarra
