= Victorian Opera =

Opera company in Victoria, Australia founded 2005

- Formation: 2005
- Type: Opera Company
- Location: Melbourne, Victoria
- Artistic director: Stuart Maunder
- Website: www.victorianopera.com.au

Victorian Opera is an opera company based in Melbourne, Victoria, Australia. The company was founded in 2005 by the Victorian Government as a replacement for the Victoria State Opera. It commenced operations in January 2006 with Richard Gill as Artistic Director. Stuart Maunder is the current Artistic Director. The company is supported through government funding, patron contributions and corporate sponsorship.

== Seasons ==
=== 2006 (inaugural) season ===
Victorian Opera's first production was Britten's Noye's Fludde, performed by the Victorian Youth Opera from 30 June to 2 July 2006. It was a collaboration with the Victorian College of the Arts' School of Production, whose students designed and crewed the show. This was followed by an Opera Gala Concert on 15 July 2006, at Melbourne's Hamer Hall, accompanied by Orchestra Victoria under the baton of Richard Gill.

The company's inaugural mainstage production was Mozart's Così fan tutte, directed by Jean-Pierre Mignon and presented at Her Majesty's Theatre, Melbourne between 19 and 26 August 2006. The principals were Gary Rowley (Don Alfonso), Christopher Saunders (Ferrando), Christopher Tonkin (Guglielmo), Antoinette Halloran (Fiordiligi), Jacqueline Dark (Dorabella) and Tiffany Speight (Despina).

Bach's St John Passion was performed on 8 September, at St Michael's Uniting Church, Collins Street, Melbourne. The principals were Matthew Davine (The Evangelist). A concert version of Brian Howard's Metamorphosis was performed on 3 November, at Melba Hall, Conservatorium of Music, University of Melbourne which completed the Victorian Opera's first season.

=== 2007 season ===
The historic Horti Hall in Victoria Street, Melbourne, became the company's permanent headquarters in 2007.

The company's second season commenced on 17 February 2007, with a concert presentation at Hamer Hall of a double bill of Stravinsky's Les noces and Oedipus Rex, with Richard Gill conducting Orchestra Victoria, and a cast which included most of the coming season's principals and the Victorian Opera Chorus.

Between 1–3 June, the Victorian Youth Opera, again in collaboration with the Victorian College of the Arts School of Production, presented an interpretation of Andersen's story The Snow Queen, by Grahame Dudley and Nick Enright.

A new production of The Love of the Nightingale by Richard Mills and Timberlake Wertenbaker, directed by Lindy Hume, premiered at Her Majesty's Theatre on 27 and 29 July. Based on the 3000-year-old legend of Philomela and Procne, it featured Leanne Kenneally (Philomele), Elizabeth Campbell (Niobe), James Egglestone (Captain/Hippolytus), Adrian McEniery (First Soldier/Pandion), Samuel Dundas (Second Soldier), Sarah Crane (Hero), Sarah Cole (Iris) and Roxanne Hislop (Juno). Once again Richard Gill conducted Orchestra Victoria.

Gluck's Orphée et Eurydice was performed at Her Majesty's Theatre between 6–13 August in the Berlioz version, directed by Stephen Page, with mezzo-soprano Dimity Shepherd as Orphée, Alison Rae Jones (Eurydice) and Jacqueline Porter (L'Amour). The Victorian Opera Chorus and Orchestra Victoria were conducted by Matthew Coorey.

The previous season's production of Così fan tutte toured metropolitan and regional Victoria during October and November. Sung in English, with a chamber ensemble drawn from Orchestra Victoria, and conducted by Nicholas Carter, only Gary Rowley (Don Alfonso) and Jacqueline Dark (Dorabella) remained from the original cast, with James Egglestone as Ferrando, Samuel Dundas (Guglielmo), Mylinda Joyce (Fiordiligi) and Jacqueline Porter (Despina).

=== 2008 season ===
The opening performance of the year was a Gala Concert on 16 February at Hamer Hall. Entitled Puccini ~ The Sacred and Profane, it consisted of Puccini's Messa di Gloria, several well-known arias from his operas, and the complete Act II of La bohème.

The season's new contemporary production was the chamber opera Through the Looking Glass by Alan John and Andrew Upton, directed by Michael Kantor, and performed at the Merlyn Theatre, CUB Malthouse, South Melbourne, 17–31 May. The small cast of David Hobson, Dimity Shepherd, Suzanne Johnston, Margaret Haggard, Gary Rowley and Kanen Breen, sang multiple roles, and a small on-stage ensemble was conducted by Richard Gill. (Won 2008 Green Room Award for Best New Opera.)

Monteverdi's The Coronation of Poppea, directed by Kate Cherry, was presented at the Australian National Academy of Music, South Melbourne Town Hall, 18–26 July. The orchestra, arranged in 17th-century fashion on either side of the performance space were led by Richard Gill, conducting from one of the two harpsichords. Artists performing in one of the earliest of all operas (1643) were: Tiffany Speight (Poppea), countertenors David Hansen (Nerone) and Daniel Goodwin (Ottone), Sally Wilson (Ottavia/La Fortuna), Jacqueline Porter (Drusilla/La Virtù), Paul Hughes (Seneca), Isabel Veale (Arnalta/Nutrice), Adrian McEniery (Luciano/Primo Soldato), Jessica Aszodi (Damigella), Edmond Choo (Liberto), Laurence Meikle (Mercurio/Littore) and Jacob Caine (Secundo Soldato). (The production shared the 2008 Green Room Award for Best Opera with Opera Australia's Arabella, and Tiffany Speight received a Helpmann Award for Best Female Opera Performer in a Principal Role.)

Between 11–21 August, Donizetti's The Elixir of Love was presented at the Merlyn Theatre, CUB Malthouse, South Melbourne. Directed by Stephen Medcalf, with Orchestra Victoria conducted by Warwick Stengards, with alternating casts of David Hobson/Roy Best (Nemorino), Antoinette Halloran/Elena Xanthoudakis (Adina), Christopher Tonkin/Samuel Dundas (Sergeant Belcore), Roger Lemke/Roger Howell (Dulcamara) and Danielle Calder (Gianetta).

Closing the 2008 season were five performances by the Victorian Youth Opera of Malcolm Williamson's The Happy Prince, based on the story by Oscar Wilde, between 3–5 October at the Victorian College of the Arts.

=== 2009 season ===
The Victorian Opera's 2009 season began on 21 February, with a Gala Concert at Hamer Hall. The programme consisted of Bartók's Bluebeard's Castle, with Grant Smith (Narrator), Andrew Collis (Bluebeard) and Lecia Robertson (Judith); and Orff's Carmina Burana with soloists Joanna Cole (soprano), Tobias Cole (counter-tenor) and Gary Rowley (baritone). The Victorian Opera Chorus and Orchestra Victoria will be conducted by Richard Gill.

Mozart's Don Giovanni was presented at The National Theatre, St. Kilda, in March, with Richard Gill conducting the first three performances and Nicholas Carter the remaining three. The production was directed by Jean-Pierre Mignon, with baritones Samuel Dundas (Don Giovanni) and Andrew Collis (Leporello); bass baritone Anthony Mackey (Masetto); and bass Steven Gallop (The Commendatore). The opera's other roles were sung by tenor James Egglestone (Don Ottavio) and sopranos Caroline Wenbourne (Donna Anna), Tiffany Speight (Donna Elvira) and Michelle Buscemi (Zerlina). A tour of regional Victoria followed the Melbourne season.

The new Australian work of the 2009 season was the Andrew Ford/Sue Smith chamber opera Rembrandt's Wife, performed at the Merlyn Theatre in April. Directed by Talya Masel and conducted by Richard Gill, the cast consisted of Paul Biencourt (The Pretender); Roxanne Hislop (Geertje Dircx); Jacqueline Porter (Saskia/Hendrickje Stoffels) and Gary Rowley (Rembrandt van Rijn).

The company's first performances at Arts Centre Melbourne was between 21–27 July when Strauss' Ariadne auf Naxos, directed by James McCaughey, was presented at The Playhouse. Richard Gill conducted Orchestra Victoria, with artists Elizabeth Stannard (Prima Donna/Ariadne); Jacqueline Dark (Composer); Theresa Borg (Zerbinetta); Gary Rowley (Music Master); Adrian McEniery (Dancing Master); Samuel Dundas (Harlequin); John MacMaster (Tenor/Bacchus); Paul Hughes (Wig-maker); Roxanne Hislop (Dryad); Grant Smith (Haushoffmeister); Jessica Aszodi (Echo); Melanie Adams (Naiad); Paul Biencourt (Brighella); Jacob Caine (Scaramuccio/Officer); and Anthony Mackey (Truffaldino/Lackey).

The Melbourne Recital Centre opened in February 2009, and the company performed Handel's Xerxes in its principal space Elisabeth Murdoch Hall in August. In a co-production with The NBR New Zealand Opera directed by Roger Hodgman, early music expert John O'Donnell conducted a specialised baroque orchestra and a cast including counter-tenor Tobias Cole (Xerxes); mezzo-sopranos Roxanne Hislop (Amastre) and Dimity Shepherd (Arsamene); sopranos Tiffany Speight (Romilda) and Jessica Aszodi (Atalanta); baritone Gary Rowley (Elviro) and bass Steven Gallop (Ariodate).

The final production of the 2009 season was Britten's The Little Sweep, presented by the Victorian Youth Opera in five performances between 2–4 October at Horti Hall in Melbourne.

=== 2010 season ===
The State Government's increased the Company's annual grant to $3.79 million in 2010. The company's fifth season included:

A free summer concert – Opera in the Bowl with the Melbourne Symphony Orchestra on 27 February at the Sidney Myer Music Bowl.

A gala concert presentation of The Damnation of Faust by Berlioz on 19 February at Hamer Hall, The Arts Centre. Soloists included Julian Gavin (Faust); Tania Ferris (Marguerite); Pelham Andrews (Mephistophélès); and David Hibbard (Brander). The Victorian Opera Chorus and Orchestra Victoria conducted by Richard Gill.

The first main-stage productions of the year between 10 and 20 March at The Arts Centre, Playhouse, with the double-bill of Walton's The Bear and Ibert's Angélique. Directed by Talya Masel and conducted by Ollivier-Philippe Cuneo.

A co-production with Malthouse Theatre of The Threepenny Opera by Kurt Weill and Bertolt Brecht in the Merlyn Theatre between 28 May and 17 June. Directed by Michael Kantor and conducted by Richard Gill.

The Turn of the Screw, an operatic ghost story by Britten.

Handel's Julius Caesar, presented at the Elisabeth Murdoch Hall, Melbourne Recital Centre, 20–30 July, conducted by Richard Gill and directed by former Australian Ballet principal Stephen Heathcote.

Two world premieres by the Victorian Youth Opera. Firstly, The Parrot Factory a newly commissioned work by Frederick and Mary Davidson, performed at the CUB Malthouse Merlyn Theatre 1–5 October. Secondly, The Cockatoos by Sarah de Jong and Sarah Carradine was presented at the New Ballroom, Trades Hall, 10–12 December.

=== 2011 season ===
- Verdi Gala – La traviata / Il trovatore
- Mozart's The Magic Flute
- How To Kill Your Husband (And Other Handy Household Hints) (Alan John and Timothy Daly from the novel by Kathy Lette)
- Albert Herring (Benjamin Britten)
- Baroque triple bill – Bach's The Fight Between Phoebus and Pan and Coffee Cantata, and Monteverdi's The Fight Between Tancredi and Clorinda

=== 2012 season ===
- Stravinsky's The Rake's Progress
- The Play of Daniel (the Youth of Beauvais)
- Midnight Son (Gordon Kerry / Louis Nowra) – world premiere
- Mozart's The Marriage of Figaro
- Double bill – de Falla's Master Peter's Puppet Show ( Carter's What Next?

The 2012 season was Richard Gill's final season as Artistic Director, and concluded with a Gala concert in his honour on 19 December 2012.

=== 2013 season ===
The 2013 season marked the first of Richard Mills as Artistic Director.

- Sleeping Beauty
- Opera on a White Night
- Adams' Nixon in China
- Sunday in the Park with George (Stephen Sondheim & James Lapine)
- María de Buenos Aires (Piazzolla)
- Puss in Boots (Xavier Montsalvatge)
- The Magic Pudding – The Opera
- Rush Hour

=== 2014 season ===
The 2014 season was announced on 28 August 2013.

- Games of Love and Chance (Concert with Monash Academy Orchestra)
- La traviata
- Hansel and Gretel
- Into the Woods
- Norma
- The Riders (based on the Novel by Tim Winton); at the APRA Music Awards of 2015 it won the Vocal / Choral Work of the Year category.
- The Play of Herod

=== 2015 season ===
The 2015 season was announced on 7 August 2014.

- The Flying Dutchman
- I puritani
- Sweeney Todd: The Demon Barber of Fleet Street
- The Grumpiest Boy in the World
- The Seven Deadly Sins

=== 2016 season ===
The 2016 season was announced on 20 August 2015.

- Voyage to the Moon (based on Orlando furioso), a collaboration between Victorian Opera and Musica Viva Australia
- Banquet of Secrets
- Cendrillon (Cinderella)
- The Pied Piper
- Laughter and Tears, a collaboration between Victorian Opera and Circus Oz
- Four Saints in Three Acts

=== 2017 season ===
The 2017 season was announced on 13 September 2016.

- Tis Pity, an Operatic Fantasia on Selling the Skin and the Teeth, 4–8 February, Melbourne Recital Centre
- La bella dormente nel bosco (The Sleeping Beauty), 11–18 March, Arts Centre Melbourne, Playhouse
- The Princess and the Pea, 25 March, Arts Centre Melbourne, Playhouse
- La sonnambula, 5 May, Arts Centre Melbourne, Hamer Hall
- The Cunning Little Vixen, 22 June – 1 July, Arts Centre Melbourne, Playhouse
- The Black Rider: The Casting of the Magic Bullets, 15 September – 8 October, a co-production between Victorian Opera and Malthouse Theatre, Melbourne

=== 2018 season ===
The 2018 season was announced on 27 September 2017 at Arts Centre Melbourne, Playhouse

- William Tell(Guillaume Tell), 14–19 July 2018, Palais Theatre, St Kilda
- The Capulets and the Montagues (I Capuleti e i Montecchi), 14 September 2018, Hamer Hall
- Pelleas and Melisande (Pelléas et Mélisande), 11–13 October 2018, Palais Theatre, St Kilda
- Lorelei (new work), 3–10 November 2018, The Coopers Malthouse, Merlyn Theatre, Melbourne
- The Magic Pudding – The Opera, 15–17 March 2018 Arts Centre Melbourne, Playhouse
- Hansel and Gretel, 9–12 June 2018, Arts Centre Melbourne, Playhouse

=== 2019 season ===
Victorian Opera's season 2019 was announced on 10 October 2018 at Palais Theatre, St Kilda.

This season marked Victorian Opera's first year as Major Performing Arts company.

- Parsifal, 20–24 February 2019, Palais Theatre, St Kilda
- Alice through the Opera Glass, 14–15 June 2019, Arts Centre Melbourne, Playhouse
- A Little Night Music, 27 June – 6 July 2019, Arts Centre Melbourne, Playhouse
- Heroic Bel Canto, 14 July 2019, Hamer Hall
- The Selfish Giant (new work), 17–19 October 2019, Gasworks Theatre, Albert Park
- The Barber of Seville, 21 November at Princess Theatre, Launceston, 12–14 December at Melbourne Recital Centre

=== 2020 season ===
Victorian Opera launched its Season 2020 on 3 September 2019 at Palais Theatre, St Kilda; the company's largest season to date.

- Salome, 22–27 February 2020, Palais Theatre, St Kilda
- Cendrillon, 12–13 June 2020, Arts Centre Melbourne, Playhouse
- Yma Sumac: The Peruvian Songbird, 18–20 June 2020, Arts Centre Melbourne, Playhouse
- Three Tales (new work, based on Flaubert's Three Tales), 26–27 June 2020, Arts Centre Melbourne, Playhouse
- The Who's Tommy, 14–21 August 2020, Palais Theatre, St Kilda
- Die tote Stadt, 21 August 2020, Arts Centre Melbourne, Hamer Hall
- Margaret Fulton: The Musical, 15–19 September 2020, Arts Centre Melbourne, Playhouse
- Die Freunde von Salamanka, 25–26 September 2020, Arts Centre Melbourne, Playhouse
