= Eve Duncan =

Fictional character in novels by Iris Johansen

Eve Duncan is a fictional forensic sculptor in a series of suspense thriller novels by American writer Iris Johansen. Several of the books have been New York Times bestsellers.

The series includes three self-contained trilogies that incorporate familiar characters from the rest of the series while standing on their own: Eve, Quinn, and Bonnie; Taking Eve, Hunting Eve, and Silencing Eve; Shadow Play, Hide Away, and Night and Day.

Laura Prepon portrayed Eve Duncan in a 2011 adaptation of The Killing Game for Lifetime.

== Books ==
1. The Face of Deception (1998)
2. The Killing Game (1999)
3. The Search (2000)
4. Body of Lies (2002)
5. Dead Aim (listed as #4.5 of the Eve Duncan series) (Dec 2002)
6. Blind Alley (2004)
7. Countdown (2005)
8. Stalemate (2006)
9. Quicksand (2008)
10. Blood Game (2009)
11. Eight Days to Live (2010)
12. Chasing the Night (2010)
13. Eve (2011)
14. Quinn (2011)
15. Bonnie (2011)
16. Sleep No More (2012)
17. Taking Eve (2013)
18. Hunting Eve (2013)
19. Silencing Eve (2013)
20. Shadow Play (2015)
21. Hide Away (2016)
22. Night and Day (2016)
23. Mind Game (2017)
24. Shattered Mirror (2018)
25. Vendetta (October 23, 2018)
26. Dark Tribute (March 26, 2019)
27. Smokescreen (2019)
28. The Persuasion (2020)
29. The Bullet (2021)
30. A Face to Die For (2022)
31. Captive (2022)
32. The Survivor (2023)
