= Mark Howett =

Australian theatre and film director

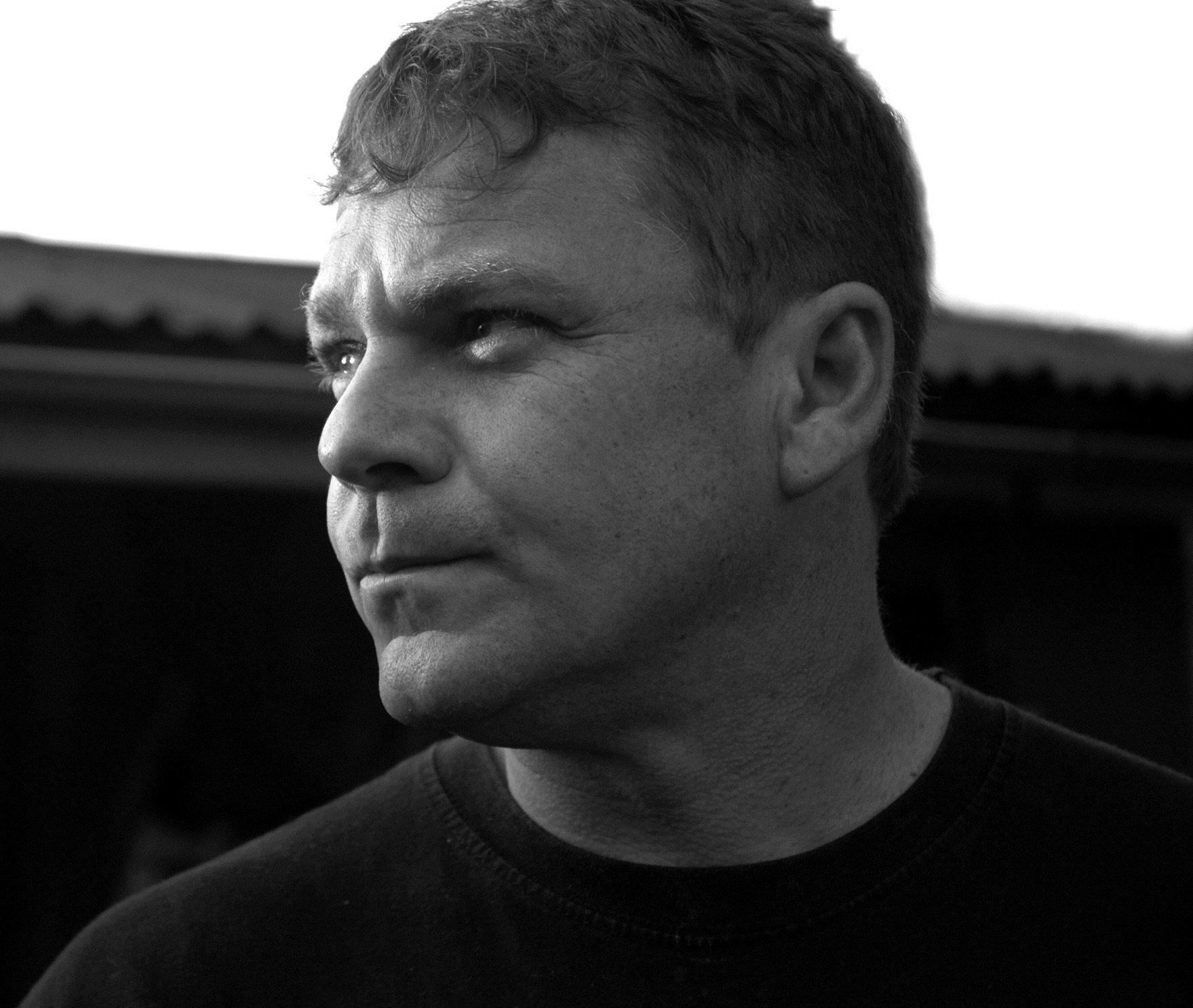
Mark Howett

Western Australian Mark Howett (born 1963) is an Australian director for theatre, dance, opera and film, having started his career initially as a lighting designer. He studied Theatre Design, specialising in Lighting Design at the School of Drama 1981, Yale University. Since 1979, Mark Howett has worked with many international theatre, film, dance, and opera companies. He was a senior creative on productions such as: Sweeney Todd, Royal Opera at Covent Garden, Cabaret at Savoy Theatre West End, Evita at Dominion Theatre West End, A Country Girl at Apollo Theatre West End, Rites Bangarra and Australian Ballet at Paris Opera House, Cloudstreet Co B Belvoir at Brooklyn Academy of Music, and Secret River Sydney Theatre Co to name a few.

Mark is a co-creator of The Farm, which has toured his productions to festivals of Venice Biennial, Sydney, Perth, Singapore, Tanz im August Berlin, Theater Spektacle (Zurich), and the Barbican Theatre London. He recently directed and conceived a German and Australian collaborative dance theatre piece with the Farm Collective called “Good Little Soldier”. In 2005, he directed and co-wrote the ABC short film Gangu Mama as part of the Deadly Yarns initiative for the ABC. Kura Tunga was a highlight for Mark in 2005 working as Cinematographer Lighting and Vision Designer with the Australian Arts Orchestra; the production won the Robert Helpmann Award for Best Presented Concert.

== Biography ==
Mark Howett, born 1963 in Australia, is a director for theatre, dance, opera and film, having started his career initially as a lighting designer.

Since 1979, Mark Howett has worked with many Australian and international theatre, film, dance, and opera companies. He has directed and designed with companies such as:

- Australian Broadcasting Commission
- Opera Australia
- Royal National Theatre
- The Royal Opera at Covent Garden
- The Australian Ballet
- Sydney Theatre Company
- Company B at Belvoir St Theatre
- Bangarra Dance Theatre
- Adelaide Festival
- The Auckland Opera

== Theatre ==
Howett has collaborated with many talented directors such as Neil Armfield, Gale Edwards, Geoffrey Rush, Jim Sharman, George Ogilvy and Francesca Zambello. He recently directed a dance theatre piece which was a German and Australian collaboration with Animal Farm Collective called “Be A Good Little Soldier” which opened in Berlin in 2013. Mark also directed Deckchair Theatre Company’s production of “Strategy of Two Hams” starring Kelton Pell. He was assistant director on “Conversations with the Dead” for Company B Belvoir, and was part of the collaboration team that re-worked the original script. He was also assistant director and designed the lighting and vision for Company B's production of “Gulpilili” starring David Gulpillil, directed by Neil Armfield.

Mark was also one of the artistic directors who developed the opening ceremony, “Kula Pulti”, for the Adelaide Festival in 2000. He designed a twenty-meter fire sculpture and devised the ceremony for an audience of twenty thousand. Making the set and lighting design for “The Island” for Black Swan State Theatre Company gave Mark the chance to work with acclaimed South African Director Jerry Mofokeng during 2004.

Mark has designed the lighting for many productions that have toured extensively in Australia and overseas. “Cloudstreet”, which Howett won the Robert Helpmann Award for Lighting Design 2002, toured to New York at the Brooklyn Academy of Music, National Theatre London and The Kennedy Centre Washington, Zurich, and nationally in Australia. Mark designed the lighting for the Royal Opera at Convent Garden's production of “Sweeney Todd”. Mark's lighting for Opera Australia's production of “For the Love of Three Oranges”, directed by Francesca Zambello, toured in 2007. Redesigning the set and Lighting Design of “Il Trovatore” for Opera Australia was a chance to work with the paintings of Sydney Nolan.

Over the years, Mark has made many collaborative pieces with traditional people from all over his country. In 2003 Mark designed the lighting for the international tour of “Crying Baby” for Stalker Theatre Company, working with the traditional people of Arnhem Land. Howett designed the lighting for Australian Ballet and Bangarra's production of “Rites”, which was simulcast nationally on the Australian Broadcasting Commission, and toured to New York's City Centre in 1999, also playing later at the Paris Opera House.

== Film ==
Mark directed and co-wrote a training film for Humboldt University Berlin called “Studiern fur zwei und Mehr” that won the German Foreign Affairs award for best training film for overseas students. In 2005, Mark directed and co-wrote the Australian Broadcast Commission short film “Gangu Mama” as part of the Deadly Yarns initiative. Mark most recently directed and conceived an improvised short feature “Greenhead” for Push Films in Australia. He has also written his first feature “Be a Good little Soldier,” a family saga about the return of a war veteran and how that impacts on his family and community.

“Kura Tunga” was a highlight for Mark in 2005, working as Cinematographer, Lighting and Vision Designer with the Australian Arts Orchestra. The production won the Robert Helpmann Award for Best Presented Concert.

=== Film Credits ===
- 2006 Gangu Mama on Australian Broadcasting Corporation starring David Noombingara
- 2007 Studieren fuer zwei for Humboldt University Berlin, Germany starring Mary Endo and Marc Iancu
- 2007 Dreams for Schauspielhaus Koeln Heute im Raum Lumina
- 2007 Edgar´s amazing pickle show for modern dance-theatre Edgar

== List of Productions ==
The Rake Progress 1983 Director: Jim Sharman for Opera Australia was his first significant production design. He has worked with the Directors Rufus Norris |The Country Girl 2010|, Gale Edwards | Buried Child, 2002|, Geoffrey Rush Popular Mechanicals, 1994 | Neil Armfield Royal Opera at Convent Garden Sweeney Todd, 2004 | and Francesca Zambello Opera Australia Love of Three Oranges, 2004 |

Many of his works have toured internationally: No Sugar, 1990 Up the Road, 1996 and As You Like It, 2000, Director: Neil Armfield, lighting design and Co-director | Norma 1999, Opera Australia, Director George Ogilvy Lighting Design | Rites, 1999 and Amalgamate, 2006, The Australian Ballet & Bangarra Dance Theatre, Choreographer: Stephen Page, simulcasted by the Australian Broadcasting Commission, touring: City Center, New York, 1999, Théâtre du Châtelet, Paris, 2009, Lighting Design | Crying Baby, 2003, Stalker Theatre Company, Director: Rachel Swain, touring: Cultura Inglesia Festival, São Paulo, Netherlands, Belgium and Ireland, Lighting Design | Conversations With The Dead, 2003, co-director and script development and Gulpilili, 2004, Lighting and Vision Design, Company B Belvoir St.

West End Lighting Design Credits include: A Country Girl 2010 Director Rufus Norris. Dreamboats and Petticoats 2009 Director Bob Thompson Bill Kenwright | A Daughter is a Daughter 2009 Director Roy Marsden | Three Days In May 2011 Director Alan Strachan.

In 2019 Howett devised and co-directed The Line for Co 3 (Dance), lighting and design for Spinifex Gum (Sydney Festival) and his design for the Belvoir Street production of The Secret River toured to London and Edinburgh Festival.

== Past Affiliations ==
- Opera Australia
- The Australian Ballet
- Queensland Theatre Company
- Sydney Theatre Company
- Melbourne Theatre Company
- Black Swan Theatre Company
- Company B
- Bangarra Dance Theatre
- Sasha Waltz
- Royal Opera Covent Garden
- Auckland Opera
- Western Australian Opera
- State Theatre Company of South Australia
- Adelaide Festival of Arts
- Bill Kenwright LTD*Bill Kenwright Productions
- Schauspiel Köln
- PVC Tanz Freiburg

For Company B, he has designed:

- No Sugar
- As You Like It
- David Gulpilil
- Cloudstreet
- Dead Heart
- Aliwa

For Opera Australia, he has designed:

- The Rake's Progress
- Norma
- The Love for Three Oranges (Prokofiev)
- Il Trovatore

For The Australian Ballet, he has designed:

- Rites
- Amalgamate

For Bill Kenwright LTD, he has designed:

- Evita
- Dreamboats and Petticoats
- Joseph and the Amazing Technicolor Dreamcoat
- Blood Brothers

== Awards ==
=== Australian ===
- Helpmann Award 2003 Best lighting design Cloudstreet
- Green Room Award 2005 Best lighting design for Opera The Love for Three Oranges (Prokofiev)
- Helpmann Award 2005 Best presented concert Kura Tunga
- Green Room Award 2009 Best lighting design for Contemporary Dance Roadkill

=== Australian Television Features ===
The Australian Broadcasting Corporation ABC feature Artist in Profile on the Sunday Arts Show 2006.
