= 1990 Australian Film Institute Awards =

Australian film and television award ceremony

32nd Australian Film Institute Awards
- Date: 10 October 1990
- Location: World Congress Centre, Melbourne

Television/radio coverage
- Networks
- ABC-TV

The 32nd Australian Film Institute Awards were awards held by the Australian Film Institute to celebrate the best of Australian films and television of 1990. Twenty films competed in the feature film categories.

== Feature film ==
Best Film: Flirting – Terry Hayes, Doug Mitchell, George Miller; Blood Oath – Charles Waterstreet, Denis Whitburn, Brian Williams; Struck by Lightning – Terry J. Charatsis, Trevor Farrant; The Big Steal – Nadia Tass, David Parker	Best Direction: Ray Argall – Return Home; Stephen Wallace – Blood Oath; Paul Cox – Golden Braid; Jerzy Domaradzki – Struck by Lightning
Best Lead Actor: Max von Sydow – Father; Frankie J. Holden – Return Home; Ben Mendelsohn – The Big Steal; Russell Crowe – The Crossing	Best Lead Actress: Catherine McClements – Weekend With Kate; Kerry Armstrong – Hunting; Claudia Karvan – The Big Steal; Rosanna Arquette – Wendy Cracked a Walnut
Best Supporting Actor: Steve Bisley – The Big Steal; John Polson – Blood Oath; Toshi Shioya – Blood Oath; Bartholomew Rose – Flirting	Best Supporting Actress: Julia Blake – Father; Penne Hackforth-Jones – Kokoda Crescent; Ruth Cracknell – Kokoda Crescent; Maggie King – The Big Steal
Best Screenplay: David Parker – The Big Steal; Denis Whitburn, Brian Williams – Blood Oath; Paul Cox, Barry Dickins – Golden Braid; Trevor Farrant – Struck by Lightning	
Best Cinematography: Jeff Darling – The Crossing; Russell Boyd – Blood Oath; Geoff Burton – Flirting; Nino Gaetano Martinetti – Golden Braid	Best Editing: Robert Gibson – Flirting; Russell Hurley – Golden Braid; Henry Dangar – The Crossing; Robert Gibson – Two Brothers Running
Best Original Music Score: Phil Judd – The Big Steal; Art Phillips – Sher Mountain Killings Mystery; Paul Smyth – Struck by Lightning; Bruce Smeaton – Wendy Cracked a Walnut	Best Sound: Ben Osmo, Gethin Creagh, Roger Savage – Blood Oath; Antony Gray, Ross Linton, Phil Judd – Flirting; Livia Ruzic, James Currie, David Rawlinson – Golden Braid; John Wilkinson, Dean Gawen, Roger Savage – The Big Steal
Best Production Design: Roger Ford – Flirting; Bernard Hides – Blood Oath; Paddy Reardon – The Big Steal; Lawrence Eastwood – Weekend With Kate	Best Costume Design: Roger Kirk – Blood Oath; Aphrodite Kondos – Hunting; Michelle Leonard – Two Brothers Running; Michelle Leonard – Weekend With Kate

== Television ==
Best Mini-Series or Telefeature: Come in Spinner (ABC) – Jan Chapman; The Girl from Tomorrow (Nine Network) – Ron Saunders, Noel Price; Police Crop (ABC) – Rod Allan; The Magistrate (ABC) – Kim Dalton, Chris Warner	Best Television Documentary: In Search of Dr Mabuse (ABC) – Varcha Sidwell; Astonish Me: Graeme Murphy (ABC) – Don Featherstone; Difficult Pleasure: Brett Whiteley (ABC) – Don Featherstone; Victims (Network Ten) – Iain Gillespie, Terry Carlyon
Best Lead Actor in a Mini-Series or Telefeature: Frankie J. Holden – Police Crop (ABC); Rhys McConnochie – Come in Spinner (ABC); Terry Gill – Police Crop (ABC); Franco Nero – The Magistrate (ABC)	Best Lead Actress in a Mini-Series or Telefeature: Rebecca Gibney – Come in Spinner (ABC); Caroline Goodall – Cassidy (ABC); Lisa Harrow – Come In Spinner (ABC); Tracy Mann – How Wonderful (ABC)
Best Achievement in Direction in a Mini-Series or Telefeature: Robert Marchand – Come in Spinner (ABC); Kathy Mueller – The Girl from Tomorrow (Nine Network); Ken Cameron – Police Crop (ABC); Kathy Mueller – The Magistrate (ABC)	Best Screenplay in a Mini-Series or Television Drama: Chris Warner – The Magistrate (ABC); Nick Enright, Lissa Benyon – Come in Spinner (ABC); John Thomson, Mark Shirrefs – The Girl from Tomorrow (Nine Network); Ian David – Police Crop (ABC)
