= Matthew Baker (entertainer) =

American entertainer

Matt Baker
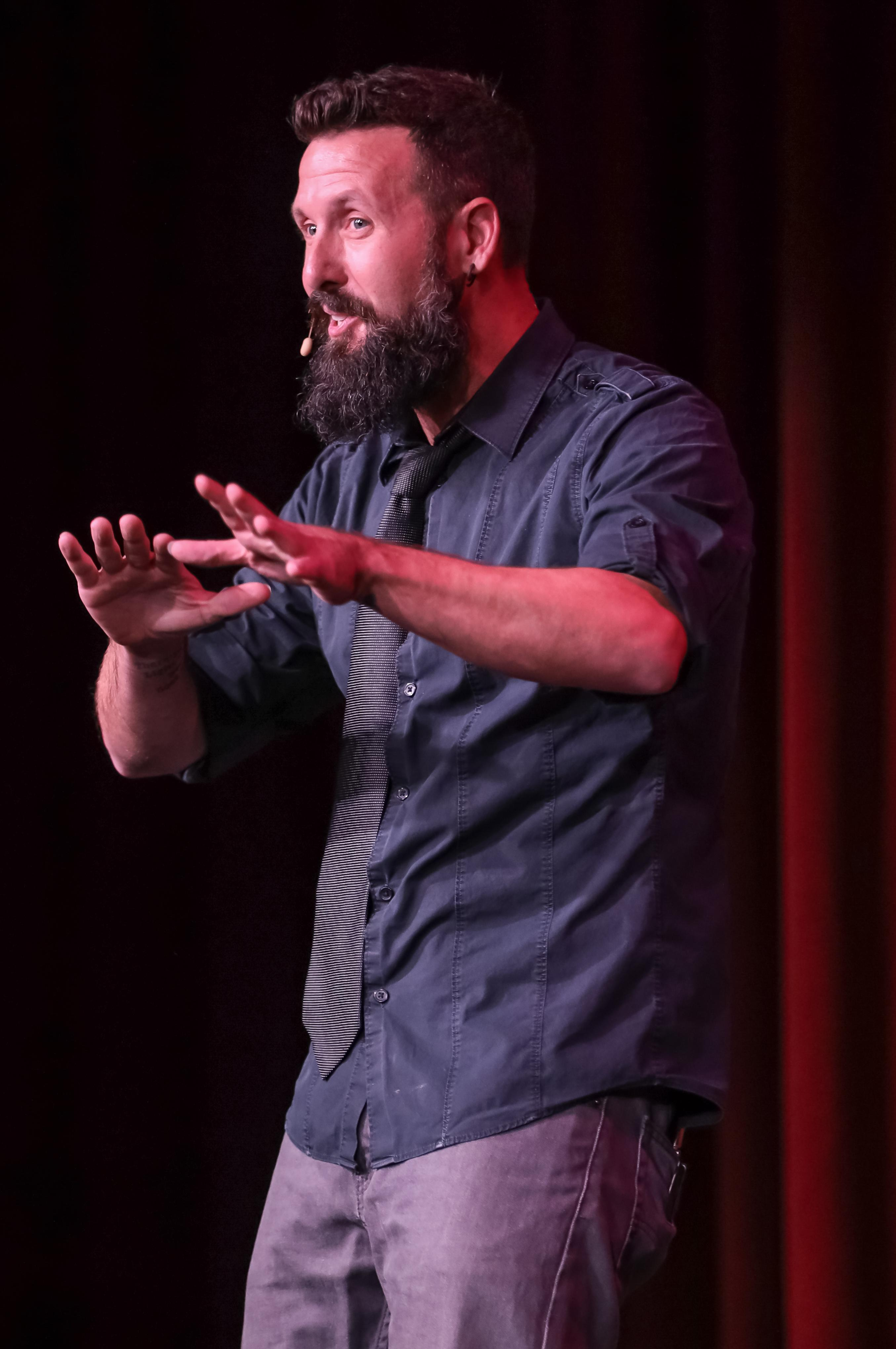
- Born: November 9, 1981 (age 44)
- Occupations: American entertainer, writer, comedian, and podcast host
- Known for: Guinness World Records; Matt Baker Comedy and Stunt Show; Moisture Festival Podcast; Odd and Offbeat Podcast; Museum of Curious Things

Matthew Baker (born November 9, 1981) is an American entertainer, writer, comedian, and podcast host. He has broken five Guinness World Records (three of which he still holds) for stunts primarily related to juggling. Baker was named one of the top five clean comedians in Seattle. He performs a comedy and stunt show at events around the world and is regular entertainer for Disney Cruise Lines and Royal Caribbean. He currently hosts two podcasts, the Moisture Festival Podcast and the Odd and Offbeat podcast, with co-host magician and comedian Louie Foxx.

He is currently based in the Pacific Northwest.

== Early career ==
Baker started his career at the age of seventeen, touring Ireland and the Czech Republic as part of an international footbag team. The tours were sponsored by Mars, Inc. as a marketing blitz aimed at creating buzz in the respective countries. Soon after Baker received a job touring the United States performing non-competitive games in a show called Creative Athletics. After touring the states for two years, Baker teamed up with fellow performer Alex Zerbe to create a comedy and juggling team called the Brothers From Different Mothers. The Brothers toured the United States performing at festivals, fairs, corporate events and theaters for eight years. They were finalists in the inaugural Laugh Across America Comedy Contest, were part of the Las Vegas Comedy Festival and did a short residence at the Comedy Barn in Pigeon Forge Tennessee. In 2009, Matt began a solo show called the Matt Baker Comedy + Stunt Show.

== Comedy and Stunt Show ==
In Baker’s Comedy + Stunt Show, he showcases a family friendly blend of stand up comedy and unusual skills. Baker has been performing this show for over a decade at a variety of events and locations around the world, including the Sonesta resort and Casino in St. Maarten, military bases in Europe as part of the Armed Forces Entertainment Tour, hundreds of Fortune 500 companies, colleges, and theaters. Baker has also performed his show as an opener for SNL comedians Jay Pharoah and Melissa Villaseñor.

== Guinness World Records ==
Baker currently holds three Guinness World Records. The records he holds are:

- Most Bowling Balls Caught on the forehead in 30 seconds
- Fastest Time for a pair to exchange costumes while juggling
- Most complete changeovers juggling three objects in one minute (leaping)

He appeared in the 2014, 2015 and 2017 Guinness World Record books.

== Podcast host ==
Baker hosts two podcasts, both are co-hosted with fellow comedian and magician Louie Foxx.

The Moisture Festival Podcast is a podcast that features long form interviews with the performers, volunteers and producers of the world's largest variety arts festival. Guests include:

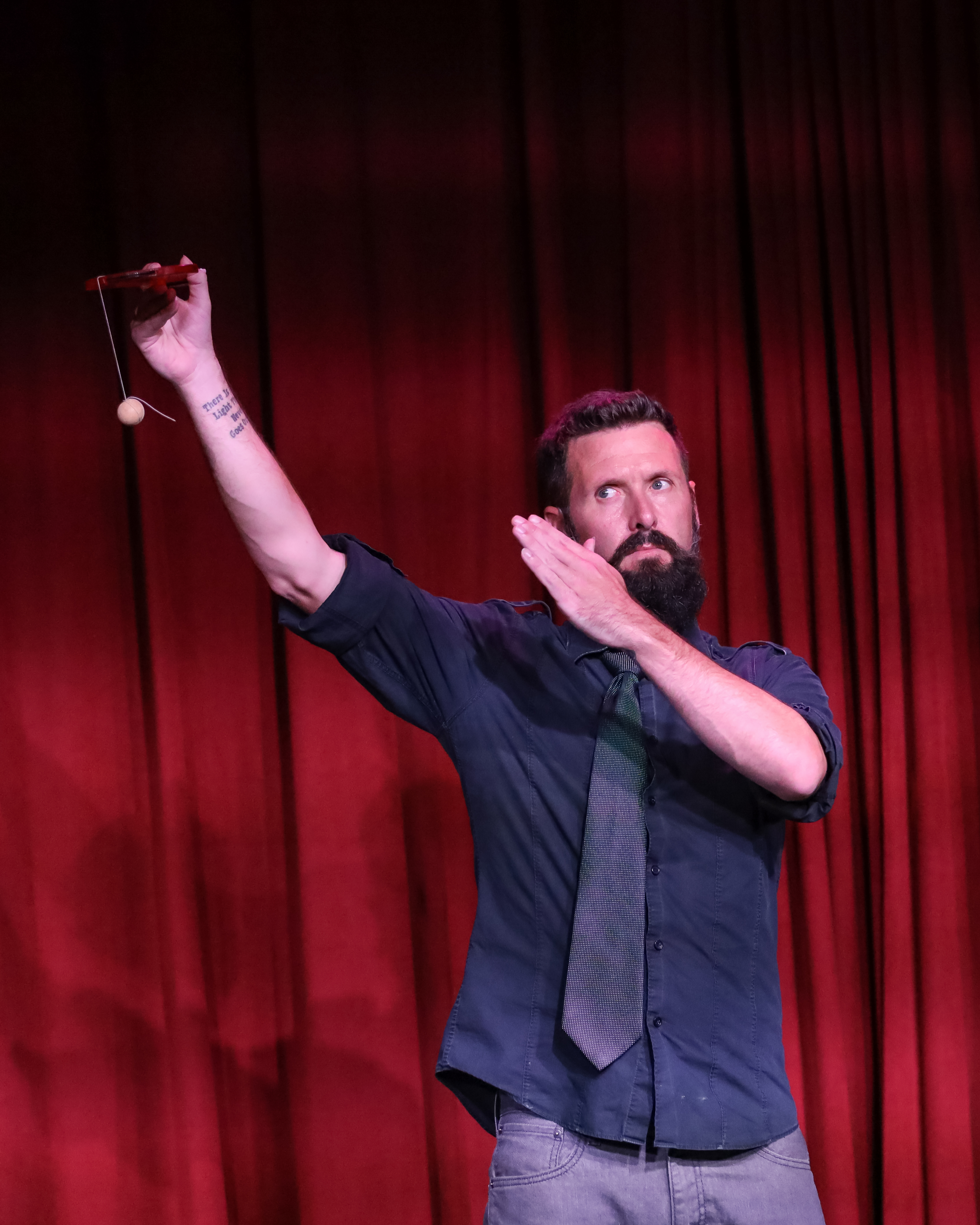
Matt Baker performing one of his unusual skills at Seattle’s Moisture Festival.

- Matt Stull (singer in Grammy Award-winning group The Bobs)
- Tom Noddy (Bubble Man)
- Bill Robison (comedian/clown)
- Paul Draper (magician and anthropologist)
- Jamy Ian Swiss (author and magician)
- Jay Alexander (magician and mentalist)
- Jeff Raz (Cirque Du Soleil clown)
- Mike Caveney (magician and author)
- Jim Page (folk musician)
- Rhys Thomas (juggler and comedian)

The other podcast is the Odd and Offbeat Podcast that has Baker and Foxx trading comic banter as they share weird stories that appear in the news. They occasionally will interview guests, including:

- Greg Bennick (lead singer of Trial and Director of Flight from Death)
- Kermet Apio (stand up comedian)
- Carisa Hendrix (magician and actor)
- Shawn Farquhar (magician)

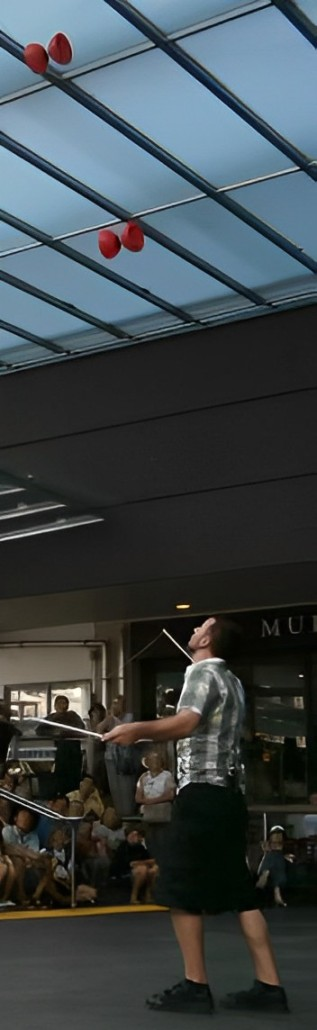
Matt Baker performing a high-flying stunt.

== TV/movie/podcast appearances ==
- Huckabee
- Late Late Show with James Corden
- America’s Got Talent Season 2 (commercial only)
- Evening Magazine
- Lo Show dei Record (Italy)
- TV Asahi (Japan)
- CCTV China (Twice)
- Tosh.0
- Last Comic Standing Season 7 (commercial only)
- Wait for the Dog (Short Film)
- Drop Everything Podcast
- Tailgate Entertainers
- County Fairgrounds
- Variety Arts Podcast

== Museum of Curious Things ==
As a side project, Baker started a mobile curiosity museum called the Museum of Curious Things. The museum originally was located in Seattle at the Georgetown Trailer Park Mall, but since has been moved and it travels to events all over the Pacific Northwest. The Museum is housed in a Airstream Trailer and is full of cultural artifacts, unusual taxidermy, crypto-zoological samples, anatomical oddities and historical mysteries.
