= Matej Andraž Vogrinčič =

Matej Andraz Vogrinčič (born October 12, 1970) is a Slovenian artist. He has been creating site-specific work in urban and natural environments since the early 1990s. He has built an international reputation by creating installations specific to local places, traditions, and histories – filling the most ordinary or neglected places with even more ordinary objects. With all his work, Vogrinčič starts with the space but always leaves room to alter and develop the idea in the process. His projects rely on a direct connection with the local community, including clothing and toy car donations.

Vogrinčič first “dressed” a dilapidated house with donated clothing in his hometown and then presented a similar project at the Venice Biennale in 1999. He created the project “Car Park: Members Only” – a wall installation consisting of 15,000 toy cars placed on a wall of a building in Adelaide, Australia, in response to the city’s traffic and parking problems and continued to the Australian outback, where he put up a watering can installation, consisting of some 2,000 plaster watering cans arranged over the area of a football field in a region largely devoid of rain. As part of the 2003 Awesome Festival in Perth, Western Australia, he filled up an area of 7,000 square meters with 10,000 balloons of red, orange, blue, pink, green and yellow colors. He filled the atrium of the former Melbourne GPO with 1000 umbrellas in 2005. One of his recent projects include Untitled (56 Boats) commissioned for the 4th Liverpool Biennial in England, an installation of 56 upturned boats placed inside the bombed ruins of the Gothic Era St. Luke’s Church. In 2013, Vogrinčič was selected to be part of 'KASHIMA' international artist-in-residence run by the npo BEPPU PROJECT in Beppu, Japan. During the residence he experimented a work in collaboration with Japanese bamboo craft masters and he created the site-specific artwork, 'Rope', in an abandoned hot-spring. He is invited as an artist for a contemporary art triennial called the Beppu Contemporary Art Festival 'Mixed Bathing World' 2015 in Beppu, Japan.

== Personal ==
Vogrinčič is born in Ljubljana, Slovenia

== Projects in Public Spaces ==
2013 , Beppu, Japan
Selected artist for 'KASHIMA' international artist-in-residence program

2007 Untitled (Shovels), Krasnoyarsk, Russia
Commissioned by the Biennial of Siberia

2007 Untitled (It used to be my playground) Farmington Canal New Haven, CT United States
Commissioned by Site Projects

2006 Untitled (56 Boats) St. Luke’s Church, Liverpool, United Kingdom
Commissioned by Liverpool Biennial

2005 When on a Winter’s Night a Traveller GPO Melbourne, Melbourne, Australia
Commissioned by L’Oréal Melbourne Fashion Festival and GPO

2004 Untitled (Enchanted Forest) Ljubljana, Slovenia
Commissioned by Microsoft

2003 Beach Balls Perth, Australia
Commissioned by the Awesome Festival

2002 Moon Plain Coober Pedy, Australia
Commissioned by South Australian Tourism Commission

2002 Port Christchurch, New Zealand
Commissioned by Scape: Arts & Industry Urban Arts Festival

2000 Car Park: Members Only Adelaide, Australia

1999 Casa Vestita (Dressed House) Venice, Italy

1997 Street Wear Ljubljana, Slovenia

1993 Dressed House Ljubljana, Slovenia

== Selected solo exhibitions ==
2003 Moon Plain, Museum of Modern Art, Ljubljana, Slovenia

2002 Moon Plain, SOFA Gallery, Christchurch, New Zealand

1999 Clothes Sculpture, John Gibson Gallery, New York, USA

1996 Dressing, Anonimus Gallery, Ljubljana, Slovenia

1992 Ready Made, SKUC Gallery, Ljubljana, Slovenia

== Selected group exhibitions ==
2005 Slovene Art 1995–2005: Territories, Identities, Nets, Museum of Modern Art, Ljubljana, Slovenia

The First Line, 26th Biennale of Graphic Arts, Ljubljana, Slovenia

2004 Slovene Art 1985–1995, Museum of Modern Art, Ljubljana, Slovenia

2002 Art+Industry Biennial, Christchurch, New Zealand

Tancat per Obres (Artists in Architecture) Collegi d’Arquitectes de Catalunya, Barcelona, Spain

1997 U3, Triennial of Slovene Contemporary Art, Museum of Modern Art, Ljubljana, Slovenia

This Art is Recycled, SKUC Gallery, Ljubljana, Slovenia

1996 Urbanaria, SCCA Ljubljana, Ljubljana, Slovenia

== Art interventions, performances, films, theatre design ==
1998 Le Coco Fruitwear Co, commissioned by Biennale of Young European and Mediterranean Artists, Turin, Italy

Activities of Le Coco Fruitwear Co. continue with new collections and new shows at:

K4 Club, Ljubljana, Slovenia

Kibla Club, Maribor, Slovenia

Institute of Contemporary Art, London

1998 Set designs for Marina Grzinic and Aina Šmid’s video Madame Butterfly Theater, Mladinsko, Ljubljana

1995 Le Coco fruitwear, a manufactory for fruit clothes, Ljubljana Markets, Slovenia

1994 The House, short film with Damjan Kozole, Ljubljana, Slovenia

1994 House Tailor, documentary film with Tibor Ogrizek, Ljubljana, Slovenia

1994 Paints garments and makes fashion accessories for Hej Salvador, a music-fashion performance (directed by Matjaž Pograjc, produced by Glej theatre), Ljubljana, Slovenia
