= Bowart =

Bowart is a surname. Notable people with the surname include:

- Walter Bowart (1939–2007), American journalist
- Wolfe Bowart (born 1962), American mime artist, son of Walter
