= Kim Carpenter =

Australian visual artist and theatre director

Kim David Carpenter AM is an Australian visual artist, theatre director, designer and devisor. For thirty years he was artistic director of his company, Kim Carpenter's Theatre of Image.

== Early life ==
Carpenter was born in Newcastle, New South Wales in 1950. He moved to Sydney as a teenager to train as a painter. He studied production at the National Institute of Dramatic Art in 1968 and 1969. He also studied at Motley Theatre Design Course in London in 1971.

== Biography ==
During the 1970s, Carpenter designed for the Melbourne Theatre Company and Sydney's Nimrod Theatre Company. He was, for a short period, co-Artistic Director of Nimrod along with John Bell and Neil Armfield in the early 1980s.

In 1988, Carpenter established Theatre of Image as Sydney's first visual theatre company. Theatre of Image has developed into a leading Australian theatre company for children and families, with its productions having a distinctive visual style. In September 2019 he announced the closure of the company.

His work includes The Book of Everything which he created with Neil Armfield for Theatre of Image and Belvoir. The production toured Australia and played a season in New York at the New Victory Theater.

In 2019 he adapted and designed The Happy Prince as a ballet for The Australian Ballet. It premiered at the Queensland Performing Arts Centre In February 2019

Carpenter was made a Member of the Order of Australia in 2013 for significant service to the performing arts.

Carpenter has devised, directed or designed over 100 productions for theatre, opera, dance, physical theatre, ballet and puppetry.

== Awards ==
Member The Order of Australia (AM)
Lifetime Achievement Award Australian Production Designers Guild
2 Helpmann Awards
3 Australian Writers' Guild Awards
4 Sydney Theatre Awards 2011, 2012
2 Green Room Awards
Centenary Medal Australia
Arts Hub Award

== Study Awards ==
Australian Artist-in-Residence Atelier Artistique International de Seguret, France
Australia Council Travel Grant New York to work with Robert Wilson
Loudon Sainthill Scholarship Europe
Churchill Fellowship (puppetry) to visit Japan, France, Holland & UK

== Independent Works ==
Year	Production	Role	Partnerships
1970	Death of a Salesman	Designer	The Old Tote Theatre Co, UNSW Drama Foundation
1970	The Breasts of Tiresias	Designer	University of Sydney, Footbridge Theatre
1970	This Story of Yours	Designer	The Old Tote Theatre Co, UNSW
1973	Lysistrata	Designer	The Old Tote Theatre Co, UNSW Drama Foundation
1973	The American Dream	Designer	Q Theatre Co
1974	Oh, What a Lovely War!	Designer	Rusden State College
1974	Time	Director	Rusden State College
1978	Bon-Bons and Roses for Dolly	Designer	Playbox
1983	Beyond Mozambique	Designer	Festival of Sydney
1983	Rapunzel in Suburbia	Adaptor, Director, Designer	Marionette Theatre
1985	The Little Mermaid (Boyd)	Director, Designer	The Australian Opera
1986	An Imaginary Life	Adaptor, Director, Designer	Belvoir
1986	Fantastic Toys	Designer	Australian Dance Theatre
1987	Away	Designer	State Theatre Co of SA
1988	A Moon Between Two Houses	Designer	Kite Theatre Co, QLD Tour
1988	Sun-Hunters	Director, Designer	Dancenorth, Festival of Sydney, Australian Bicentennial Authority
1988	The Pathfinder	Director	World Expo on Stage
1991	Earthly Paradise	Director, Designer	Malthouse
1995	Last Days Of A Famous Mime	Devisor, Director, Designer	SYDNEY STORIES Sydney Theatre Co, Sydney Festival
1996	Lift off Live	Designer	Australian Children's Television Foundation, Sydney Festival, national tour
2020	The Happy Prince Ballet	Adaptor, Designer	Queensland Symphony Orchestra, The Australian Ballet
2024	Incredibilia	Adaptor, Director, Designer	Riverside Theatres, State Library of NSW

== For The National Institute of Dramatic Art (NIDA) ==
Year	Production	Role	Partnerships
1968	Dark of the Moon	Designer	Jane Street Theatre
1968	Right You Are (If You Think So)	Stage Manager	University of NSW, Old Tote Theatre (1963-1969)
1968	The Matchmaker	Designer	The ABC Concert Department, Elizabethan Theatre Trust, UNSW
1969	Lock Up Your Daughters	Designer	
1969	Rooted	Designer	The Old Tote Theatre Co, UNSW Drama Foundation
1969	Spurt of Blood	Director	Jane Street Theatre
1969	The Rise and Fall of Boronia Avenue	Designer	The Old Tote Theatre Co, UNSW, UNSW Drama Foundation
1979	The Caucasian Chalk Circle	Designer	Jane Street Co, Sydney Theatre Co, Sydney Opera House Trust
1988	Veneer	Director	The Adelaide Festival of Arts
1988	Veneer 2	Director	

== For The Melbourne Theatre Company ==
Year	Production	Role	Partnerships
1972	Danton's Death	Designer	Elizabethan Theatre Trust, The University of Melbourne
1972	Father Dear, Come Over Here	Designer	Elizabethan Theatre Trust, The University of Melbourne
1972	The Chocolate Frog	Designer	Elizabethan Theatre Trust, The University of Melbourne
1972	The Old Familiar Juice	Designer	Elizabethan Theatre Trust, The University of Melbourne
1973	Jugglers Three	Designer	Canberra Melbourne & Sydney
1978	Just Between Ourselves	Designer	Melbourne
1978	Richard III	Designer	The University of Melbourne
1978	The Beaux' Stratagem	Designer	The University of Melbourne
1978	The Resistible Rise of Arturo Ui	Designer	The University of Melbourne
1982	Crimes of the Heart	Designer	The University of Melbourne
1983	Gulls	Designer	The University of Melbourne
1983	Slice	Devisor, Director, Designer	The University of Melbourne
1995	Blabbermouth	Designer	Arena Theatre Co
1993 & 1995	Two Weeks with the Queen	Designer	Sydney Theatre Co & tour

== For Nimrod Theatre ==
Year	Production	Role	Partnerships
1974	How Does Your Garden Grow?	Designer	
1975	You Want It Don't You Billy?	Designer	
1976	All Over	Designer	
1977	Much Ado About Nothing	Designer	
1977	Twelfth Night	Designer	
1979	On Our Selection	Designer	Festival of Sydney
1979	The Life of Galileo	Designer	
1980	The House of the Deaf Man	Designer	
1980	The Oresteia	Designer	
1980	Volpone	Designer	
1981	Three Sisters	Designer	
1984	Salonika	Designer	
1985	A Midsummer Night's Dream	Director, Designer	
1976 & 1977	Travesties	Designer	
1981 & 1983	Slice	Devisor, Director, Designer	Melbourne Theatre Co

== For Theatre of Image ==
Year	Production	Role	Partnerships
1988	The Sky Wizard	Devisor, Director, Designer	World Expo on Stage
1989	Colours of Desire	Devisor, Director, Designer	Art Gallery of NSW
1989	Hello	Devisor, Director, Designer	Sydney Theatre Co
1990	Swimming in Light... The world of Lloyd Rees	Devisor, Director, Designer	Melbourne Theatre Co, National Gallery of Australia, Caracas International Theatre Festival, Seymour Centre Sydney
1990	Wanted Pictures	Devisor, Director, Designer	Art Gallery of NSW, Sydney Biennale
1992	The Last Stop	Devisor, Director, Designer	Art Gallery of NSW
1994	Carnival of the Animals	Devisor, Director, Designer	Sydney Theatre Co
1994	White Heat	Devisor, Director, Designer	The Art Gallery of NSW
1995	Pierrot and Columbine	Adaptor, Director, Designer	Sydney Theatre Co
1997	Vivaldi's Ring Of Mystery	Devisor, Director, Designer	The Sydney Symphony Orchestra at Sydney Opera House
1999	Exotic Pleasures	Devisor, Director, Designer	Sydney
2000	Grandma's Shoes	Director, Designer	Opera Australia
2001	The Gypsy Boy	Devisor, Director, Designer	Sydney
2002	Mad Bad and Spooky	Director, Designer	Sydney Festival
2004	Tales from the Arabian Nights	Designer	Sydney and tour
2005	Stella and the Moon Man	Director, Designer	Australian Youth Orchestra, Sydney Theatre Co
2007	Lulie the Iceberg	Director, Designer	Kageboushi Theatre Company, Sydney Theatre Co
2008	Pixel and Friends ... the colour show	Devisor, Director, Designer	Powerhouse Museum
2011	Snow On Mars	Creator, Designer	Sydney Festival
2019	Brett & Wendy... A Love Story Bound by Art	Creator, Director, Designer, Writer	Riverside Theatres, Sydney Festival
1991 & 1999	Hansel and Gretel...a tale of our times	Director, Designer	Belvoir & Sydney Theatre Co
1992, 1993, 2003, 2008	The Happy Prince	Director, Designer	Sydney Theatre Company, Manitoba Theatre for Young People, Seymour Centre, Sydney Festival, Awesome Festival, Arts Centre Melbourne, National Tours
1997, 1998, 2001	Jake And Pete...A Roadstory For Cats		Sydney and tour
2002 & 2003	Robinson Crusoe	Adaptor, Director, Designer	Sydney Theatre Co, Windmill Performing Arts & tour
2005 & 2006	Go Pinocchio!	Director, Designer	Sydney & Regional Tour
2010 & 2015	Little Beauty	Devisor, Director, Designer	National Portrait Gallery
2011 & 2013	The Book of Everything	Designer	The New Victory, Melbourne Theatre Company, Belvoir
2014 & 2015	Monkey...Journey To The West	Creator, Designer	Australian International Arts Festivals - tour

== International Tours ==
Year	Production	Role	Partnerships
1973	Dido & Aeneas / Edward John Eyre	Designer	UNSW Opera, London & Aberdeen
1990	Swimming in Light... The world of Lloyd Rees	Devisor, Director, Designer	Caracas Theatre Festival Venezuela
1992	Hansel and Gretel...a tale of our times	Director, Designer	Aotea Centre New Zealand
1995	Two Weeks with the Queen	Designer	Sydney Theatre Co, Johannesburg
2001	Jake And Pete...A Roadstory For Cats	Director, Designer	Manitoba Theatre for Young People
2002	The Happy Prince	Director, Writer	Manitoba Theatre for Young People
2012	The Book of Everything	Designer	New Victory Theater New York City

== Solo Exhibitions ==
2024	A Midsummer Night's Dream Maunsell Wickes Gallery Sydney
2022	WILDE: Life and Fantasy Maunsell Wickes Gallery Sydney
2020	The Happy Prince ARO Gallery Sydney
2015	Art For The Theatre The Depot Gallery Danks St Sydney
2007	Page to Stage Lulie The Iceberg Japan Foundation Gallery
2004	Pixel & Friends Powerhouse Museum
	Two exhibitions Holdsworth Galleries, Sydney

== Group Exhibitions ==
Wright Hephurn Gallery London
Quadrennial (2) Prague
Theatre Designs S. H. Ervin Gallery Sydney
British & Australian Theatre Design Adelaide Festival, National Tour, UK Tour
Australian Centenary of Federation designs for The Future Powerhouse Museum, Sydney permanent collection
Australian Curated Exhibit A.A. Bakhrushin Central State Theatre Museum, Moscow
Australian Designers Association Productions Sydney Opera House
