= Jacek Koman =

Polish actor and singer

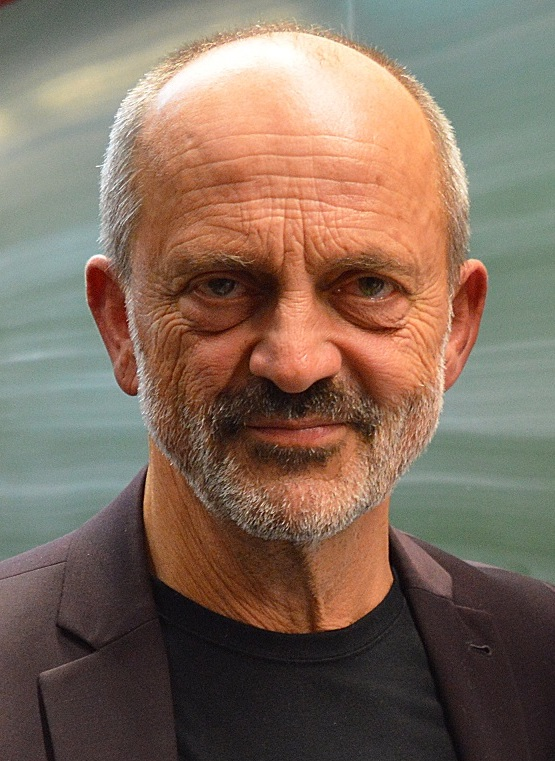
- Koman in 2019
- Born: Bielsko-Biała, Poland
- Education: National Film School in Łódź
- Occupations: Actor, singer
- Years active: 1978–present
- Partner: Catherine McClements
- Children: 2

Jacek Koman is a Polish actor and singer.

== Early life and education ==
Koman was born in Bielsko-Biała, Poland, to actors Halina Koman (née Dobrowolska; born 3 January 1923) and Adam Koman (24 December 1922 – 1 December 2005).

Koman attended the National Film School in Łódź, where he studied acting alongside Małgorzata Potocka, Andrzej Szczytko and Piotr Skiba (1974–78).

He moved to Australia in 1982 with his brother Tomek. They landed in Perth, Western Australia, before heading over to Melbourne, Victoria, where he began acting again.

== Career ==
=== Acting ===
Koman's first professional stage appearance was as Lysander in a production of A Midsummer Night's Dream in Bielsko-Biała in 1978.

In Australia, he has worked with partner Catherine McClements a number of times, including on films Redheads and Floodhouse; an episode of Rush in 2009; and in theatre productions Angels in America (1994), The Blind Giant Is Dancing (1995), Macbeth (2003), and Cruel and Tender (2005).

In 2011, Koman was nominated for an AACTA award for his guest performance in Spirited. In 2012, he appeared as 'The Great Hypno' in the Australian television series Miss Fisher's Murder Mysteries.

In 2013, he returned to the stage after an eight-year absence, in Tom Holloway's translation of Durrenmatt's Dance of Death at the Malthouse Theatre in Melbourne.

In 2021 he played Remy, a minor character in the third season of the Australian black-comedy Mr Inbetween.

In 2024 Koman was announced as part of the cast for Disney Plus series Last Days of the Space Age In the 2024 film Conclave, Koman appears as Archbishop Woźniak, the Prefect of the Papal Household and the late pope's confidant.

=== Music ===
Koman is also the lead singer of VulgarGrad, a Melbourne band who play Russian-style music, formed in 2004.

== Personal life ==
Koman met his partner, Australian actress Catherine McClements, in the late 1980s at the Anthill Theatre in Melbourne. They have two children together.

== Filmography ==
=== Film ===
Year	Title	Role	Notes	Ref
2024	Conclave	Archbishop Woźniak		
2023	Soulcatcher	Minister Jan Zaremba		
2023	Tonight You're Sleeping With Me	Nina's Father		
2022	Talk to Me	Burke Spirit		
2022	Niebezpieczni dżentelmeni	Vladimir Lenin		
2022	Wiarolom	Francisz		
2020	The Hater	Robert Karsucki		
2019	Icarus. The Legend of Mietek Kosz	Stanislaw Kosz		
2019	Judy and Punch	Singer		
2018	Krew Boga	Geowold		
2017	Breath	Karl Loon		
2017	Jungle	Moni Ghinsberg		
2016	The Death and Life of Otto Bloom	Miroslaw Kotok		
2015	Sucker	Riley		
2015	Disco Polo	Katiusza		
2015	Ziarno Prawdy	Monk		
2014	Son of a Gun	Sam Lennox		
2013	The Great Gatsby	Uncredited		
2013	Shopping	Benny		
2011	Ghost Rider: Spirit of Vengeance	Terrokov		
2011	The Hunter	Middleman		
2010	Kołysanka	Postman		
2009	Kochaj i tancz	Jan Kettler		
2008	Defiance	Konstanty 'Kościk' Kozłowski		
2008	Australia	Ivan		
2008	The Funk	Narrator	Short film	
2007	Romulus, My Father	Vacek		
2006	Children of Men	Tomasz		
2004	Floodhouse	Anselm	Short film	
2003	Horseplay	Roman		
2001	Moulin Rouge!	The Unconscious Argentinean (Note: This character is often referred to as The Narcoleptic Argentinean, as he does not spend his entire time on screen unconscious. However, the film and its credits refer to this character as The Unconscious Argentinean.)		
1999	117	Man	Short film	
1998	The Sound of One Hand Clapping	Picotti		
1997	The Wedding Party	Raoul		
1996	What I Have Written	Jeremy Fliszar		
1994	Paperback Romance (aka Lucky Break)	Det Yuri Borodinoff		
1992	Redheads	Lawyer		
1991	Holidays on the River Yarra	Mercenary		
1990	Hunting	Bergman's Butler		

=== Television ===
Year	Title	Role	Notes	Ref
2024	Last Days of the Space Age	Yvgeny	8 episodes	
2024	Prosper	Eli Slowik	8 episodes	
2023	Faraway Downs	Ivan	6 episodes	
2023	The Teacher	Bogdan Zawadzki 'Captain'	5 episodes	
2023	Szum. Kryminal analogowy	Leader	6 episodes (podcast series)	
2021	Receptura	Jan Wedel	6 episodes	
2021	Ms Fisher's Modern Murder Mysteries	Alexander Kowalski	2 episodes	
2021	Mr Inbetween	Remy	1 episode	
2016-21	Jack Irish	Orton	13 episodes	
2018-21	The Defence	Harry McVay	14 episodes	
2020	The Woods	Dawid	4 episodes	
2020	Maly zgon	Stanislaw	9 episodes	
2017-20	Mustangs FC	Danny	37 episodes	
2019	Reef Break	General Kivani	1 episode	
2019	Ojciec Mateusz	Eryk Was	1 episode	
2018	Tidelands	Gregori Stolin	6 episodes	
2018	Wanted	Leon	1 episode	
2018	Rake	Jakub	8 episodes	
2018	Wrong Kind of Black	Rudi	4 episodes	
2016-17	Doctor Doctor	Trevor	4 episodes	
2017	The Warriors	Fast Freddy	3 episodes	
2017	Seven Types of Ambiguity	Gideon	1 episode	
2017	Oddlands	Animal	TV movie	
2015	Prokurator	Kazimierz Proch	10 episodes	
2012-14	Lekarze	Leon	60 episodes	
2014	Wataha	Robert Korda	3 episodes	
2013	Television Theater	Mr Philips	1 episode	
2013	The Doctor Blake Mysteries	Miroslav Gorski	1 episode	
2013	Top of the Lake	Wolfgang Zanic	2 episodes	
2012	Hotel 52	Wiktor Prus	10 episodes	
2012	Miss Fisher's Murder Mysteries	Mr Merton	1 episode	
2011	Spirited	Potter	4 episodes	
2011	East West 101	Roman	2 episodes	
2011	Small Time Gangster	Artie	2 episodes	
2010	Ratownicy	Piotr	12 episodes	
2010	City Homicide	Andro	1 episode	
2010	Usta Usta	Pawel	1 episode	
2009	Rush	Anton	1 episode	
2008	Waking the Dead	Jovan	2 episodes	
2005-07	The Incredible Journey of Mary Bryant	Wanjon	2 episodes	
2006	Tsunami: The Aftermath	Peer	2 episodes	
2006	Tripping Over	Magnus	6 episodes	
2006	HG Wells' War With the World	Maxim Gorky	TV movie	
2005	Life	Franco	TV movie	
2003	MDA	Dr Mikhail Varonio	1 episode	
2003	Stingers	Daniel Tedesco	1 episode	
2002	The Secret Life of Us	Dominic	14 episodes	
1998	Search for Treasure Island	Don Grego	4 episodes	
1998	Wildside	Barry	1 episode	
1997	Simone de Beauvoir’s Babies	Ryko	4 episodes	
1996	Twisted Tales	Taxi Driver	1 episode	
1993	Snowy	Jenda	1 episode	
1993	Phoenix	Steward	1 episode	
1989	Darlings of the Gods	Company Member	TV movie	
1988	The Four Minute Mile	Emil Zátopek	TV movie	
1979	Bezposrednie polaczenie	Slawek	TV movie	

== Stage credits ==
Year	Title	Role	Venue / Co.
2021	Death of a Salesman	Willy Loman	Roslyn Packer Theatre with STC
2013	The Dance of Death	Edgar	Malthouse Theatre, Melbourne
2005	Cruel and Tender	The General	Belvoir Street Theatre, Sydney
2004	A Midsummer Night's Dream	Nick Bottom	Belvoir Street Theatre, Sydney
2003	Endgame	Hamm	Wharf Theatre with STC for Sydney Festival
2003	Macbeth	Macbeth	Belvoir Street Theatre, Sydney
2001	Emma's Nose	Wilhelm Fliess	Belvoir Street Theatre, Sydney
2000	The Marriage of Figaro	Figaro	Belvoir Street Theatre, Sydney
1999	As You Like It	Jacques	Belvoir Street Theatre, Sydney
1999	Waiting for Godot		Russell Street Theatre with MTC
1998	The Caucasian Chalk Circle	Azdac	Belvoir Street Theatre, Sydney
1997	Tartuffe	Tartuffe	Drama Theatre, Sydney with STC
1995	The Tempest	Trinculo	Belvoir Street Theatre, Sydney, with Company B, The Space, Adelaide
1995	Picasso at the Lapin Agile	Pablo Picasso	Belvoir Street Theatre, Sydney, Directed by Neil Armfield
1995	The Blind Giant Is Dancing	Ramon Gris	Belvoir Street Theatre, Sydney
1995	Hamlet	Claudius	Belvoir Street Theatre, Sydney, Playhouse, Melbourne
1995	The Splendids	Jean	Belvoir Street Theatre, Sydney, with Company B
1994	Angels in America	Roy Cohn	Playhouse, Melbourne
1994	Blue Murder	Blue	Belvoir Street Theatre, Sydney
1993	Faust	Faust	MTC
1993	The Master and Margarita	The Master	Five Dollar Theatre Company
1992	Gulliver’s Travels	The General	Playhouse, Melbourne, Ford Theatre, Geelong with MTC & Handspan Theatre
1991	Endgame		Anthill Theatre for Melbourne International Comedy Festival
1991	The Taming of the Shrew		Playhouse, Melbourne with MTC
1991	The Marriage of Figaro	Figaro	Playhouse, Melbourne, with MTC & Australian Nouveau Theatre
1991	The Woman in the Dunes		La Mama
1990	The Emigrants		Anthill Theatre, Melbourne
1990	Waiting for Godot		Russell Street Theatre, Melbourne, with Australian Nouveau Theatre & MTC
1990	Nothing Sacred	Sitnikov	Playhouse, Melbourne with MTC
1990	Peer Gynt		Universal Theatre, Melbourne, with Australian Nouveau Theatre
1989–90	The Imaginary Invalid	Cleante	Universal Theatre, Melbourne, Armoury Lawns, Adelaide with Anthill Theatre & New Fortune Theatre
1989	The Maids	Claire	Anthill Theatre, Melbourne
1988	Princess Ivona		Perth Festival
1988	Moliere (aka The Cabal of Hypocrites)	Prompter / Just Shoemaker	Key Studios, Melbourne with Australian Nouveau Theatre
1988	Somewhere in Here are Henry and Louisa		Organ Factory, Melbourne with La Mama
1987	The Emigrants		The New Dolphin Theatre for Perth Fringe Festival
1987	The Hope	Boss	Arts Centre Melbourne, Playhouse, Perth & Perth regional tour with Western Australian Theatre Company & Playbox Theatre Company
1978	A Midsummer Night’s Dream	Lysander	Bielsko-Biała, Poland
