= Rhys Thomas (juggler) =

American entertainer

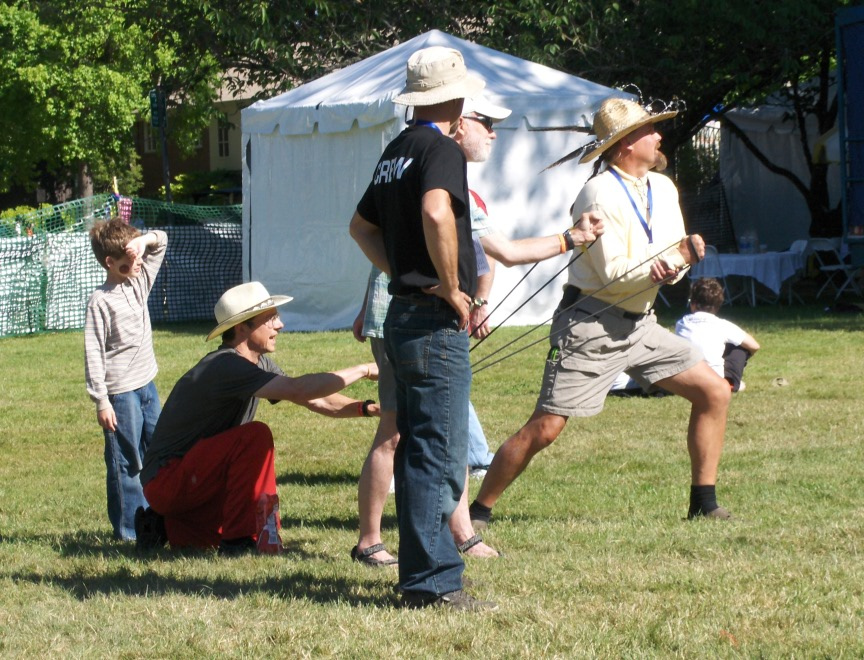
Rhys Thomas (sitting) in Corvallis

Rhys Thomas, born 1963 is a juggler, comedian and entertainer in the Pacific Northwest of the United States. He has been performing publicly since 1987. His performance style is one characterized by jokes and puns accompanied by visual tricks and stunts. He performs at schools, churches, libraries and pirate festivals.

Rhys grew up in Crow, Oregon. He taught himself to walk on a cable strung between two trees above a pond.

As a juggler, Rhys has appeared in the European Juggling Competition in Denmark, twice at the World Cup Street Performer Competition in Japan and as an artist-in-residence at the Smithsonian Institution. He has also appeared as far afield as the island of Tobago and unicycled on a frozen sea near the Bering Strait.

Rhys also helped found the Portland Juggling Festival, and has appeared in many of its juggling and vaudeville extravaganzas. His official website. 1994 Ben Linder Memorial Award was given to Rhys Thomas.

Rhys' wife, Maria, and daughters Isabel and Matilda.
