= Catherine McClements =

Australian actress

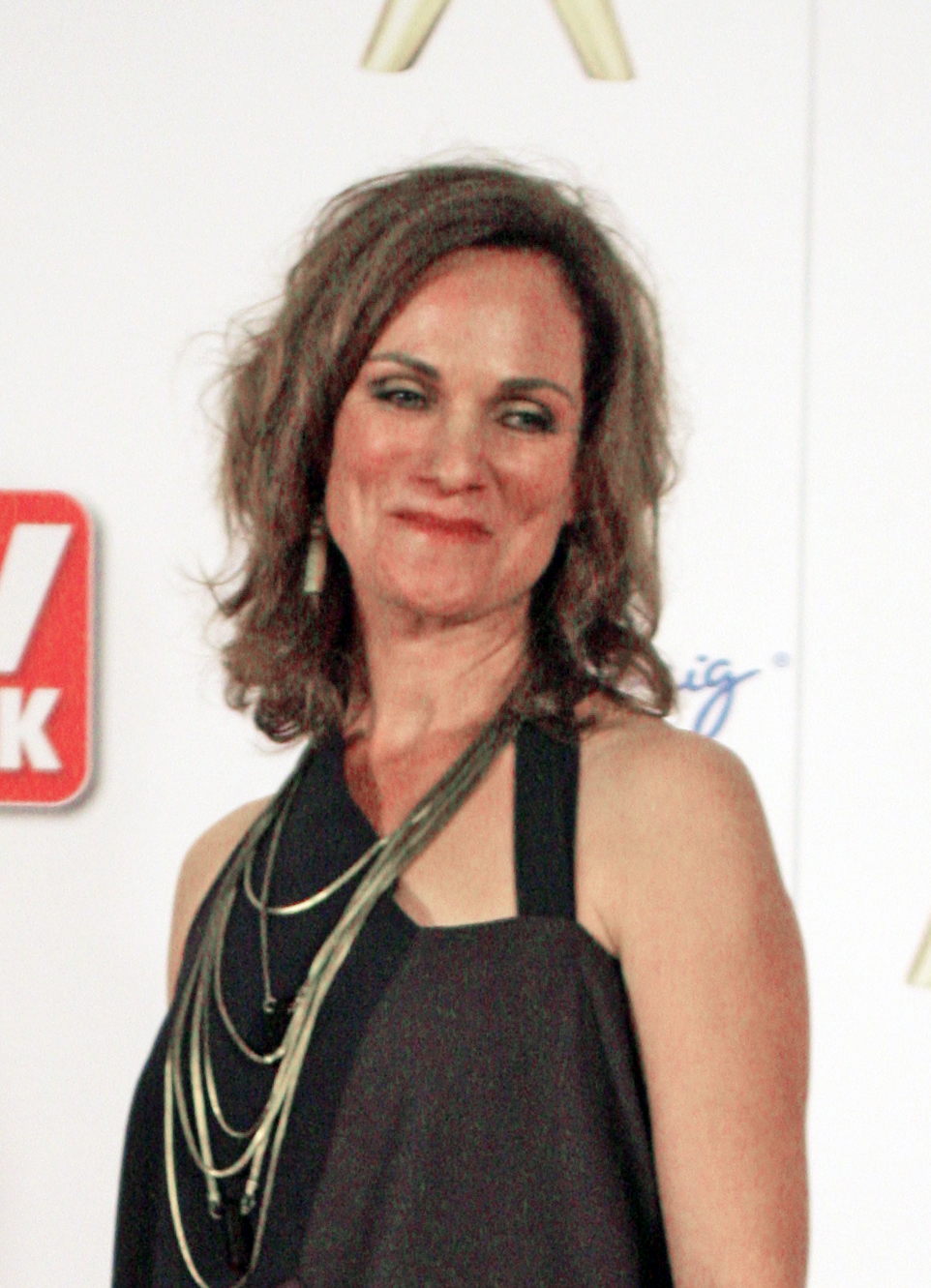
- McClements at the 2011 Logie Awards
- Education: National Institute of Dramatic Art (BFA)
- Occupation: Actress
- Years active: 1984–present
- Known for: Rachel Goldstein in Water Rats; Kerry Vincent in Rush; Christine Williams in Tangle
- Spouse: Jacek Koman (c. 1990–present)
- Children: 2

Catherine McClements is an Australian stage, film, and television actress, and television presenter. She is known for her TV roles in Water Rats and Tangle, for which she won Logie Awards, and has performed in stage productions for theatre companies such as Belvoir St Theatre, the Melbourne Theatre Company, the Sydney Theatre Company and the State Theatre Company of South Australia.

== Early life and education ==
Catherine McClements is the daughter of Frank, a high school principal, and Pamela.

She attended the National Institute of Dramatic Art (NIDA), graduating in 1985, alongside Baz Luhrmann, Sonia Todd, and Justin Monjo. In 1988, McClements, along with a number of other people including Baz Luhrmann, set up an experimental theatre ensemble called Six Years Old and worked on expanding the play Strictly Ballroom, which was first produced in their second year of NIDA in 1984.

== Career ==
=== Screen ===
In 1993, McClements had a role in The Girl from Tomorrow Part II: Tomorrow's End. She is best known, however, for her starring role as Rachel Goldstein in the Australian police drama Water Rats from 1996 to 1999. She followed this up with a recurring guest role on The Secret Life of Us in 2001, for which she won the AFI Award for Best Actress in a Guest Role in a Television Drama.

She starred as Rosie in the 2003 drama series CrashBurn and appeared in the Network Ten telemovie Mary Bryant in 2005.

From 2008 she played Inspector/Superintendent Kerry Vincent in the Australian police drama Rush, and psychologist Christine Williams in the Showcase drama Tangle. A second and third season of Tangle and Rush respectively were announced in 2009 and both aired in 2010. Tangle and Rush were commissioned for new seasons, both to start filming in mid-2011. In 2010, McClements won an AFI Award for her role in Tangle. She has also won ASTRA Awards for her role in Tangle in 2011 and 2013.

In 2011, McClements guest starred in a YouTube and Facebook-only show called Queer as F**k, playing Mel, a friend of main character Aaron (Gary Abrahams).

In 2012, McClements was cast as Meg Jackson in Wentworth, a contemporary reimagining of the Australian classic Prisoner. She was cast in a leading role for Season One of Wentworth, but her character did not appear beyond episode one.

Earlier in 2013, McClements was cast in new ABC telemovie The Broken Shore, alongside Don Hany, Dan Wyllie and Claudia Karvan. It premiered at the Adelaide Film Festival in October 2013 and aired on the ABC in early 2014.

In September 2013, McClements was cast in the film The Menkoff Method, directed by David Parker.

In 2019 she starred in Ms Fisher's Modern Murder Mysteries as Birdie Birnside.

In August 2022 she played the part of a teacher in the State Theatre Company South Australia and Sydney Theatre Company co-production Chalkface, written by Angela Betzien. The play opened at the Dunstan Playhouse in Adelaide.

In 2023, McClements was announced as part of the cast for SBS series Erotic Stories. She was also announced as part of the cast of the third and final season of ABC drama Total Control, as well as ABC drama Return to Paradise. On 21 November 2024, it was announced that McClements was a part of the cast for ABC drama The Family Next Door. McClements was also named for Netflix series Apple Cider Vinegar. On 31 January 2025, McClements was announced as part of the cast for the Netflix series The Survivors. On 17 April 2025, McClements would return for the second series of Return to Paradise as the show would enter production again.

On 23 April 2026. McClements was announced as part of the extended cast for Paramount+ series Dalliance. On 22 June 2026, McClements was nominated for a Logie Award for her work in The Survivors.

=== Stage ===
McClements has also appeared in stage productions for many theatre companies, including Belvoir St Theatre, the Melbourne Theatre Company, the Sydney Theatre Company, Bell Shakespeare, State Theatre Company of South Australia, and the Malthouse Theatre.

In 2013, McClements returned to the stage in Sharr White's play The Other Place for Melbourne Theatre Company and Phèdre for Bell Shakespeare.

== Personal life ==
McClements' partner is actor Jacek Koman, who also guest-starred in The Secret Life of Us as Dominic, though they were not on the show at the same time. They have two children.

McClements' brother is Brendan McClements, who, as of 2013, was the CEO of Victorian Major Events Company. He is 18 months older than her and her "best friend growing up".

McClements is good friends with fellow actress Claudia Karvan, whom she met at the AFI Awards in 1990 and starred with in the film Redheads in 1992.

== Awards ==
| Year | Award | Category | Title | Result |
|---|---|---|---|---|
| 1990 | AFI Award | Best Actress in a Lead Role | Weekend with Kate | Won |
| 1993 | Asia-Pacific Film Festival | Best Supporting Actress | Redheads | Won |
| 1994 | Green Room Award | Best Female Actor in a Play | Angels in America | Nominated |
| 1998 | Logie Award | Most Popular Actress | Water Rats | Nominated |
| 1998 | Logie Award | Most Outstanding Actress | Water Rats | Won |
| 1998 | People's Choice Award | Favourite Actress in a Drama or Serial | Water Rats | Nominated |
| 1999 | AFI Award | Best Actress in a Lead Role | Water Rats (episode 4.17: I'm Home) | Nominated |
| 2000 | Logie Award | Most Outstanding Actress | Water Rats | Nominated |
| 2001 | AFI Award | Best Actress in a Guest Role in a Television Series | The Secret Life of Us | Won |
| 2007 | AFI Award | Best Lead Actress in a Television Drama | Call Me Mum | Nominated |
| 2008 | Helpmann Award | Best Female Actor in a Play | Who's Afraid of Virginia Woolf? | Nominated |
| 2010 | Astra Award | Most Outstanding Performance by a Female Actor | Tangle | Nominated |
| 2010 | AFI Award | Best Lead Actress in a Television Drama | Tangle | Won |
| 2011 | Astra Award | Most Outstanding Performance by a Female Actor | Tangle | Won |
| 2011 | Logie Award | Most Outstanding Actress | Rush | Nominated |
| 2013 | Logie Award | Most Outstanding Actress | Tangle | Nominated |
| 2013 | ASTRA Award | Most Outstanding Performance by a Female Actor | Tangle | Won |
| 2026 | Logie Awards | Best Support Actress in a Drama | The Survivors | Pending |

== Filmography ==
=== Film ===
| Year | Title | Role | Notes |
|---|---|---|---|
| 1986 | Just Us | Jessica Taylor | Telemovie |
| 1987 | The Right Hand Man | Sarah Redbridge | Feature film |
| 1990 | Struck by Lightning | Jill McHugh | Feature film |
| 1990 | Weekend with Kate | Kate Muir | Feature film |
| 1992 | Redheads | Diana Ferraro | Feature film (aka Desperate Prey) |
| 2000 | Waiting at the Royal | Dinny Weston | Telemovie |
| 2000 | Better Than Sex | Sam | Feature film |
| 2003 | After the Deluge | Nikki Kirby | Telemovie |
| 2003 | Floodhouse | Ava | 50 minute film |
| 2005 | Mary Bryant | Marleen | Telemovie |
| 2006 | Call Me Mum | Kate | Telemovie |
| 2006 | Sexy Thing | Mum | Short film |
| 2007 | Fast Lane | Louise | Short film |
| 2008 | Emerald Falls | Rosalie Bailey | Feature film |
| 2013 | The Broken Shore | Erica Burgouyne | Telemovie |
| 2014 | The Menkoff Method | Majorie | Feature film |

=== Television ===
| Year | Title | Role | Notes |
|---|---|---|---|
| 1986 | My Brother Tom | Margaret 'Peggy' McGibbon | Miniseries |
| 1993 | The Girl from Tomorrow: Tomorrow's End | Lorien | Miniseries |
| 1993 | G.P. | Heather Ryan | TV series, 1 episode: "Close Encounters" |
| 1996–99 | Water Rats | Rachel Goldstein | TV series, 109 episodes |
| 2001–02 | The Secret Life of Us | Carmen | TV series, 10 episodes. Won AFI award for episode: "Love Sucks" |
| 2003 | CrashBurn | Rosie Denton Harfield | TV series |
| 2006 | Real Stories | Jillian | TV series, episode 8 |
| 2008–11 | Rush | Kerry Vincent | TV series, all 70 episodes |
| 2009–12 | Tangle | Christine Williams | Foxtel series |
| 2010 | The Pacific | Catherine Leckie | TV series, 1 episode: "Home" |
| 2013 | Wentworth | Meg Jackson | Foxtel series, 4 episodes |
| 2014 | The Time of Our Lives | Diana Southey | TV series, season 2 |
| 2015 | The Beautiful Lie | Tess du Pont | TV series |
| 2016 | Rake | Julie | TV series, season 4 |
| 2017 | Sisters | Genevieve | TV series, 7 episodes |
| 2019 | Ms Fisher's Modern Murder Mysteries | Birdie Birnside | TV series |
| 2022 | Pieces of Her | Grace Juno | Netflix series, 6 episodes |
| 2023 | The Lost Flowers of Alice Hart | Sarah | TV miniseries, 2 episodes |
| 2023 | Erotic Stories | Sam | Anthology TV series, 1 episode: "Philia" |
| 2024 | Total Control | Marion Beaumont | TV series, season 3, 4 episodes |
| 2024–present | Return to Paradise | Senior Sergeant Philomena Strong | TV series, 18 episodes |
| 2024 | Bump | Gaby | TV series: 1 episode |
| 2025 | Apple Cider Vinegar | Julie Gibbs | TV series: 5 episodes |
| 2025 | The Survivors | Trish Birch | TV series: 5 episodes |
| 2025 | The Family Next Door | Barbara | TV series: 6 episodes |
| 2026 | Dalliance | Sarah | TV series |

=== Other appearances ===
| Year | Title | Role | Notes |
|---|---|---|---|
| 1999 | Doing Time | Narrator | 10-part TV documentary |
| 2009 | Whale Patrol | Narrator | TV documentary |
| 2011 | Things on Sunday: Sex | Panel member | Malthouse Theatre |
| 2015 | Sperm Donors Anonymous | Narrator | TV documentary |

== Theatre work ==
McClements' work on stage includes:

| Name | Year | Character | Venue |
|---|---|---|---|
| 1984 | Holiday Makers | Sasha | NIDA |
| 1984 | Impromptu at Versai (part of Three French Farces) | Mrs Molière | NIDA |
| 1984 | All's Well That Ends Well | Helena | NIDA |
| 1984; 1986 | Strictly Ballroom | Barbara Pierce | NIDA, Bratislava |
| 1985 | Dreamplay | | NIDA |
| 1985 | The Unseen Hand (part of Hallucinogenics? 3 plays from the 60s) | | NIDA |
| 1985 | The War (from The Greeks trilogy) | Iphigenia | NIDA & St Martins Youth Arts Centre |
| 1985 | Once in a Lifetime | | NIDA |
| 1986 | And a Nightingale Sang | Joyce | Sydney Opera House with Gary Penny Productions |
| 1987 | Much Ado About Nothing | Hero | Playhouse, Adelaide with STCSA |
| 1987 | Shepherd on the Rocks | Rhonda Moffat / News team member / Female whale saver | Playhouse, Adelaide with STCSA |
| 1987 | The Winter's Tale | Perdita; Servant | Playhouse, Adelaide with STCSA |
| 1987 | Les Liaisons dangereuses | Cecile de Volanges | Playhouse, Adelaide with STCSA |
| 1987 | Away | Meg | Playhouse, Adelaide with STCSA |
| 1988 | Molière (aka The Cabal of Hypocrites) | Armando | Key Studios, Melbourne with Australian Nouveau Theatre for Spoleto Melbourne Festival of the Arts |
| 1989; 1990 | The Imaginary Invalid | Angelique | New Fortune Theatre for Perth Festival, Anthill Theatre, Melbourne, Universal Theatre, Melbourne, Armoury Lawns for Adelaide Festival with Australian Nouveau Theatre |
| 1990 | Crystal Clear | Thomasina | Universal Theatre |
| 1991 | The Crucible | Abigail Williams | Sydney Opera House with STC |
| 1993; 1994 | Angels in America | Harper Amity Pitt | Russell Street Theatre, Melbourne & Playhouse, Melbourne with MTC, Playhouse, Adelaide with STCSA |
| 1994 | Seeing Violet (part of Unsettled trilogy) | Isabel Hope | Napier Street Theatre, Melbourne with $5 Theatre Company |
| 1994 | No Family (part of Unsettled trilogy) | Doris | Napier Street Theatre, Melbourne with $5 Theatre Company |
| 1994 | At Dusk (part of Unsettled trilogy) | Lily | Napier Street Theatre, Melbourne with $5 Theatre Company |
| 1995 | The Blind Giant Is Dancing | Louise | Belvoir St Theatre, Sydney |
| 2000 | Suddenly Last Summer | Catharine | Belvoir St Theatre, Sydney |
| 2000 | Emma Celebrazione! | | Gasworks Arts Park, Melbourne |
| 2003 | Macbeth | Lady Macbeth | Belvoir St Theatre, Sydney |
| 2005 | Cruel and Tender | Amelia | Fairfax Studio, Melbourne with MTC |
| 2006 | It Just Stopped | Beth | Malthouse Theatre & Belvoir St Theatre, Sydney |
| 2007 | Who's Afraid of Virginia Woolf? | Martha | Belvoir St Theatre, Sydney |
| 2008 | Appetite | Louise | Dunstan Playhouse, Adelaide, Sydney Opera House, Fairfax Studio, Melbourne |
| 2011 | Happy Ending (part of the Cybec Readings) | Louise | Lawler Studio, Melbourne |
| 2012 | 8 – The Play | Sandy Stier | Her Majesty's Theatre, Melbourne & Sydney Town Hall |
| 2012 | Never Did Me Any Harm | | Southbank Theatre Force Majeure & STC for Melbourne Festival |
| 2013 | The Other Place | Juliana Smithton | Arts Centre Melbourne with MTC |
| 2013 | Phèdre | Phèdre | Malthouse Theatre, Melbourne & Sydney Opera House with Bell Shakespeare |
| 2013 | White Rabbit, Red Rabbit | | Malthouse Theatre, Melbourne |
| 2016; 2018 | The Events | Claire | Granville Town Hall, Her Majesty's Theatre, Adelaide with STCSA for Adelaide Festival, Belvoir St Theatre, Sydney for Sydney Festival, Malthouse Theatre, Melbourne, Studio Underground, Perth, IMB Theatre, Wollongong |
| 2017 | Three Little Words | Tess | Southbank Theatre, Melbourne with MTC |
| 2018 | Antony and Cleopatra | Cleopatra | Sydney Opera House, Canberra Theatre Centre, Arts Centre Melbourne with Bell Shakespeare |
| 2022 | The Sound Inside | Bella Baird | Fairfax Studio, Melbourne with MTC |
| 2022 | Chalkface | Pat Novitsky | Dunstan Playhouse with STCSA & Sydney Opera House with STC |
| 2027 | Stone Yard Devotional | Helen Parry | Malthouse Theatre |
