= In Search of Dr Mabuse =

- Written by: Varcha Sidwell
- Directed by: Varcha Sidwell
- Country of origin: Australia
- Original language: English

Production
- Producer: Varcha Sidwell
- Running time: 30 minutes

Original release
- Network: ABC
- Release: 22 November 1990

In Search of Dr Mabuse is a 1990 Australian television documentary. Created by Varcha Sidwell, it focusses on Robyn Brice who is searching for the second half of a Dr. Mabuse film. Brice developed a passion for old German films after seeing The Cabinet of Dr Caligari as a young child. It won the 1990 AFI Award for Best Television Documentary.
