= Moisture Festival =

Moisture Festival is an annual, four week long, spring festival held in Seattle, Washington. Established in 2004, it is claimed to be the world's largest comedy/variety festival. Performances include musical acts like Jason Webley, comedy acts like Bill Robison, and a variety of circus and burlesque artists.

== History ==
The first festival was organized in 2004, spanned only five days, and was held in a rented tent in Seattle's Fremont district. That same year, Mike Hale, the owner of Hale's Brewery, volunteered to convert his warehouse space into Hale's Palladium. The Palladium has served as the heart of the festival ever since. In 2008, Moisture Festival became an official 501(c)(3) nonprofit organization.

== See also ==
- List of Burlesque festivals
