= Redheads (1992 film) =

- Directed by: Danny Vendramini
- Written by: Danny Vendramini
- Based on: the play Say Thank You to the Lady by Rosie Scott
- Produced by: Richard Mason
- Starring: Claudia Karvan; Catherine McClements
- Cinematography: Steven Mason
- Production company: Roxy Films
- Distributed by: Capricorn Pictures
- Release date: 1992
- Running time: 102 minutes
- Country: Australia
- Language: English

Redheads is a 1992 Australian film directed by Danny Vendramini and starring Claudia Karvan.

== Cast ==
- Claudia Karvan as Lucy Darling
- Catherine McClements as Diana Ferraro
- Mark Hembrow as Brewster
- Sally McKenzie as Warden Zelda
- Jacek Koman as Lawyer
- Anthony Phelan as Inspector Quigley
- Iain Gardiner as McCoy
- Jennifer Flowers as Carolyn
- Josie Vendramini as Jill
- Bella Vendramini as Belinda

== Plot ==
Lucy unknowingly videotapes the murder of her lover, a corrupt lawyer in the Justice Commission. When fleeing from the murder, Lucy attacks a police car. Her file is given to young lawyer, Diana.

== Production ==
The script was developed with the assistance of the Queensland Film Development Office. The film was partly financed by the Film Finance Corporation.

It was filmed in 1991.
