= Wolfe Bowart =

Mime artist

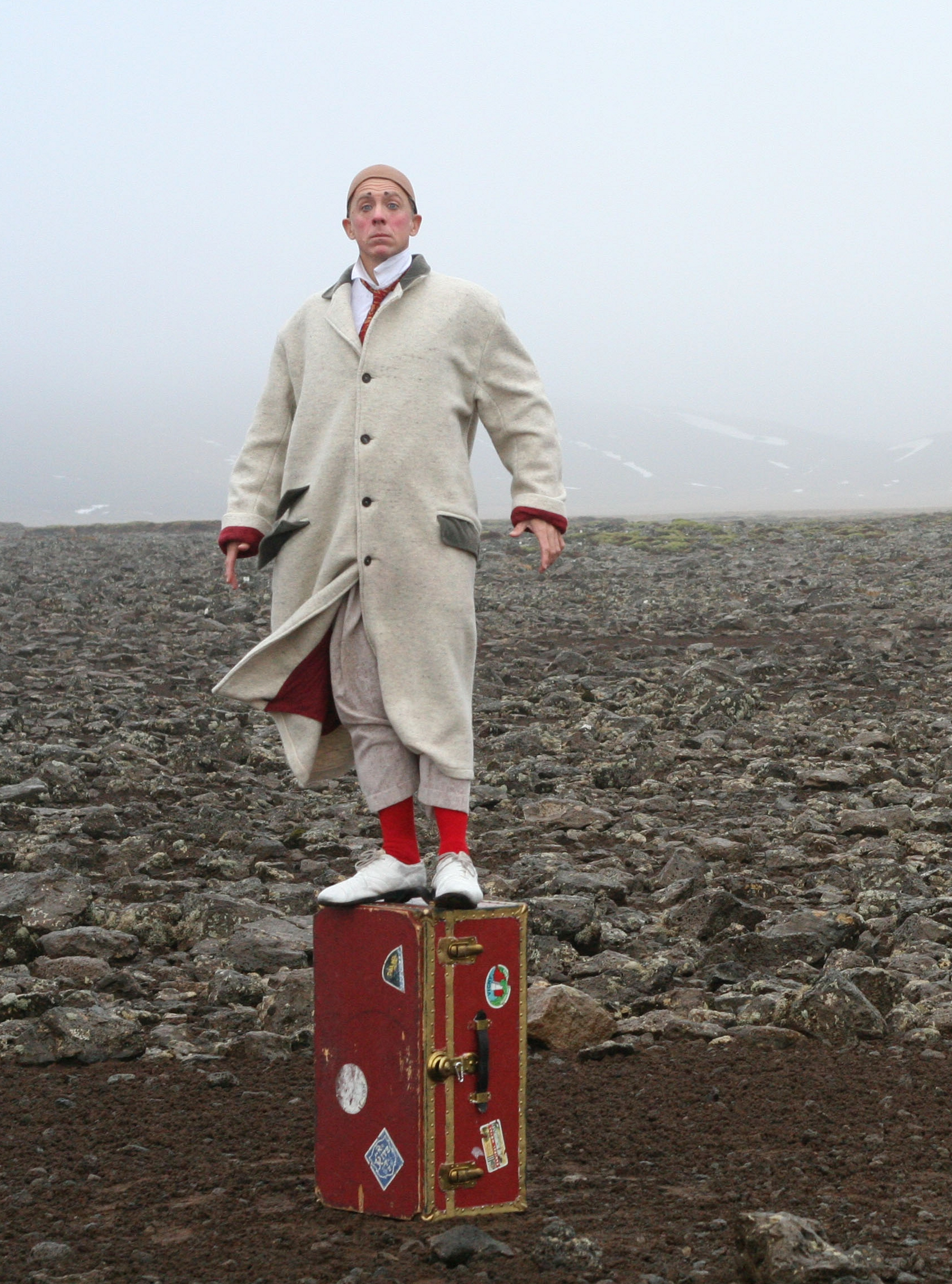
Wolfe Bowart.

Wolfe Bowart (born May 28, 1962) is a physical comedian, actor, director and playwright. He is the creator and performer of the physical theatre productions LaLaLuna, Letter's End and The Man the Sea Saw. Bowart is the son of writer Walter Bowart and Linda Dugmore, and grandson of the abstract expressionist artist Edward Dugmore.

== LaLaLuna ==
In 2006, Bowart premiered LaLaLuna, a surreal tale about the night the light went out in the moon, at the Melbourne International Comedy Festival, the Adelaide Fringe Festival, and the Queensland Performing Arts Centre during the production’s first Australian tour. Written, directed and performed by Bowart, LaLaLuna contains a poetic narrative by Roscoe Lee Browne. Critic Fergus Shiel of The Age proclaimed the show “luminously inventive and magically silly” and Ari Sharp of The Program wrote “Bowart is the ultimate physical performer. He has a breathtaking awareness of his own body, and glides effortlessly across the stage with balletic skill. His sleight-of-hand is magnificent and fits in so neatly that you sometimes barely notice that it’s there, which allows the audience to be swept away in the dreamy mystique that Bowart seeks to create.”

In 2007, LaLaLuna made its UK premiere at the Royal Festival Hall as part of the London International Mime Festival (see review). Bowart also undertook a 40-performance national tour of Australia, and presented LaLaLuna at the Volos International Festival in Greece.

In 2008, Bowart performed LaLaLuna in Hong Kong, New Zealand, Greece and Brazil and returned to Australia for seasons in Sydney (see review), Hobart and in Melbourne at the Arts Centre Melbourne.

Bowart’s 2009 UK tour included performances at the Theatre Royal, Bath, where LaLaLuna headlined the inaugural Family Theatre Festival.

In 2010, Bowart premiered LaLaLuna in New Zealand and Austria, and returned to the UK, where the production was part of the Brighton Festival (curated that year by Brian Eno), the Salisbury International Arts Festival, and completed seasons at the York Theatre Royal (see review), The Lowry in Salford, and Newcastle's Northern Stage, among others.

Bowart continues to tour LaLaLuna internationally. Recent seasons include the Bahrain Summer Festival (2015), Australia's 2015 Awesome Festival (see review), and the 2016 Kuala Lumpur International Arts Festival in Malaysia.

== Letter's End ==
Bowart’s production Letter's End, the story of a man inhabiting a magical lost-letter office, made its U.S. premiere in January 2009 in Tucson, Arizona. Bowart's company SpoonTree Productions was awarded a grant from the Australian government to tour Letter's End nationally in 2009. The Australian tour spanned five and a half months and incorporated 43 venues and 91 performances (see reviews). Reviewing for The Mercury, Robert Jarman noted "the show combines comedy and pathos, mime, magic and sleight of hand, shadow puppetry, film and sound in an exemplary and enchanting mix. The sheer amount of invention is staggering."

In August 2010, Letter's End was nominated for a Helpmann Award for Best Regional Touring Production.

In 2013, Bowart was again invited to participate at the London International Mime Festival. His season of Letter's End at the Southbank Centre marked the production's UK premiere. (see review) The French premiere of "Letter's End" followed soon after, during a tour that included dates at the 2013 Festival Effervescences alongside works by Philippe Genty, Daniele Finzi Pasca and James Thiérrée.

== The Man the Sea Saw ==
Bowart's Australian premiere of The Man the Sea Saw took place in 2011. He undertook a 66-show national tour that spanned 27 venues and concluded with a season at His Majesty's Theatre in Perth, Western Australia, where The Man the Sea Saw headlined the 2011 Awesome Festival.

The adventures of a man adrift at sea on a melting iceberg prompted Perth critic David Zampatti to write "Bowart acts wordlessly but with boundless expression, his silent movie-actor's face, acrobat's body and magician's hands telling us all we need to know."

In 2012, The Man the Sea Saw was nominated for a Helpmann Award for Best Visual or Physical Theatre Production.

In 2014, Bowart undertook a 7-city of China and South Korea with The Man the Sea Saw. The tour marked Bowart's Chinese premiere.

== The Shneedles ==
As artistic director and co-creator of The Shneedles, Bowart, together with fellow clown Bill Robison, have performed in Japan, Singapore, Australia (see review), Germany, Austria, Spain, Iceland and the U.S. The Shneedles most recently completed a 6-month season in Germany in 2007 for GOP-Varieté Theaters.

== Director/actor/writer/artist ==
As a guest artist at the University of Arizona School of Theatre, Film & Television, Bowart directed From the Fishbowl, an original work co-devised with theatre students. Created during the COVID-19 pandemic, it streamed online for a global audience in April 2021. The production features seven actors moving between stage and screen as they explore what it means to live in a world that has become both socially distant and yet somehow more personal. In a review for The Theatre Times, Michael Schweikardt wrote that From the Fishbowl "documents the moment of a young person struggling to come of age during the pandemic better than any oral history or written diary account ever could."

In 2026, Bowart served on the creative team for George & Gracie: A Love Story, a world premiere production at the Milwaukee Repertory Theater. Written by Tami Workentin and directed by Laura Braza, the production traces the personal and professional partnership of George Burns and Gracie Allen. Bowart was credited as co-sound designer and as the production’s magic and movement coordinator, contributing to both its technical design and physical storytelling. Drawing on his background in visual and physical theatre, his work incorporated elements of stage illusion and vaudeville-inspired performance, reflecting the stylistic traditions associated with Burns and Allen.

As an artist, Bowart was commissioned to create the masks for the visual theatre production ¡Bocón!, a play by Lisa Loomer produced by the Mark Taper Forum in Los Angeles. He was credited as both mask designer and as a Workshop Leader for the production.

As a playwright-performer, Bowart created Harold's Big Feat, which was directed by Peter Brosius and produced by the Mark Taper Forum's P.L.A.Y. (Performing for Los Angeles Youth).

As an actor in the U.S., Bowart has guest-starred on TV programs on ABC, CNBC, the Disney Channel and PBS. On the stage, he has performed in such productions as Moon Over Madness at the John Anson Ford Amphitheatre in Hollywood, and in The Joy of Going Somewhere Definite at the Mark Taper Forum.

Bowart has also co-written several motion picture and television screenplays on assignment, including “eye-see-you.com,” the season finale episode of the television series The Net for the USA Network, which aired in March 1999.

Bowart is a Theater graduate of Cornish College of the Arts in Seattle, Washington.
