= The Book of Everything =

2004 children's novel by Guus Kuijer

The Book of Everything (Dutch: Het boek van alle dingen) is a children's novel by Dutch author Guus Kuijer, published in 2004 by Querido.

The book was awarded the Gouden Griffel literary award in 2005.

The English translation was published in 2006.

== Stage adaptation ==
The Book of Everything was adapted for the stage by Australian playwright Richard Tulloch. The adaptation was first produced by Company B Belvoir and Kim Carpenter’s Theatre of Image at Belvoir St Upstairs Theatre, Sydney, on 2 January 2010, with the following cast:

- Margot: Alison Bell
- Father / Bumbiter: Peter Carroll
- Mrs. van Amersfoort: Julie Forsyth
- Musician: Iain Grandage
- Mother: Claire Jones
- Aunty Pie: Deborah Kennedy
- Jesus: John Leary
- Eliza: Yael Stone
- Thomas: Matthew Whittet
  - Director, Neil Armfield
  - Set & costume designer, Kim Carpenter
  - Composer, Iain Grandage
  - Lighting designer, Nigel Levings
  - Choreographer, Julia Cotton
  - Sound designer, Steve Francis

This production was nominated for Best Play at the 2010 Helpmann Awards. The script was published in 2011 by Currency Press.

The production was also performed off-Broadway at the New Victory Theater in New York City in 2012, and in Melbourne in 2013.
