= Julie Forsyth =

Australian actress

- Born: Australia
- Education: Monash University
- Occupation: Actress
- Years active: 1984–present
- Known for: Dead Gorgeous (2010); Stan and George's New Life (1992)

Julie Forsyth is an Australian actress best known for her stage performances, and as Lotis, the talking lift from Lift Off.

== Early life ==
In 1976, Forsyth left home to attend Monash University in Melbourne. She enrolled to do a BA with the intention of going on to study education and become a teacher of French and English. After watching student plays however, she auditioned and was cast in Brecht’s A Man’s a Man.

Forsyth started going to see shows at the Pram Factory, and after auditioning, was cast in the one-woman show A Banquet of Vipers. When the Pram Factory closed its doors a year later, she became a member of the Australian Nouveau Theatre in 1981, and decided not to continue her university studies.

== Career ==
Throughout the 1980s and 1990s, Forsythe worked closely with director Jean Pierre Mignon at the Anthill theatre company in Melbourne. Her solo performance as a schoolboy in Kids' Stuff for Anthill, (first performed in 1984), toured Australia and festivals in Europe and Singapore.

Her more recent work at Belvoir, Melbourne Theatre Company, Malthouse Theatre and other major Australian theatre companies has included roles in Patrick White’s The Ham Funeral and Night on Bald Mountain, Eugène Ionesco’s Exit the King, the stage adaptation of Tim Winton’s Cloudstreet, and Samuel Beckett’s Happy Days and Endgame.

Forsyth has also appeared in many tv series and films. In 2010, she appeared in Dead Gorgeous in the main role as Haiwyn Sinclaire (a.k.a. Miss Sinclair). In 2013 she appeared in an episode of Miss Fisher's Murder Mysteries (S2:E2), "Death Comes Knocking". More recently she appeared in the miniseries Joe vs Carole, based on Joe Exotic and Carole Baskin from the hit documentary Tiger King.

She co-starred alongside Paul Chubb in Stan and George's New Life as George (1992). More recently, she appeared in Academy Award-winning film The Power of the Dog (2021).

She has received multiple awards, including the Sidney Myer Performing Arts Award and Helpmann Awards as both leading and supporting female actor in a play.

== Acting credits ==
=== Film ===
Year	Title	Role	Type
1984	Strikebound	Women’s Auxilary	Feature film
1987	Feathers	Olila	Feature film
1988	Pleasure Domes	Voiceover	Feature film
1990	Catch of the Day	Jane	Animated short film
1990	Aya	Mandy	Feature film
1992	Stan and George's New Life	George	Feature film
1994	Babe	Sheep (voice)	Feature film
1994	Trapped	Lead	Short film
1995	What I Have Written	Doctor	Feature film
1996	Caleopy's Lorikeet	Laurie	Feature film
1996	The Sound of One Hand Clapping	Mrs Heaney	Feature film
1998	Edithvale	Edith	Feature film
2003	Harvie Krumpet	Lilliana Krumpetzki / Baby Harvie / Church singer	Animated short film
2004	Tom White	Tania	Feature film
2006	Three Dollars	Tailor.	Feature film
2007	Romulus, My Father	Nurse	Feature film
2009	Piñata	Funeral Director.	Short film
2009	Mary and Max	Additional voices	Animated feature film
2010	Seamstress	Enid	Feature film
2012	Kath & Kimderella	Queen Christina	Feature film
2015	Holding the Man	Aunty Gae	Feature film
2021	The Power of the Dog	Mrs Mueller	Feature film
2023	Foe	Junior’s Mum	Feature film

=== Television ===
Year	Title	Role	Type
1990	One Summer Again	Annie McCubbin	TV miniseries
1990	Waterfront	Miss Hipple	TV miniseries
1991–94	Lift Off	Lotis (voice)	TV series
1994	The Damnation of Harvey McHugh	Yvonne	TV miniseries
1995	Gettin' On	Prue	TV series
1995–96	Mercury	Tess MacDonald	TV series
1996	Hospital	Narrator	Documentary
1997	Li'l Monsters	Morbidda	
1998	Small Tales & True	Sara Donovan	
2000	Eugénie Sandler P.I.	Desk Officer	TV series
2003	Fat Cow Motel	Penny	TV series
2003	Kath & Kim	Sheila	TV series, season 2
2003	MDA	Karen Rees	TV series
2004	The Brush Off	Bernice Kaufman	TV movie
2007	Real Stories	Janice	TV series
2010	Dead Gorgeous	Haiwyn Sinclaire	TV series
2012	Winners & Losers	Mrs Judy Faine	TV series
2013	Miss Fisher's Murder Mysteries	Mrs Bolkonsky	TV series, season 2, episode 2: "Death Comes Knocking"
2014	Wentworth	Lorraine Evelyn	TV series, season 2
2021	Joe vs. Carole	Anne McQueen	TV miniseries

=== Theatre ===
Year	Title	Role	Type
1980	Banquet of Vipers		Pram Factory, Melbourne, Parks Community Centre for Adelaide Festival
1981	Quick Death to Infinity	The Woman	La Mama, Melbourne, Salamanca Arts Centre, Hobart, Anthill Theatre, Melbourne
1981	Pour en Finir avec le Jugement de Dieu (aka To Have Done with the Judgment of God)		Anthill Theatre, Melbourne
1981	Exiles	Mrs Gower	Anthill Theatre, Melbourne
1982	Ruins	The Old Woman	Anthill Theatre, Melbourne
1982	The Hamletmachine	MC	Anthill Theatre, Melbourne
1982	The White Door	Solo performance	Anthill Theatre, Melbourne
1982	The Condemned of Altona	Leni	Anthill Theatre, Melbourne
1982	The Stranger in the House	The Mother	Anthill Theatre, Melbourne
1983	Tartuffe	Dorine	Anthill Theatre, Melbourne, Universal Theatre, Melbourne
1983	Slow Love		Anthill Theatre, Melbourne
1983	Tengul		Anthill Theatre, Melbourne
1983	Summer of the Seventeenth Doll		Anthill Theatre, Melbourne
1984	Don Juan	Charlotte	Playhouse, Adelaide with STCSA, St. Vincent de Paul's Girls' Orphanage, Melbourne
1984	Romeo and Juliet		Playhouse, Adelaide with STCSA
1984	The Time Is Not Yet Ripe	Lady Pillsbury	Playhouse, Adelaide with STCSA
1984; 1985; 1987; 1988; 1989	Kids' Stuff	Schoolboy	Anthill Theatre, Melbourne, Brown's Mart Theatre, Darwin, Belvoir Street Theatre, Sydney, Perth, Adelaide Festival, Donmar Warehouse, London, Assembly Rooms, Edinburgh, Singapore Festival, Aarhus Denmark & Tasmania
1985	The Misanthrope	Celimene	Anthill Theatre, Wharf Theatre with STC
1985	Macbeth	Lasy Macbeth	Warehouse, South Melbourne with Australian Nouveau Theatre
1987	The Cherry Orchard	Madame Ranevskaya	Anthill Theatre
1987	Uncle Vanya	Sonia	Anthill Theatre
1987	The Thief / The Drought		Anthill Theatre
1987	An Ordinary Dream about a Journey North		Anthill Theatre
1987	Three Sisters	Olga	Anthill Theatre
1988	Summer of the Seventeenth Doll	Olive	Melbourne Athenaeum, SLF Auditorium / Singapore Festival of the Arts
1989–90	The Imaginary Invalid	Toinette	New Fortune Theatre for Perth Festival, Anthill Theatre, Universal Theatre, Melbourne, Armoury Lawns, Adelaide
1989	Joan of Arc at the Stake		Melbourne Concert Hall
1989	Happy Days	Winnie	Anthill Theatre
1990–91	The Wooden Child	Voiceover artist	Castlemaine Library Hall, Melbourne, Universal Theatre, Melbourne, Sydney Opera House
1990	Peer Gynt		Universal Theatre
1991	In the Cold Cold Morning Light	Bebe	Anthill Theatre
1991	Endgame		Anthill Theatre for Melbourne International Comedy Festival
1991	The Marriage of Figaro	Suzanne	Playhouse, Melbourne with MTC
1992	The Crimson Island	Metelkin / Passepartout / Parrot	Royalty Theatre, Adelaide with Anthill Theatre for Adelaide Festival
1992	The Chairs		Anthill Theatre
1992	Life is a Dream		Gasworks Theatre for Melbourne International Arts Festival
1992	The School for Wives	Georgette	Gasworks Theatre
1993	The Stranger in the House	The Mother	Anthill Theatre
1993	Mother Courage and her Children	Mother Courage	Gasworks Theatre
1993	The Force of Habit		Gasworks Theatre
1993	Kids' Stuff		Victorian regional tour & Gasworks Theatre, Melbourne
1995	The Ham Funeral	Mrs Lusty	Budinskis Theatre of Exile, Melbourne
1995	Shorts Programme 1: Ned / The Flying Doctor / The Bear / Out at Sea		Fairfax Studio with MTC
1995	Shorts Programme 2: This Property is Condemned / Love / Family Running For Mr Whippy / Like Whiskey on the Breath of a Drunk You Love		Fairfax Studio with MTC
1995–96	Daze of Our Lives	Housewife	Fairfax Studio, Glen Street Theatre, Space Theatre, Adelaide with Handspan Theatre
1996	A Cheery Soul	Mrs Watmuff / Little Girl #2	Playhouse, Melbourne with MTC
1997	The Comedy of Errors	Courtesan	Playhouse, Melbourne with MTC
1997	After Magritte and The Real Inspector Hound	Mother / Felicity	Playhouse, Melbourne with MTC
1997	Mr September		Old Courthouse Building, Geelong with Back to Back Theatre Company
1998	The Caucasian Chalk Circle	Grusha	Belvoir Street Theatre
1998-99	Cloudstreet	Red Lamb / various roles	Berth 9, Darling Harbour, Sydney with Company B Belvoir for Sydney Festival, Playhouse, Adelaide with STCSA, Malthouse Theatre, Black Swan Theatre Company for Perth Festival, Zurich, London, Dublin
2000	The Chairs	Old Woman	Fairfax Studio with MTC
2000	The Ham Funeral	The Landlady	Belvoir Street Theatre
2000	The Small Poppies	Mrs Walsh	The Butter Factory Theatre, Playhouse, Melbourne for Melbourne International Arts Festival, Belvoir Street Theatre for Sydney Festival, Dublin Festival
2001	Man the Balloon	Mayor Flummery / Dr Hindenburg	Fairfax Studio with MTC
2001	The Tempest	Trinculo	Playhouse, Melbourne with MTC for Melbourne International Arts Festival
2001	The Old Masters	Dorotea Fromm	Wharf Theatre with STC
2002	Great Expectations	Mrs Jo / Miss Skiffins / various roles	Playhouse, Melbourne with MTC, Sydney Opera House with STC
2003	The Visit	Ottolie Schill / Frau Siementhofer	Playhouse, Melbourne with MTC
2003	Babes in the Wood	Boingle	Malthouse Theatre with Playbox, Melbourne
2004	The Miser	Froisine	Sydney Opera House with STC
2005	A Journal of the Plague Year	Worgret	Malthouse Theatre
2005	The Ham Funeral	Landlady	Malthouse Theatre
2005	The Metamorphosis	Mrs Samsa	Wharf Theatre, Malthouse Theatre with STC
2006; 2008	Babes in the Wood	Boingle	Malthouse Theatre, Sydney Opera House
2007	Exit the King	Juliette	Malthouse Theatre, Belvoir Street Theatre
2007	The Madwoman of Chaillot	Mademoiselle Gabrielle	Playhouse, Melbourne with MTC
2007	Dimboola	Florence Delaney	Malthouse Theatre (Rehearsed Reading)
2008	Moving Target	Ensemble	Odeon Theatre, Norwood, Malthouse Theatre with Adelaide Festival
2009	Happy Days	Winnie	Malthouse Theatre, Belvoir Street Theatre
2010	Elizabeth: Almost by Chance a Woman	Elizabeth	Malthouse Theatre
2009; 2012–13	The Book of Everything	Mrs Van Amersfoort	Belvoir Street Theatre, Seymour Centre, New Victory Theater, New York with MTC
2011	Return to Earth	Wendy Waster	Fairfax Studio, Melbourne with MTC
2013	Phèdre	Oenone	Malthouse Theatre, Sydney Opera House with Bell Shakespeare
2013	Romeo and Juliet	Nurse	Sydney Opera House with STC
2014	Private Lives	Louise	Southbank Theatre with MTC
2014	Night on Bald Mountain	Miss Quodling	Malthouse Theatre
2014	The Dream	Puck	Playhouse, Canberra, Playhouse, Melbourne, Illawarra Performing Arts Centre with Bell Shakespeare
2015	The Unknown Man on Somerton Beach		VCA Art Courtyard with MTC
2015	Endgame	Nell	Southbank Theatre with MTC
2015	Frogs Cry Wolf		MTC
2016	‘O’ The Play	All Roles	Big hART
2015–17	The Popular Mechanicals	Robin Starveling	Space Theatre, Adelaide & SA regional tour with STCSA, Wharf Theatre with STC, Canberra Theatre Centre
2017	The Real and Imagined History of the Elephant Man	Ensemble	Malthouse Theatre
2018	The House of Bernarda Alba	Penelope	Arts Centre Melbourne with MTC
2018	Accidental Death of an Anarchist	Inspector Bertozzo	Sydney Opera House with STC
2018	Bottomless	Judith / various drunks	Fortyfivedownstairs
2019	Escaped Alone	Mrs Jarrett	Red Stitch Actors Theatre
2020	Do Not Go Gentle...		Malthouse Theatre
2024	The President	Mrs Frolick	The Gate Theatre with STC

== Awards and nominations ==
Year	Nominated work	Award	Category	Result
1993	Kids’ Stuff	Green Room Awards	Best Actress	Won
1999	Cloudstreet	Green Room Awards	Best Ensemble Playing by a Cast of Actors	Won
2000	The Chairs	Green Room Awards	Female Actor in a Lead Role	Nominated
2001	The Tempest	Green Room Awards	Best Female Actor in a Supporting Role	Nominated
2003	Great Expectations	Helpmann Awards	Best Female Actor in a Supporting Role in a Play	Nominated
2005	The Ham Funeral	Helpmann Awards	Best Female Actor in a Play	Nominated
2007	Exit the King	Sydney Theatre Awards	Best Actress in a Supporting Role	Nominated
2008	Moving Target	Green Room Awards	Best Ensemble Playing by a Cast of Actors	Won
2008	Exit the King	Helpmann Awards	Best Female Actor in a Supporting Role in a Play	Won
2009	Julie Forsyth	Sidney Myer Performing Arts Awards	Individual Award	Won
2009	Happy Days	Sydney Theatre Awards	Best Actress in a Lead Role	Nominated
2009	Happy Days	Green Room Awards	Best Female Performer Lead Role	Nominated
2010	Happy Days	Helpmann Awards	Best Female Actor in a Play	Won
2013	The Book of Everything	Green Room Awards	Best Ensemble Playing by a Cast of Actors	Won
2013	The Book of Everything	Green Room Awards	Best Female Actor	Nominated
2015	Endgame	Green Room Awards	Best Female Actor for Endgame	Nominated
2015	Endgame	Helpmann Awards	Best Female Actor in a Supporting Role in a Play	Nominated
2015	Night On Bald Mountain	Helpmann Awards	Best Female Actor in a Play	Nominated
