= The Blind Giant Is Dancing =

1983 play written by Stephen Sewell

- Cover image shows Hugo Weaving (left) and Catherine McClements (right)
- Author: Stephen Sewell
- Language: English
- Genre: Play
- Publisher: Currency Press
- Publication date: 1983
- Publication place: Australia
- Media type: Print (Paperback)
- ISBN: 978-0-86819-492-9

The Blind Giant Is Dancing is a play by Australian playwright Stephen Sewell. It received the 1985 New South Wales Premier's Literary Award.

== Plot ==
An examination of the way political power can corrupt the individual and society at large

== First production ==
The Blind Giant Is Dancing was first produced by the State Theatre Company of South Australia on 15 October 1983 with the following cast and crew:

- Graham White / Bruce Fitzgerald: Russell Kiefel
- Mr Carew / Greg: Robert Grubb
- Michael Wells: Stuart McCreery
- Allen Fitzgerald: Geoffrey Rush
- Louise Kraus: Jacqy Phillips
- Jane: Robynne Bourne
- Rose Draper: Gillian Jones
- Janice Lang / Robin: Melita Jurisic
- Bob Lang / Sir Leslie Harris: John Wood
- Ramon Gris: Igor Sas
- Doug Fitzgerald: Peter Cummins
- Eileen Fitzgerald: Kerry Walker
- Neil Armfield, director
- Stephen Curtis, designer
- Alan John, composer
- Nigel Levings, lighting designer

== Revivals ==
The play was revived by Neil Armfield for Belvoir in 1995, with Russell Kiefel, Gillian Jones and Kerry Walker from the original cast, plus Hugo Weaving, Cate Blanchett, Peter Carroll, Jason Clarke, Jacek Koman, Catherine McClements, Keith Robinson and Steve Rodgers.

In 2016 Belvoir performed a second revival directed by Eamon Flack. Dan Spielman took the leading role, with the cast including Yael Stone, Genevieve Lemon, Geoff Morrell, Zahra Newman and Ben Wood. Russell Kiefel made his third appearance in the play, this time as Doug Fitzgerald, father of the main character.
