= Jerzy Domaradzki =

Polish-born film director

- Born: 6 January 1943 (age 83); Lwów, occupied Poland (now Lviv, Ukraine)
- Education: National Film School in Łódź
- Occupation: Film director

Jerzy Domaradzki (born 6 January 1943, in Lwów, occupied Poland) is a Polish-born film director based in Australia. He is most closely associated with Poland's film industry.

== Education and Career ==
Following his 1974 graduation from the National Film School in Łódź, Domaradzki got his start working as an assistant and second unit director. He then worked with Andrzej Wajda for the "X" film unit. Director of movies Bestia (1979), Wielki bieg (1981), Planeta krawiec (1983), Biały smok (1987), Łuk Erosa (1987).

His Australian Productions include Struck by Lightning (1990), Lilian's Story (1996).

In addition to his movie career, Domaradzki also directs television, documentary, and theatrical productions. In the late '80s, he moved to Australia and in 1988 was appointed director-in-residence at the Australian Film, Television and Radio School in Sydney.
