= Portland Juggling Festival =

Annual juggling convention in Portland, Oregon, U.S.

- Logo
- Status: Active
- Frequency: Annually
- Location: Portland, Oregon
- Country: United States

Portland Juggling Festival is an annual juggling convention in Portland, Oregon, United States. Established in 1992, it is among the nation's largest regional juggling festivals. Approximately 300 people attend the festival, which is traditionally held the first weekend of June. Reed College often hosts the event.

== History ==
The event was established by Reed College student Stuart Celarier and others in 1992. Albyn Jones has been credited as "one of the kingpins" behind the festival. According to The Wall Street Journal, "The festival, which attracts jugglers from all over the country, was founded by mathematicians and grew out of an unorthodox physical education class taught by mathematics professors at a local unorthodox institution of higher learning, Reed College."

Approximately 400 people participated in 2008. The 2012, 2013, 2016, and 2017 festivals were held on the Reed College campus. The 2012 event had performers and 31 workshops.

The event was held at Alberta Abbey in 2022. The three-day festival in 2023 was held at Reed College and had games and workshops. The campus hosted again in 2024.

The 2025 event was held on the Reed College campus and was free for students to attend. The campus hosted again in 2026. The event was billed as the "Portland Juggling Festival & Vaudeville Extravaganza".

== See also ==
- Culture of Portland, Oregon
- List of festivals in the United States
