= Ian David =

Australian writer

- Occupation: Screenwriter
- Known for: Blue Murder

Ian David is an Australian writer, best known for his work in television, particularly adaptations of true stories such as Police Crop: The Winchester Conspiracy, Joh's Jury and Blue Murder.

== Select Credits ==
- A Country Practice
- Police Crop: The Winchester Conspiracy (1990) – TV movie
- Joh's Jury (1992) – TV movie
- Blue Murder (1995) – mini series
- Bad Cop, Bad Cop (2002) – TV series
- The Shark Net (2003) – TV mini series
- 3 Acts of Murder (2009) – TV movie
- Killing Time (2011) – TV mini series
