= Police Crop: The Winchester Conspiracy =

- Written by: Ian David
- Directed by: Ken Cameron
- Starring: Gerard Kennedy; Terry Gill; Frankie J. Holden
- Music by: Yuri Worontschak
- Country of origin: Australia
- Original language: English

Production
- Producer: Rod Allen
- Cinematography: Chris Davis
- Editor: David Luffman
- Running time: 100 mins
- Production companies: ABC; Southern Star; Australian Film Commission

Original release
- Network: ABC
- Release: 21 March 1990

Police Crop: The Winchester Conspiracy is a 1990 Australian television film based on Operation Seville and the assassination of Colin Winchester.

== Plot ==
Television movie looking at the events surrounding the assassination of Federal Deputy Police Commissioner, Colin Winchester. Also known as 'Police State NSW' and 'The Black Hand'.

== Cast ==
- Luciano Catenacci as Giuseppe Verduci
- Terry Gill as Det. Sgt. Bill Cullen
- Frankie J. Holden as Det. Con. Max Chapman
- Gerard Kennedy as Asst. Commissioner Colin Winchester
- Tim Robertson as Det. Sgt. Brian Lockwood
- Peter Hosking as Sgt. Franklin

== Release ==
Police Crop: The Winchester Conspiracy was released on ABC TV on March 21, 1990.

=== Home media ===
As of February 2023, the film has not received any Home Media Release.
