= Struck by Lightning (1990 film) =

- Directed by: Jerzy Domaradzki
- Written by: Trevor Farrant
- Produced by: Terry J. Charatsis; Trevor Farrant
- Starring: Garry McDonald; Brian Vriends; Catherine McClements
- Cinematography: Yuri Sokol
- Edited by: Simon James
- Music by: Paul Smyth
- Release date: 11 October 1990
- Running time: 105 minutes
- Country: Australia
- Language: English
- Budget: A$2.6 million

Struck by Lightning is a 1990 Australian film directed by Jerzy Domaradzki. The film was nominated in 4 AFI Award categories, including Best Director and Best Film. It won the film award at the Human Rights Medal and Awards in 1990.

== Plot summary ==
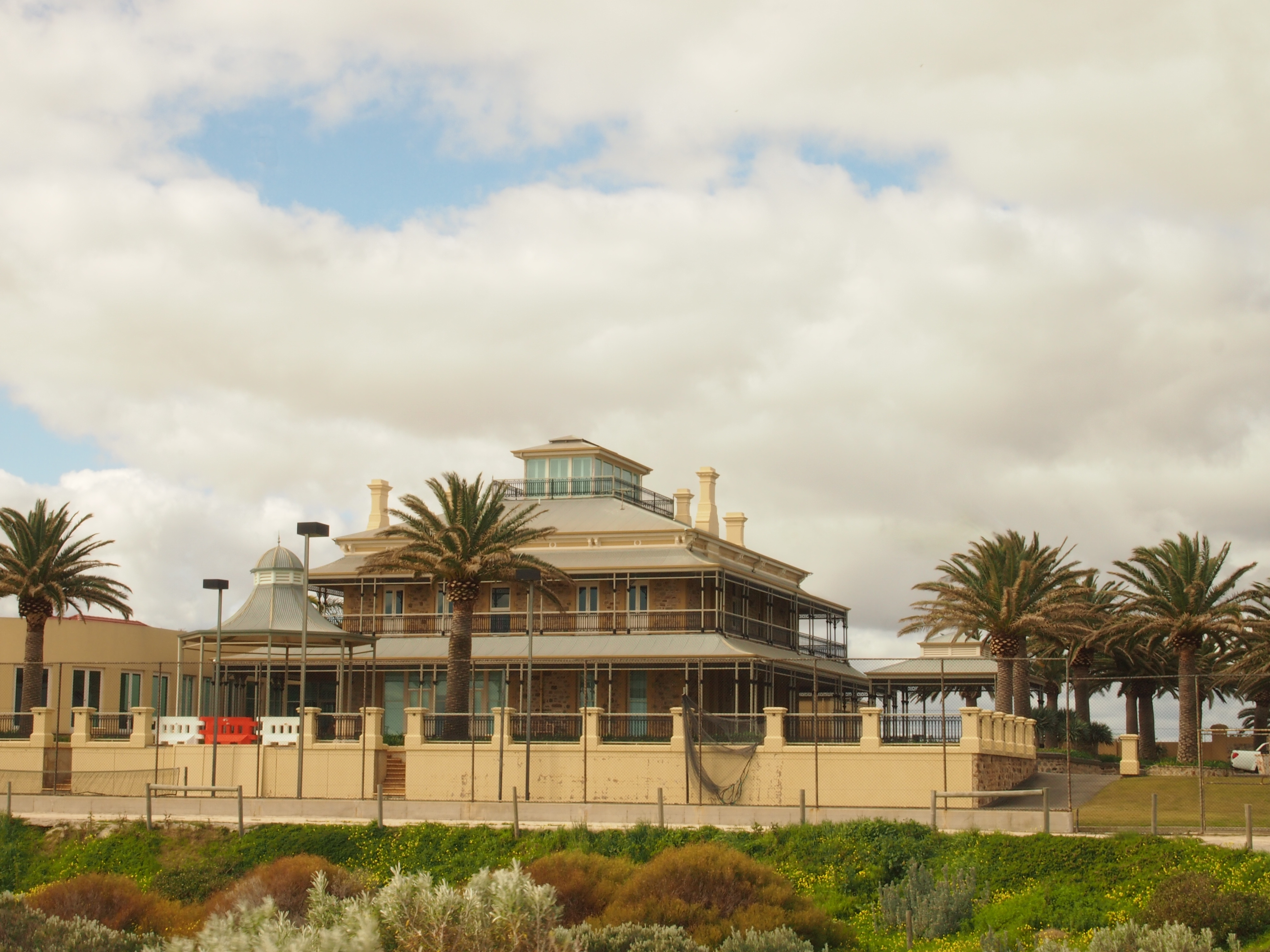
Estcourt House, Tennyson, South Australia, "Saltmarsh" in the film Struck by Lightning

Garry McDonald plays Ollie, a grumpy alcoholic workshop supervisor at a shelter called Saltmarsh. He hires Pat (Brian Vriends), a school teacher, to develop an experimental fitness program for the intellectually disabled young adults in the shelter. Pat teaches P.E and decides to try to get them involved in soccer, with some interesting results. Jill is Ollie's social worker, whom Ollie calls 'the bitch'.

== Cast ==
- Garry McDonald as Ollie Rennie
- Brian Vriends as Pat Cannizzaro
- Catherine McClements as Jill McHugh
- Gary George as Gary
- Henry Salter as Noel
- Denis Moore as Foster
- Briony Williams as Gail
- Syd Brisbane as Spencer
- Brian M. Logan as Kevin
- Jon Fabian as Vince Cannizzaro

== Production ==
In February 1989 Jerzy Domaradzki was working with writer Trevor Farrant on another script when Farrant gave him the screenplay for Struck by Lightning. The director loved it, Terry Charatsis applied for funding to the Film Finance Corporation and managed to get the film up. It was shot in November 1989 in Adelaide.

== Reception ==
Critics' reception was generally positive to glowing ("charming and exhilarating black comedy, marvellously acted by the whole cast."), but the Australian audience stayed away, perhaps deterred by its "improving" nature, and abetted by low-key promotion and hesitant distribution. It has been played on free-to-air TV a few times. There was a limited VHS, but to date no DVD, release.

== See also ==
- Cinema of Australia
