= Weekend with Kate =

- Directed by: Arch Nicholson
- Produced by: Phillip Emanuel
- Starring: Colin Friels; Catherine McClements
- Music by: Bruce Rowland
- Release date: 1990
- Country: Australia
- Language: English
- Box office: A$16,019 (Australia)

Weekend with Kate is a 1990 Australian film directed by Arch Nicholson and starring Colin Friels and Catherine McClements.

== Cast ==
- Colin Friels as Richard Muir
- Catherine McClements as Kate Muir
- Kate Sheil as Phoebe
- Jerome Ehlers as Jon Thorne
