= Bill Robison =

- Born: William Ray Robison; December 5, 1957 (age 68); Denver, Colorado, U.S.
- Occupation: Physical theatre artist
- Years active: 1976–present

William Ray Robison (born December 5, 1957, in Denver, Colorado) is an American physical theatre artist.

== Career ==
Bill Robison is currently working as a solo act. In his previous work, he was one of the two clowns that made up the performance duo, The Shneedles, (Robison and Wolfe Bowart) with whom he has traveled the world. Their show "Luggage" toured in several countries. They have also performed in numerous comedy festivals and German Variety theaters.

== Current activities ==
Robison is currently performing at Fairs and Festivals across the United States. He has also performed on Cruise Ships, at Comedy Festivals and corporate events. Bill is frequently a performer and MC at the Moisture Festival in Seattle.
