= Australian Nouveau Theatre =

Australian Nouveau Theatre, also known as the Anthill Theatre, was a Melbourne-based theatre company under the direction of Jean-Pierre Mignon. Operating from 1980 to 1994, it concentred on classic European drama, often in experimental productions.

After early productions at La Mama and the Pram Factory, the Australian Nouveau Theatre took over the Temperance Hall in Napier Street, South Melbourne in 1981, renaming it the Anthill Theatre. Mignon, who was from northern France, had wanted to create an Australian company with a Parisian theatre vision, welding both experimental and classical theatre modes to connect with theatre's "originary power" without being old-fashioned. Around Mignon gathered a circle of energetic and innovative actors and designers and they had their own company translator, Katherine Sturak. After setting up the Anthill Theatre ANT became a magnet for experiment and creativity. The first play production at Anthill was in May 1981, an Antonin Artaud double bill "Artaud and Cruelty: Quick Death to Infinity / To Have Done with the Judgement of God" directed by Mignon and performed by Bruce Keller (cofounder of ANT), Julie Forsyth and Gary Samolin. Mignon followed that up by directing Alex Miller's But then the Anthill opened up for none-ANT innovation, starting with a production of Polish writer Stanislaw Witkacy's "The Madman and the Nun" directed by Nicholas Tsoutas and followed by Paul Adkin's "The Jack and Jill Story" directed by Adkin himself and performed by Carmelian Di Guglielmo In the same year there was a playreading of Adkin's "Dying in the 80s" and Wayne Macauley's adaptation of Franz Kafka's "A Hunger Artist" performed by Macauley himself and directed by Martin Christmas And the spring-summer term was even more prolific with "Mannequins Too", September; a version in French by ANT of "To Have Done with the Judgement of God" in October; Dario Fo's "Not Drowning But Waving: Waking Up / Can't Help Dreaming" directed by Tsoutas; a reading of Bill Marshall's "The Canal of Venice"; David Tolley's "A Play on Playing"; a series of puppet shows in November; Chris Dickens "The Violin Bird" and a version of Tennessee William's "Desire"; and finishing the year with an Antill "Survival Benefit Night".

The criteria deployed for selecting plays was radically non-realist, intended to "make it possible for an audience to have a powerful metaphysical experience, to feel cleansed and purified, ready for rebirth and renewed life."

Some other notable works by ANT include an innovative 1983 production of Summer of the Seventeenth Doll, a Molière triptych first performed in 1984, and Julie Forsyth's solo performance of Kid's Stuff by Raymond Cousse. Various Australian Nouveau Theatre productions toured Australia and were performed at major international arts festivals.

Australian Nouveau Theatre moved to the larger and newly developed Gasworks Theatre in 1992, before closing under funding pressure in 1994.

== Bibliography ==
- Meyrick, Julian (2002). Australian Theatre after the New Wave: Policy, Subsidy and the Alternative Artist. Brill Rodopi. ISBN 978-90-04-33988-0.
