= Awesome Festival =

Arts festival in Perth, Western Australia

Coordinates: 31°57′07″S 115°49′14″E

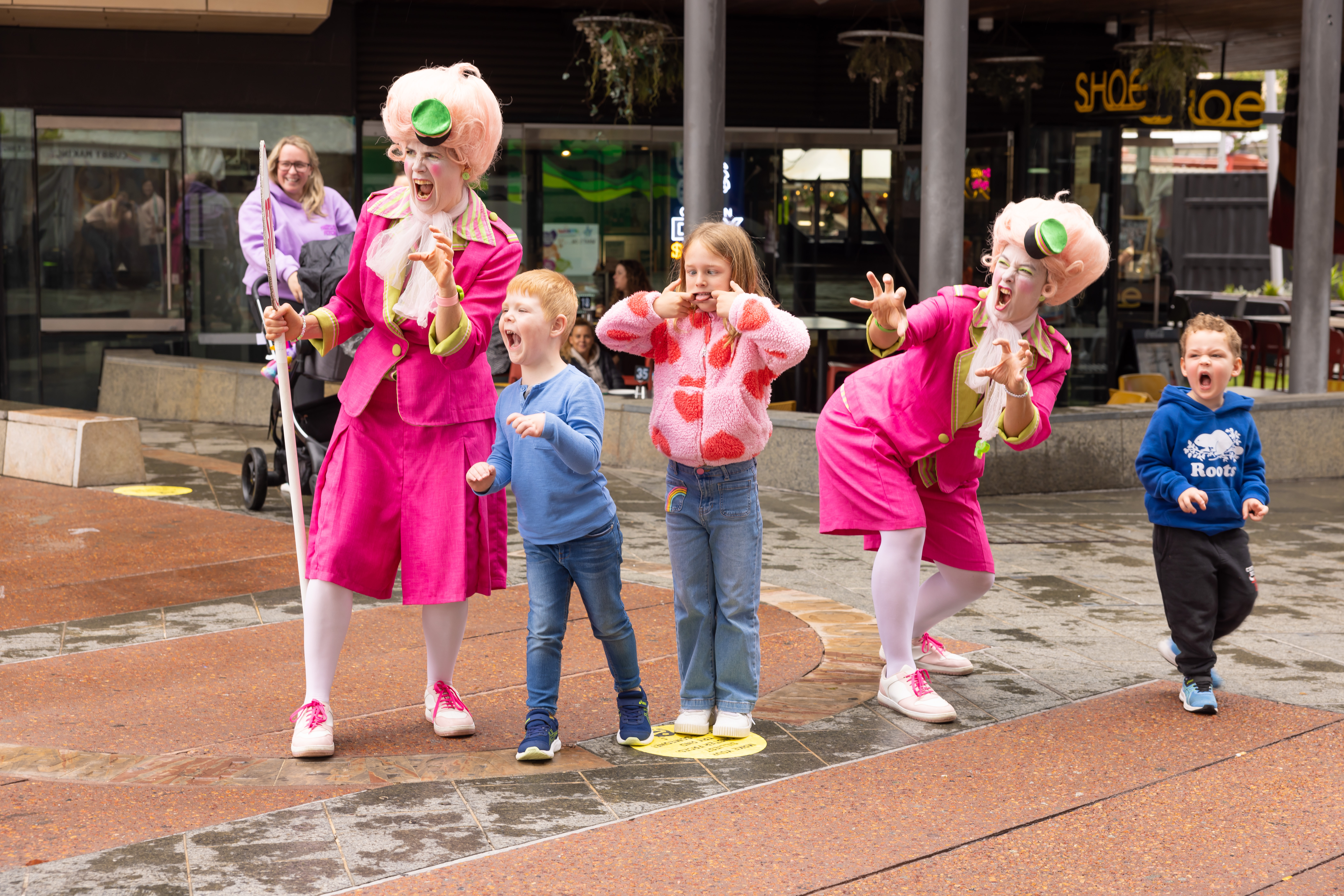
- Lollipop ladies in 2024
- Frequency: Annual
- Inaugurated: 1996
- Most recent: September 30 – October 4, 2025
- Organiser: Barking Gecko Arts
- Website: https://barkinggecko.com.au/awesome-festival

Awesome Festival (in full Awesome International Arts Festival for Bright Young Things) is an arts event in Perth, Western Australia held annually since 1996. The participation and interaction of younger visitors is encouraged by street theatre, interactive art, dance workshops, film screenings and musical performances. The event was formerly organised and run by Awesome Arts, a non-profit company, but in 2024 Barking Gecko Theatre and Awesome Arts merged into Barking Gecko Arts.
