= Roma Egan =

Australian ballet dancer

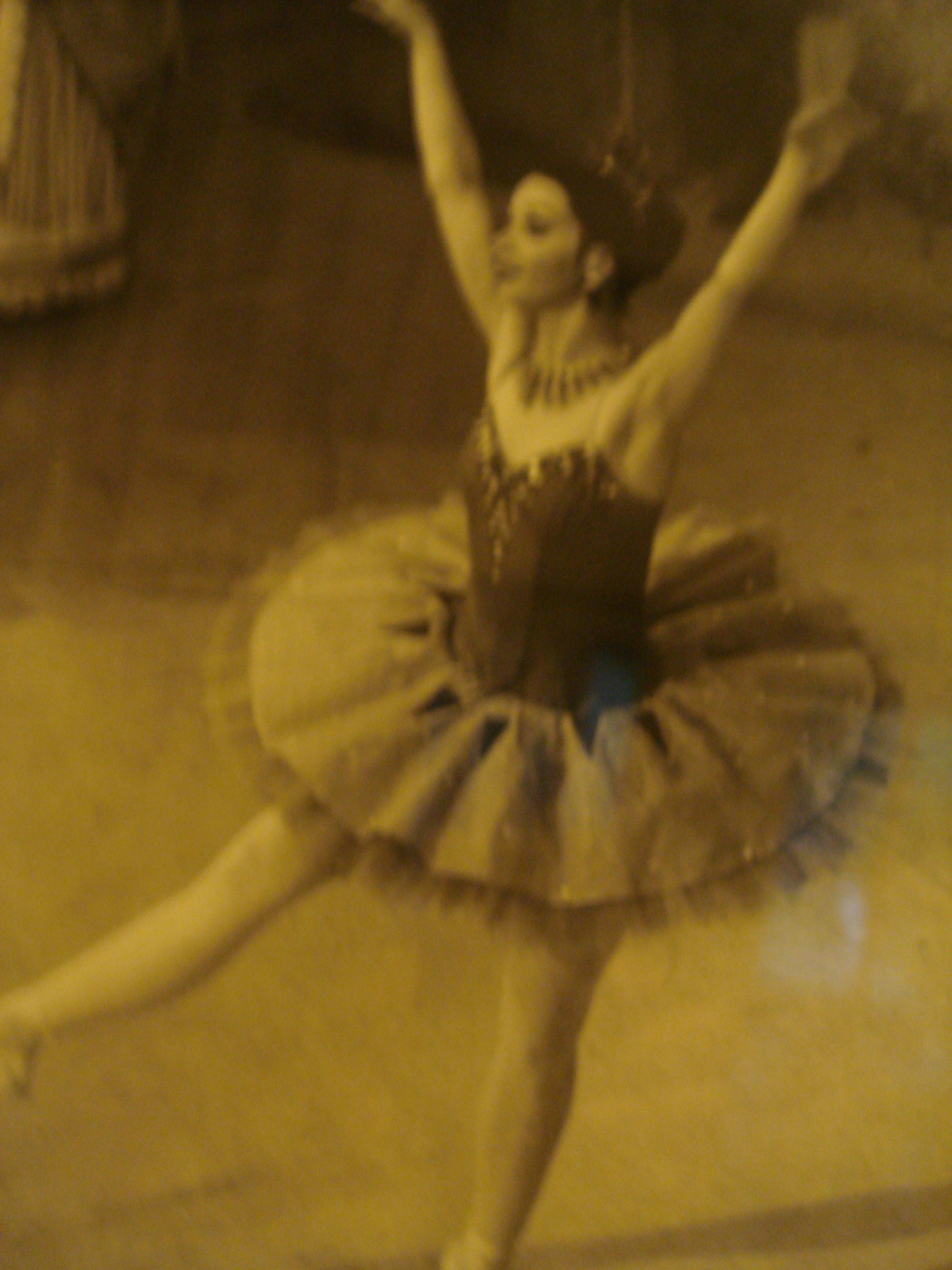
- Roma Egan at a dress rehearsal of Sleeping Beauty in the 1970s.
- Born: Roma Jean Egan; 1948 (age 77–78); Camberwell East, Victoria, Australia
- Occupations: Child actress; ballet dancer; ballet teacher
- Years active: 1956–2011
- Television: Terrific Adventures of the Terrible Ten; In Melbourne Tonight (IMT); Tarax Show

Notes
- Roma Egan is the first cousin of Brian Kavanagh

Roma Jean Egan (born 1948) was a child actress on Australian television, and an Australian ballet dancer and teacher. She was notably a senior soloist for The Australian Ballet, and variously performed for the Queensland Ballet, Basel Ballet, Ballet Victoria and Royal New Zealand Ballet.

== Early life ==
Roma Jean Egan was born in Camberwell East, Victoria. Her primary education was at Hawthorn East State School and Croydon North State School (where she was Dux), and her secondary education was at Box Hill Grammar School and the Methodist Ladies' College (MLC), Melbourne.

When Egan was 6 yrs, she first began ballet cases run by Edith Lynton; a widow whose husband was killed in Borneo in 1945. Lynton had a varied career as a champion Highland dancer, a theatre actress, an announcer, a ballet mistress for the J. C. Williamson Company, and had travelled to England receiving degrees and honours from the British Association of Teachers of Dancing. Lynton was also a judge in the major Eisteddfods in Australia.

Egan carried out her Royal Academy of Dance (RAD) grade exams under Edith Lynton, up to Grade 5 obtaining honours for all of them. Under Lynton's tutelage, Egan also participated in many Victorian Eisteddfods successfully.

== Training ==
Egan signed up with the Bambi Smith Modelling College, and was commissioned for photo modelling in knitting magazines and modelled clothes on catwalks around the ages of 8–10 yrs. The modelling college taught Roma all aspects of modelling from how to walk, deportment, etiquette, and elocution.

Bambi Smith (née Patricia Tuckwell) was married to Athol Shmith who had a famous photography studio in Collins Street. Athol & Bambi divorced in 1957 and Bambi then went onto marry Lord Harewood, a first cousin of Queen Elizabeth II.

After Egan finished her Grade 5 RAD exams, at the age of 11 she then studied under Paul Hammond at the Elementary, Intermediate, Advanced, and Solo Seal levels. Paul Hammond had professionally danced for the Glyndebourne Ballet in the UK and for Edouard Borovansky (founder of the Borovansky Ballet) in Melbourne.

While Egan was studying at the elementary level with Paul Hammond, she also took up acting and appeared on ABC television's Terrific Adventures of the Terrible Ten (Pacific Films) whose studios were behind GTV9 (now called Channel Nine) in Bendigo Street, Richmond. The filming occurred on weekends and the show was directed by Roger Mirams. During the week, on the Tarax Show Egan was part of GTV9 junior ballet, called The Royal Dancers, performing two times a week with a different routine for each show. The Royal Dancers notably also included Denise Drysdale and was directed by Valmai Ennor, a former dancer with the Sadler's Wells Ballet. The junior ballet also screened on In Melbourne Tonight (IMT), starring Bert Newton and Graham Kennedy, also on GTV9. Egan is related on her paternal side to Bert Newton's wife, Patti McGrath.

Pacific Films encouraged Egan to become an actress, however, her heart was more with classical ballet. So she pulled out of GTV9 to focus on ballet. At the age of 15, Egan's father died and these were difficult times. After completing her Intermediate and Leaving Certificates at high school, Egan studied full-time for six months under Paul Hammond, completing her Intermediate (honours) and Advanced RAD (highly commended) examinations.

The Australian Ballet School (ABS) had just begun in 1964, and in 1965 Egan was one of 20 successful applicants nationwide to undertake a 2-yr diploma in dance, under Dame Margaret Scott. The ABS was founded in 1964 to create a homogenous style and exclusively feed new talent into the Australian Ballet (formed 1962).

In December 1965, during the ABS holidays, Roma auditioned at the St. Martin's Theatre, South Yarra, Melbourne, to earn money to help support herself. The theatre accepted her and she played a prominent role in Peter O'Shaughnessy's Mumba Jumba and the Bunyip starring Barry Humphries.

Much later in life, in 1998, Egan graduated with a Master of Fine Arts, majoring in dance psychology, at Queensland University of Technology (QUT).

== Performance career ==
In October 1966, Russell Kerr came to the ABS to audition students for the New Zealand Ballet, and Egan obtained a contract with him. She worked in various productions including Petrushka, and also the ABC filming of Petrushka starring Jonty Trimmer.

Charles Lisner, founder and director of the Queensland Ballet, had for the first time obtained a government grant to engage six full-time dancers. Egan arrived in Brisbane in January 1969 and performed in the opening of Oedipus Rex and Swan Lake at the SGIO Theatre. In the following season Egan performed in Garth Welch's production of Giselle and Welch's ballet called Counterfeit.

In June 1969, Egan auditioned for the Australian Ballet under the directorship of Dame Peggy van Praagh and was admitted in August that year. In the intervening time Egan moved to Adelaide and trained with Joanna Priest in her Childer's Street studio for two months.

Egan was promoted to soloist in late 1971. Graeme Murphy made his first choreographic work, Ecco le Diavole, to music by Nino Rota, presented at Melbourne's Princess Theatre in July 1971, featuring Roslyn Anderson, Roma Egan, Janet Vernon, and Wendy Walker.

In 1972, Egan took leave of absence, for a break, visited the Kiryat Shmona kibbutz, near the Golan Heights, in Israel. In late 1972, Egan went to the London Dance Centre to secure a contract with an international ballet company. She was accepted by the newly formed Basel Ballet, Switzerland, directed by Heinz Spoerli. However, the contract did not start until August 1973, so she danced for Ballet Victoria in the intervening months under the directorship of Laurel Martyn.

In January 1974, Egan rejoined the Australian Ballet, with Dame Peggy van Praagh still at the helm. During this time, Egan was promoted to senior soloist. In 1976, she was awarded a teaching scholarship from the National Theatre, Prague, Czechoslovakia. Roma left for Czechoslovakia to study Russian teaching techniques for seven months; after which she returned to Australia. She rejoined the Australian Ballet, in early 1977, under the directorship of Anne Woolliams.

== Artistic direction and teaching ==
On 8 August 1981, Egan retired from the Australian Ballet, to take up the position as assistant artistic director at the Queensland Ballet. Egan was with the Queensland Ballet for two years, teaching daily classes, rehearsing, coaching, and reproducing ballets from videos. In 1984–1985, Egan was invited to take guest classes for the Sydney Dance Company under the directorship of Graeme Murphy and with the Australian Ballet under the directorship of Maina Gielgud.

In 1986, Egan formed the National Ballet Centre in Wooloowin, Brisbane, located in the Heritage Hall. The Centre offered ballet from the ages of three (Kinderballet) to about 20-yrs (Advanced Classical); in some cases with students training the whole 17-years from the pre-school through to their university years. This included choreographing for each end of year performance and developing a Vaganova-based syllabus. The choreographer Fiona Bryant was trained by Egan.
