= Joan Gadsdon =

Australian ballet dancer, actor and artist

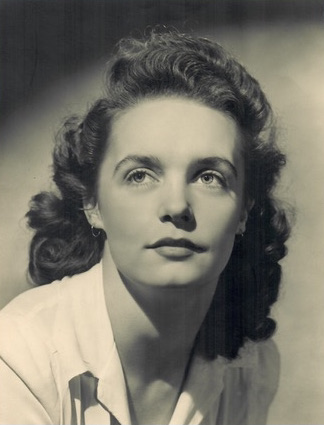
- Born: 23 April 1923; Lithgow, New South Wales, Australia
- Died: 12 October 2003 (aged 80); London, England
- Occupations: dancer, actor, artist
- Years active: 1942–1990

Joan Margaret Anne Gadsdon (23 April 1923 – 12 October 2003) was an Australian ballet dancer, actor and artist. She was one of the pioneers of early Australian ballet in the 1940s, performing with the newly established Kirsova and Borovansky ballet companies. After emigrating to Great Britain she achieved minor theatrical fame in 1953 in London by stepping in at the last moment to save the famous British stage musical The Boy Friend from almost certain oblivion. She continued to appear to some acclaim in the show in its West End run before retiring from the stage in 1959.

== Early life ==
Joan Gadsdon was born in Lithgow, New South Wales, Australia on 23 April 1923, the second of four children of James Boswell Gadsdon, a steelworker, and his wife Josephine Elizabeth Gadsdon née Fairhall. The family was working class and often poor.

On leaving school with no qualifications at the age of 12, she was increasingly ambitious to train to be both an artist and a dancer, but filled time with a succession of low-paid jobs. She was 14 when the family moved to Sydney. She then began dance training at the studio of Mischa Burlakov, a Ukrainian who had once worked with the Pavlova Ballet Company. Gadsdon later maintained that the standard of Burlakov's training was low, but through the studio she made her first theatre appearance in two solos in a one-night ballet performance at the Sydney Conservatorium of Music in December 1941 as well as appearing in a number of weekly cabaret shows. She was not paid for this work.

To earn money, Gadsdon worked as retoucher of negative plates in a photographer's studio. At the same time, as well as her ballet classes, she began training at the art studio of Hayward Veal, where, showing much natural talent, she learned to paint portraiture and still-life.

In 1942 she attended a performance of the Kirsova Ballet at the Minerva Theatre, Sydney and was transfixed. "The curtain went up," she later recorded, "and the dancers moved downstage, their fluffy white dresses bathed in a soft blue light. I wanted to be like them." Gadsdon auditioned for the company and was accepted.

== Australian ballet ==
The Kirsova Ballet was established in Sydney in 1941 by Hélène Kirsova, a founding member of the Ballets Russes de Monte-Carlo, as the first professional ballet company in Australia. Gadsdon started with the company, in the corps de ballet, in 1942 at the age of 19. As well as dancing in the corps she performed occasionally as a minor principal. In doing so she became one of the pioneers of Australian ballet, playing an important role in exposing Australians to the art form, along with Kirsova's leading principal dancers Rachel Cameron, Strelsa Heckleman, Peggy Sager and Paul Hammond. She stayed with the company for about 18 months as it toured Australia.

In 1944 the Kirsova company folded due to war-time financial constraints. With most of her fellow-dancers from the Kirsova company, Gadsdon joined the Borovansky Ballet company in August 1944. Founded by Czech-born Edouard Borovansky, this company eventually became the first national Australian ballet company, The Australian Ballet. Gadsdon performed with the company in Melbourne and Brisbane, and then on a six-month tour of New Zealand. The repertoire included Giselle, Swan Lake, Les Sylphides, En Saga, Capriccio Italien, Frederick Ashton's Façade, and Borovansky's symphonic fantasy, Vltava. In 1945, the company toured mainland Australia again with dates in Adelaide, Perth, Hobart and Sydney. This tour included an 8-month season in Melbourne featuring Le Carnaval, Schéhérazade and Le Beau Danube – as well as a new work by Borovansky, Terra Australis. Two musicals, The Dancing Years and Gay Rosalinda together with a number of short ballet seasons followed in Sydney and Melbourne.

Seeking to advance her dancing career, Gadsdon left the Borovansky Ballet in October 1947 and sailed to England.

== England ==
Gadsdon arrived in England towards the end of December 1947. By her own account, she was ill-prepared for a new life in Great Britain. "I was a semi-trained dancer with no qualifications for teaching. I was a painter with insufficient training for teaching. I could type, but not to a professional standard. I knew nothing about England, a country still on its knees after six years of war, I knew nothing about the English theatre and I had no influential friends in London. There were not many points in my favour."

== European ballet ==
In London Gadsdon joined Mona Inglesby’s International Ballet, recognised as Britain's largest classical touring company. Soon after she joined, the company went on a five-month tour of the Midlands and Northern Ireland, playing the stages of large cinemas as well as conventional theatres, on a weekly basis, to regularly full houses. The repertoire included Masque of Comus, The Sleeping Beauty and Swan Lake. Performances in and around London followed.

In April 1949, Gadsdon left the International Ballet to join the short-lived Metropolitan Ballet for a season at the Earls Court Arena which included Le Beau Danube choreographed by Léonide Massine.

In June 1949, Gadsdon travelled to Paris to join the Original Ballet Russe which was being restarted by Colonel Wassily de Basil, but though rehearsals began the company did not become a performing reality. She moved on to Barcelona where she joined a ballet company formed by the choreographer Nina Verchinina which went on a five-week tour of northern Spain, visiting Bilbao, Santander, Burgos, Valladolid, Gijón, Avilés, Oviedo, Benavente, Salamanca and Palencia, but at the end of the tour this company, too, closed, and Gadsdon returned penniless to London in November 1949.

== Cabaret, variety and film ==
Gadsdon then formed a dance partnership with a Russian dancer. The work was a combination of ballroom dancing and complicated acrobatic lifts, some of them quite dangerous. In March 1950 the act went on a tour of US army bases in West Germany. A tour of India followed.

Back in England in 1951 Gadsdon worked on the film Where's Charley? at Teddington Studios in which her dance partner was John Heawood, who was to become an important influence on her career. Work on another film, The Crimson Pirate, followed, also filmed at Teddington Studios.

John Heawood then introduced Gadsdon to The Players' Theatre, a Victorian pastiche music hall in London's West End. Here she appeared in their 1951 Christmas pantomime and in a number of music hall bills over the first few months of 1952.

She then formed another dance act, this time with an Australian, appearing in 1952 as Anton and Yolette in successful seasons at Edmundo Ros' Coconut Grove club in London and long summer shows in Glasgow and Edinburgh before the duo amicably broke up.

December 1952 through to March 1953 saw Gadsdon in pantomime in Sheffield with the double act Morecambe and Wise.

== The Boy Friend ==
Gadsdon was out of work in April 1953 when she received a late-night telephone call from her dancer/choreographer friend John Heawood. The Players' Theatre had commissioned the English composer, lyricist and dramatist Sandy Wilson to write a 1920s pastiche musical to be performed for a three-week season. The show was to be called The Boy Friend. During the final dress rehearsal the leading lady collapsed and was taken to hospital. Her understudy took over the part but there was no-one to take on the role previously being played by the understudy at the following night's first performance before an audience.

Heawood, who was choreographing the show, asked Gadsdon if she could be at the Players' Theatre early the following morning for dress fittings, and then learn the dialogue, stage moves, dances, music and lyrics during the day and appear in the opening performance before an invited audience the same night. Gadsdon later recalled that her reply was "When in doubt, say yes". She learned the part of Fay in the few hours left before the opening. She wrote later that that day was "one of the most difficult days of my life".

Though that first performance had a "meagre and unresponsive audience" it all went smoothly and as Sandy Wilson recalled, Gadsdon was "instrumental in saving The Boy Friend from closing before it ever opened." Another obituarist noted that in taking over the part at such short notice "she earned a small but significant place in the history of musical theatre".

The subsequent opening night was a huge success and in her speech from the stage at the end, the director, Vida Hope, congratulated Gadsdon. "Joan Gadsdon walked into this theatre yesterday morning, knowing nothing of the production, and tonight has given a faultless performance." The audience gave a "tremendous roar of approval", reported Sandy Wilson.

After the short successful run at the Players' Theatre, Gadsdon appeared in two revues. The first was at the New Lindsey Theatre and entitled In The Lap of the Gods. Others in the cast were Fenella Fielding, Gillian Lynne and Richard Waring. The second, The Domino Revue, was staged at the New Wimbledon Theatre. Other performers included Evelyn Laye, Miriam Karlin and Ron Moody.

In October 1953 The Boy Friend reappeared, improved and extended, with a new dance number especially choreographed for Gadsdon. The show opened again at the Players' Theatre and then moved to the Embassy Theatre at Swiss Cottage in London on 1 December. This new version attracted the attention of theatre owners and producers, and it opened in the West End at Wyndham's Theatre on 14 January 1954. It proved to be a notable, long-running success, ultimately being at the time the third-longest running musical in West End history. Gadsdon played two parts: Fay, one of a quartet of lively girl pupils at Mme Dubonnet's Finishing School in Nice, France, and Lolita, a "Speciality Dancer" who performed a preposterous tango with Pépé (played by Stephen Warwick). Gadsdon and Warwick, playing a "mutually antipathetic couple", delighted the West End audience every night with their dance number and frequently "stopped" the show.

Gadsdon stayed with The Boy Friend for three-and-a-half years. She also doubled as ballet mistress, taking over rehearsals when John Heawood went to Broadway with the show, and teaching new understudies. But by the summer of 1957 she was exhausted and at nearly 35 felt her working life as a dancer was coming to an end. She left the show on 31 August, though for a period she returned to act as an understudy through the major influenza pandemic of that year.

== Television ==
Almost immediately Gadsdon took the leading female role of Connie Marshall in the television play, Knife in the Family by Jon Cleary. It was transmitted on the Independent Television network as the ITV Play of the Week on 11 September 1957.

== Irma La Douce ==
Still recovering from the exhaustion of The Boy Friend, Gadsdon took on the role of understudy to Elizabeth Seal in the French musical Irma La Douce. This new show toured for a few weeks before opening for a three-year run in the West End on 17 July 1958.

However, within 18 months, Gadsdon, with some relief, accepted an invitation from a male admirer (who, though married, became her partner) which would enable her to retire comfortably from the stage. She left Irma La Douce in November 1959 having never once played the part of Irma.

== Later life ==
The life of a theatrical "gypsy" had not prepared Gadsdon for that of a wealthy woman-about-Mayfair. For some years she lived a life of extreme comfort but eventually grew tired of it and in 1972 she opted for a single life again and found a large studio in Notting Hill in West London where she pursued a precarious living of part-time jobs. She took up painting again, producing many accomplished portraits of mainly theatrical personalities, and teaching. She continued to pursue an interest in her family genealogy which had started in her years in Mayfair. She also began creative writing, though with little reward.

Gadsdon made one more return to the West End stage in 1990 when a Sunday night performance of The Boy Friend was staged at the Duchess Theatre with most of the original cast. A review reported that "Joan Gadsdon and Stephen Warwick danced the Carnival Tango with as much sinuous camp as ever". In her unpublished autobiography, Gadsdon wrote: "As we stood holding hands and singing the final chorus of the song I felt unbelievably sad. We waved goodbye to the audience, the curtain came down and my little moment of glory was over. I had loved every minute of it.

Though living in Britain from 1948 to 2003, Gadsdon did not apply for British citizenship and kept her Australian citizenship until her death.

While undergoing a series of strokes, Gadsdon benefited from periods of respite care at the actors' care home Denville Hall in West London. She died in St Mary's Hospital in London on 12 October 2003. She was 80. She was cremated at Kensal Green Crematorium. Her ashes were then taken to Australia and interred next to her mother's grave in Lithgow General Cemetery.

Gadsdon's papers, including her unpublished autobiography, were deposited variously in the National Library of Australia and the Department of Theatre and Performance at the Victoria and Albert Museum in London (where cataloguing work is still in progress).
