= Margaret Scott (dancer) =

Australian ballerina

Dame Margaret Scott DBE, AC
- Margaret Scott performing in ballet Les Sylphides in 1949, at the Princess Theater in Melbourne, Australia
- Born: Catherine Margaret Mary Scott; 26 April 1922; Johannesburg, South Africa
- Died: 24 February 2019 (aged 96); Melbourne, Victoria, Australia
- Occupations: Dancer, choreographer
- Years active: 1939–2000
- Spouse: Derek Denton (m. 1953)

Dame Catherine Margaret Mary Scott, DBE, AC (26 April 1922 – 24 February 2019) was a South African-born pioneering ballet dancer who found fame as a teacher, choreographer, and school administrator in Australia. After having worked in England with the Sadler's Wells Ballet, she came to Australia to serve as the first director of the Australian Ballet School, she is recognised as one of the founders of the strong ballet tradition of her adopted country.

== Early life and training ==
Margaret Scott was born in Johannesburg, South Africa, the youngest of three, including twins Joan and Barbara. As a child, she was encouraged by her free-spirited family to pursue her interest in dance, which had developed early in her childhood. Throughout her youth, she attended ballet classes at the Conmee School of Dancing, where, under the direction of London-trained Ivy Conmee, instruction was given according to the syllabus of the Royal Academy of Dancing. On graduation from the Parktown Convent School, Scott went with her mother to London in 1939, when she was 17, and auditioned successfully for entrance to the Sadler's Wells Ballet School. There she polished her classical technique under the demanding tutelage of Dame Ninette de Valois and a faculty of renowned teachers.

== Dancing in England ==
Despite the outbreak of war with Germany in September 1939, soon after her arrival in England, Scott decided to remain in London and continue her dance training. After some months at the Sadler's Wells school, she joined the Sadler's Wells Ballet and began her professional career. She stayed with the company only a year. Attracted by the more adventurous repertory of Ballet Rambert, she applied to Marie Rambert and was engaged as a soloist with her company.

Promoted to principal dancer in 1943, Scott spent five more years with Ballet Rambert, dancing leading and supporting roles in the repertory, including audience favourites such as Michel Fokine's Les Sylphides and Antony Tudor's Jardin aux Lilas as well as new works by Andrée Howard, Frank Staff, and Walter Gore. The war years were difficult ones for the Rambert company, but it began to recover its strength and popularity after the war. In 1947, Ballet Rambert toured Australia, under the auspices of D. D. O'Connor and the British Council. The company's highly successful tour was extended several times until eighteen months had been spent away from home. When the tour ended, some dancers, including Scott and Sally Gilmour, chose to remain in Australia.

== Dancing in Australia ==
In 1949, Scott was a founding member of Gertrude Johnson's National Theatre Ballet, based in Melbourne and directed by Joyce Graeme, a former principal dancer with Ballet Rambert. During the Christmas season of 1949, Scott appeared in a featured role in The Glass Slipper, a retelling of the Cinderella story, and early in 1950 she danced the barefoot role of the Thipa Thipa Bird in Corroboree, choreographed by Rex Reid to music by John Antill. Later that year she restaged Frank Staff's charming Peter and the Wolf, which he had created in 1940 for Ballet Rambert. In 1951, she tried her hand at original choreography, setting Apollon Musagète to the Igor Stravinsky score for Laurel Martyn's Victorian Ballet Guild. She returned to London in 1952 and was one of six dancers invited by John Cranko to perform his works at the Kenton Theatre in Henley-on-Thames and at the Aldeburgh Festival. She then rejoined the Rambert company as ballet mistress and assistant to Madam Rambert, in which roles she was responsible for directing the company on tour.

== Teaching in Australia ==
In March 1953, Scott married Derek Denton, an Australian medical doctor and researcher, and subsequently returned with him to Australia. For the next two years she taught classes and managed the school of Paul Hammond and his wife Peggy Sager while they were on tour with the Borovansky Ballet. She then opened her own school in a church hall in Toorak, a prestigious suburb of Melbourne. In the late 1950s, she participated in negotiations with the Australian Elizabethan Theatre Trust that led to the formation of the Australian Ballet in 1962 under the direction of Peggy van Praagh.

Scott then undertook planning for the foundation of the Australian Ballet School, which was realised in 1964. Appointed by Van Praagh as the first director of the school, she remained in this post for 26 years, until she retired in 1990. Pamela Ruskin notes that her long tenure, she exerted a powerful influence on the development of the school and its students, many of whom became remarkable dancers, choreographers, directors, and teachers, including Marilyn Rowe, celebrated ballerina and former director of the Australian Ballet School, and Graeme Murphy, former director of the Sydney Dance Company and internationally known choreographer.

== Related activities ==
During her years as director and administrator of the Australian Ballet School, Scott also choreographed several ballets, notably Recollections of a Beloved Place, set to music by Tchaikovsky, for Ballet Victoria in 1975. She expanded her activities in the performing arts as representative of Australia on the Council of the World Dance Alliance, as a jurist at international ballet competitions in Moscow, and as leader of a group of teachers at ballet companies in Beijing and Shanghai. During the 1990s, Dame Margaret returned to the stage on a number of occasions. In 1990, she danced as Aunt Sophy in a gala performance of The Nutcracker, produced in her honour by Robert Ray, and she showed herself to be a talented actress in a non-dancing role in the play In the Body of the Son by Nicholas Rowe, presented at the Darwin Festival in 1995. Her greatest triumph, however, came in 1992, when, at the age of 70, she appeared as Clara the Elder in Nutcracker: The Story of Clara, Graeme Murphy's imaginative reinterpretation of the Christmas classic. She repeated the role during the 1994 and 2000 seasons of the Australian Ballet.

== Personal life ==
Scott met Derek Denton, a doctor at the Royal Melbourne Hospital, in 1947, when she and her friend Sally Gilmour went there to deliver flowers received after the triumphant opening night of Ballet Rambert. They married in 1953 and had two sons. Denton founded the Florey Institute of Neuroscience and Mental Health. After their marriage, he continued to publish his research into the nature of consciousness in animals, and she remained actively engaged in the dance world. Late in life, she established the Dame Margaret Scott Fund for Choreography, which assisted the creation of Alexei Ratmansky's surrealistic Cinderella, an outstanding success that played to sold-out houses in Sydney, Melbourne, and Adelaide in 2013 and 2014. She also had significant input into the choreographic initiatives of the Australian Institute of Classical Dance. She is the subject of a biography by Michelle Potter, Dame Maggie Scott: A Life in Dance (2014).

Scott died, aged 96, in Melbourne on 24 February 2019.

== Honours and awards ==
Scott was appointed an Officer of the Order of the British Empire (OBE) in 1976, Dame Commander (DBE) in the 1981 Birthday Honours, and Companion of the Order of Australia (AC) in 2005.

She was the recipient of many other honours and awards, including an honorary Doctor of Laws degree from the University of Melbourne in 1989 and an award for lifetime achievement at the Australian Dance Awards in 1998.

Over the years, Scott had been a part-time student of teaching methods at the Royal Melbourne Institute of Technology (RMIT), where she eventually gained a graduate diploma in visual and performing arts in 2000.

She was granted an honorary degree of Doctor of Education from her alma mater in 2001 and was inducted onto the Victorian Honour Roll of Women in the same year.

=== Helpmann Awards ===
The Helpmann Awards is an awards show, celebrating live entertainment and performing arts in Australia, presented by industry group Live Performance Australia (LPA) since 2001. In 2007, Scott received the JC Williamson Award, the LPA's highest honour, for their life's work in live performance.

Year	Nominee / work	Award	Result
2007	Herself	JC Williamson Award	awarded
