= Australian Archives of the Dance =

Specialist dance archive

Coordinates: 37°49′13″S 144°58′6″E

The Australian Archives of the Dance (also known as the Australian Dance Archives) is a specialist archive documenting Australian dance history. It was stablished in 1972 at the initiative of Dame Peggy van Praagh, the inaugural artistic director of The Australian Ballet, and transferred to the Performing Arts Collection of the Melbourne Arts Centre in 1998.

== Collection ==
The Archives include over 50,000 items covering the breadth of Australia’s dance history, with particular reference to the main Melbourne-based ballet companies: the Borovansky Ballet, the Victorian Ballet Guild / Ballet Victoria, the National Theatre Ballet and The Australian Ballet. The Archives include costumes, costume elements, costume and set designs, lighting plans, props, business records, correspondence, photographs, albums, scrapbooks, programs, personality files, and newspaper clippings.

Material relating to The Australian Ballet within the Archives is largely in the form of personality and, to a lesser extent, performance photographs, programs, and scrapbooks. The personality photographs are notable for their extensive coverage of principal dancers (e.g. Garth Welch, Kathleen Gorham, Kathleen Geldard, Kelvin Coe) and guest dancers (e.g. Margot Fonteyn and Rudolf Nureyev) who performed with the major Australian ballet companies.

=== Formed Collections ===
The Archives include a number of subsidiary formed personality collections, donated by their creators, these include:

- the Peggy van Praagh Collection
- the Joyce Graeme Collection
- the Laurel Martyn Collection
- the Rex Smith Collection

=== Composite Collections ===
The Archives hold important composite collections built up from a number of donations relating to:

- the three Australian tours of Wassily de Basil’s Ballets Russes companies (1936-1940)
- the Australian tours of Anna Pavlova (1926, 1929)
