= Ludmilla Chiriaeff =

Latvian-Canadian ballet dancer, choreographer, teacher and company director

- Born: January 10, 1924; Riga, Latvia
- Died: September 22, 1996 (aged 72); Montreal, Quebec, Canada
- Career
- Dances: Ballet

Ludmilla Chiriaeff CC GOQ (January 10, 1924 – September 22, 1996) was a Russian-Canadian ballet dancer, choreographer, teacher, and company director.

== Biography ==
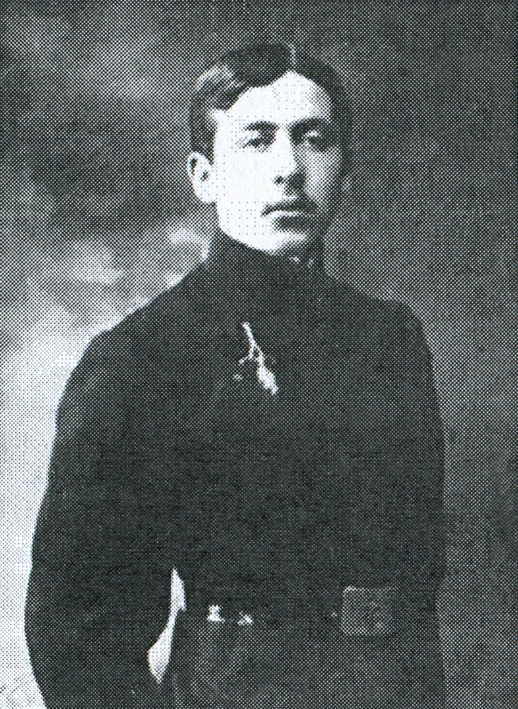
Otsup's father Nikolaï (1913)

Ludmilla Alexandrovna Otsup was born in Riga to a Russian-Jewish father Alexandr Otsup, a writer known under the pen name Sergej Gorny, and his wife Ekaterina Otsup (née Abramova) of Polish descent.

She considered herself Russian by birth, as her parents were in Latvia only as refugees from conflict in Russia. She was raised and trained in Berlin, where she studied with Alexandra Nikolaeva, a former ballerina of the Bolshoi Ballet, with Nikolaeva's daughter and son-in-law Xenia Krüger and Edouard Borovansky, and, later, with Eugenie Eduardowa.

Her career was interrupted by the conflict of World War II, during which she was confined to a Nazi labor camp on suspicion of Jewish ancestry. She escaped during a bombing raid and, with the assistance of the Red Cross, made her way to Switzerland, where she was able to resume her ballet training and revive her professional career in Lausanne and Geneva.

While resident in the Suisse romande, she married the Russian artist Alexis Shiriaev, whose surname was spelled Chiriaeff, in the French style.

After immigrating with her family to Canada in 1952, Chiriaeff settled in Montreal, Québec, opened a ballet school, and soon began to create dances for Société Radio-Canada, the French-language public television service. Because of the success of her television appearances, she founded Les Ballets Chiriaeff, a small troupe that grew in size and popularity and eventually evolved into Les Grands Ballets Canadiens, in 1957.

Under her guidance, shared jointly with choreographer Fernand Nault, this company achieved international prominence in 1966–67, during Canada's Expo 67 World Festival and subsequent tours of the United States and western Europe. Chiriaeff retired as co-artistic director of the company in 1974 and devoted herself to leadership of the company's associated schools.

== Choreographies ==
Chiriaeff created more than three hundred ballets for television and stage. In 1952, she choreographed Cendrillon (Cinderella), a three-act ballet set to music by Mozart, for the nascent French-language television service of the Canadian Broadcasting Corporation. The success of this work led to her being offered a half-hour slot every month to create ballets for L'Heure du Concert (The Concert Hour) and other programs of music and dance broadcast bilingually across Canada. Among her subsequent works for television were Jeu de Cartes (Card Game, 1954), set to music by Igor Stravinsky, Une Nuit sur le Mont Chauve (Night on Bald Mountain), to music by Modest Mussorgsky, and Carnaval des Animaux (Carnival of Animals, 1957), to music by Camille Saint-Saëns.

After the formation of Les Grands Ballets Canadiens in 1957, Chiriaeff created many works for her young company, including Mémoires de Camille (1961), to music by Giuseppe Verdi, Quatrième Concert Royal (1961), to music by François Couperin, and Fète Hongroise, to music by Johannes Brahms. She also restaged some of her earlier works, including Cendrillon (1962) and Suite Canadienne (1961), set to French-Canadian folk tunes arranged by Michel Perrault. Created for a gala television performance during Queen Elizabeth II's 1955 tour of Canada. Suite Canadienne was one of Chiriaeff's several ballets celebrating Québécois culture. It became, for a time, a sort of signature work for Les Grands Ballets Canadiens and proved to be one of her most popular creations.

== Educational vision and mission ==
In response to her contractual commitment to the Canadian Broadcasting Corporation, Chiriaeff founded Les Ballets Chiriaeff and an associated school in 1952. When the company was renamed Les Grands Ballets Canadiens in 1957, the school expanded, offering instruction to both amateurs and aspiring professionals. In 1966, at the request of the Ministère des Affaires Culturelles du Québec, Madame Chiriaeff established the first fully professional ballet school in the province, the Académie des Grands Ballets Canadiens, which in 1976 became the École Supérieure de Danse des Grands Ballets Canadiens. In 1980, the school obtained an independent charter and became the École Supérieure de Danse du Québec. It continued to operate under that name until 2010, when it was designated the École Supérieure de Ballet du Québec. It is the only institution in North America to provide a professional ballet program taught entirely in French.

Training dancers and dance instructors was central to Chiriaeff's vision. In addition to founding her own schools, she introduced intensive ballet programs into all levels of the provincial educational system, including Montréal's Pierre Laporte Secondary School (1975), the CÉGEP du Vieux Montréal (College of General and Vocational Education in Old Montreal, 1979), and the École Laurier for elementary school children (1998). As a result of her educational vision and mission, she has been acknowledged as "la mère de la danse au Québec" ("the mother of dance in Quebec").

== Awards and honors ==
In 1969 Chiriaeff was made an Officer of the Order of Canada and was promoted to Companion in 1984. In 1978 she was proclaimed a Grande Montréalaise by the City of Montreal, and in 1985 she was made a Grand Officier de l'Ordre National du Québec. In 1993, she received Canada's highest honour in the performing arts, the Governor General's Performing Arts Award, the Denise Pelletier Award for the Performing Arts, and honorary doctorates from McGill University, the Université de Montréal, and the Université du Québec. In 2022, Chiriaeff was declared a historic personage in Quebec.
