= Xenia Borovansky =

Russian-born dancer and choreographer

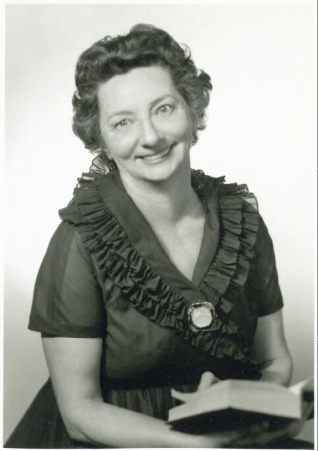
Xenia Borovansky, in the 1940s.

Xenia Nikolaeva Smirnova Krüger Borovansky (August 10, 1903 — November 25, 1985) was a Russian-born dancer and choreographer, based in Australia after 1939. She was principal teacher at the Melbourne Academy of Russian Ballet, and active in running the Borovansky Ballet.

== Early life ==
Xenia Nikolaeva Smirnova was born in Moscow. Her mother Aleksandra Adrianovna Smirnova (née Nikolaeva) was a dancer; her father Nikolay Vasilyevich Smirnov was a military officer. She had a brother Vladimir. She trained in ballet at the Bolshoi Ballet. In the early 1920s, Xenia emigrated with her family from Rostov, Russia to Berlin, Germany. It was in Berlin that Xenia met Edouard Borovansky.

== Career ==
Xenia Borovansky danced with her aunt, Anna Pavlova, and taught with her mother in Europe before she moved to Australia with her husband during the Covent Garden Russian Ballet tour in 1938–1939. They stayed in Melbourne, and started a ballet school and dance company there. Xenia Borovansky was the head teacher at the school. She also choreographed original pieces, and designed costumes for her school's productions. "I haven't any children, but a very large family of little boys and girls," she said of her students in 1955. Her students included Ludmilla Chiriaeff (in Berlin), Marilyn Jones, and Charles Lisner.

Later in life, she helped form the Borovansky Memorial Australian Academy of Dancing, an examination board for Australian ballet dancers, and worked with Agnes Babicheva on creating the Association of Teachers of the Russian Method of Ballet. Borovansky's syllabus continue in use at the Australian Institute of Classical Dance.

== Personal life ==
Xenia Smirnova married twice. Her first marriage to a man named Krüger ended in divorce. She married Czech-born dancer Edouard Borovansky in 1933, in London. She became a British citizen in Australia in 1945. She was a widow after Edouard died in 1959. Xenia Borovansky died in 1985, in Melbourne, aged 82 years. Her papers are in the Xenia Borovansky collection, Geoffrey Ingram Archive of Australian Ballet, at the National Library of Australia.
