= Michelle Potter =

Dancer, choreographer and dance critic

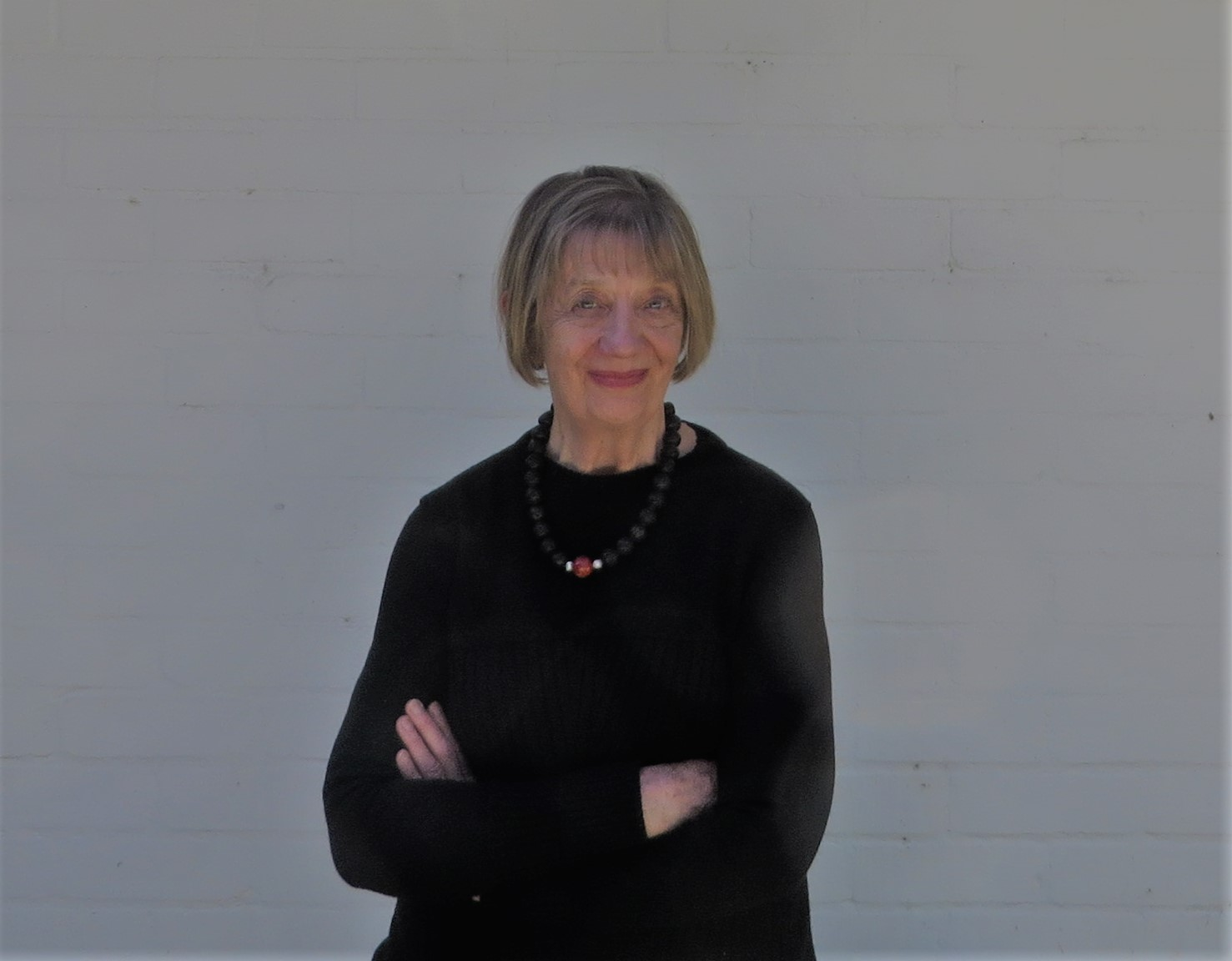
Michelle Potter outside her home in Canberra, Australia

Michelle Anne Potter AM (born 1944) is an Australian dance writer, critic, archivist, and curator of historical materials. Her research and writing have focused on but have not been restricted to Australian dance history. She was honoured for her achievements with the award of Member of the Order of Australia (AM) in the 2023 Australia Day Honours list.

== Early life and education ==
Born in Sydney in 1944, Michelle Anne Potter became interested in dance in her youth, after seeing a performance by the Borovansky Ballet. She began her dance training with Joan and Monica Halliday in her hometown, then went on for further study with jazz dancer and teacher Ronne Arnold and Valrene Tweedie, a pioneer in Australia of the Cecchetti method of ballet training. She also studied acting and theatre techniques at the Mina Shelley School of the Theatre in Sydney, a well-known school for professional performers. Having become an accomplished dancer by the time she was 15, she determined to get an early start in her theatrical career.

She earned a bachelor's degree with honours in social anthropology, and a diploma in education from the University of Sydney in the early 1970s.

In the 1980s she earned a second undergraduate degree with honours in art history, and later a doctorate in art history and dance history at the Australian National University (ANU).

== Career ==
=== Dancer and choreographer ===
In 1959 she performed in a Christmas pantomime directed by Maurice Sullivan and Mina Shelley, and continued to work in their shows for some years. In the mid-1960s she worked with Ballet Australia in both major productions and in choreographic workshops.

In the 1970s and 1980s, after earning her degree and teaching diploma from Sydney University, Potter moved to Canberra and taught at the National Capital Ballet School. During these years, she tried her hand at choreography, creating Court Serenade (1975), to music by Delibes, for the ballet school dancers; Orpheus and Eurydice (1977), to music by Gluck, for Canberra Opera; and Morning Prayer (1978) for St. James Church in Curtin, A.C.T. She also appeared in several productions by the National Capital Dancers, including The Nutcracker and Giselle.

=== Historian and filmmaker ===
In the 1980s Potter received an art history undergraduate degree and PhD at ANU.

From 1988 to 1990 she was Esso Fellow in the Performing Arts at the National Library of Australia, and in 1989 was Janet Wilkie Memorial Scholar at ANU, which was a travel scholarship to New York City, where she undertook research.

The focus of her research over the years has ranged from the history of the Wassily de Basil's Ballets Russes in Australia, with particular emphasis on the designers of sets and costumes, to contemporary masters such as Merce Cunningham, whose work with John Cage, Robert Rauschenberg, and Jasper Johns was the subject of her doctoral dissertation. She has also done intensive study on Robert Helpmann and on Pina Bausch.

In 1996, Potter curated the National Library of Australia's touring exhibition Dance People Dance. From 1997 until 2001, she managed the "Keep Dancing!" project at the National Film and Sound Archive. As part of that project, she co-scripted, researched, and produced two video documentaries and a film:

- 1999: An Avalanche of Dancing: The Ballets Russes in Australia, 1936-1940, a documentary drawing on archival film footage of the Ballets Russes tours to Australia, filmed between 1936 and 1940
- 2001: Boro's Ballet: The Making of an Australian Ballet, 1939-1961, about Czech-Australian Edouard Borovansky and his dream of establishing an Australian ballet company
- 2002: The Australian Ballet: Opening Act, 1962-1972, which documents the early days of The Australian Ballet

=== Writer and critic ===
Potter has been writing about dance since 1990. Her articles and reviews have been published in a variety of journals, magazines, programs, and newspapers in Australia, the UK, the US and Germany, and her work has also been published as chapters in many anthologies and catalogs.

She is the founder of two notable media dedicated to dissemination of information about dance history and current performances. In 1994, she founded Brolga: An Australian Journal about Dance and continued to edit it until mid-2006. A few years later, in 2009, she established a personal website, Michelle Potter ... on dancing, as an additional outlet for her writing and reviews.

=== Curator ===
In 2002, Potter was appointed inaugural curator of dance at the National Library of Australia. In this post she recorded over one hundred oral history interviews with eminent Australians working in the arts. She was also one of the original team of investigators for the research project Ballets Russes in Australia: Our Cultural Revolution, a four-year collaborative partnership of the Australian Ballet, the University of Adelaide, and the National Library of Australia, which began in 2005.

In 2006, Potter left the NLA to move to the United States and take up an appointment as curator of the Jerome Robbins Dance Division of the New York Public Library for the Performing Arts at Lincoln Center, a position she held until 2008. During this appointment, she co-curated Invention: Merce Cunningham and Collaborators, a major retrospective exhibition for the New York Public Library in June 2007.

Since returning to Australia in 2008 Potter has worked as an independent dance writer and critic.

== Awards ==
Potter was made a Member of the Order of Australia (AM) in the 2023 Australia Day Honours List.

In addition she is the recipient of two Australian Dance awards: Outstanding Achievement in Dance on Film (2001) and Services to Dance (2003). She shared the award for achievement in dance on film with Sally Jackson, with whom she had collaborated on the video documentary Boro's Ballet.

She has also won an International Dance Day Award (1996), a Canberra Critics' Circle Award (1997), and two Australian Cultural Studies Awards (1998 and 2000).

== Bibliography ==
=== Books ===
- Potter, Michelle (1991). A full house : the Esso guide to the performing arts collections of the National Library of Australia. With an introduction by Robyn Archer. Canberra: National Library of Australia.
- — (1997). A passion for dance. Canberra: National Library of Australia.
- — (2002). A collector's book of Australian dance. Canberra: National Library of Australia.
- — (2012). Meryl Tankard : an original voice. Canberra: Dance Writing and Research.
- — (2014). Dame Maggie Scott : a life in dance. Foreword by Graeme Murphy. Melbourne: Text Publishing Co.
- 2020. Kristian Fredrikson. Designer. With a foreword by Maina Gielgud. Melbourne: Melbourne Books
- 2022. Glimpses of Graeme. Reflections on the work of Graeme Murphy. Hobart: FortySouth Publishing

=== Essays and reporting ===
- Potter, Michelle (1990). "Designed for dance : the costumes of Leon Bakst and the art of Isadora Duncan". Dance Chronicle. 13 (2): 154–169.
- — (October 2001). "Giving a voice to dance". National Library of Australia News. XII (1): 14–16.
- — (March 2002). "Lifeblood : Don Asker and the Human Veins Dance Theatre". National Library of Australia News. XII (6): 12–15.
- — (April 2002). "The Armidale Summer Schools". National Library of Australia News. XII (7): 15–18.
- — (December 2010). "Oceanic accomplishments in choreography". The National Library Magazine. 2 (4): 18–22. (Note: Meryl Tankard's choreography.)
- — (December 2011). "Australians abroad : ballet designs by Sidney Nolan and Arthur Boyd". The National Library Magazine. 3 (4): 21–23.

———————

Bibliography notes
