= Joanna Priest =

Australian ballerina and choreographer (1910–1997)

Joanna ('Joanne') Priest OBE (1910–1997) was born in Adelaide and was a major figure in the development of dance in Australia.

She influenced the theatre designer, Kenneth Rowell, and her students that rose to have major careers in dance include Stephen Baynes, Jacqui Carroll, Rosetta Cook, Roma Egan, Lisa Heaven, Josephine Jason, John Nobbs, Paul Saliba and Wendy Walker.

She received her first dance training in Perth from Linley Wilson. In 1930, Priest went to London with Wilson, taking classes with Marie Rambert and Ruth French.

== Career ==
In 1932, Priest returned to Australia and opened a dance school in Adelaide. In 1937, she opened a new studio in Adelaide and in 1939 founded the South Australian Ballet Club. In 1954, she opened her Studio Theatre in a converted church in Adelaide, presenting performances of original ballets. Between 1959 and 1964, she spearheaded development of Southern Stars, a children's television program screened regularly by Channel 9.

Priest also used dance in educational and charitable work. During the 1940s, she organised fundraising performances for children with disabilities and worked with the Oral Pre-School Movement, teaching rhythm and movement to children who were deaf. She later organised dance classes to support the rehabilitation of children affected by polio.

Priest produced the Australian premiere of Britten's Let's Make an Opera (The Little Sweep) at the Palace Theatre, Sydney on 7 September 1951. Priest produced her ballet The Listeners, originally created in 1948, for the newly constituted National Theatre Ballet. Other major choreographed works included Catulli Carmina for the Australian Ballet in 1964. Priest also produced Let's Make an Opera for the New South Wales Division of the Arts Council, and Amahl and the Night Visitors for both stage and television. She produced Tales from Noonameena for the Marionette Theatre in 1973.

Priest was appointed an Office of the British Empire in the 1970 New Year Honours.
