= Parktown Convent =

Coordinates: 26.16762°S 28.04579°E

Holy Family College
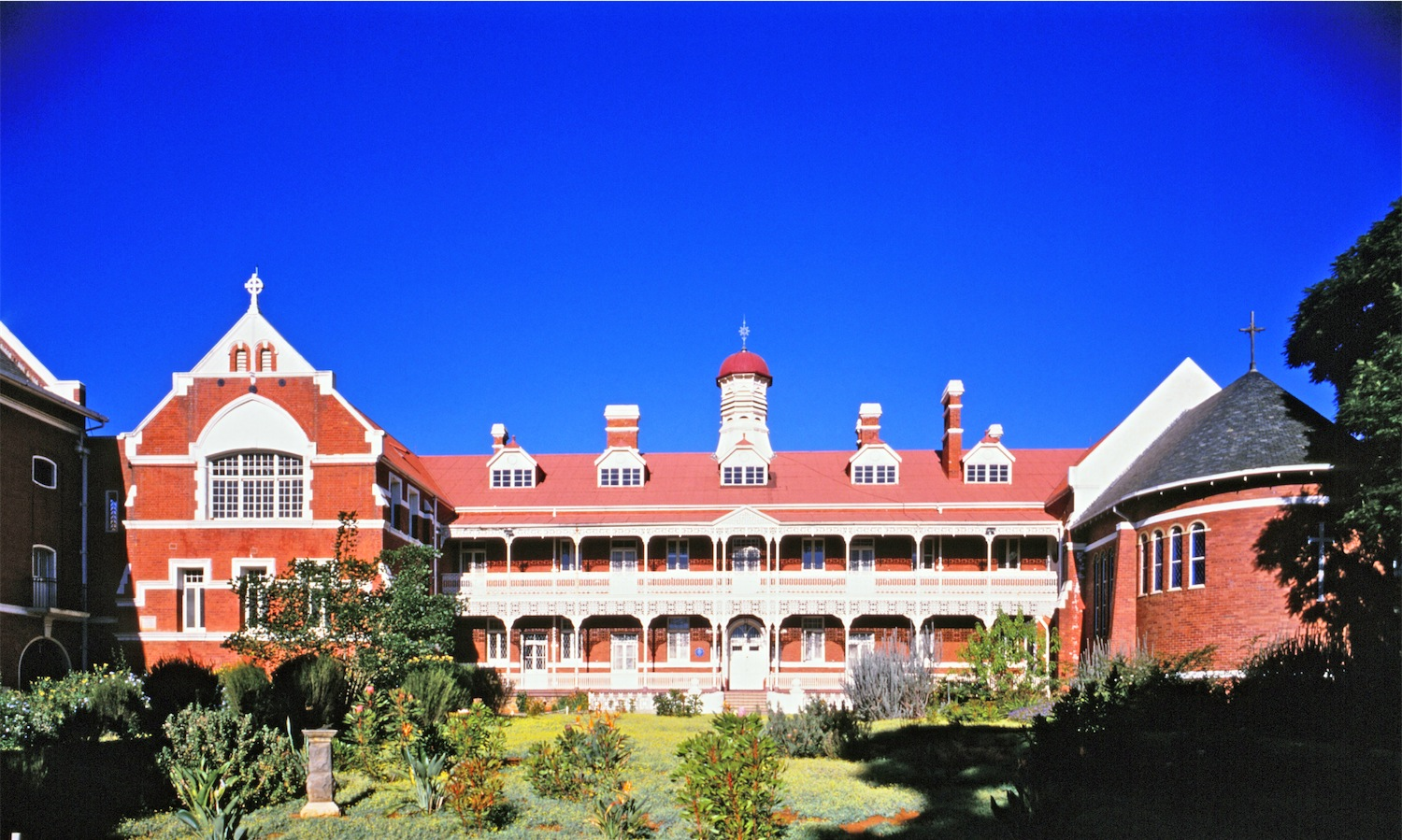
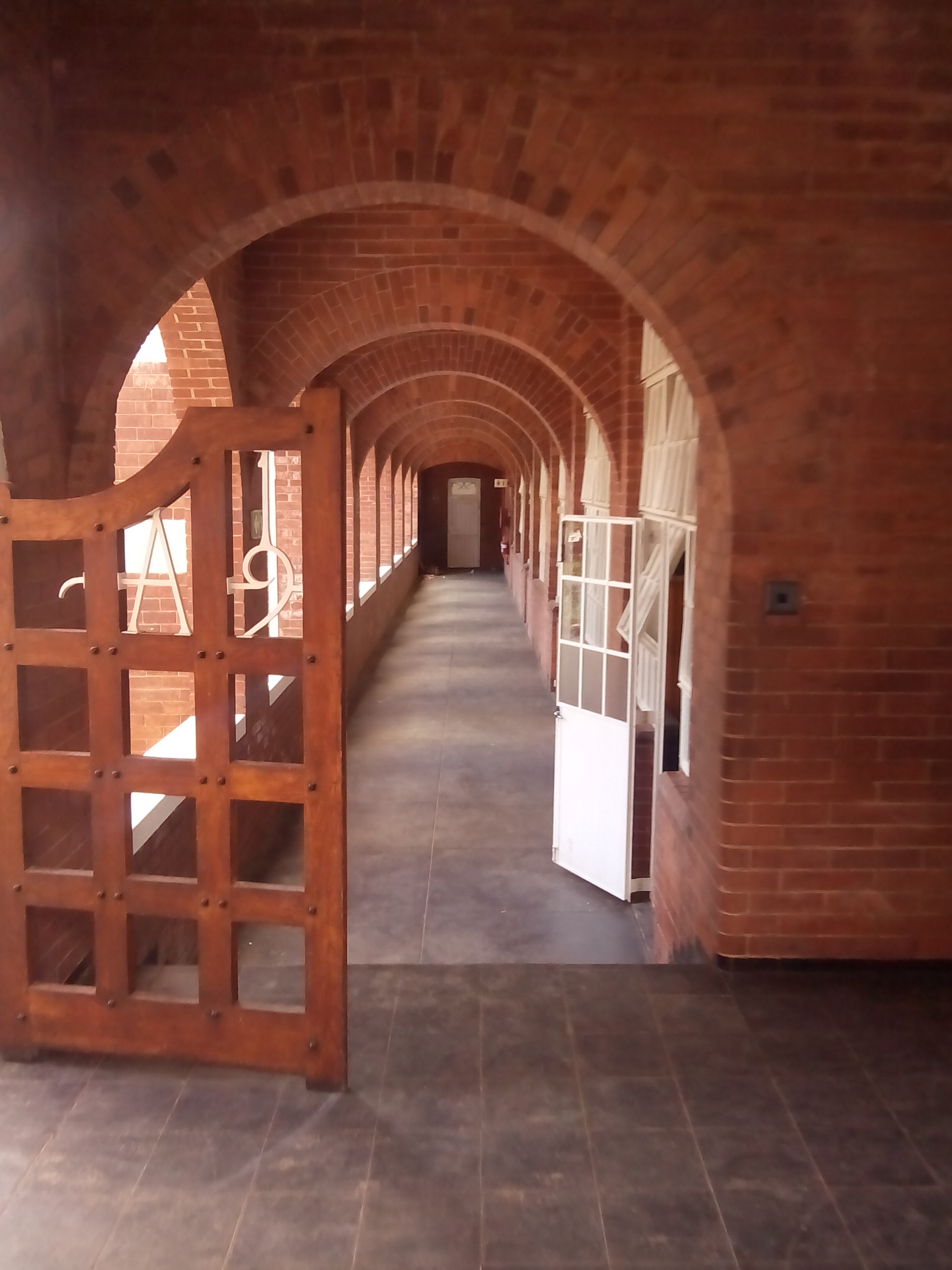
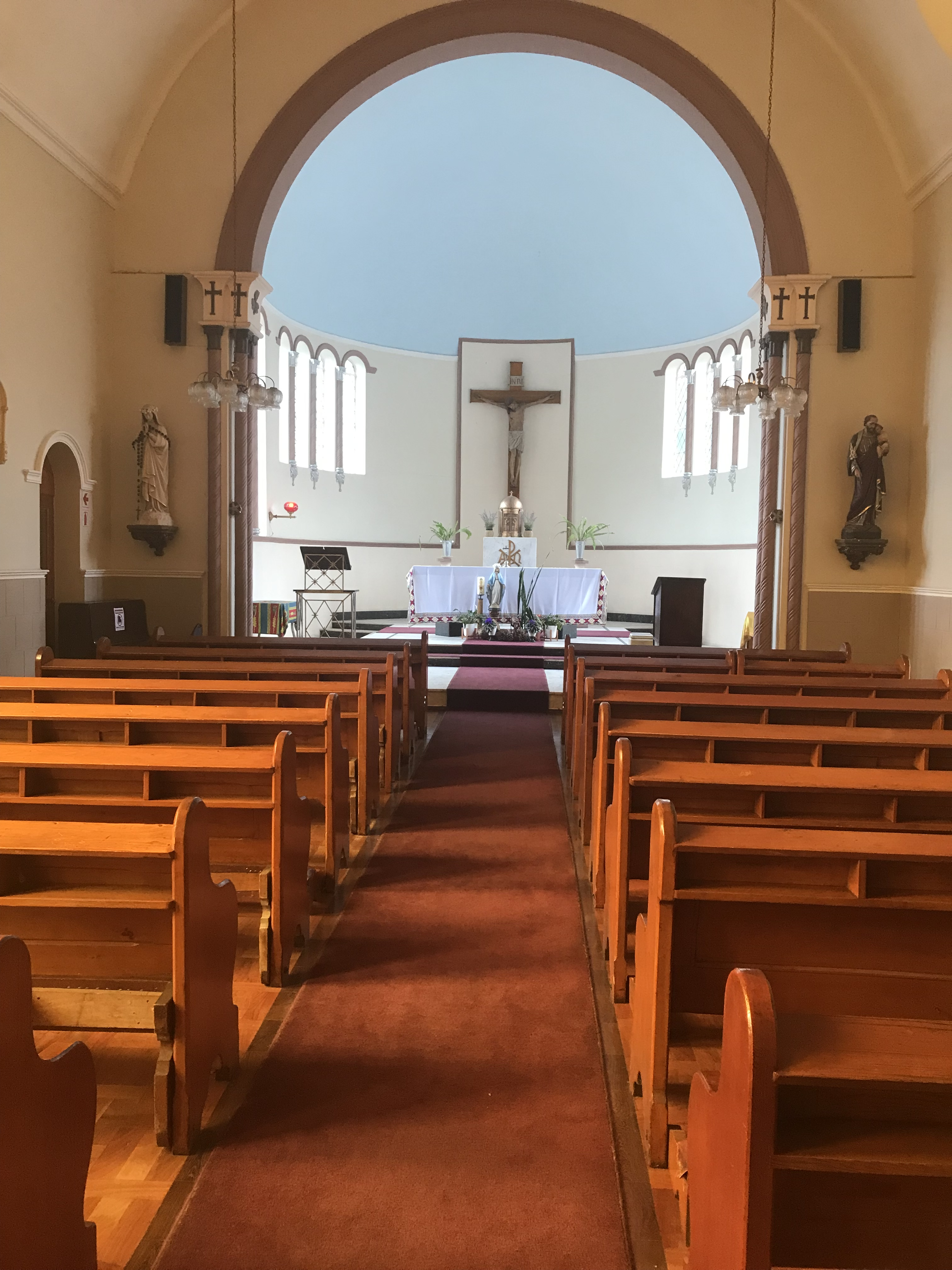
- School Chapel
- Parktown, Gauteng; South Africa

Information
- Type: Private school
- Motto: Latin: Quid Retribuam (What shall I give back?)
- Established: 1905
- Principal: Mark Potterton
- Campus: Suburban
- Colours: Black and red
- Website: holyfamily.co.za

Parktown Convent for Girls (now Holy Family College) was a private girls' school founded in 1905. It is located in Parktown, South Africa. The school is part of Johannesburg East in Gauteng. In 1991, the school became Holy Family College.

== History ==
The convent was founded by Mother Ambrose Farren, [Cassie Farren DOB 1861] who came from Moville, Co Donegal, Ireland.

== Notable alumni ==
Helen Suzman, a liberal South African, anti-apartheid activist and notable politician, attended the convent and matriculated from the school in 1933. She later become an eloquent public speaker with a sharp and witty manner, Suzman was noted for her strong public criticism of the governing National Party's policies of apartheid at a time when this was atypical of white South Africans.

Margaret Scott graduated from the convent school in 1939, went to London, and continued her training as a ballet dancer. She performed with Sadler's Wells Ballet and Ballet Rambert in England and Australia in the 1940s. She moved to Australia in 1953 and became the first director of the Australian Ballet School, a post she held for twenty-six years.

Moira Lister, later Viscountess of Orthez, attended the school before her London stage debut on 12 April 1937 at Golders Green Hippodrome. She became a film, stage and television actress and writer. She starred in Peter Ustinov's long-running 1951 play The Love of Four Colonels in the West End.

== Fire ==
Part of the school was destroyed by fire in 2013.
