= Peggy Sager =

Australian dancer and educator

Peggy Sager (1924 – 2002) was an Australian dancer and educator.

The daughter of James and Rose Sager, she was born in Auckland. She trained at the Nettleton-Edwards School in Hamilton. After passing her Royal Academy of Dancing (RAD) advanced level exam in 1941, she moved to Sydney. She passed the RAD Solo Seal exam and joined the Kirsova Ballet, which was based in Sydney. After that company folded, Sager joined the Borovansky Ballet in 1945. She performed with that company until she was forced to retire because of illness in 1959. Her partners in dance included her first husband Paul Hammond, Vassilie Trunoff, Royes Fernandez, Paul Grinwis, Robert Pomie and Garth Welch. During the late 1940s, during an extended layoff period from the company, she danced with the Metropolitan Ballet in England and the Brussels Opera in Belgium.

She married dancer Paul Hammond in 1945. In 1959, she married businessman Ken Taylor.

Sager opened a ballet school with her first husband in Melbourne in 1953. In 1954, she received the RAD's advanced teacher's certificate. For a number of years after her retirement from performing, she was director of the Peggy Sager School of Ballet in Mount Eliza. She also served on the board of The Australian Ballet.

Sager was known for her technical ability although she was told by English dancer Anton Dolin that she was "not a chocolate-box beauty".

She appeared in the 1948 film The Red Shoes.

Sager died in Coffs Harbour at the age of 78.
