= Paul Hammond (ballet dancer) =

Australian ballet dancer, teacher, and choreographer

Paul Clement Hammond OAM (16 December 1922 – 10 September 2010) was an Australian ballet dancer, teacher and choreographer.

== Career ==
=== As a performer ===
Inspired as a teenager by the Ballet Russe de Monte Carlo, Hammond started dancing at the age of 17, studying ballet with Mischa Burlakov, Helene Kirsova and Leon Kellaway. From his early twenties, Hammond held numerous senior roles with premier Australian ballet companies. As Principal and Soloist with the Kirsova Ballet, Australia's first professional ballet company, Hammond danced the principal roles in various productions including Les Sylphides, Hansel & Gretel, Swan Lake and Harlequin. He went on to become a Leading Soloist with the Borovansky Ballet — the precursor to the Australian Ballet — for over a decade, and danced in major roles in a range of productions including Symphonie Fantastique, Beau Danube, Petrouchka, Scheherazade, The Outlaw, Sleeping Princess and Giselle. Edouard Borovansky's 1951 production of The Sleeping Princess, in which Hammond appeared as Carabosse, received great critical acclaim and was billed as 'an important milestone in the history of ballet in Australia'.

Throughout his early career, Hammond traveled extensively abroad to train and dance as Principal with companies including the Glyndebourne Opera Company (UK) as Assistant Ballet Master and as Principal Dancer in Orpheé. As Principal Dancer with the Metropolitan Ballet (UK) from 1948 to 1950, Hammond performed the lead role in several productions including Prince Siegfried in Swan Lake and Prince Florimund in Sleeping Beauty. As a Principal Dancer with the Théâtre Royal de Monnaie (Belgium), Hammond danced in various opera productions and ballet divertissements including Brahms Variations and Bouquetierre des Violets.

In addition to extensive classical ballet training in Australia, Hammond studied ballet in Western and Eastern Europe, with acclaimed teachers including Vera Volkova, Anna Northcote, Lubov Egorova and Olga Preobajenska. In 1948, Sir Robert Helpmann invited Hammond, along with Peggy Sager, to dance in the pioneer ballet film The Red Shoes.

=== As a teacher and choreographer ===
In the 1950s, Hammond gained his Advanced Teachers Diploma from the Royal Academy of Dance and in 1953, founded the Paul Hammond Ballet School in Melbourne. Under the management and direction of Hammond, the Paul Hammond Ballet School soon established itself as a leading dance academy, and between 1953 and 1976, produced and trained successful dancers such as Don Asker, Dale Baker, Walter Bourke, Roma Egan, Michaela Kirkaldie, John O’Brien, Gailene Stock, Robert Ray, and Margaret Wilson among numerous others. Following their stage career, many of these dancers went on to become professional teachers, examiners and choreographers in Australian and abroad. For example, Gailene Stock is currently Director of the Royal Ballet School in London; Dale Baker, Michaela Kirkaldie, and Margaret Wilson are resident teachers at the Australian Ballet School; while Tina Stuart is an international examiner for the Royal Academy of Dance.

During this time, Hammond choreographed numerous works for television and the stage, including the musical, Lock up your Daughters (Garnet H Carroll), the Union Theatre's original musical production of Lola Montez and a series of ballet productions commissioned by ABC Television.

Prior to and in addition to running his own school, Hammond took on many freelance and guest teaching roles including with GTV Channel 9, Crawford TV School, Netherlands Dance Theatre, Luisillo and his Spanish Dance Company, the New Zealand Ballet Company and School, and The Australian Ballet.

From 1975 to 1981, Hammond was a Senior Tutor of Classical Ballet at The Australian Ballet School under the direction of Dame Margaret Scott. From 1981 until his retirement in 1995, he was the Archivist and Dance History Tutor at the Australian Ballet School, as well as Archivist for The Australian Ballet company for a short time. Combining his ongoing pursuit for excellence in dance with his passion for and in-depth knowledge of dance history and music, Hammond tutored and mentored scores of successful Australian dancers including Paul Mercurio, Margaret Illman, Steven Heathcote, Christine Walsh, David McAllister and Wendy Walker.

Hammond became a Children's Examiner for the Royal Academy of Dance in 1964 and until the 1990s, examined for various bodies including the Royal Academy of Dance, The Australian Ballet School and the Victorian College of the Arts. His adjudication work included the 'Paul Hammond Encouragement Award' (one of the Kathleen Gorham Memorial Scholarships awarded annually), Ballet Teachers' Workshop of Victoria, Victorian College of the Arts, the Green Room Awards and various other Eisteddfods and Australian competitions.

Hammond co-founded the Royal Academy of Dance's Victorian Advisory Panel in 1956 and held various roles including Secretary, Chairman as well as Patron. In 1997, he was awarded a Fellowship of the Royal Academy of Dance and a Life Member for his services to the Academy. Hammond co-founded the Ballet Teachers' Workshop of Victoria, and was the Chairman before becoming the Workshops' Patron. In the 1990s, a Ballet Teachers' Workshop scholarship was established in his honour – the Paul Hammond Foundation Scholarship – awarded annually to the most promising senior male ballet student. In 2002, he was awarded a Life Member of the Green Room Awards and from this time until 2008, was a member of the Awards' dance panel.

Following his retirement from full-time work, and in addition to his adjudication and patronage commitments, Hammond shared his expertise and knowledge of the arts through volunteer work with the Performing Arts Collection at the Victorian Arts Centre. From 1996 to 2007, Hammond volunteered regularly with the Australian Centre for the Moving Image in Melbourne, examining and evaluating local and international archival material on 16 mm film.

In January 2008, Hammond was awarded the Medal (OAM) of the Order of Australia in recognition of his service to the development and promotion of dance, particularly ballet, as a performer, choreographer and teacher. In June 2008, he was awarded the Lifetime Achievement Award from Ausdance at the 2008 Australian Dance Awards held in Melbourne.

== Personal life ==
Born in Marrickville, Sydney, Hammond was the only child of a coachbuilder, Richard Hammond, who later owned a music shop and his amateur singer-actor wife Ruby. He spent the first decades of his life in Sydney, following by significant stints abroad and later moved to Melbourne where he founded the Paul Hammond Ballet School with his then wife, ballerina Peggy Sager. Hammond separated from Sager in the mid-50s and later married former student and musical theatre dancer Diana Lucas in Melbourne in 1970. In 1974 they had one daughter, Carly.
