= Vassilie Trunoff =

Australian ballet dancer

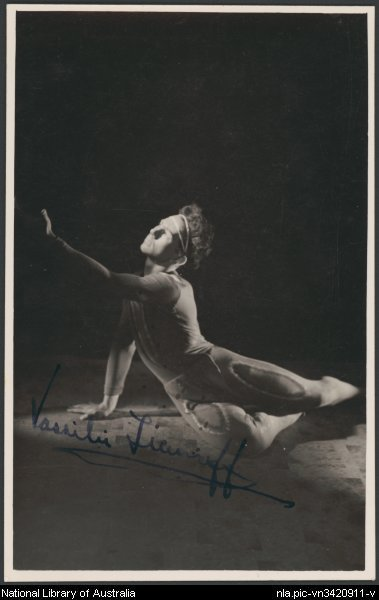
- Trunoff as "Aborigine" in Terra Australis
- Born: 1929; Melbourne, Australia
- Died: 1985 (aged 55–56); London, England
- Occupation: Ballet dancer
- Spouse: Joan Potter

Vassilie Trunoff (1929 in Melbourne, Australia – 1985 in London, England) was an Australian ballet dancer. He was born of Russian emigre parents and began dancing in his mother's folk dancing troupe. His dancing was noticed by Edouard Borovansky who offered him classes at the Borovansky school. He soon became a member of the fledgling Borovansky Ballet. He performed a wide variety of roles in the Borovansky repertoire and in 1946 created the part of the Aborigine in Borovansky's Terra Australis. At the end of the 1947 Borovansky season Trunoff joined Ballet Rambert for its Australian tour and performed with the company under the name of Basil Truro. He performed in a season of the musical Oklahoma! and subsequently married fellow dancer Joan Potter. In 1950, Trunoff left Australia for London. He joined the London Festival Ballet as a soloist and he was soon promoted to principal, gaining a reputation for his virtuosity of technique. At Borovansky's invitation, Trunoff and his wife returned to Australia in 1954, however in 1958 they both rejoined the London Festival Ballet as ballet master and ballet mistress respectively. As ballet master, Trunoff toured to Australia in 1975 and 1977 with Festival Ballet productions that included Romeo and Juliet and Giselle. He returned again in 1980 to produce Scheherazade and Graduation Ball for the Australian Ballet's special tribute season in honour of Edouard Borovansky. Trunoff died in London in 1985.
