= Kathleen Gorham =

Australian ballerina (1928–1983)

Gorham, circa 1951

Kathleen Ann "Kathy" Gorham OBE (7 September 1928 - 30 April 1983) was an Australian ballerina.

== Early life ==
Born in Narrandera, New South Wales, the second of four children of Marcus Gorham, an Irish-born railway employee, and his English-born wife, Hilda Muriel Florence (née Somers), Kathy Gorham lived much of her life in Melbourne.

== Career ==
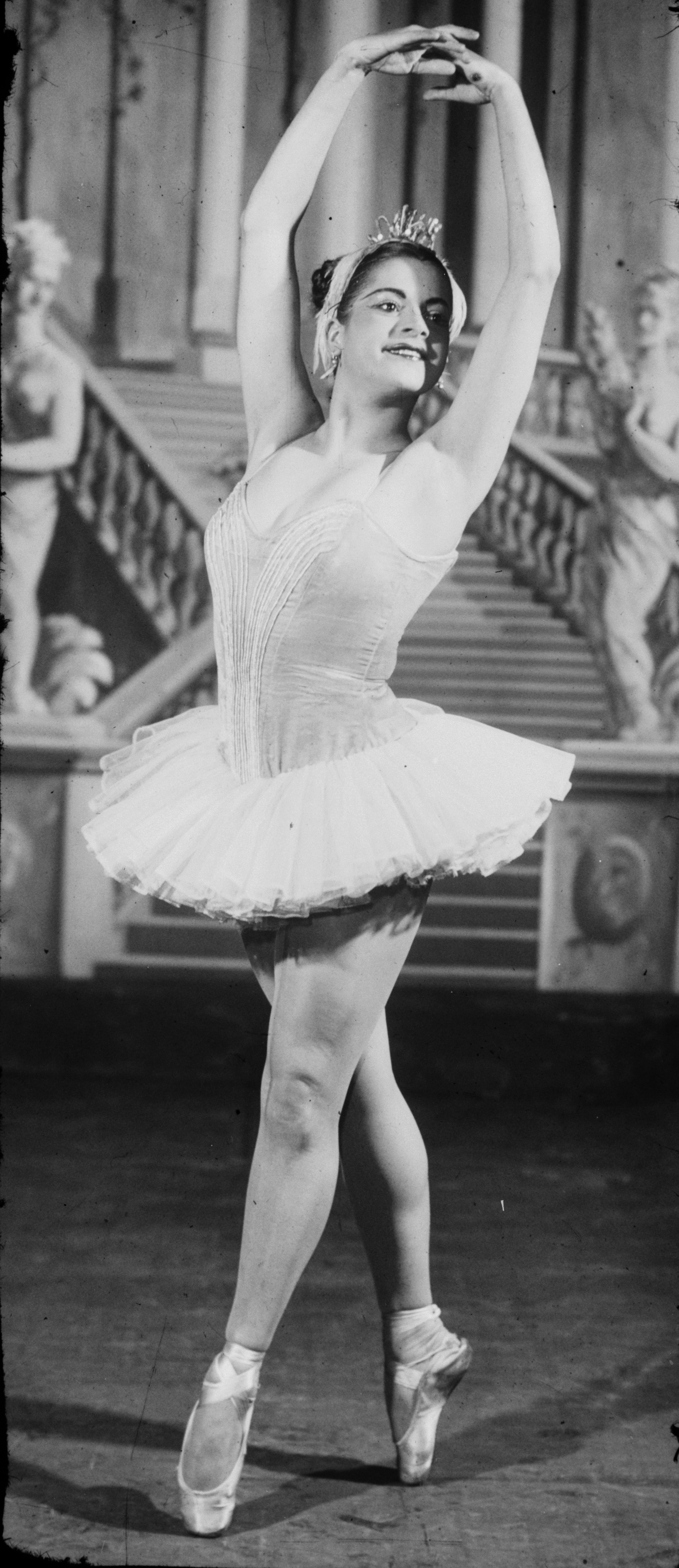
Australian ballerina Kathleen Gorham, cover for Woman magazine, 23 July 1951

She began dancing at the age of fifteen with the Borovansky Ballet, continuing to dance with the Ballet until it disbanded in 1960 upon the death of Edouard Borovansky. She then danced overseas with companies in Paris and London. In 1962, Gorham became prima ballerina of the newly formed Australian Ballet.

During 1952 and 1953 she danced in London with the Sadler's Wells Theatre Ballet, and in Europe with Le Grand Ballet du Marquis de Cuevas. In 1954 she returned to Australia with Borovansky, and that same year she was selected by John Cranko to dance "Poll" in his restaging of Pineapple Poll for the Borovansky Ballet. She continued to dance for Borovansky and as guest artist for various European companies until she became a principal with Dame Peggy van Praagh's Australian Ballet in 1962, where she danced a wide range of roles for four years. She danced new roles in association with Robert Helpmann and played an important role in the artistic development of the new ballet company. She retired from dancing after the Australian Ballet's first overseas tour in 1966, and then taught ballet in Melbourne at her own School until 1975, The National Theatre Ballet (1975–81) and Southport, Queensland until her untimely death.

She served as co-artistic director of the National Theatre, Melbourne. She was appointed an Officer of the Order of the British Empire in 1968 for her services to ballet.

== Personal life ==
On 18 November 1958 Gorham married Robert Michel Pomie, a French choreographer and dancer, at Parramatta, Sydney; they had one son, Anthony Marrows. The couple divorced in 1964 and Gorham remarried, to Barney Frank Marrows, an engineer, on 6 September 1967. Gorham’s son Anthony, a social worker with children, died in 2007 of a heart attack.

== Death ==
After a stroke in 1979, she settled in 1981 at Southport, Queensland, and continued to teach. She died there, aged 54, following a heart attack. She was survived by her son, Anthony Marrows and her second husband, Barney Marrows

== Links ==
- Kathleen Gorham at The Australian Women's Register
