= Laurel Martyn =

Australian ballerina (1916–2013)

Laurel Martyn OBE
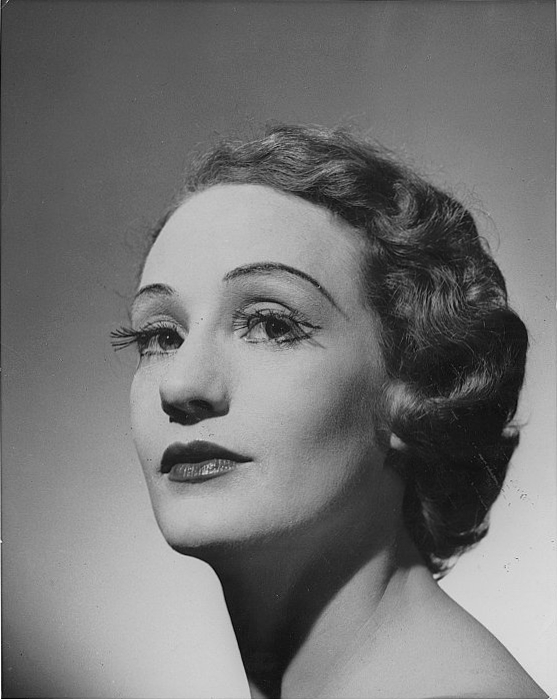
- Helmut Newton's 1952 portrait of Laurel Martyn, National Library of Australia
- Born: Laurel Gill; 23 July 1916; Toowoomba, Queensland, Australia
- Died: 16 October 2013 (aged 97)
- Occupation: Ballet dancer
- Spouse: Lloyd Lawton (m. 1945)

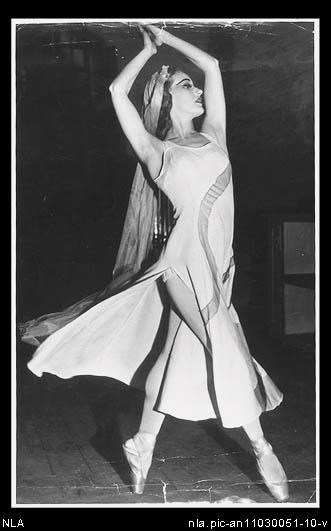
Laurel Martyn in Vltava, Borovansky Ballet, 1940, National Library of Australia

Laurel Martyn OBE (née Gill; 23 July 1916 – 16 October 2013) was an Australian ballerina.

In 1933, she left Australia for England and studied with Phyllis Bedells. In 1934 she won a choreographic scholarship from the Association of Operatic Dancing (later the Royal Academy of Dance) for Exile, her first composition. In 1935 she became the first Australian to win the Adeline Genée Gold Medal. Martyn joined the Vic-Wells Ballet (later Sadler's Wells) in December 1935, the first Australian woman to be accepted into the company. By 1938, she was a soloist. That same year, she returned to Australia and became a dance teacher. She joined Edouard Borovansky's eponymous ballet corps in 1940 and remained until her marriage to Lloyd Lawton in 1945. she then continued dancing and died at the age of 97 in the 2013

== Works ==
After leaving the Borovansky Ballet in 1945, Martyn began creating her own dance works. These included The Sentimental Bloke Who Couldn't Be a Man in 1952 and Mathinna in 1954. These works were inspired by Australian themes. The Sentimental Bloke used Australian literature for inspiration and Mathinna, concerning an Aboriginal Tasmanian girl adopted into white society, explored the political, social and racial implications of relationships between Aboriginal Australians and colonial settlers. Martyn's choreographic works also included Voyageur and En Saga. In 2023, researcher Yvette Grant examined these works using materials held by the National Library of Australia and undertook re-enactments of both. The Library's collections include manuscripts, photographs, sheet music and audio recordings documenting Martyn's career.

== Later years ==
She also was instrumental in forming the Young Dancers' Theatre, for which she choreographed several works in the 1980s, and the Classical Dance Teachers Australia Inc, which provided in-service training for dance teachers.
