= Edouard Borovansky =

Czech-Australian ballet dancer (1902–1959)

- Self-portrait by Edouard Borovansky,1948, oil on board, 45.7 x 36 cm, National Library of Australia, Australia
- Born: Eduard Josef Skřeček; 24 February 1902; Přerov, Moravia, Austro-Hungarian Empire (now Czech Republic)
- Died: 18 December 1959 (aged 57); Randwick, Sydney, New South Wales, Australia
- Occupation: Ballet dancer
- Spouse: Xenia Nicolaeva Smirnoff (1933–)
- Parent(s): František and Arnošta Skřeček

Edouard Borovansky (24 February 1902 – 18 December 1959) was a Czech-born Australian ballet dancer, choreographer and director. After touring with Anna Pavlova's company, he and his wife, Xenia, settled in Australia where they established the Borovansky Ballet company. This company provided the foundation for modern ballet in Australia and was subsequently used as the basis for the first national Australian ballet company, The Australian Ballet which was established in 1962.

== Early years ==
Edouard Borovansky as The Strong Man in Le Beau Danube, Ballet Russe de Monte Carlo, c.1935 National Library of Australia

Eduard Josef Skřeček was born on 24 February 1902 in Přerov, Austro-Hungarian Empire. He was the seventh child of František Skřeček, a railway clerk, and his wife Arnošta. After graduating school he worked as an accountant before he was called up for military service in the Czechoslovak Air Force. In 1921, he joined the chorus of the Olomouc Opera Company as a baritone, however as he had an early gymnastic training he was transferred to the corps de ballet. In September 1923 he successfully auditioned for the Prague National Theatre where he began to work his way up the hierarchy before he gained a place in Anna Pavlova's touring company in 1928. He began his career as a dancer of character roles by changing his name to Eduard Borowanski. He first performed with the Pavlova Ballet in Hamburg, Germany. He then toured for seasons in Britain, South America and Asia. He first toured Australia with the company in 1929. However, the company collapsed after the death of Anna Pavlova in 1930, and he and his companion, the Russian-born Xenia Nikolayevna Krüger, née Smirnova (1903–1985), scraped a living by teaching children in makeshift studios in Paris, then Prague and Berlin. He married Krüger, a divorcee, on 14 October 1933 at the register office, Westminster, London. In 1932 he joined the Ballet Russe de Monte Carlo. His notable roles with this company were the Strong Man in Le Beau Danube, Polkan in Le Coq d'Or and the Shopkeeper of La Boutique fantasque. He revisited Australia in 1938 with the company, now renamed The Royal Covent Garden Russian Ballet, however he and his wife decided to remain in Australia at the end of the tour.

== Borovansky Ballet ==
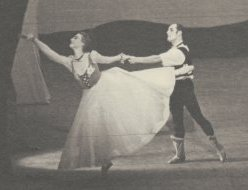
Ann MacKintosh as the Woman and Edouard Borovansky as the Man in Fantasy on Grieg's Concerto in A minor, Borovansky Ballet, c.1941, National Library of Australia

After Adolf Hitler's annexation of Czechoslovakia in 1939, Borovansky and his wife Xenia felt that there was little future for ballet in the region and the outbreak of World War II a few months later gave them little incentive or opportunity to return to Europe. With his wife, he established a ballet school in Melbourne named the Melbourne Academy of Russian Ballet. Xenia was the principal teacher, while Borovansky handled the administration. By 1940 the academy had grown and Borovansky was able to establish the Borovansky Australian Ballet Company, which held its first season at the Comedy Theatre, Melbourne in December of that year. The principal dancer was Laurel Martyn. The ballet company was variously called the Borovansky Ballet, the Borovansky Australian Ballet Company, the Borovansky Ballet of 40 and the Borovansky Jubilee Ballet. Borovansky had also encouraged the formation of the Melbourne Ballet Club, which displayed and encouraged new choreography.

From 1940 his company presented studio performances for the Melbourne Ballet Club of original choreography by himself, Xenia Borovansky, Laurel Martyn and Dorothy Stevenson. Works choreographed and presented during this period include Martyn's Sigrid, Stevenson's Sea Legend (whose setting was designed by William Constable) and Martyn's En Saga. In 1942, Borovansky's company presented a five-night season at the Princess Theatre, Melbourne. The season was such a success that it convinced J. C. Williamson Theatres Ltd that ballet "was potentially big business". Borovansky now had commercial backing and access to theatres across Australia. In return, his company was formed to provide commercial success. The backing of J. C. Williamson Theatres Ltd was a turning point, for without it the company would have died, similarly to the Sydney-based Kirsova Ballet (1941–44), which had refused commercial backing and collapsed despite an Australia-wide following. The company therefore performed "large, colourful, familiar works which were what 'the Firm' preferred".

Borovansky was naturalised as a British subject in 1944, becoming a well-known figure in Melbourne and "notorious for his despotic treatment of his dancers". In 1944, the 40-strong company had toured the mainland capitals, Tasmania and New Zealand with a repertoire that included Giselle, Swan Lake (Act II), Les Sylphides, En Saga, Capriccio Italien, Frederick Ashton's Façade, and Borovansky's symphonic fantasy, Vltava. In 1945, the company toured mainland Australia again. Borovansky's operation was assisted artistically in no small measure by the presence of his pre-war colleague, the principal dancer, Tamara Tchinarova, whose memory of the choreography surpassed his. This tour included an 8-month season in Melbourne featuring the "tried favourites of pre-war 'Russian ballet'" – Le Carnaval, Schéhérazade and Le Beau Danube – as well as a new work by Borovansky, Terra Australis.

At the end of this season Laurel Martyn left the company to form, out of the original Melbourne Ballet Club, the Victorian Ballet Guild. Her choice of a small, experimental dance company over the glamorous professional stage highlighted the dilemma Borovansky faced. Borovansky had built a "strong, commercially attractive operation on the basis of the school run by his wife and a keen sense of what the public would pay to see". However, as his company was funded by J. C. Williamson's, they dictated what the company could do. Borovansky's company had expanded and now included such dancers as Paul Hammond, Martin Rubinstein, Leon Kellaway, Peggy Sager, Kathleen Gorham, Vassilie Trunoff and Edna Busse. For the next 18 months, the company (now called the Borovansky Ballet) became the dance-chorus for two operettas and toured New Zealand a second time while also holding seasons of Coppélia and other favourites. The company was disbanded in 1948 due to lack of financial backing.

In 1951, Borovansky assembled a second company called the Borovansky Jubilee Ballet which was sponsored by the Education in Music and Dramatic Arts Society as well as J. C. Williamson's. He presented ambitious productions with the company such as a full-sized Petrouchka that year. While in 1952, he produced a complete Sleeping Princess. Seasons included Léonide Massine's Symphonie Fantastique (1954), John Cranko's Pineapple Poll (1954) and David Lichine's full-length The Nutcracker (1955). During its 1957 season, it hosted guest artists from the Royal Ballet including Margot Fonteyn. Borovansky choreographed a number of works for his company. Some, like The Black Swan, Terra Australis and The Outlaw, were overtly Australian in theme. Later, choreographers who worked for him included company members Paul Grinwis and Robert Pomié. He also commissioned David Lichine to create an original ballet which premiered on 17 February 1956 as Corrida.

== Works ==
Borovansky choreographed several works for his company. His first work, Vltava, premiered at the Comedy Theatre, Melbourne, on 9 December 1940 as part of the first season of the Borovansky Australian Ballet Company. Vltava was "patriotically Czech in music, theme and imagery" as it drew on his European heritage for inspiration. Borovansky choreographed this work to the symphonic poem Má vlast by Czech composer Bedřich Smetana. The Vltava is the longest river in the Czech Republic and thus the main role was named the Spirit of the River and was originally danced by Laurel Martyn. The main male roles of the Hunters were taken by Noel Neville, George Hale, Reg Bartram and Laurie Rentoul. In the original performances the music was played on two pianos by Marjorie Summers and Edna Bennet. According to the programme of the performance, Borovansky "endeavoured to express the spirit of the young Czechoslovakia". The cast wore white shorts and shirts for their costumes, which suggested that Borovansky was making a political statement on the nationalistic youth movements of Czechoslovakia with which he was familiar. The choreography was reminiscent of Léonide Massine's Choreartium. This work remained in the repertoire of the company until at least 1945 when it was taken on tour to New Zealand.

Borovansky's second ballet was Terra Australis, which is the first all-Australian ballet. It premiered in Melbourne on 25 May 1946, performed by his company. The ballet's libretto was by Tom Rothfield while the score was commissioned from Esther Rofe. The ballet focused on the subject of Australia's colonisation by white settlers. This was represented in the form of a love triangle where the virginal Spirit of Australia was courted by a white explorer and an Aboriginal lover. The original cast featured Peggy Sager as the Spirit of Australia, Martin Rubinstein as the Explorer and Vassilie Trunoff as the Aborigine. The ballet was restaged in 1947 with Kathleen Gorham as the new lead.

Borovansky's next ballet, The Black Swan, also had an Australian theme. It was based on a historical incident in 1697 when Captain Vlaming from the Dutch East India Company was exploring Australia. He discovered and named Rottnest Island and the river on which the city of Perth now stands. There were a large number of black swans on the river, which drew Captain Vlamingh's attention and his crew captured several and took them back to Java. Thus, the main plot of the ballet was the story of the Captain entranced by a black swan, which symbolised a new land. The ballet premiered in Melbourne in the Borovansky Ballet's 1949 season. The work was revived both in 1950 and 1951.

== Death and legacy ==
Borovansky died of a coronary occlusion on 18 December 1959 at Randwick, and was buried with Anglican rites in Box Hill Cemetery, Melbourne. He was survived by his wife; they had no children. His company provided the basis for the creation of a national Australian company. The artistic director of the Borovansky Ballet, Peggy van Praagh, founded the Australian Ballet in 1962. His dancers also provided the nucleus of the national ballet company – including such dancers as Garth Welch, Robert Pomie, Jeffrey Kovel, Estella Nova and Rosemary Mildner. During his last season of Sleeping Princess, Marilyn Jones was hailed overnight as a ballerina. The Borovansky Ballet company was "both an intensely personal creation, where one man did almost everything, and a national ballet, eager to draw on whatever talent it could employ". On 21 March 1980 a gala tribute celebrating Borovansky's work as the founder of ballet in Australia was held at the Sydney Opera House. The programme consisted of Pineapple Poll, Schéhérazade and Graduation Ball. He was posthumously inducted into the Hall of Fame at the Australian Dance Awards in 1999.
