= Dance in Australia =

Aspect of Australian culture

Dance in Australia spans a wide range of traditions and styles. Aboriginal and Torres Strait Islander dance dates back thousands of years, and serves as an important form of storytelling and cultural ritual. Following European settlement, folk traditions from England, Ireland, and Scotland evolved into a distinctly Australian style known as bush dance. More recently, classical performance has risen in prominence through institutions such as the Australian Ballet.

Australia has also given rise to unique styles like the Melbourne Shuffle, a rave dance from the late 1980s, and New Vogue, a sequence-based form of ballroom dancing.

== Indigenous Australian dance ==
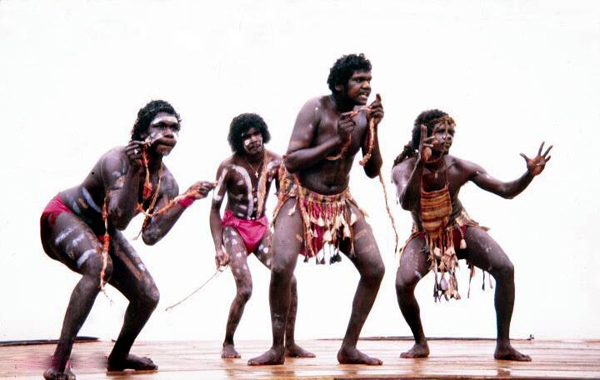
Australian Aboriginal dancers in 1981.

Traditional Aboriginal Australian dance dates back thousands of years, and was closely associated with song and was understood and experienced as making present the reality of the Dreamtime. In some instances, they would imitate the actions of a particular animal as part of telling a story. For the people in their own country it defined roles, responsibilities and the place itself. These ritual performances gave them an understanding of themselves in the interplay of social, geographical and environmental forces. The performances were associated with specific places and dance grounds were often sacred places. The body decoration and specific gestures related to kin and other relationships, such as to Dreamtime beings. Some groups hold their dances secret or sacred. Gender is an important factor in some ceremonies with men and women having separate ceremonial traditions, such as the Crane Dance.

The term "corroboree" is sometimes used by non-Indigenous Australians to refer to any Aboriginal dance, although this term has its origins among the people of the Sydney region.

For Torres Strait Islander people, singing and dancing is their "literature" – "the most important aspect of Torres Strait lifestyle. The Torres Strait Islanders preserve and present their oral history through songs and dances;...the dances act as illustrative material and, of course, the dancer himself [sic] is the storyteller". There are many songs about the weather; others about the myths and legends; life in the sea and totemic gods; and about important events. "The dancing and its movements express the songs and acts as the illustrative material".

=== 20th–21st centuries ===
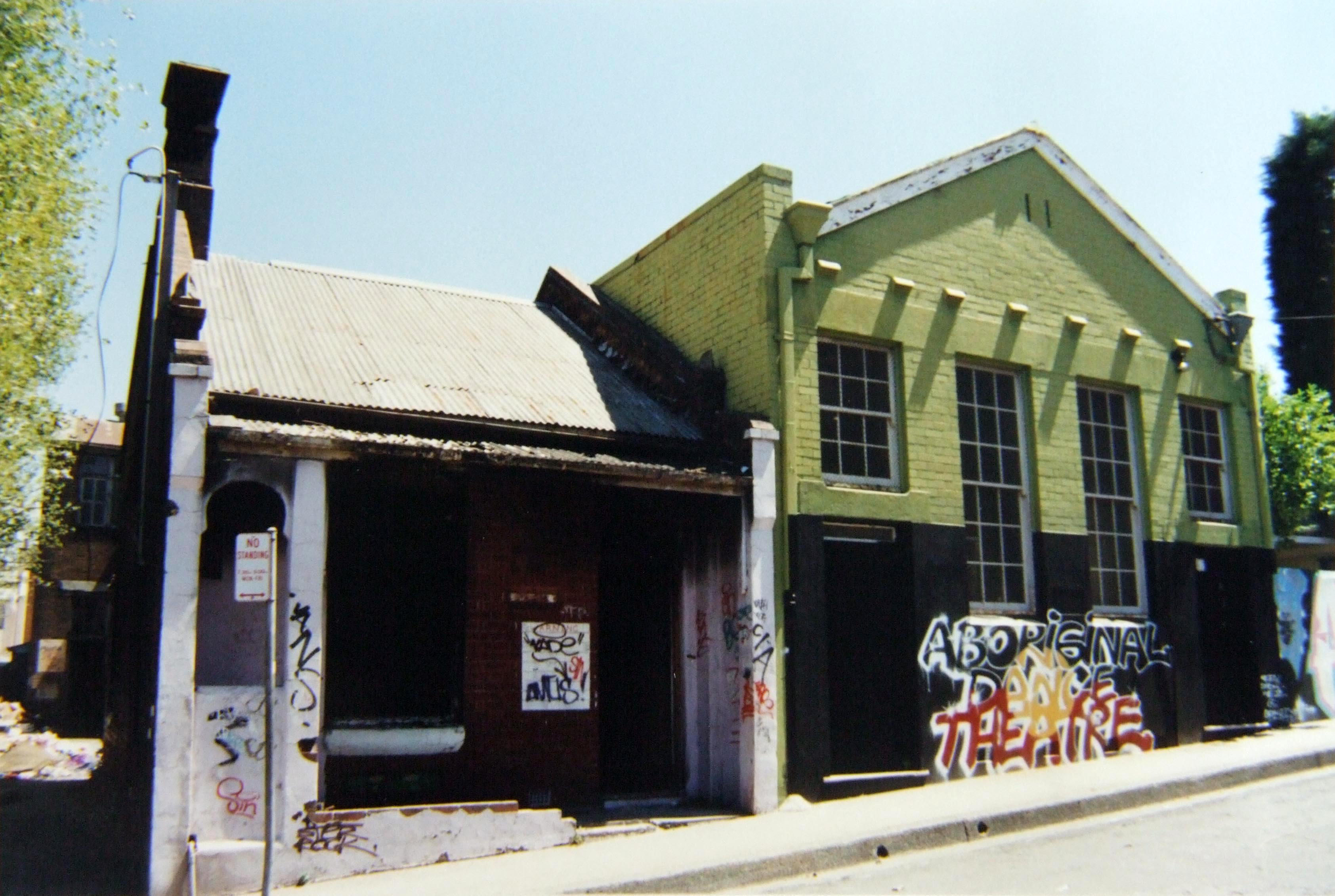
Aboriginal Dance Theatre Redfern, 1989

In the latter part of the 20th century, the influence of Indigenous Australian dance traditions was seen with the development of concert dance, particularly in contemporary dance with the National Aboriginal and Islander Skills Development Association (established 1975) and the Aboriginal Centre for the Performing Arts (ACPA, founded 1997) providing training to Indigenous Australians in dance, and the Bangarra Dance Theatre (founded 1989). With a new sense of pride emerging in a number of Aboriginal organisations in Redfern, Sydney, the Aboriginal Dance Theatre Redfern (ADTR) was established in 1979.

The National Aboriginal Dance Council Australia (NADCA, also referred to as National Aboriginal Dance Council of Australia) was established in 1995. With support from Ausdance, NADCA and ADRT founder Christine Donnelly convened three three major Indigenous dance conferences. The first conference was held in Sydney in 1995. The second was held in Adelaide in 1997; it included discussion of cultural and intellectual property rights and copyright issues for Australian Indigenous dancers. The third conference took place in Sydney in 1999, and was funded by the Australia Council.

== Bush dance ==
Bush dance has developed in Australia as a form of folk dance, drawing on traditions from English, Irish, Scottish and other European dance. Favourite dances in the community include dances of European descent such as the Irish Céilidh "Pride of Erin" and the quadrille "The Lancers".

One of the most well-known Australian bush dances is the Nutbush, a line dance typically performed to the American song Nutbush City Limits by Ike & Tina Turner. The Nutbush was developed around 1975 as part of an effort to modernize physical education and creative arts curricula for state primary and secondary schools. It was subsequently popularised and has seen sustained success to this day, including gaining viral popularity internationally through TikTok.

In 1980 the Bushwackers Band published The Bushwackers Band Dance Book and a companion LP containing a number of Australian bush dances. These were largely existing folk dances that had republished with more Australian names. For example, Waves of Tory became Waves of Bondi, the Ninepin quadrille became the Drongo and the Virginia Reel became Strip the Willow.

== Ballet ==
=== Ballet companies ===
The Australian Ballet was founded in 1962. It is the foremost classical ballet company in Australia, and is recognised as one of the world's major international ballet companies. It is based in Melbourne and performs works from the classical repertoire as well as contemporary works by major Australian and international choreographers. As of 2010, the Australian Ballet presented approximately 200 performances in cities and regional areas around Australia each year as well as on international tours. Regular venues include the Arts Centre Melbourne, Sydney Opera House, Sydney Theatre, Adelaide Festival Centre and Queensland Performing Arts Centre.

Other prominent Australian classical ballet companies include the Queensland Ballet and West Australian Ballet.

=== Ballet Dancers ===
Dame Peggy van Praagh was the founding artistic director of The Australian Ballet. Robert Helpmann was appointed co-artistic director along side van Praagh in 1965.

Li Cunxin, acclaimed ballerino and author of the best-selling autobiography Mao's Last Dancer, moved to Melbourne in 1995 where he became a principal dancer with the Australian Ballet. He subsequently served as the artistic director of Queensland Ballet from 2013 to 2023.

Australian ballet history includes the contributions of Laurel Martyn, Joanna Priest, Louise Lightfoot and Valrene Tweedie. Martyn contributed to ballet performance, choreography, administration and teaching, and held leadership roles with the Ballet Guild, Victorian Ballet Company and Ballet Victoria. In 2023, researcher Yvette Grant examined archival collections at the National Library of Australia to document the work and influence of these four women.

== Other Australian dances ==
=== Melbourne shuffle ===
The Melbourne shuffle is a rave dance that developed in Melbourne in the late 1980s and early 1990s. The dance moves involve a fast heel-and-toe movement or T-step, combined with a variation of the running man coupled with a matching arm action. The dance has no set steps and is primarily based on footwork involving sliding from left to right, moving in a triangular direction, or remaining on the spot.

=== New Vogue ===
The New Vogue is an Australian style of sequence Ballroom dancing. Each New Vogue dance has a fixed sequence of steps that can be learnt in advance. Compared to traditional Ballroom dancing which is heavily reliant on the skill of the leader, New Vogue dances are more accessible to beginners as both partners can learn the steps and dance together. New Vogue Dancing is one of the three Dancesport styles in Australia, in addition to traditional Ballroom and Latin American.

== Dance in popular culture ==
Baz Luhrmann's 1992 film Strictly Ballroom, starring Paul Mercurio, depicts the Australian competitive ballroom dancing scene. The television series So You Think You Can Dance Australia premiered in 2008.

A bush doof is an outdoor electronic dance music party typically held in bush or rural settings. Bush doof culture developed in Australia in the early 1990s, with Earthcore, held in Victoria in 1993, credited as the first organised bush doofs.

== List of dance companies ==
=== Major dance companies ===
Major Australian performing arts organisations receive joint investment through the National Performing Arts Partnership Framework, administered by Creative Australia in partnership with state and territory arts agencies.

==== Ballet companies ====
- The Australian Ballet
- The Queensland Ballet
- The West Australian Ballet

==== Contemporary dance companies ====
- Australian Dance Theatre (Garry Stewart)
- Phillip Adams BalletLab
- Bangarra Dance Theatre (Stephen Page)
- Chunky Move
- Company In Space
- Dance Hub SA (previously Leigh Warren & Dancers)
- Dancenorth
- Descendance
- Australasian Dance Collective, previously Expressions Dance Company
- Force Majeure (Kate Champion)
- Lucy Guerin Inc
- Mirramu Dance Company
- Phunktional
- Sydney Dance Company
- TasDance

==== Youth dance companies ====
- QL2 Centre for Youth Dance
- Extensions Youth Dance Company
- Urban Ignition Youth Dance Company

=== Other dance companies ===
- Ambition School Of Dance
- Anything Is Valid Dance Theatre
- The Australian Ballet
- The Australian Choreographic Centre
- Australian Dance Theatre
- BalletLab (Contemporary dance company – Artistic Director, Phillip Adams)
- Bangarra Dance Theatre
- Blink Dance Theatre
- Buzz Dance Theatre
- Canberra Dance Theatre
- Chunky Move
- Dance Exchange
- Dance Hub SA (previously Leigh Warren & Dancers)
- Dance Works
- Dancehouse
- Dancenorth
- Dance Theatre Network (previously Jenny Kay School of Dance)
- Descendance
- Expressions Dance Company
- Force Majeure (dance company) led by Kate Champion
- Igneous
- Kage Physical Theatre
- Mirramu Dance Company
- Move Through Life Dance Company
- Nunukul Yuggera Aboriginal Dancers
- One Extra Dance
- Passada School of Afro Latin Dance
- The Queensland Ballet
- Raw Metal Dance Company
- Restless Dance Company
- Strange Fruit
- Sydney Dance Company
- TasDance
- Tracks Dance Theatre
- The Dance Collective
- Visible Dance
- West Australian Ballet
- Wu Lin Dance Theatre
- youMove Dance Company

=== Defunct dance companies ===
- Aboriginal Islander Dance Theatre (1976–1998)
- The Australian Choreographic Centre (1996–2007)
- Australian Choreographic Ensemble (ACE) (1992–1998) founded by Paul Mercurio
- Australian Theatre Ballet (1955–1955)
- Ballet Australia (1960–1976)
- Ballet Guild (1946–1967)
- Ballet Victoria (1967–1976)
- Bodenwieser Ballet (1939–1959) founded by Gertrud Bodenwieser

== List of post-secondary dance education organisations ==
=== NSW ===
- Australian College of Physical Education
- Australian Dance Institute (ADi)
- Excelsia College formerly Wesley Institute
- Macquarie University (North Ryde)
- National Aboriginal Islander Skills Development Association (NAISDA)
- University of NSW (Kensington Campus)

=== Victoria ===
- Australian Ballet School
- Box Hill Institute (Centre for Performing Arts)
- Deakin University (Melbourne Campus, Burwood)
- Victorian College of the Arts (University of Melbourne)
- Victoria University (Footscray Campus)
- The Space Dance and Arts Centre

=== Queensland ===
- Aboriginal Centre for the Performing Arts
- Queensland University of Technology (Kelvin Grove Campus)

=== South Australia ===
- Adelaide College of the Arts (TAFE SA), a member of the Helpmann Academy

=== Western Australia ===
- Western Australian Academy of Performing Arts (Edith Cowan University)
- Youth Ballet Centre of Western Australia

== See also ==
- Helpmann Award for Best Ballet or Dance Work
- Australian Dance Awards
