= Australian Dance Awards =

The Australian Dance Awards recognise excellence and promote dance in Australia. They are awarded under the auspices of the Australian Dance Council (Ausdance) for performance, choreography, design, dance writing, teaching and related professions. They especially recognise and honour professional Australian dance artists who have made an outstanding contribution to Australian dance.

== History ==
The awards have their origin in the informal community Dancers' Picnic founded by Keith Bain first held in 1986 on or close to International Dance Day.

In 1997, Ausdance NSW with support from the City of Sydney and The Australian Ballet, presented the inaugural Australian Dance Awards at the Sydney Opera House. Over time, the Awards have evolved into a major industry event. For three years from 2008, the Awards were held in Melbourne and produced by Ausdance Victoria with support from the Joan and Peter Clemenger Trust and The Australian Ballet.

From 2011 until 2017 the location varied, as the awards were held by tender among the state-based organisations of the Ausdance network. In 2018 Ausdance National hosted the event at the Brisbane Powerhouse in Brisbane, Queensland, and owing to the COVID-19 pandemic in Australia, the event was held online by the national body in 2020, covering the years 2018 and 2019.

In 2022 the board of Ausdance National announced that the awards were under review and on hold.

== 2019 ==
Awards not held.

== 2018 ==
Presented by Ausdance National and Harlequin Floors, the 2018 Australian Dance Awards were presented on Saturday 8 September at Brisbane Powerhouse.

Award	Recipient	Work	Notes
Lifetime Achievement Award	Athol Willoughby OAM		
Hall of Fame	No inductees		
Services to Dance	Hilary Trotter		
Services to Dance Education	Katrina Rank		
Outstanding Achievement in Choreography	Stephanie Lake	Pile of Bones	Stephanie Lake Company
Outstanding Achievement in Youth Dance	Co3	Project NEXT	
Outstanding Achievement in Community Dance	Tracks Dance	Man Made	
Outstanding Achievement in Dance on Film or New Media	Sue Healey	Eileen	
Outstanding Achievement in Commercial Dance, Musicals or Physical Theatre	Gravity & Other Myths	BACKBONE	
Outstanding Achievement in Independent Dance	Martin del Amo	CHAMPIONS	
Outstanding Performance by a Female Dancer	Jana Castillo	construct	
Outstanding Performance by a Male Dancer	Beau Dean Riley Smith	Bennelong (2017)	Bangarra Dance Theatre
Outstanding Performance by a Company	Dancenorth	Attractor	

== 2017 ==
Presented by Ausdance Victoria, Harlequin Floors and Ausdance National, the 2017 Australian Dance Awards were presented on Sunday 24 September at Arts Centre Melbourne.

Award	Recipient	Work	Notes
Lifetime Achievement Award	Helen Herbertson		
Hall of Fame	Noel Tovey AM		
Services to Dance	Jennifer Irwin		
Services to Dance Education	Kim Walker		
Outstanding Achievement in Choreography	Lucy Guerin	The Dark Chorus	Lucy Guerin Inc.
Outstanding Achievement in Youth Dance	Catapult Dance, The Flipside Project	In Search of the Lost Things	
Outstanding Achievement in Community Dance	Liz Lea & collaborators	Great Sport!	with Canberra Dance Theatre, the National Museum of Australia, the GOLD company, Dance for Parkinson's ACT and KAGE
Outstanding Achievement in Dance on Film or New Media	The Samaya Wives	The Knowledge Between Us	
Outstanding Achievement in Commercial Dance, Musicals or Physical Theatre	Jack Chambers	Singin' in the Rain	TEG Dainty, Lunchbox Theatrical Productions, David Atkins Enterprises & Michael Cassel Group
Outstanding Achievement in Independent Dance	Liesel Zink	The Stance	
Outstanding Performance by a Female Dancer	Ako Kondo	Coppélia	The Australian Ballet
Outstanding Performance by a Male Dancer	Benjamin Hancock	The Dark Chorus	Lucy Guerin Inc
Outstanding Performance by a Company	Bangarra Dance Theatre	OUR Land People Stories	

== 2016 ==
Presented by Ausdance National and Harlequin Floors, the 2016 Australian Dance Awards were held at The State Theatre Centre of Western Australia, Perth, on Sunday 18 September at 6.30 pm as part of the MoveMe Festival 2016.

Award	Recipient	Work	Notes
Lifetime Achievement Award	Terri Charlesworth		
Services to Dance	Roy David Page		
Services to Dance Education	Dr Joan Pope OAM		
Outstanding Achievement in Choreography	Lucy Guerin	Motion Picture	Lucy Guerin Inc.
Outstanding Achievement in Youth Dance	Force Majeure & Powerhouse Youth Theatre	Jump First, Ask Later	
Outstanding Achievement in Community Dance	Dancenorth	Twilight	Cheryl Stock
Outstanding Achievement in Dance on Film or New Media	Meryl Tankard	Michelle’s Story	
Outstanding Achievement in Commercial Dance, Musicals or Physical Theatre	Circa Contemporary Circus	Il Ritorno	
Outstanding Achievement in Independent Dance	Sue Healey	On View: Live Portraits	
Outstanding Performance by a Female Dancer	Elma Kris	Lore	Bangarra Dance Theatre
Outstanding Performance by a Male Dancer	David Mack	Frame of Mind	Bangarra Dance Theatre
Outstanding Performance by a Company	Bangarra Dance Theatre	Lore	

== 2015 ==
The 2015 Australian Dance Awards were presented by Ausdance National at Her Majesty's Theatre in Adelaide on Saturday 12 September 2015.

Award	Recipient	Work	Notes
Outstanding Achievement in Youth Dance	STEPS Youth Dance Company	Fights & Flights	
Outstanding Achievement in Community Dance	Tracks Dance Company	Milpirri (Jarda–Warnpa)	
Services to Dance Education	Tanya Pearson OAM		
Outstanding Achievement in Choreography	Narelle Benjamin	Hiding in Plain Sight	
Hall of Fame	Marilyn Jones and Dr Elizabeth Cameron Dalman OAM		
Outstanding Achievement in Dance on Film or New Media	Claire Marshall	Ward of State	
Outstanding Achievement in Commercial Dance, Musicals or Physical Theatre	Gravity & Other Myths	A Simple Space	
Services to Dance	Jeff Busby		
Outstanding Achievement in Independent Dance	Torque Show and Michelle Ryan with Lavender vs Rose	Intimacy	
Lifetime Achievement Award	Marilyn Rowe OBE		
Outstanding Performance by a Female Dancer	Lucinda Dunn OAM	Manon	The Australian Ballet
Outstanding Performance by a Male Dancer	Waangenga Blanco	Patyegarang	Bangarra Dance Theatre
Outstanding Performance by a Company	Queensland Ballet	Romeo & Juliet	

== 2014 ==
The 2014 Australian Dance Awards. Held in the Joan Sutherland Theatre of the Sydney Opera House, 9 November 2014. Hosted by Francis Rings and Kip Gamblin.

Award	Recipient	Work	Notes
Outstanding Achievement in Youth or Community Dance	Buzz Dance Theatre	Look The Other Way	
Services to Dance Education	Janet Karin OAM		
Outstanding Achievement in Choreography	Stephanie Lake	Aorta	
Hall of Fame	Gailene Stock AM CBE		
Outstanding Achievement in Dance on Film or New Media	Sue Healey	On View	
Services to Dance	Annie Grieg		
Outstanding Achievement in Independent Dance	Dalia Pigram	Gudirr Gudirr	
Lifetime Achievement Award	Leigh Warren		
Outstanding Performance by a Female Dancer	Leanne Stoymenov	Cinderella	The Australian Ballet
Outstanding Performance by a Male Dancer	Jame Vu Anh Pham	Aorta	Choreographed by Stephanie Lake
Outstanding Performance by a Company	The Australian Ballet	Cinderella	

== 2013 ==
The 2013 Australian Dance Awards. Held at The Playhouse of the Canberra Theatre Centre, 6 August 2013. Hosted by Andrea Close.

Award	Recipient	Work	Notes
Outstanding Achievement in Youth or Community Dance	Tracks Dance Company	Eight to Eighty—Architecture of Age	
Services to Dance Education	Jackie Hallahan		
Outstanding Achievement in Choreography	Rafael Bonachela	2 One Another	Sydney Dance Company
Peggy Van Praagh Choreographic Fellowship	Kay Armstrong		
Outstanding Achievement in Dance on Film or New Media	Sue Healey	Virtuosi	
Services to Dance	Shane Carroll		
Outstanding Achievement in Independent Dance	Antony Hamilton	Black Project 1	
Lifetime Achievement Award	Ronne Arnold		
Outstanding Performance by a Female Dancer	Charmene Yap	2 One Another	Sydney Dance Company
Outstanding Performance by a Male Dancer	Kimball Wong	Proximity	Australian Dance Theatre
Outstanding Performance by a Company	Sydney Dance Company	2 One Another	

== 2012 ==
The 2012 Australian Dance Awards. Held at Heath Ledger Theatre, State Theatre Centre, Perth. Hosted by Verity James. Winners were:

Award	Recipient	Work	Notes
Outstanding Achievement in Youth or Community Dance	Shaun Parker and Company	Captivate	
Services to Dance Education	Sarah Calver		
Outstanding Achievement in Choreography	Natalie Weir	R & J	Expressions Dance Company
Peggy Van Praagh Choreographic Fellowship	Stephanie Lake		
Outstanding Achievement in Dance on Film / New Media	Bryan Mason & Sophie Hyde	Life in Movement	
Services to Dance	Lucinda Sharp		
Outstanding Achievement in Independent Dance	Barry Moreland & Daryl Brandwood	HELIX	
Lifetime Achievement Award	Nanette Hassell		
Outstanding Performance by a Female Dancer	Elise May	R & J	Expressions Dance Company
Outstanding Performance by a Male Dancer	Daryl Brandwood	HELIX	
Outstanding Performance by a Company	Bangarra Dance Theatre	Belong	

== 2011 ==
The 2011 Australian Dance Awards. Held at QPAC Playhouse, Brisbane. Hosted by Fenella Kernebone. Winners were:

Award	Recipient	Work	Notes
Lifetime Achievement Award	Robina Beard OAM		
Services to Dance Education	Valda Craig		
Outstanding Achievement in Youth or Community Dance	QL2 Dance	Hard Yards	
Outstanding Achievement in Choreography	Rafael Bonachela	6 Breaths	Sydney Dance Company
Outstanding Performance by a Company	Expressions Dance Company	Where the Heart Is	
Outstanding Achievement in Independent Dance	Narelle Benjamin	In Glass	
Outstanding Performance by a Female Dancer	Amy Hollingsworth	Irony of Fate	Sydney Dance Company
Outstanding Performance by a Male Dancer	Daniel Gaudiello	Coppelia	The Australian Ballet
Outstanding Performance in a Stage Musical	Alinta Chidzey	West Side Story	
Hall of Fame	Keith Bain OAM		
Award for Services to Dance	Ruth Osborne		Artistic Director – QL2 Dance (Canberra)

== 2010 ==
The 2010 Australian Dance Awards. Hosted by Neil Pigot. Held at Melbourne's Arts Centre, State Theatre. Winners were:

Award	Recipient	Work	Notes
Lifetime Achievement Award	Bill Akers AM		
Services to Dance	Stephen Page		
Services to Dance Education	Maggi Phillips		
Outstanding Achievement in Youth or Community Dance	Restless Dance Theatre	Hard Yards	
Outstanding Achievement in Choreography	Meryl Tankard & Paul White	The Oracle	
Outstanding Performance by a Company	Bangarra Dance Theatre	Fire – A Retrospective	
Outstanding Achievement in Independent Dance	Sue Peacock	Questions Without Notice	
Outstanding Performance by a Female Dancer	Lana Jones	Firebird	The Australian Ballet
Outstanding Performance by a Male Dancer	Paul White	The Oracle	
Outstanding Performance in a Stage Musical	Caroline O'Connor	Chicago	

== 2009 ==
The 2009 Australian Dance Awards winners were:

Award	Recipient	Work	Notes
Lifetime Achievement	Lucette Aldous		
Outstanding Achievement in Dance Education	Jeff Meiners		
Outstanding Achievement in Youth or Community Dance	Tracks Inc	STRUCK	Awarded for the first time in 2009
Outstanding Performance in a Stage Musical	Nick Twiney, Rarmian Newton, Rhys Kosakowski, Lochlan Denholm, Joshua Waiss Gates, Dayton Tavares, Joshua Denyer & Michael Dameski	Billy Elliot The Musical	
Outstanding Performance by a Company	Force Majeure	The Age I'm In	
Outstanding Achievement in Independent Dance	Tanja Liedtke (posthumous)	construct	
Outstanding Performance by a Female Dancer	Kristina Chan	construct	choreographed by Tanja Liedtke
Outstanding Performance by a Male Dancer	Reed Luplau	Sid's Waltzing Masquerade	Sydney Dance Company
Outstanding Achievement in Choreography	Tanja Liedtke (posthumous)	construct	
Award for Dance on Film	Chris Scherer	If The Shoe Fits	
Award for Services to Dance	Lee Christofis		A former dance critic and now curator of dance at the National Library of Australia

== 2008 ==
The 2008 Australian Dance Awards were hosted by Michael Veitch. The winners were:

Award	Recipient	Work	Notes
Lifetime Achievement	Paul Hammond OAM		
Outstanding Achievement in Dance Education	Helen Cameron		
Outstanding Performance in a Stage Musical	Hugh Jackman	The Boy From Oz	Choreographed by Kenny Ortega and Kelley Abbey
Outstanding Performance by a Company	Lucy Guerin Inc	Structure & Sadness	Choreographed by Lucy Guerin
Outstanding Achievement in Independent Dance	Shaun Parker	This Show Is About People	Produced by Marguerite Pepper Productions
Outstanding Performance by a Female Dancer	Lucinda Dunn	Don Quixote	The Australian Ballet
Outstanding Performance by a Male Dancer	Paul White	Honour Bound	Choreographed by Garry Stewart
Outstanding Achievement in Choreography	Garry Stewart	Honour Bound	Commissioned by Sydney Opera House & Malthouse Theatre
Award for Dance on Film	Sue Healey	Will Time Tell	Produced by Sue Healey
Award for Services to Dance	Dally Messenger III & Karen van Ulzen		

== 2006 ==
Hosted by Todd McKenney, Dancing with the Stars and Rachael Beck from It Takes Two. The winners were:

Award	Recipient	Work	Notes
Lifetime Achievement	Graeme Murphy and Janet Vernon		
Award for Outstanding Achievement in Dance Education	Buzz Dance Theatre		
Award for Services to Dance	Hilary Crampton		
Outstanding Achievement in Choreography	Tanja Liedtke	Twelfth Floor	
Outstanding Achievement in Independent Dance	Clare Dyson	Churchill's Black Dog	
Outstanding Performance by a Female Dancer	Kristina Chan	Twelfth Floor	Tanja Liedtke Co.
Outstanding Performance by a Male Dancer	Byron Perry	Headlock	Kage Physical Theatre
Outstanding Performance by a Company	Australian Dance Theatre	Devolution	by Garry Stewart
Award for Dance on Film	Sam James & Julie-Anne Long	Nun's Night Out	

== 2005 ==
Hosted by Chloe Dallimore, the star of the Australian production of the musical The Producers and Eddie Perfect. The winners were:

Award	Recipient	Work	Notes
Lifetime Achievement Award	Kathryn Lowe		
Outstanding Achievement in Dance Education	Jenny Kinder		
Outstanding Performance by a Female Dancer	Margrete Helgeby	Aqueous	
Outstanding Performance by a Male Dancer	Dein Perry	Tap Dogs	
Outstanding Performance by a Company	Force Majeure	Already Elsewhere	Choreographed by Kate Champion
Outstanding Achievement in Choreography	Wendy Houstoun, Narelle Benjamin, Brian Carbee, Julie-Anne Long & Michael Whaites Graeme Murphy	In the Dark Grand	
Outstanding Achievement in Independent Dance	Julie-Anne Long	The Nun's Picnic	
Award for Services to Dance	Mark Gordon		
Award for Dance Film	Gina Czarnecki	Nascent	Choreographed by Garry Stewart
Outstanding Performance in a Stage Musical	Josef Brown in	Dirty Dancing	
Inducted to the Hall of Fame.	Colin Peasley, John Lanchbery and Ross Stretton		

== 2004 ==
Award	Recipient	Work	Notes
Lifetime achievement award	Julie Dyson AM		National executive officer of Ausdance since the Australia Council began funding the organisation in 1985 also received the Sidney Myer Performing Arts Award for Administration in 1994
Outstanding Achievement in Dance Education	Michelle Saunders		General Manager of STEPS Youth Dance Company
Outstanding achievement in choreography	Frances Rings	Unaipon	Bangarra Dance Theatre
Outstanding Performance by a Company	Australian Dance Theatre	Held	Choreographed by Garry Stewart.
Outstanding Performance by a female dancer	Larissa McGowan	Held	Australian Dance Theatre
Outstanding Performance by a male dancer	Patrick Thaiday Paul Zivkovich	Unaipon Held	Bangarra Dance Theatre Australian Dance Theatre
Outstanding Performance in a stage musical	Chloe Dallimore	The Producers	
Outstanding achievement in independent dance	Kate Denborough	Nowhere Man	Kage Physical Theatre
Award for services to dance	No award		
Award for dance on film	I Dream of Augustine		Concept & Direction: Cordelia Beresford Choreography & Performance: Narelle Benjamin

== 2003 ==
Hosted by Libbi Gorr. The winners were:

Award	Recipient	Work	Notes
Lifetime achievement award	Cheryl Stock		As a performer, choreographer, artistic director, advocate, researcher, academic, and leader in tertiary dance education
Outstanding Achievement in Dance Education	Keith Bain OAM		
Outstanding achievement in choreography	Graeme Murphy AM	Swan Lake	Sydney Dance Company
Outstanding Performance by a Company	Sydney Dance Company	Underland	Choreographed by Graeme Murphy.
Outstanding Performance by a female dancer	Simone Goldsmith	Swan Lake	The Australian Ballet
Outstanding Performance by a male dancer	Bradley Chatfield	Underland	Sydney Dance Company
Outstanding Performance in a stage musical	Joshua Horner	Tivoli	Sydney Dance Company
Outstanding achievement in independent dance	Helen Herbertson and Ben Cobham	Morphia Series (Delirium and Morphia)	
Award for services to dance	Michelle Potter		
Award for dance on film	Sue Healey	Fine Line	

== 2002 ==
Award	Recipient	Work	Notes
Lifetime achievement award	Meryl Tankard		
Outstanding Achievement in Dance Education	Nanette Hassall		Founder of Dance Works and currently Head of Dance at the Western Australian Academy of Performing Arts
Outstanding achievement in choreography	Garry Stewart	The Age of Unbeauty	(Australian Dance Theatre)
Outstanding Performance by a Company	Australian Dance Theatre	The Age of Unbeauty	Choreographed by Garry Stewart.
Outstanding Performance by a female dancer	Roz Hervey	Same Same But Different	Force Majeure
Outstanding Performance by a male dancer	Dean Walsh	The Age of Unbeauty	Australian Dance Theatre
Outstanding Performance in a stage musical	Todd McKenney	Singin' in the Rain	
Award for services to dance	Ian McRae		
Award for dance on film	No award		

== 2001 ==
Award	Recipient	Work	Notes
Lifetime achievement award	Shirley McKechnie OAM		Professorial Fellow at the Victorian College of the Arts and has pioneered of Australian contemporary dance in
Outstanding Achievement in Dance Education	Margaret Markham		Fellow of the Australian College of Educators and founder of The McDonald College in 1984.
Outstanding achievement in choreography	Graeme Murphy AM	Tivoli	Artistic director of the now Sydney Dance Company, choreographed over forty works and was awarded the OM for his services to dance in Australia.
Outstanding Performance by a Company	The Australian Ballet and Sydney Dance Company	Tivoli	Choreographed by Graeme Murphy as a joint production
Outstanding Performance by an Individual	Harry Haythorne	Tivoli	Sydney Dance Company
Outstanding Performance in a stage musical	Tracey Carrodus	Tivoli	Sydney Dance Company
Award for services to dance	Lucette Aldous		Ballerina and an inspirational teacher and mentor to students at the Western Australian Academy of Performing Arts
Award for dance on film	Boro's Ballet		Directed by Michelle Potter and Sally Jackson Produced by ScreenSound Australia; A documentary charting the work of choreographer Edouard Borovansky and the foundation of the Boronovsky Ballet

== 2000 ==
Award	Recipient	Work	Notes
Lifetime achievement award	Kira Bousloff OAM		
Outstanding Achievement in Dance Education	Martin Rubenstein OAM		
Outstanding achievement in choreography	Ted Bransden	Carmen	West Australian Ballet
Outstanding Performance by a Company	The Australian Ballet	In the Middle Somewhat Elevated	Choreographed by William Forsythe
Outstanding Performance by an Individual	Steven Heathcote AM	Don Quixote	The Australian Ballet
Outstanding Performance in a stage musical	Todd McKenney	The Boy from Oz	
Award for services to dance	Julie Dyson		National Executive Officer of the Australian Dance Council
Award for dance on film	No award		

== 1999 ==
Award	Recipient	Work	Notes
Lifetime achievement award	Keith Bain OAM		Fulfilled roles as dancer, teacher and choreographer and administrator over five decades, founder the Dancer's Picnic
Outstanding Achievement in Dance Education	Professor Susan Street		Performer, choreographer, educator and administrator.
Outstanding achievement in choreography	Leigh Warren	Shimmer	
Outstanding Performance by a Company	Leigh Warren & Dancers	Masterpieces of the 20th Century and Shimmer	
Outstanding Performance by an Individual	Delia Silvan	Silent Cries	Leigh Warren & Dancers
Outstanding Performance in a stage musical	Caroline O'Connor	Chicago	A dancer, actress and singer in the London West End and Australia with roles in a number of classic stage musicals
Award for services to dance	Kristian Fredrikson		As a costume designer
Award for dance on film	Restoration		Direction: Cordelia Beresford Choreography & Performance: Narelle Benjamin and Solon Ulbrich

== 1998 ==
Award	Recipient	Work	Notes
Lifetime achievement award	Margaret Scott OBE Valrene Tweedie OAM		
Outstanding Achievement in Dance Education	Joan Halliday OAM and Monica Halliday OAM		
Outstanding achievement in choreography	Dein Perry Stephen Baynes		
Outstanding Performance by an Individual	Damien Welch Djakapurra Munyarryun		
Award for services to dance	Tony Geeves		Author of Safe Dance I and II

== 1997 ==
Award	Recipient	Work	Notes
Lifetime achievement award	Elizabeth Cameron Dalman OAM Laurel Martyn OBE		
Outstanding Achievement in Dance Education	Shirley McKechnie OAM Ann Roberts		founder of Dancenorth
Outstanding achievement in choreography	Stephen Page Gideon Obarzanek		Artistic Director of Bangarra Dance Theatre Artistic Director of Chunky Move
Award for services to dance	Jill Sykes AM Dally Messenger		Dance writer of The Sydney Morning Herald Founder of Dance Australia
