= Kristian Fredrikson =

Australian artist

- Born: Kristian Adrian Sams; 1940; Wellington
- Died: 10 November 2005 (aged 64–65)
- Known for: Costume and stage design for ballet and opera
- Notable work: Design for Turandot (1991), The Nutcracker (1992), Salome (1993) and Swan Lake (2002)
- Awards: Australian Dance Award 1999 for Services to Dance

Kristian Fredrikson (1940 – 10 November 2005) was a New Zealand-born Australian stage and costume designer working in ballet, opera and other performing arts. His work was acclaimed for its sumptuous, jewel-like quality, and a sensuous level of detail.

== Early life and training ==
Fredrikson may have given erroneous information about his birth name and family lineage that has been repeated in various media. Author Michelle Potter published a book about him in 2020 and established that he was born in Wellington as Frederick John Sams, and his father was Frederick Spencer Sams (1910-1996) and was born in New Zealand. In 1962 he took on the name Kristian Adrian Fredrikson, prior to that he signed his name F. J. S.

== Personality ==
An intensely private, solitary figure, Fredrikson spent the last years living alone in a small dark flat in Kings Cross, Sydney. He felt he had been a 'goth' long before they were fashionable. As a child, he and his mother had been physically attacked in Christchurch for being Catholic in a Protestant area, and the experience had contributed to his feelings of alienation from mainstream society.

His aesthetic sense was cultivated at school by two nuns. The mother superior gave him, he said, a "sexy, sensual, erotic, decadent book about the pleasure of the flesh, the pleasure of colour, of jewels, of life. She gave it all to me and said 'You can read that, but don't tell anyone."

Fredrikson said his art work had "grown out of my most private sexual being. Translated, I suppose that means that's how I ran into Tchaikovsky." His deep love for the music of Tchaikovsky coloured his life. Dame Peggy van Praagh, who commissioned his first design for the Australian Ballet, told him he had to spend a weekend with an older male designer who lived in Sydney's Blue Mountains. Fredrikson said she told him: "The first thing is, he'll throw you on the carpet and rape you." He did, and Fredrikson believed it was "all part of the deal. It seemed to be like part of the Mephistophelean code. That's what you do."

== Stage design ==
Fredrikson began his career as a newspaper critic and journalist and began taking art classes at Wellington Polytechnic College while writing for Wellington newspapers, and then became apprenticed to a local theatrical designer.

His first stage design was for The Wintergarden in 1963. His costume design was described as "sumptuous, jewelled and beautiful, while allowing the wearer complete freedom of movement". He had a long association with the Royal New Zealand Ballet, the Australian Ballet and Opera Australia. He designed operas including Lucrezia Borgia for productions starring Dame Joan Sutherland. He also worked on the 2000 Sydney Summer Olympics opening ceremony.

In 2005 Fredriksen realised a long-held ambition to design all three of Pyotr Ilyich Tchaikovsky's ballets. He designed The Nutcracker for the Royal New Zealand Ballet, Swan Lake for the Houston Ballet, and The Sleeping Beauty for the Australian Ballet. This last work was the Australian Ballet's largest ever production, requiring 300 costumes and four major sets, and was still touring at the time of Fredrikson's death.

=== List of stage designs ===
- Australian Ballet - Cinderella, Coppelia, The Nutcracker
- Australian Ballet - Swan Lake (with Graeme Murphy)
- Australian Ballet/Sydney Dance Company - Tivoli (with Graeme Murphy)
- Australian Opera - Turandot, The Merry Widow, Salome
- Houston Ballet - Swan Lake
- Royal New Zealand Ballet - Swan Lake, Peter Pan, A Christmas Carol
- South Australian Opera - Verdi's Macbeth
- Sydney Dance Company - King Roger, Body of Work
- Sydney Theatre Company - Macbeth, The School for Scandal, A Doll’s House
- Victoria State Opera - Don Carlos
- Victoria State Opera - Carmen
- West Australian Opera - Albert Herring

== Film and television design ==
In Australia Fredriksen created costumes and undertook production design for a number of film and television productions including costumes for the feature films Undercover, Sky Pirate and Short Changed and production design for television series Vietnam, the mini-series Dirtwater Dynasty and mini-series The Shiralee.

== Collections ==
Examples of Fredrikson's works are held by Arts Centre Melbourne, the Museum of New Zealand Te Papa Tongarewa and The Dowse Art Museum. An exhibition of his costume work for the Royal New Zealand Ballet was staged by The Dowse Art Museum in 2011 and subsequently toured to other regional art galleries in New Zealand.

== Recognition ==
Fredriksen received four Erik Design Awards in Australia and Green Room Awards for After Venice (Sydney Dance Company - 1985), King Roger (1991), Turandot (1991), The Nutcracker (1992), Salome (1993) and Swan Lake (2002).

In 1999 he received the Australian Dance Award for Services to Dance.

The Kristian Fredrikson Scholarship for design in the performing arts was established in his honour in 2008.

He has been written about in a book published by Melbourne Books Kristian Fredrikson: Designer by Michelle Potter in 2020.

== Death ==
Once a heavy smoker, Fredrikson's lungs were weakened by emphysema. He died in Sydney of lung failure, at about age 65, following complications from pneumonia.
