= Shirley McKechnie =

Australian dancer and educator (1926–2022)

Shirley McKechnie AO FAHA
- Born: Shirley Elizabeth Gorham; 18 June 1926; Melbourne, Victoria, Australia
- Died: 5 September 2022 (aged 96); Melbourne, Victoria, Australia
- Occupations: Dancer, choreographer

Shirley Elizabeth McKechnie AO FAHA (18 June 1926 – 5 September 2022) was an Australian pioneer of contemporary dance as a dancer, choreographer, director and educator.

== Early life and education ==
Born Shirley Elizabeth Gorham was born on 18 June 1926 in Melbourne, McKechnie was educated at Albion State School, followed by Williamstown High School. She took dance lessons from the age of four and began ballet at ten. On finishing school, she worked at the Melbourne and Metropolitan Board of Works, but continued her dance training in the Bodenweiser technique.

== Career ==
McKechnie opened her first dance school in 1945. In 1948 she married Ken McKechnie and had two children before establishing another dance school in 1955.

In 1963 she founded the Australian Contemporary Dance Theatre and served as its artistic director until 1973. After studying dance in the US and Canada, including three months at the Juilliard School in New York, she developed the curriculum for Australia's first degree course in dance at Rusden College (now Deakin University) in 1975. Along with Dame Peggy van Praagh, she was one of the co-founders of Ausdance.

She was interviewed by James Murdoch for an episode of "Dance: Videos of Australian dancers and choreographers" in 1988. She herself interviewed a number of dancers, including Meryl Tankard and Graeme Murphy, for the Australian choreographers oral history project from 1990.

== Death and legacy ==
McKechnie died in Melbourne on 5 September 2022, at the age of 96.

A collection of her papers is held by the National Library of Australia as part of its "Keep Dancing" project.

== Awards and recognition ==
McKechnie was awarded an Order of Australia Medal in 1987 and was promoted to Officer in the 2013 Queen's Birthday Honours for "distinguished service to the performing arts, particularly dance, to the education and development of dancers and choreographers, and to research".

She received the Centenary Medal in 2001 for "service to Australian society and the humanities in the study of dance".

She was awarded the Kenneth Myer Medallion for the Performing Arts in 1993.

In 2001 she received a lifetime achievement award at the Australian Dance Awards.

She was elected an Honorary Fellow of the Australian Academy of the Humanities in 1998 and was awarded an honorary degree of Doctor of Visual and Performing Arts by the University of Melbourne.
