= Scott Davie (pianist) =

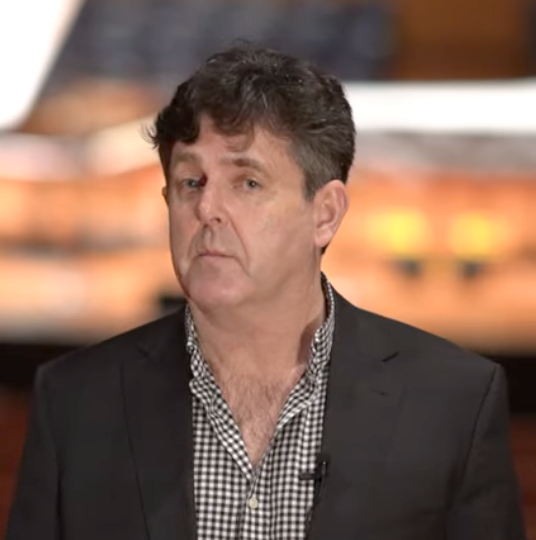
- In an ANU video in 2022

Background information
- Born: 1966 (age 59–60); Orange, New South Wales, Australia
- Origin: Sydney, Australia
- Genre: Art music
- Instrument: Piano
- Website: scottdavie.com.au

Scott Davie (born 1966) is an Australian concert pianist based in Sydney. Davie is currently a piano lecturer at the ANU School of Music and is the director of the university's Keyboard Institute.

== Biography ==
Davie was born in 1966, in Orange, New South Wales, and moved to Sydney at a young age. He was a student at the Conservatorium High School, where he won numerous awards and prizes. He later studied as an undergraduate student at the Sydney Conservatorium of Music, before relocating to London, studying at the London Guildhall School of Music and Drama. He completed his undergraduate degree at Sydney Conservatorium of Music, where he later completed both masters and a PhD, focusing on melodic language of Sergei Rachmaninoff. His teachers include Gerard Willems, Leslie Howard and Geoffrey Parsons.

=== Rachmaninoff manuscript discovery ===
In 2003, while researching Rachmaninoff material at the Library of Congress, Davie discovered a two-page sketch of a Rachmaninoff piano piece. While he was able to make a pencil copy, it was not until later he realized that the sketch was complete. Davie was given permission to make use of the piece by the composer's great-granddaughter, Natalie Wanamaker Javier, while attending the 2006 International Rachmaninoff Conference in Amsterdam. The piece was recorded and released by ABC Classics on his Pictures from an Exhibition CD. Since then, the piece has been recorded by Vladimir Ashkenazy and released by Decca.

=== Performances of Rachmaninoff ===
Davie specializes in the music of Rachmaninoff and has released two discs on ABC Classics featuring the composer's music. In late November 2012, he gave the Australian premiere performances of the original version of Rachmaninoff's 4th Piano Concerto with the Sydney Symphony Orchestra and Vladimir Ashkenazy, to capacity audiences at the Sydney Opera House.

=== Grand ===
In 2005 Davie collaborated with Graeme Murphy, Janet Vernon and Sydney Dance Company on Grand, a full-length choreographed piano recital with the pianist performing live on stage.

Over 80 performances were given throughout Australia, and the production also featured at the Shanghai International Arts Festival in 2006 and toured the US in 2007.
