= Graeme Koehne =

Australian composer and music educator

Graeme John Koehne AO (born 3 August 1956), is an Australian composer and music educator. He is best known for his orchestral and ballet scores, which are characterised by direct communicative style and embrace of tertian harmony. His orchestral trilogy Unchained Melody, Powerhouse, and Elevator Music makes allusions to Hollywood film score traditions, cartoon music, popular Latin music and other dance forms.

== Life and career ==
Koehne was born in Adelaide. He completed his undergraduate and post-graduate studies at the Elder Conservatorium of Music in that city, studying composition with Richard Meale – a pupil of Winifred Burston, who had been a pupil of Ferruccio Busoni.

In 1982 he won the Young Composers Prize at that year's Adelaide Festival, gaining him national attention for his orchestral work Rainforest. In 1984, Koehne was awarded a Harkness Fellowship to work at the School of Music, Yale University. Here he studied with Louis Andriessen and Jacob Druckman. For two years of the fellowship he also took private lessons with Virgil Thomson.

He returned to Australia in 1986 and was appointed Lecturer in Composition at the Elder Conservatorium of Music. In the early 1990s he collaborated with librettist Louis Nowra on the chamber opera Love Burns, which was premiered at the 1992 Adelaide Festival. Around this time, he commenced his long and fruitful collaboration with choreographer Graeme Murphy, which included a children's ballet based on Oscar Wilde's The Selfish Giant and the full-length work Nearly Beloved.

From 2005 to 2021, Koehne was Head of Composition at the Elder Conservatorium of Music. Until recently he also chaired the Music Board of the Australia Council and was a board member of the council.

Graeme is married to former model, now advertising Creative Director of Oranje Creative, Melinda Parent. Graeme and Melinda have one son, Willem Lukas Christiaan (born 2007).

== Works ==
Ballets

- Nearly Beloved (1986; Sydney Dance Company)
- Nocturnes, 1914 (The Australian Ballet)
- The Selfish Giant (1983; Sydney Dance Company)
- Tivoli (2001; Sydney Dance Company/The Australian Ballet co-production)

Chamber music

- String Quartet
- To His Servant Bach God Grants a Final Glimpse – The Morning Star (1989; also transcribed as organ trio). The work references Spitta's Johann Sebastian Bach: "...so that Bach was henceforth totally blind... On July 18 he suddenly found his eyesight restored, and could bear daylight; but this was life's parting greeting...he died on Tuesday, July 28, 1750..."

Concertos

- InFlight Entertainment (2000, oboe concerto)

Orchestral

- Rainforest (c. 1982)
- Unchained Melody (1991)
- Powerhouse (1993)
- Elevator Music (1997)
- Way Out West (2000)
- Sleep of Reason (2008)
- Song of the Open Road (2017)

=== Albums ===
List of albums, with selected details
Title	Details
String Quartets (with The Australian String Quartet, Richard Mills & Richard Meale)	Released: 1994; Format: CD; Label: ABC Classics (442 347-2)
Powerhouse ∙ Three Poems of Byron Cappriccio ∙ Unchained Melody (Adelaide Symphony Orchestra, cond. David Porcelijn, Janos Furst)	Released: 1995, 2000; Format: CD; Label: ABC (8.770016)
Inflight Entertainment ∙ Powerhouse ∙ Elevator Music (with Diana Doherty & Sydney Symphony)	Released: 2005; Format: CD; Label: Naxos (8.555847)
Tivoli Dances (with Tasmanian Symphony Orchestra & Richard Mills)	Released: 2008; Format: CD; Label: ABC Classics (476 650-2)
Time Is a River (with Tasmanian Symphony Orchestra)	Released: 2015; Format: CD; Label: ABC Classics (481 148-0)

== Honours and awards ==
In 2001, Koehne was awarded the Centenary Medal.

In the 2014 Queen's Birthday Honours List, Koehne was appointed as an Officer of the Order of Australia (AO), "for distinguished service to the performing arts as a composer of chamber, concert and ballet music, and through substantial contributions as an educator and arts administrator."

=== APRA Awards ===
The APRA Awards are held in Australia and New Zealand by the Australasian Performing Right Association to recognise songwriting skills, sales and airplay performance by its members annually.

Year	Nominee / work	Award	Result	Ref.
2009	Tivoli Dances	Orchestral Work of the Year	Won	
2009	Palm Court Suite	Orchestral Work of the Year	Nominated	

=== Bernard Heinze Memorial Award ===
The Sir Bernard Heinze Memorial Award is given to a person who has made an outstanding contribution to music in Australia.

Year	Nominee / work	Award	Result	Ref.
2003	Graeme Koehne	Sir Bernard Heinze Memorial Award	awarded	<
