= Dance Council =

Dance Council may refer to:

- Australian Dance Council, a national dance advocacy organisation for dancers, choreographers, directors and educators
- International Dance Council, an umbrella organization for all forms of dance in the world
- Pittsburgh Dance Council, a presenting organization based in downtown Pittsburgh, United States
- World Dance Council, a dance organization
