= Tivoli (musical) =

Australian dance musical

- Poster of Brisbane season
- Premiere: 18 May 2001: State Theatre, Melbourne
- Productions: 2001 Australian tour; 2003 Sydney

Tivoli is an Australian dance musical that pays tribute to the Tivoli variety and revue circuit. It was directed and choreographed by Graeme Murphy from a scenario by Murphy and Kristian Fredrikson, with dialogue by Linda Nagle and Paul Chubb. Music incorporated existing songs from Tivoli productions, original songs by Max Lambert and Linda Nagle, and an original musical score by Graeme Koehne.

== Synopsis ==
Interweaving backstage scenes with onstage acts, the story opens in 1906, when the main character, a starry-eyed Jack, lands a job as a stagehand. This marks the beginning of a lifelong love affair with 'the Tiv' across periods of great social change for Australia – two World Wars, the roaring 20s and the Depression years, exotic revues of the 1950s and finally the advent of television.

== Productions ==
Tivoli was first produced in 2001 as a co-production between the Sydney Dance Company and The Australian Ballet, touring Melbourne, Adelaide, Sydney, Brisbane and Canberra. A 2003 return season played at the Capitol Theatre in Sydney.

== Recordings ==
There is no official cast recording, although a private recording exists. A symphonic version of Koehne's score, Tivoli Dances, was recorded by the Tasmanian Symphony Orchestra conducted by Richard Mills and released in 2008.

A half-hour documentary, Tivoli: the making of a Dance Musical, produced and directed by Philippe Charluet was broadcast on the ABC.

== Awards and nominations ==
Tivoli received four 2001 Australian Dance Awards, including Outstanding Performance by a Company, Outstanding Achievement in Choreography, Outstanding Performance by a Male Dancer (Harry Haythorne) and Outstanding Achievement in Commercial Dance, Musicals or Physical Theatre (Tracey Carrodus).

It received four nominations at the 2002 Helpmann Awards, for Best Direction of a Musical (Graeme Murphy), Best Ballet or Dance Work, Best Female Dancer in a Dance or Physical Theatre Production (Tracey Carrodus) and Best Male Dancer in a Dance or Physical Theatre Production (Josh Horner).
