= Lucinda Dunn =

Australian ballerina

Lucinda Dunn (OAM) OAM
- Born: Lucinda Dunn; 10 December 1973 (age 52); Sydney, Australia
- Occupations: Ballet dancer (active until 2014); Female graduate year teacher at The Australian Ballet School (2026 - present)
- Spouse: Danilo Radojevic (m. 1997)
- Children: 2

Lucinda Dunn OAM (born 10 December 1973) is an Australian retired ballerina and current Principal Ballet Teacher with Dance North Academy and Ambassador of The Ballet Society. She was formerly Artistic Director at the Tanya Pearson Academy.

Dunn was trained initially at Tanya Pearson Academy, before proceeding to train at the Royal Ballet School in London after winning a scholarship at the Prix De Lausanne in 1988, age 15. At the age of 17 Dunn signed a contract with the Australian Ballet Company in 1991. She stayed with the Australian Ballet throughout her entire career, being promoted to a principal dancer in 2002. Dunn is currently Australia’s longest-serving ballerina, after spending 25 years with the Australian Ballet, she performed her final role in April 2014.

== Early life ==
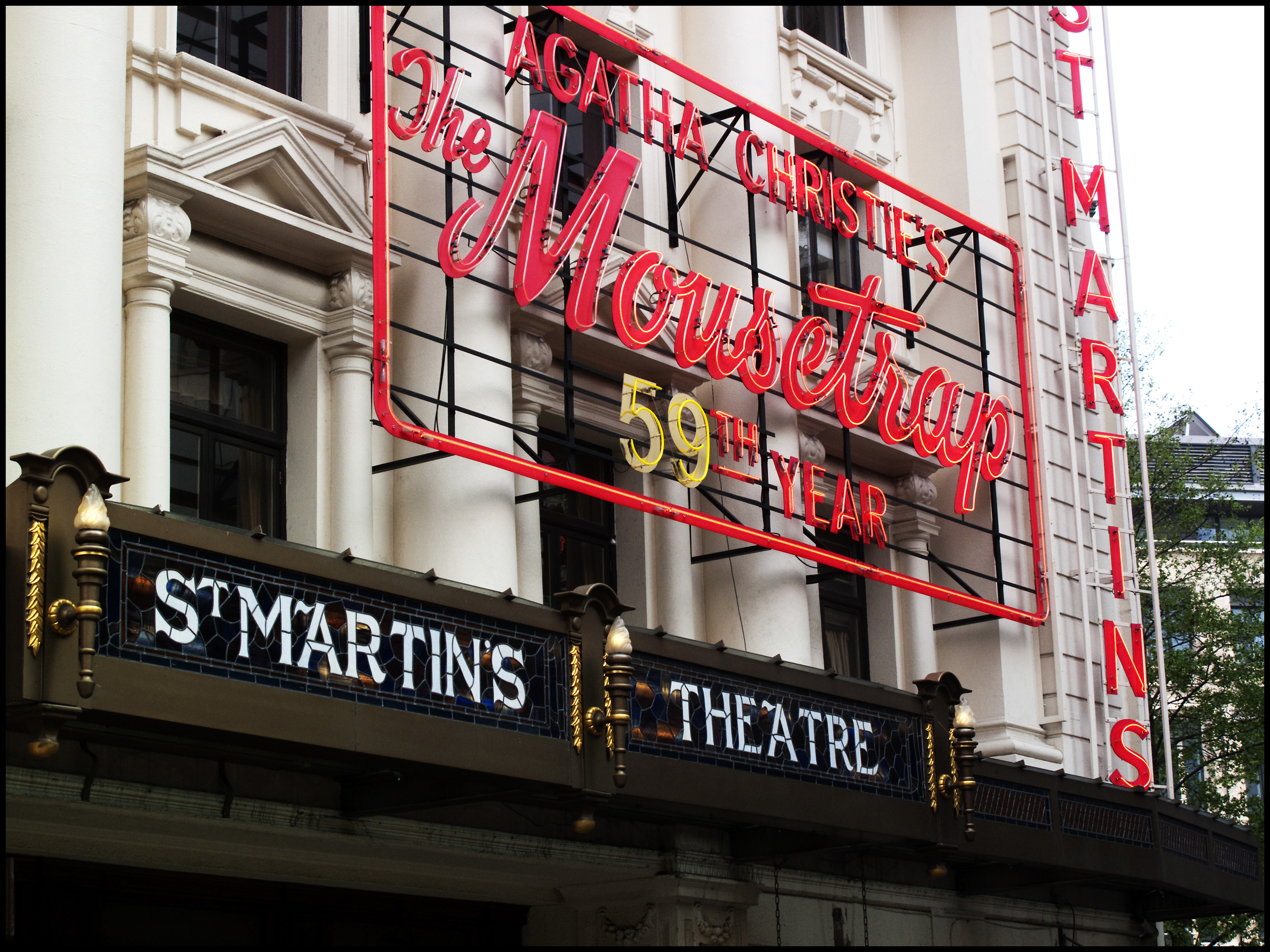
London's West End where Dunn's mother performed for many years

Dunn was born in Sydney, Australia on 10 December 1973. Her mother, who raised her and her brother, was a performer in West End Musicals in London. Dunn often refers to her mother’s career as inspiring her own. Dunn began training in various styles of dance from the age of four, including jazz, tap, ballet and contemporary – mainly after school. She describes her childhood as being “an idyllic, suburban, happy childhood. I had everything I could have possibly wanted or ever asked for.”

== Career ==
=== Training and development ===
Beginning her training at the age of four, Dunn initiated her pre-career development in various styles of dance. Although she was trained in jazz, contemporary, tap, hip hop and singing – her emphasis on ballet did not occur until she moved her training to the Tanya Pearson Classical Coaching Academy at the age of 13. Under the guise of Tanya Pearson OAM, Dunn grew her repertoire and was accepted to compete in the prestigious 1989 Prix De Lausanne in Switzerland. After winning the Prix Espoir, Dunn, age 15 at the time, received a scholarship to study at the Royal Ballet School in London, England as a result of one of the Royal Ballet Company’s talent scouts recognising her talent throughout the week-long competition.

After accepting her scholarship in 1989, Dunn moved to London to train with the Royal Ballet School for two years. During these two years she gained experience on stage, performing as a guest with the junior corps de ballet in companies such as the Birmingham Royal Ballet.

Succeeding her training at the Royal Ballet School between 1989 and 1991, she was offered two contracts on graduating. These were with the Birmingham Royal Ballet and with The Australian Ballet. She accepted the latter and began as a member of the Australian Ballet Company in 1991.

=== The Australian Ballet Company ===
After accepting the Australian Ballet Company’s offer to train with them, Dunn began her career as a member of the Corps De Ballet, however rapidly accelerated up the ranks. After one year with the most junior rank of a ballet company, Dunn was promoted to Coryphée in 1992, then in 1993 to soloist. In her 4th year with the company Dunn was titled a Senior Artist in 1995, followed by her acceleration to Principal Artist with the Australian Ballet Company in 2002. She remained a principal artist for 13 years.

Dunn’s first performance as a Soloist was as Aurora, Sleeping Beauty, a role given to her after only 18 months with the company. From there she has performed the majority of all classical roles, including Odette in Swan Lake, Sugar Plum Fairy in The Nutcracker, Giselle in Giselle and Kitri in Don Quixote. In total Dunn has performed over 60 roles from over 93 different ballets. Dunn describes one of her highlights being performing Odette in Swan lake when she was age 39. Although she received advice to perform as a guest artist with whichever company was performing Swan Lake in order to book this role, she believed “If I wasn’t meant to do it, I wasn’t meant to do it.” In 2012 Stephen Baynes of the Australian Ballet created a classical interpretation of Swan Lake, casting Dunn to play Odette. Her final role with the Australian Ballet was as Manon in L’histoire de Manon. This role was chosen by her to be her final role as she described; “I wanted to end my career on a wonderful ballet that suits my physicality.” In total Dunn has performed in 93 ballets across the course of her career.

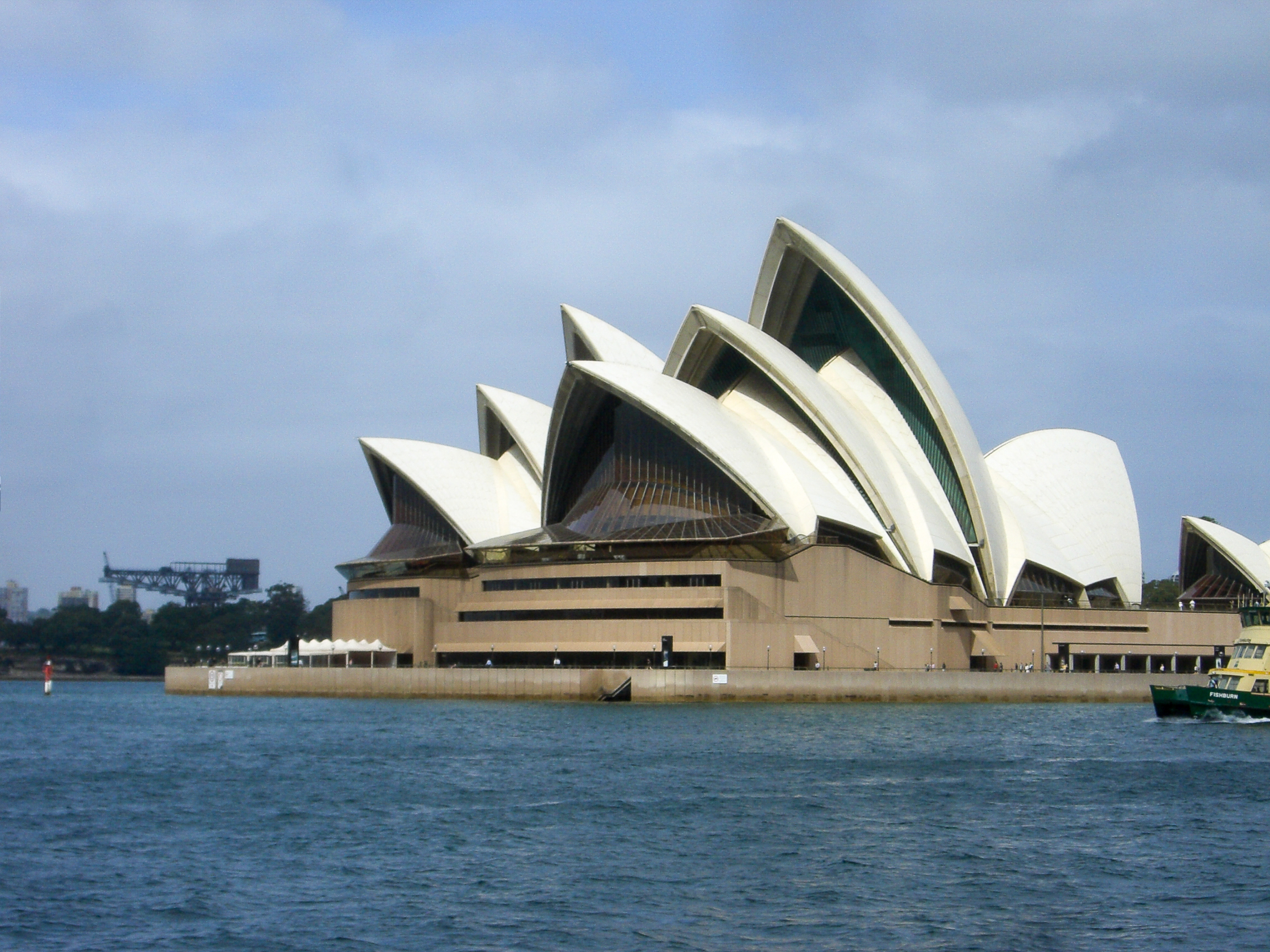
Sydney Opera House where Dunn's final performance took place

Dunn came to the decision to retire while dancing her debut in Manon in Brisbane early 2014. She describes Manon as “a beautiful ballet to end on. It’s a fantastic vehicle to display all the emotions and physically and the artistry that has accompanied my career, a fitting way to finish.” Additionally, Dunn describes the growing presence and emphasis of her family life as a contribution to her decision to retire – stating “I want to spend time with my husband and my daughters. I want to put on my runners and power down the beach. Some more outside activities might be nice! I’m looking forward rather than back.” Dunn concluded her final ballet with a 10 minute standing ovation at the Sydney Opera House on the 23rd of April 2014.

=== Work with other companies ===
Although Dunn only had a contract with the Australian Ballet Company, she also featured as a guest artist throughout her career. Whilst training at the Royal Ballet School she performed with the Birmingham Royal Ballet. Additionally, Dunn has made appearances with the Royal Danish Ballet, Le Jeune Ballet de France, World Ballet Festival, The Wheeldon Company, and the Sydney City Youth Ballet Company.

Throughout her career Dunn was faced with a number of injuries. The year Dunn turned 16 and was training at the Royal Ballet School in London she suffered a spinal fracture and spent more than 12 weeks in a full-body cast. Since then she suffered an ankle injury resulting in surgery, strained knee ligaments and torn calf muscle.

=== Career off stage ===
Succeeding her retirement, Dunn continued to remain connected to the dance industry. In January 2015 she returned to Tanya Pearson Classical Coaching Academy in St Leonards, Sydney (the same studio at which she trained) as the new artistic director. Dunn describes her teaching focus as being ““pure, clean classical ballet technique. Explaining correct muscle use and [a] way of working that each student understands and can implement to their own body.” Dunn received the offer to take over as artistic director while she was still dancing with the Australian Ballet Company. Currently Dunn teaches a variety of classes, as well specialized coaching for students at the academy training for large competitions, such as the Youth America Grand Prix and the Prix De Lausanne. Dunn’s role at the Tanya Pearson Academy also involves a variety of mentoring aspects. Dunn describes Tanya Pearson Classical Coaching Academy as “having such a high reputation, and my goal is to uphold this expectation and to excel even further.”

Dunn has been described as “the Academy’s most high-profile graduate.” She has stated that one of her proudest teaching achievements was guiding students from the Tanya Pearson Classical Coaching Academy directly into professional careers with Australian ballet companies.

Additionally, Dunn has taken various masterclasses in small local studios around New South Wales. Danae Cantwell School of Dance hosted various workshops with Dunn coaching in Kempsey.

Dunn has worked as an artistic director – she directed The Sydney City Youth Ballet's production of Triple Bill in recent seasons. The production travelled across New South Wales – including Sydney, Port Macquarie and Bowral. Dunn often works in conjunction with her husband Radojevic – who is currently the associate artistic director of the Australian Ballet Company.

She is currently the Principal Ballet Teacher of Dance North Academy in the Northern Beaches, New South Wales and an Ambassador for The Ballet Society.

== Personal life ==
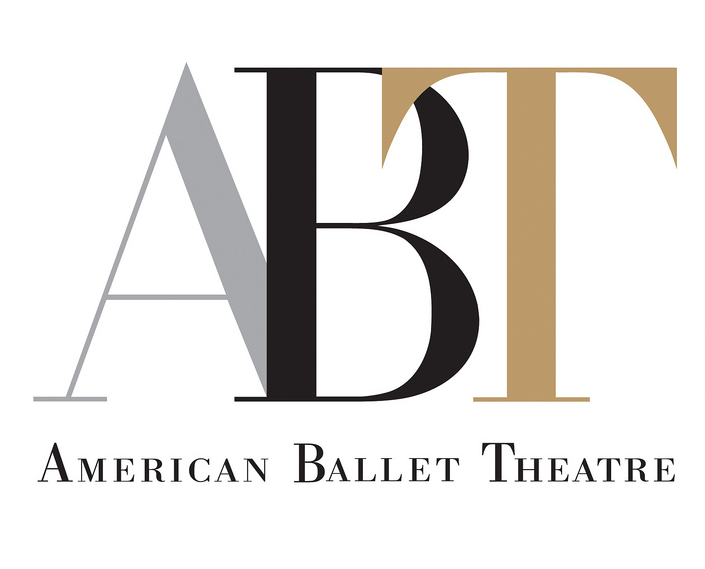
American Ballet Theatre's (Informally known as the ABT) logo, whose Dunn's Husband used to perform with

Dunn is married to Danilo Radojevic, a former dancer with the American Ballet Theatre. Since retiring, Radojevic is currently the associate artistic director of the Australian Ballet Company. The couple have two young daughters, Claudia (16), and Ava (13), born in 2008 and 2011 respectively. Dunn describes balancing her family life as being “chaotic” – Describing how during her career she would “come home from a show and my five year old’s would be up at 10.45pm having a tea party.” The family currently live in the North part of Sydney, Australia.

== Awards ==
Aside from Dunn’s vast repertoire, she has received a number of awards throughout her career. These include:

- Medal of The Order of Australia — Dunn was awarded an OAM for her services to dance and the dance industry in 2014 and recalls it as being “one of her favourite moments as a dancer.”
- Australian Dance Award for Outstanding Performance
- Green Room Award for Best Female Dancer
- Participated in breaking the world record for most ballerinas en pointe at one time — in March 2017 Dunn travelled to the Victorian Dance Festival to participate with 300 other dancers to break the world record for most ballerinas en pointe at one time. Dunn described the experience as being “thrilling.”

=== Mo Awards ===
The Australian Entertainment Mo Awards (commonly known informally as the Mo Awards), were annual Australian entertainment industry awards. They recognise achievements in live entertainment in Australia from 1975 to 2016. Lucinda Dunn won one award in that time.

Year	Nominee / work	Award	Result (wins only)
2007	Lucinda Dunn	Dance Performer of the Year	Won
