= Descendance =

Australian Aboriginal dance company

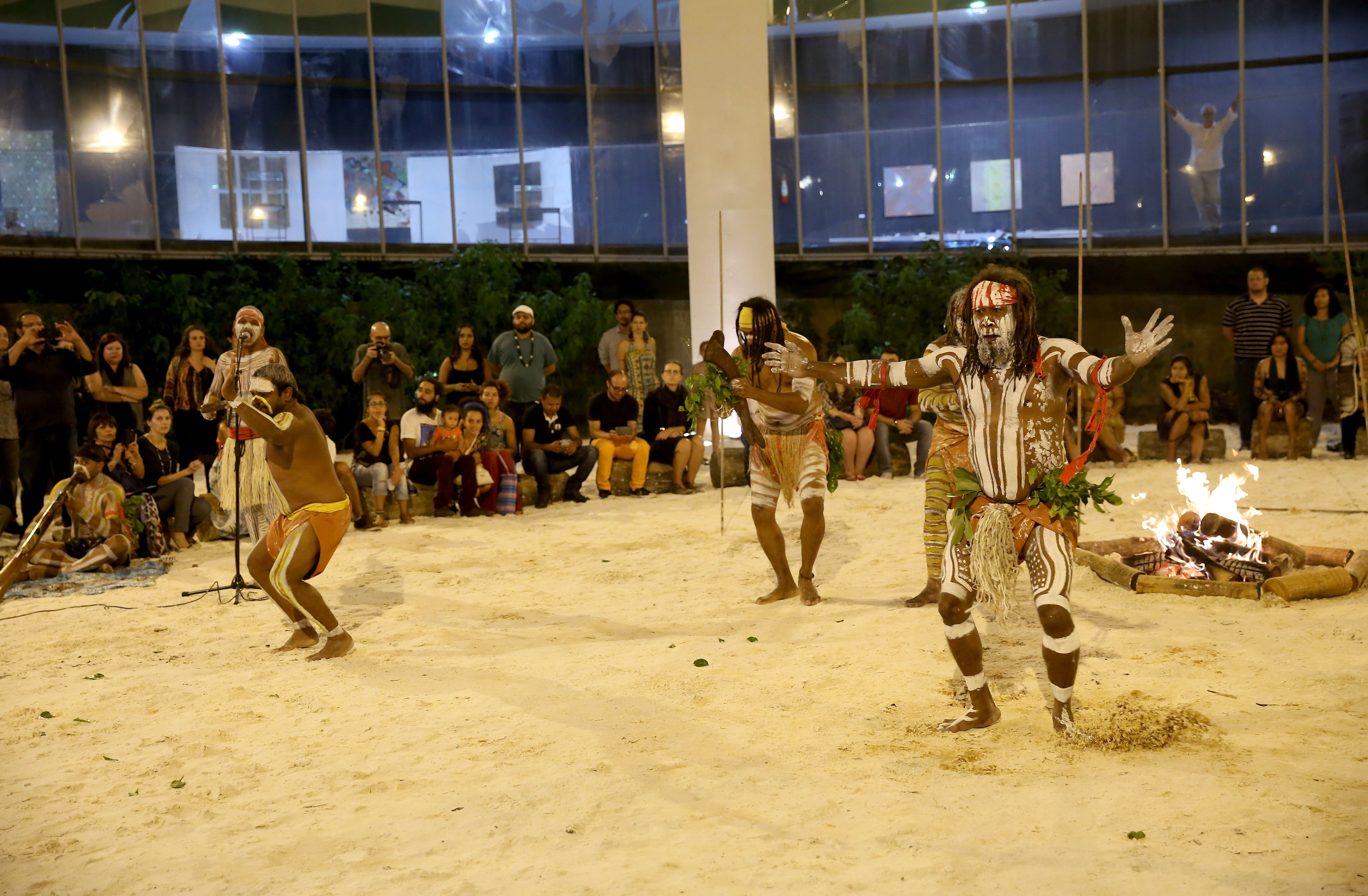
Descendance performing in 2016 during Indian Day celebrations in Brazil

Descendance (Descendance Aboriginal and Torres Strait Islander Dance Theatre), previously known as the Ngaru Dancers, is an Indigenous Australian dance company.

== History ==
Ngaru Dancers was formed in 1999 in Sydney by Sean Choolburra.

In 1998 Choolburra invited Aboriginal song woman Imelda Willis to take on cultural duties at the company, and world music producer Jose Calarco came on as director. Willis died only a year later.

They have performed and toured extensively both nationally and internationally, including to Russia, Serbia, Croatia, Hungary, the Middle East, Africa, Latvia, Lithuania, and Poland, where they have educated audiences about Aboriginal history. They have given performances for the Dalai Lama, Queen Elizabeth II, and stars such as Nicole Kidman. On 5 September 2004, the troupe represented Australia at the inaugural World Culture Open at the Lincoln Center for the Performing Arts in New York City, and on 9 September, performed at a memorial to the victims of 9/11 at Battery Park. Some members then went to Disneyland to give performances there, while the rest of the troupe flew to Korea to participate at WCO concerts there.

From 2001 until September 2004 and beyond, Descendance performed a show in Alice Springs every night of the week.

The troupe has also helped to promote Indigenous girls break into modelling in Australia.

== Recognition ==
Descendance won the Brolga Award for tourism in 2004 for their show in Alice Springs, and later that year won the World Dance and Peace Prize at UNESCO's inaugural World Culture Open in Seoul, Korea, in 2004. No government funding was provided for the event.

== People ==
As of 2026, Jose Calarco remains director of the company.

The following members performed in Seoul in 2004, under the direction of Calarco, who also produced the show:

- Nicki (Nicole) Willis (vocals; daughter of Imelda Willis)
- Ronnie Guivarra (vocals)
- Bennelong Carroll (didgeridoo)
- Arthur Turtle Tamwoy (dancer)
- George Dow (dancer)
- Les Daniel (dancer)
- Vivian Anderson (dancer)
