= Lucy Guerin =

Australian dancer and choreographer (born 1961)

Lucy Guerin AO
- Born: 1961 (age 64–65); Adelaide, Australia
- Known for: Dance and choreography
- Movement: Modern dance

Lucy Mary Guerin AO (born 1961) is an Australian dancer and choreographer. Her work is described as post-modern.

== Life and career ==
Lucy Guerin was born in Adelaide, Australia, and began her dance education at local dance schools. She graduated from Adelaide's Center for Performing Arts in 1982 and found employment in Sydney with Russell Dumas' Dance Exchange in 1983. In 1988 she took a position in Melbourne with Nanette Hassall's Dance Works company.

In 1989 Guerin relocated to New York City where she danced until 1996 with companies and choreographers including Tere O'Connor, Sara Rudner and Bebe Miller, and also began working as a choreographer. She presented Solemn Pink and Incarnadine (1996) at the Rencontres choreographiques internationales de Bagnolet in France, winning the Prix d'auteur. She toured Europe from 1997–98, and received a Bessie Award in 1996 for her Two Lies. In 1996 Guerin returned to Australia, and in 2002 she established the Australian dance company Lucy Guerin Inc. In New York her work has been presented at the Baryshnikov Arts Center.

== Honors and awards ==
- Prix d'auteur, 1996
- Bessie Award, 1996
- Green Room Awards
- Sidney Myer Performing Arts Award, 2000
- Helpmann Award for Best Dance Work, 2006

Guerin was made an Officer of the Order of Australia (AO) in the 2020 Australia Day Honours for "distinguished service to contemporary dance as a choreographer, and as a mentor and advocate for emerging artists and new works."

== Works ==
Selected works include:

- Sweet Dreams (1989)
- In Endless Description (1991) with Sarah Perron
- Ghost in Bloom (1994)
- Venus Bay (1996)
- Remote (1997)
- Robbery Waitress on Bail (1997)
- Heavy (1998)
- Zero (1999)
- Soft Centre (1999)
- The Ends of Things (2000)
- Living with Surfaces (2001)
- Melt (2002)
- Tell Me (2003) with Michael Lenz
- Tense Dave (2003) with Gideon Obarzanek and Michael Kantor
- Plasticine Park (2003) with Patricia Piccinini
- The Firebird 2003
- Baroque Masterworks for the Australian Opera (2004)
- Structure and Sadness (2006)
- Corridor (2008)
- Untrained (2009)
- Human Interest Story (2010)
- Conversation Piece (2012)
- Weather (2012)
- Microclimate (2015)
- Motion Picture (2015)
- The Dark Chorus (2016)
- Attractor (2017)
- Split (2017)
- Make Your Own World (2019)
- Metal (2020)
- Pendulum (2021) with Matthias Schack-Arnott (part of the 2021 RISING: festival in Melbourne)
- New Retro (2023)
- One Single Action: In An Ocean Of Everything (2024)(part of the 2024 RISING: festival in Melbourne)
