= Rafael Bonachela =

Spanish choreographer

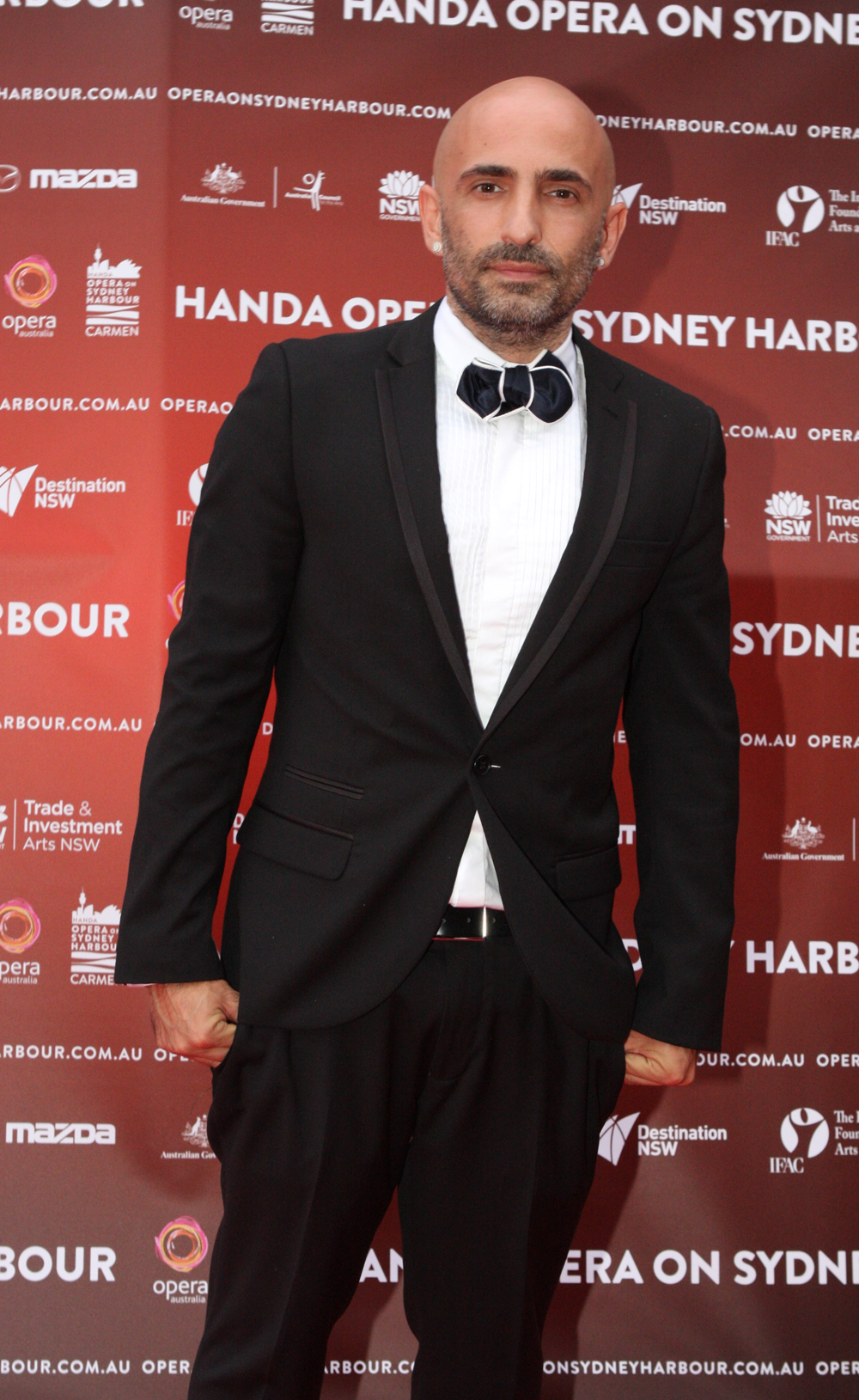
- Born: March 29, 1972 (age 54); La Garriga, Barcelona, Spain
- Website: www.sydneydancecompany.com

Rafael Bonachela is a Spanish-born, Australian choreographer notable for work across a range of art forms, including contemporary dance, art installations, pop concerts, musicals, film, commercials and fashion. He is recognised for his physical movement style of contemporary dance based on communicating emotions through the human form. Since 2009 he has been Artistic Director of the Sydney Dance Company in Walsh Bay, Sydney, New South Wales, Australia.

== Early years ==
Bonachela was born in La Garriga, a small town 45 km north of Barcelona in the Catalonia region of Spain, the eldest of four brothers. At the age of 15 he started dance training at Escola de Dansa Cadaqués Centre in Barcelona. At the age of seventeen he joined the Spanish troupe Lanònima Imperial where he performed and toured across Europe in productions of "Castor I Polux" and "Kairos". In 1990 he relocated to the United Kingdom to train at the London Studio Centre.

== Works ==
For the Sydney Dance Company, Bonachela has created multiple new works, including we unfold (2009), 6 Breaths (2010), Are We That We (2010), Irony Of Fate (2010), Soledad (2010), LANDforms (2011), The Land of Yes and the Land of No (2011–12), 2 One Another (2012), Project Rameau (2012), Project Rameau (joint with Richard Tognetti)(2012–13), 13 Rooms (2013), Emergence (2013), Les Illuminations (2013), 2 in D Minor (2014), Inside There Falls (Installation by Mira Calix)(2014), Interplay (2014), Louder Than Words (2014), Scattered Rhymes (2014), Frame of Mind (2015), CounterMove (2016), Lux Tenebris (2016), Nude Live (2017), Ocho (2017), Orb (2017), ab [intra] (2018) and Impermanence (2021).

== Collaborators ==
Bonachela has collaborated with many artists across his career at Rambert Dance Company, and as Artistic Director at Bonachela Dance Company and Sydney Dance Company. These include composers Ezio Bosso, Bryce Dessner, Nick Wales; artist Mira Calix, musicians Kylie Minogue, Tina Turner, Sarah Blasko, Katie Noonan; writer Samuel Webster; ensembles Australian String Quartet, Australian Chamber Orchestra; and designers Tony Assness, Benjamin Cisterne, David Fleischer; and venues such as the Art Gallery of NSW, Roslyn Packer Theatre, Sydney Opera House and Carriageworks.

== Reception ==
For his work Soledad, Bonachela won both the Premio Guglielmo Ebreo and the independent critic's prize at the Biennale Danza e Italia in Pesaro in 2006. He received the Australian Dance Award for choreography for 6 Breaths in 2011, and again for 2 One Another in 2013.

In 2012, Bonachela was named and one of the (sydney) magazine's Top 100 Most Influential People.

In February 2013, Rafael received the Officer's Cross of the Order of Civil Merit by His Majesty the King of Spain. In the same year, he was named the Dance Australia Critics Survey winner for 'Most Interesting Australian Artist'. He was also named winner of the dance category for The Monthly's 2013 Arts Awards.

Bonachela was nominated for the 2009, and 2014 Helpmann Award for Best Choreography in a Dance or Physical Theatre Production. He won it in 2015.
