= Sean Choolburra =

Aboriginal Australian comedian and dancer

- Born: 1968 or 1969 (age 56–57); Townsville, Queensland, Australia
- Occupations: Comedian, actor, dancer
- Years active: 1990s–present

Sean Choolburra (born 1968 or 1969) is an Aboriginal Australian comedian, dancer, actor, and didgeridoo player. He performed with the Bangarra Dance Theatre in the 1990s, and turned to comedy winning the New South Wales Raw Comedy final in 2002, becoming known as "the godfather of Aboriginal comedy". He also voices the character of Maynard in the children's TV series Bluey.

== Early life ==
Sean Choolburra was born in 1968 or 1969 in Townsville, Queensland, in a family of 12 (later quoted as 8). He is descended from the Kalkadoon and Gugu Yalanji peoples, and variously cited as also Girramay and Pitta Pitta, and/or Kandju and Bwgcolman peoples, from around Townsville and Palm Island. He recalls that growing up the family ate a lot of curries, often chicken or sea turtle, but also kangaroo, crayfish, dugong, and fish, always served with rice.

He studied dance at NAISDA in Sydney.

== Career ==
Choolburra founded the Ngaru Dancers, a dance troupe, in 1999, later renamed Descendance.

In 1994, Choolburra performed with Bangarra Dance Theatre in the 1994 productions NINNI and Ochres.

In 2002, he turned to comedy, winning the New South Wales Raw Comedy final in that year. He has performed in cities as well as remote and regional areas, and at festivals including the Dreaming Festival from 2005 to 2008, the Edinburgh Festival Fringe, the Scottish Storytelling Festival, and the Adelaide Fringe. He has hosted and performed in Deadly Funny in Adelaide, Melbourne, and Perth. He has also performed at schools.

His one-man show Oil of my Land, which he performed at the Sydney Opera House and Melbourne Comedy Festival, drew on his experiences growing up as an Aboriginal person.

On television, he has had his own show, and also performed on Express Yourself on NITV as well as Play School and Black Comedy on ABC Television.

In 2020, Choolburra appeared as an Aboriginal tracker in the feature film The Furnace.

During the COVID-19 pandemic (2021), Choolburra was selected to voice the character of Maynard on the TV hit children's show Bluey.

In 2022 he performed a successful run at the Edinburgh Fringe, and was interviewed on the BBC World Service Arts Hour.

In August 2023, Choolburra wrote and performed a poem for Poetry Month. In March 2024 he performed as part of the "Aboriginal Comedy Allstars" show at the Adelaide Fringe, hosted by Kevin Kropinyeri and joined by Elaine Crombie, Andy Saunders, Elaine Crombie, Janty Blair, and Jay Wymarra. The show being performed at the Laycock Street Community Theatre in Wyoming, New South Wales, in 2026.

In September 2024, he appeared on Adam Liaw's food show on SBS, The Cook Up with Adam Liaw.

He is scheduled to appear at Culture on Country at La Perouse Headland in Sydney on 26 January 2026 (Australia Day/Survival Day).

=== Influences and style ===
Choolburra has cited American comedian Eddie Murphy as a role model. Having trained in dance, he uses his body to comedic effect in his routines.

== Recognition ==
Choolburra is often referred to as the "grandfather" or "godfather" of Aboriginal comedy, and was described as "undisputed master of the move" in a 2017 article about Aboriginal comedy, and Aboriginal comedian Kevin Kropinyeri called him the "nice guy" of Australian comedy.

== Other activities ==
Choolburra has acted as ambassador for a variety of causes promoting health, education, and employment. He has also spoken about the high rate of incarceration of Aboriginal people as one of his concerns.

In 2022, he lent his voice to an animated video made by the Indigenous Program of Experience in Palliative Approach unit at Queensland University of Technology. The film uses humour "to help demystify and destigmatise palliative care and dying for Aboriginal and Torres Strait Islander peoples". Choolburra had only learnt about palliative care when his own mother became ill and died in 2020.
