= Kage Physical Theatre =

Kage Physical Theatre is an Australian physical theatre/contemporary dance company. It was established in 1997 by Kate Denborough and Gerard Van Dyck, graduates of the Victorian College of the Arts.

KAGE is a not-for-profit organisation which receives support from the public and private sectors. In 2001 Denborough and Van Dyck completed a three-month residency at the Australia Council Studio at the Cite Internationale des Arts in Paris.

== Festival performances and awards ==
They have performed at a number of festivals including the Next Wave Festival, Melbourne: performing Contamination in (1998) and No (Under)Standing Anytime in 2000; and at the 2000 Asia Pacific Next Wave Festival in Japan performing This Side Up and the 2008 ASSITEJ Adelaide 16th World Congress and Performing Arts Festival for Young People performing Headlock.

Nowhere Man developed for Kage earned Denborough the Australian Dance Award for outstanding achievement in independent dance.

Headlock (2006) won five Green Room Awards and the Australian Dance Award for best male performer for Byron Perry.

KAGE was Company in Residence at Arts Centre Melbourne in 2009, and in 2010 KAGE became a resident company at the Abbotsford Convent.

KAGE and Alzheimer's Australia Vic were awarded recognition for Good Partnering Practice in the 2011 Arts & Health Foundation Award category at the 2011 ABAF Awards for their partnership developed during the creation of Sundowner.

== Works ==
- Kage (1997)
- Contamination (1998)
- Asphyxiate (1998)
- No (Under)Standing Anytime (2000) (funded through Australia Council Emerging Choreographers Initiative and the Australian Choreographic Centre)
- This Side Up (2000) commissioned by Chunky Move
- 2 Without Spine (2000), choreographed: Lucy Guerin with assistance from the Australia Council
- The Collapsible Man (2001)
- Misfit (2001)
- Birthday (2002), directed by John Bolton
- Underground (2002)
- Nowhere Man (2003)
- The day the world turned upside down (2004)
- Headlock (2006)
- Ink (2006)
- Appetite (2008)
- Pink Lines (2008)
- Look Right Through Me (2011)
- Sundowner (2011)
- Flesh and Bone (2013)
- Forklift (2014)
- Team of Life (2014)
- Picnic (2015)
- Out of Earshot (2017)
