= Harry Haythorne =

Australian ballet dancer

Henry Neville Haythorne MBE (7 October 1926 – 24 November 2014) was an Australian dancer, ballet master, artistic director, and teacher who performed in vaudeville, musicals, and ballet companies in the United Kingdom, continental Europe, and Australia. He was assistant artistic director of the Scottish Ballet (1969–1974) and artistic director of the Queensland Ballet (1975–1978) and the Royal New Zealand Ballet (1981–1992).

== Early years ==
Haythorne was born in Adelaide, South Australia, the child of an English father and an Australian mother of Irish descent. Both his parents, who had met at a local dance hall, loved ballroom dancing, but they were barred from many venues in Adelaide because they dared to introduce what Haythorne jokingly referred to in an interview as "filthy foreign dances" such as the foxtrot and the quickstep. His father had brought these dance styles with him when he migrated from England to Australia. They were unknown at the time in Adelaide.

Haythorne began his dance training with Jean Bedford, who taught "operatic dancing," and shortly afterward enrolled in tap dancing classes with Herbert Noye. His initial ambitions were to go into vaudeville. Even with the visits of the Ballets Russes companies to Australia in the 1930s, which was an exciting time for him, he still did not have ambitions to take up ballet seriously.

When Haythorne was fourteen, he began his professional performing career with Harold Raymond's Varieties, a vaudeville troupe established initially as a concert party to entertain troops as World War II began. With Harold Raymond, he took part in comedy sketches, played his piano accordion, sang songs, and danced. His star act, which would feature again much later in his life, was his tap dancing routine on roller skates.

During the last months of World War II, Haythorne joined the Royal Australian Air Force and remained in the defence forces for two years. After being discharged, he resumed his dancing career. In the late 1940s, he took ballet classes from the Adelaide teacher Joanna Priest and performed in her South Australian Ballet. However, it was seeing performances by Ballet Rambert during its Australasian tour (1947–1949) that inspired him to change direction and look to ballet as a career.

== Theatrical career ==
Haythorne left Australia in 1949, bound for the United Kingdom. In London he took ballet classes with Anna Northcote and Stanislas Idzikowski before auditioning successfully for the Metropolitan Ballet and later joining Mona Inglesby's International Ballet. But his career in England and continental Europe proved to be an eclectic one, not limited to the world of ballet. He worked on the Max Bygraves Show, danced on early British television shows, performed in musicals, including Cole Porter's Can Can, and toured to South Africa with a production of The Pajama Game. In an interview in 2000, Haythorne listed the three greatest influences on his career in England and Europe as Léonide Massine, for whom he acted as personal assistant and ballet master for Massine's company, Les Ballets Européens; Walter Gore, for whom he was ballet master of London Ballet; and Peter Darrell, who hired him as manager of Western Theatre Ballet and then as assistant artistic director of the Scottish Ballet in Glasgow.

Always an Australian at heart, Haythorne began to miss his homeland and made various moves to return. He eventually went back, and, in 1975, took up the position of artistic director of the Queensland Ballet. With that company, he mounted works by a number of Australian choreographers, including Graeme Murphy, Garth Welch, Don Asker, Rex Reid, Leslie White, and Ray Cook, and he introduced the ballets of choreographers he had worked with in the United Kingdom, including Walter Gore, Jack Carter, and Peter Darrell. He also engaged the Danish dancer and teacher Hans Brenaa to stage La Sylphide and other works of August Bournonville. Despite these accomplishments in only three years on the job, Haythorne's directorship was a short one, as his contract was terminated in 1978. He was unhappy at the way this was done and thereafter always maintained that no rational explanation was ever given.

After leaving the Queensland Ballet, Haythorne was founding coordinator of a tertiary dance course at Kelvin Grove College of Advanced Education (now Queensland University of Technology). He remained in this role for another three years, but, after deciding that he wanted to direct a company rather than head a dance school, he accepted the position of artistic director of the Royal New Zealand Ballet in 1981. His directorship of this company was a fruitful one, lasting more than a decade, until 1992. He regarded it as the happiest time of his life. During his tenure, the company staged works by major international artists. Haythorne oversaw the company's thirtieth anniversary in 1983; staged his own full-length Swan Lake; and toured the company in China, the United States, and Europe as well as in Australia. For the company's sixtieth anniversary in 2013, encapsulating his attitude to his appointment in 1981, and also his approach to directorship in general, he wrote: "I knew I had to learn much more about New Zealand and its history, familiarise myself not only with its dance world but also with its literature, music, and visual arts, while still keeping a finger on the international pulse."

During his time in New Zealand, Haythorne worked closely with the New Zealand School of Dance and its teachers. He attended school auditions and became a member of the board of directors. He believed that the strength of any company was a school that would train dancers who were familiar with company style and repertoire and who had gained experience by having small parts in its productions while still students.

In the 1993 New Zealand New Year Honours, Haythorne was appointed a Member of the Order of the British Empire, for services to ballet.

== Later years ==
On his return to Australia from New Zealand in 1993, Haythorne was always in demand. He taught dance history at the Victorian College of the Arts, in Southbank, and repertoire at the National Theatre Ballet School, in Melbourne, and was frequently invited to teach and stage ballets for schools around Australia. He returned to the stage himself on several occasions with productions by the Australian Ballet, taking cameo roles in Stanton Welch's Cinderella (1997), Graeme Murphy's Swan Lake (2002) and Nutcracker: The Story of Clara (1992, revived 2003), Ronald Hynd's Merry Widow (1975, later revived), and the joint Australian Ballet–Sydney Dance Company production of Murphy's Tivoli (2001). He is especially remembered for his role in Tivoli, in which he was cast as an old vaudeville trouper. At the age of seventy-five, Haythorne reprised his tap dancing–roller skating–skipping routine from the 1940s. For his performances in this role he received the 2001 Australian Dance Award for Outstanding Performance by a Male Dancer.

== Publications ==
In 1970, Haythorne published How to Be a Ballet Dancer, with illustrations by Peter Cazalet (England: Wolfe Publishing for the Dairy Industry). He was the author of articles published in Dance Australia, in Brolga: An Australian Journal about Dance, and in Choreography and Dance: An International Journal, and he was a contributor to the Royal New Zealand Ballet's sixtieth birthday publication, The Royal New Zealand Ballet at Sixty. He was also a frequent writer of letters to the editor of various dance magazines.

== Celebration ==
Haythorne died in a Melbourne hospice in November 2014 at the age of eighty-eight. A small, private funeral was held for his close friends. When his will was read, it was learned that he had requested a party celebrating his life rather than a somber memorial service with a eulogy. Accordingly, on 31 January 2015, simultaneous celebrations, linked by video, were held in the studios of the Australian Ballet in Melbourne and the Royal New Zealand Ballet in Wellington, Many members of the dance and theatre communities in both countries attended and shared affectionate anecdotes and stories.
