= Anything Is Valid Dance Theatre =

Anything Is Valid Dance Theatre is a contemporary dance company based in Perth. The company was founded in 2008 by Serena Chalker and Quindell Orton, graduates of the Western Australian Academy of Performing Arts and is a company that works in site-specific and immersive performance.

Anything is Valid Dance Theatre has premiered in Europe at Springhouse 2014 in Dresden (DE), where they performed The Dual Existence of Time, and in 2015 AIVDT premiered their one-on-one immersive mobile performance When We First Met at the 24th Process – Space Art Festival (BG). This work has since been re-mounted at Water Tower Art Fest (BG), Noted Festival (AU), YouAreHere Festival (AU), and Festival of Alternative Theatrical Expression (HR). Also in 2015, Amongst the Many premiered at In Short In-Situ, an interactive work guiding 20 audience members through via headsets at Fremantle Arts Centre. In 2012 AIVDT created in Life in Miniature, winner of Best Dance at the Adelaide Fringe, and nominated for numerous awards including a WA Dance Award for Outstanding Achievement in Choreography. The work is a critically acclaimed performance inside a caravan for an intimate audience, premiering at the 2012 Perth Fringe Festival, with sell-out seasons at the MoveMe Festival and 2013 Adelaide Fringe. In 2010 AIVDT premiered UNEXPECTED-microclimates, a promenade performance in the Perth laneways, which also debuted to a sell-out crowd. AIVDT are currently developing Dust on the Shortbread, created on renowned Australian senior performers Dr Elizabeth Cameron Dalman OAM (founder of Australian Dance Theatre) and George Shevtsov. Created in a suburban house, this work explores the lives of an older couple; the tension between maintaining independence and vitality and the effects of dementia on intimate relationships.

== Sources ==
- http://www.perthdance.com/articles.php?id=9
- http://www.aivdt.com
- https://web.archive.org/web/20090614002716/http://www.childrenandyouth.wa.gov.au/u35/search.asp
- http://www.streeteditors.com/archives/5069%5B‍%5D
- http://www.musicloversgroup.com/empire-of-the-sun-standing-on-the-shore-video-and-lyrics/
