= Nanette Hassall =

Australian dancer, choreographer and dance teacher

- Born: 1947 (age 78–79); Sydney, Australia
- Known for: Dance and choreography
- Movement: Modern dance

Nanette Hassall AM (born 1947) is an Australian dancer, choreographer and dance teacher.

== Life and career ==
Nanette Hassall was born in Sydney, Australia, and studied dance at venues including Australian schools. She taught physical education at a girls' high school while pursuing her love of dance. In 1969, she won the Ballet Australia Choreographic Competition, using her prize money to help her continue her studies in the United States. There, she attended the Juilliard School, New York, on scholarship, with teachers including José Limón and Antony Tudor. She danced with companies including the Merce Cunningham Dance Company, Ballet Rambert, the Strider Dance Company (Richard Alston) and Dance Company NSW (Jaap Flier). Hassall taught at schools and colleges including Dartington College of Arts, Opleiding Moderne Dans School in Amsterdam, Deakin University, Rusden State College, the Victorian College of the Arts, and Western Australian Academy of Performing Arts (department head, 1995).

While working at the Dartingon College of the Arts, she met American composer Bill Fontana, marrying him in London in 1975. Fontana joined her in working at Dance Company NSW.

By 1983, The Age was describing Hassall as "a leading figure in Australian post-modern dance." She co-founded Dance Exchange with Russell Dumas, and founded Dance Works in Melbourne (director, 1983–89). She left Dance Works in 1989 to ensure that the company continued to nurture developing choreographers rather than focusing too extensively on her own work. Hassall choreographed prolifically for Dance Exchange. She regularly commissions works from Australian composers for her choreography. Hassall is active on boards and panels as an advocate for dance and dance education, and is the author of papers and articles including: "Phillip Adams" (2004).

== Honors and awards ==
- Ballet Australia Award (1969) for Solus (music by Peter Sculthorpe)
- "Outstanding Achievement in Dance Education", Australian Dance Awards (2002)
- Member of the Order of Australia (AM) "for significant service to the performing arts, particularly through dance education"

== Works ==
Selected works (in alphabetical order) include:

- As the Crow Flies
- Faster Than Photos
- Forcefield
- Or Is It?
- Pyralis
- Rainbow Bandit
- Silken Tent
- Trespassing on Borrowed Time
