= World Culture Open =

World Culture Open (WCO)
- Founded: 2003
- Type: Non-profit Organization
- Purpose: cultural diversity, creative economy
- Location: New York, Seoul, Beijing
- Origins: Washington, D.C.
- Region served: United States, South Korea, China, Africa, Japan
- Website: www.worldcultureopen.org

World Culture Open (WCO) is a non-profit organization that promotes cultural diversity and unprejudiced cultural exchange around the globe. WCO has its regional offices in New York City, Seoul, and Beijing.

== Mission ==
World Culture Open believes in using culture to promote peace, because "countries and cultures often divided by politics can easily and frequently unite over the arts, humanitarianism and health." Based on this belief, WCO works to promote cultural diversity around the world and create an open platform for intercultural exchange and collaboration. WCO "…dreams of a global community where cultural diversity is truly fostered and appreciated by all everywhere."

== History ==
In early 2000, few like-minded people conceived a notion of having a "cultural olympic." They thought of using cultural competition as a way to bring different people-groups together to promote peace, just like how the original Olympic games use sport competition to promote peace. On 2003, professionals and leaders of various fields from 40 different countries around the world gathered in Washington D.C. for an international convention. Participants of the convention agreed on the necessity of an organization that can lead the concerted efforts for transcending borders and people-groups by using culture. This led to the launch of World Culture Open.

=== Timeline ===
- First WCO Award awarded to Dr.José Antonio Abreu of El Sistema, 2004
- WCO Global Festival, New York City & Seoul, 2004
- WCO International Choral Festival in support of the United Nations Food and Agriculture Organization (UNFAO)’s Telefood Campaign, New York, 2005
- Pan-African Dance Festival, in partnership with the Ministry of Sports and Culture, Kigali, Rwanda, 2006
- WCO International Conference on Creative Economy for Development, co-organized with the UNDP/South-South Cooperation, Kigali, Rwanda, 2006
- UN Global Youth Leadership Summit, in partnership with the United Nations Office on Sport for Development and Peace (UNOSDP), United Nations, New York City, 2006
- Youth United Against Malaria Concert, United Nations, New York City, 2006
- Cultural Exchange Concert Series Beijing, China; Mongolia; Korea; and Tokyo, Japan; 2009-2010
- Japan Earthquake Relief Charity Concert, Iwate, Japan, 2011
- C!TALK Beijing, China 2012–present

== WCO’s work ==
WCO's activities are primarily focused around the following three areas.

=== Creative sharing ===
- C!HERE Movement: C!HERE Movement transforms empty spaces in the city into cultural activation open to the public. These spaces can be of any shape and sizes, including storefronts, office meeting rooms, theater stages, a few tables at a café, or even private backyards. Space owners wishing to create good will for the public and contribute to the cultural vitality of the community may give their space for a certain time period, for certain time slots on a regular basis, or they may also donate the space to be used as a dedicated C!HERE space. The spaces will then be transformed into new cultural spaces, offering many artists and cultural practitioners the opportunity to showcase and share their work and letting the public have a greater exposure to a wide spectrum of artistic and cultural experiences. Since the launch of the C!HERE movement in 2001, more than 60,000 people have participated.
- WCO Creative Sharing Campaign (C!TALK): In 2012, WCO's regional office in Beijing began holding bimonthly cultural events and programs like concerts, lectures, and exhibitions for the public. The project brings together the showcase of various cultural artists and organizations at free of charge. The purpose of the event is to support the activities of artists under difficult situations.

=== Cultural exchange ===
- WCO Global Festivals: The WCO Global Festival is a global celebration of cultural diversity that brings together audiences, artists and cultural practitioners from all over the world. The festival has various programs including international conferences, performance and exhibition series, opening and closing ceremonies, and special concerts and projects. The WCO Games and the WCO Awards Ceremony also take place during the festival. The festival lasts for about two weeks in the host city. The first WCO Global Festival took place in 2004 in multiple locations: New York City, United States; Seoul, South Korea; and the Headquarters of the United Nations. Many organizations from over 50 countries and a number of international organizations including UNESCO and UNDP participated in the event. During the Awards Ceremony, renowned artists like Youssou N'Dour from Senegal, Yair Dalal from Israel, Misia from Portugal, and Wyclef Jean from Haiti/US were featured.
- Pan-African Dance Festival (FESPAD): FESPAD is a festival that has been taking place biennially since 1998. The festival draws in a wide circle of international artists and humanitarian workers to celebrate and communicate African culture through traditional dances. On FESPAD 2006 in Rwanda, FESPAD partnered with WCO to organize the festival.
- WCO International Conference on Creative Economy for Development: During FESPAD 2006, UNDP's special unit for the South to South Cooperation and WCO organized the International Conference on Creative Economy for Development in Kigali, Rwanda. Many cultural leaders, including ministers of culture from 20 different African countries, gathered to discuss ways of using culture for economic development in Africa, and find ways to capitalize the rich of culture of Africa.
- UN Global Youth Leadership Summit: United Nations Office on Sport for Development and Peace (UNOSDP) and WCO partnered to provide cultural events during the United Nations Global Youth Leadership Summit (UNGYLS) held from October 29–31, 2006 at the UN Headquarters. For the summit, young leaders around the world gathered to discuss ways they can help to achieve the Millennium Development Goals (MDGs). For the summit, WCO organized the Youth United Against Malaria Gala Concert, The International Bell Parade, land a workshop entitled Advancing the MDGs Through Cultural Exchange.

=== Cultural support ===
- WCO Awards: The WCO Awards are cultural awards that recognize and honor individuals and organizations that have benefited the humanity through dedicated efforts rooted in profound cultural understanding. The WCO Awards give consideration to the following cultural fields at large: the Creative Arts field for artistic, cultural and creative contributions to humanity; the Holistic Wellbeing field for invention, discovery or practice that has profoundly improved the wellbeing of humanity; and the Humanitarian Service field for dedicated efforts to promote community spirit and practice humanitarian services. The first WCO Award was awarded to Dr.José Antonio Abreu of El Sistema.
- Youth United Against Malaria Gala Concert: (UNOSDP), Roll Back Malaria Partnership, and WCO partnered to produce the Youth United Against Malaria Concert on October 29, 2006. Hundreds of youth delegates from 192 countries and more than 1000 guests were entertained by a team of world-renowned singers from across the globe. Performers included UNICEF Goodwill Ambassador Angélique Kidjo, singer/songwriter Gordon Chambers and UNICEF regional spokesperson for malaria Yvonne Chaka Chaka.
