= Kate Denborough =

Australian dancer and choreographer

Kate Denborough is a choreographer, artistic director, CEO and co-founder of Kage Physical Theatre. She has directed, devised and/or performed in most of KAGE's works as well as working with other companies such as Chunky Move, Australian Dance Theatre and Tasdance, through which she has been nominated for and won various awards such as Canberra Critics Circle Award for Dance. She is also a member of the Malthouse Artistic Counsel.

== Personal life ==
Denborough was born in 1974 and received schooling at the Victorian College of the Arts in Melbourne in 1994 with a Bachelor of Dance. While at university in 1992 she met Gerard Van Dyck.

== KAGE ==
In 1996, Kate and Gerard Van Dyck co-founded KAGE, naming it after her and Gerard (Kate, Gerard). To date, KAGE has created 20 works. As of its 17th, Denborough had taken part in all of them through devising, directing and/or performing. Today she is the CEO and artistic director of KAGE.

== Awards ==
Denborough's awards and nominations include:

- Canberra Critics Circle Award for Dance
- Green Room Award for Female Emerging Artist in Dance
- Joint winner of the Eva Czajor memorial Award, an award for female directors
- The Paris residency at the Cite Internationale des Arts in 2001
- Listed in the 2013 Westpac Group 100 Women of Influence Awards
- Nomination for Australian Dance Award for Outstanding Performance by a Female Dancer

== Shows ==
- Kage (1997), shown at now-defunct Budinski's Theatre, Melbourne
- Contamination (1998), shown at the Next Wave Festival
- Asphyxiate (1998)
- No (Under)Standing Anytime (2000), shown at the Next Wave Festival
- This Side Up (2000)
- 2 Without Spine (2000)
- Collapsible Man (2001)
- Misfit (2001)
- Birthday (2002)
- Underground (2002)
- Nowhere Man (2003), shown at Melbourne International Arts Festival
- The day the world turned upside down (2004)
- Al Fresco (2006) shown at Melbourne Cultural Festival for the Commonwealth Games
- Headlock (2006), shown at the Malthouse
- Ink (2006)
- Possessed (2007), Denborough directed
- Appetite (2008), shown at the 2008 Melbourne International Festival of the Arts
- Pink Lines (2008), Denborough choreographed for Tasdance
- Look Right Through Me (2011)
- Sundowner (2011), Denborough directed in partnership with Alzheimer's Australia Vic,
- Wildlife (2013)
- Flesh & Bone (2013)
- Team of Life (2014)
- Forklift (2014)

Denborough has worked collaboratively outside of KAGE with Australian Dance Theatre, Tasdance, Weave, compaignie par.b.leax (Montreal), and Victorian College of the Arts.
