= Tracks Inc =

Tracks is a dance theatre company based in Darwin, Northern Territory.

== History ==
Tracks dance company was founded in 1994, although its beginnings lie in a community dance program in 1988. It has completed residencies in Lajamanu (1989 and 1990) and continues to work with that community.

== Description ==
The company is located at Harbour View Plaza in Darwin. It seeks to engage community members in its productions, applying community cultural development practice in their work over many years. It focuses on engaging with Indigenous Australians and their communities.

A seniors dance group, the "Grey Panthers", has also been formed.

== Awards ==
- Nominated, 2000 Northern Territory Human Rights Awards for work with refugees and migrants, Sticks ‘n’ Stones project.
- The Sidney Myer Performing Arts Awards 2004 Group Award was awarded to Tracks Dance Theatre and Melbourne Workers Theatre.
- Shortlisted 2007 Australian Dance Awards Services to Dance
- Winner Australian Dance Award for Outstanding Achievement in Youth or Community dance - 2008 for Struck
- Winner 2009 Australian Business Arts Foundation Giving Award: SA and NT Australian business and the arts Giving Award for Milpirri 2008 with the Milpirri Management Committee and Rio Tinto Aboriginal Fund
- Shortlisted 2010 Australian Dance Award Outstanding Achievement in Youth or Community Dance. The Cook, The Queen and the Kelly
- Winner 2013 Australian Dance Award for Outstanding Achievement in Youth or Community Dance. Eight to Eighty - the Architecture of Age
- 2014 David McMicken and Tim Newth made Members (AM) in the general division of the Order of Australia
- Shortlisted 2014 Australian Dance Award Outstanding Achievement in Youth or Community Dance. Zombies in the Banyan Tree
- Winner 2015 Australian Dance Award Outstanding Achievement in Community Dance. Milpirri (jarda-warnpa)
- Shortlisted 2017 Australian Dance Award Outstanding Achievement in Community Dance. Landed
- Shortlisted 2017 Australian Dance Award Outstanding Achievement in Youth Dance. Milpirri - Kirdiji
- Finalist, 2017 Australian of the Year - Northern Territory. David McMicken and Tim Newth
- Winner 2018 Australian Dance Award, Outstanding Achievement in Community Dance. Man Made

== Works and performances ==
Tracks has toured interstate and regularly performs throughout the Northern Territory.

- Flying off the Edge (1992)
- Tracks and Clusters (1992)
- Lajamanu Kurra Karna Yani (1992)
- From Little Things Big Things Grow (1992)
- Old Spice Club Cabaret (1992)
- Land (1993)
- Silent Thought (1993)
- Sacred Space (1994)
- My House (1994)
- Sacred Space (1994)
- Yawalyu, Lajamanu Ceremonial Dances
- Open House 2 (1994)
- Healthy Wealthy and Wise (1995)
- Yipirinya - After the Rain (1995)
- Boundaries and Beyond (1995)
- Ngapa - Two Cultures One Country (1996)
- The Opportunity of Distance – Tour (1996)
- Six Feet Over or Under (1996)
- Angurugu Residency - Wild Things (1997)
- Bodies of Light (1997)
- 4WD Sweat Dust and Romance (1997)
- The Land the Cross and the Lotus (1998)
- Kukanarri Show – Tiwi Islands (1998)
- Walking on Water (1999)
- Reluctant Retirees (1999)
- Shades of Pink (1999)
- Top of the Tower (1999)
- Recollections (1999)
- Emergence (1999)
- Love vs Gravity (2000)
- Outside the Camp (2000)
- Sticks n Stones (2000)
- Two Fold Journey (2000)
- Dear Auntie (2001)
- Mother Daughter (2001)
- Fierce - The Story of Olive Pink (2001)
- Rivers of the Underground (2001)
- Fierce - The Meeting of Olive Pink (2002)
- Rivers of the Underground (return season) (2002)
- Ignite (2002)
- Local (2003)
- Janganpa (2003)
- A Bowls Club Wedding (2003)
- Rust (2004)
- Fast (2004)
- Snakes Gods and Deities (2004)
- Milpirri - Jarda-Warnpa (2005)
- Angels of Gravity (2005)
- Arafura Games 05 (Opening Ceremony) (2005)
- A Bowls Club Wedding (return season) (2006)
- Mr BIG (2006)
- Without Sea (2006)
- You Dance funny (2007)
- Arafura Game - Opening Ceremony (2007)
- Lipstick and Ochre (2008)
- Struck (2008)
- Milpirri – Jurntu (2009)
- Endurance (2009)
- Allure of Paradise (2010)
- The Cook the Queen and the Kelly (2010)
- Milpirri Showing – Yinapaka (2011)
- Crocodile Man Pineapple Woman (2011)
- Milpirri – Pulyaranyi (2012)
- Eight to Eighty - The Architecture of Age (2012)
- Zombies in the Banyan Tree (2013)
- Future Age (2013)
- Milpirri - Jarda-Warnpa (2014)
- You Dance Funny - The Sequalé (2014)
- Last Light (2015)
- Hidden Meaning (2015)
- Milpirri – Kurdiji (2016)
- Landed (2016)
- Caravan (2017)
- Man Made (2017)
- Tracktivation (2018)
- In Your Blood (2018)
- Milpirri – Jurntu (2018)
- En Masse (2019)
- Global Positioning (2019)
