= Russell Dumas (choreographer) =

Australian dancer, choreographer and writer

- Born: October 17, 1946 (age 80); Brisbane, Australia
- Known for: Dance and choreography
- Movement: Modern Dance, Postmodern Dance and ballet

Russell Dumas (born 17 October 1946) is an Australian dancer, choreographer and writer.

== Life and career ==
Russell Dumas was born in Brisbane, and studied both classical and modern dance. He first began stage performance with J.C. Williamson and later danced internationally with the London Festival Ballet, Ballet Rambert, Nederlands Dans Theater, the Royal Ballet, Culberg Ballet, Strider Dance Company, Trisha Brown and Twyla Tharp.

In 1976 Dumas founded the Dance Exchange in Sydney with Nanette Hassall, Eva Karczag and David Hinkfuss. He continues to serve as artistic director. His choreography is often performed without lighting, costumes or music and is described as postmodern. In 1985 he founded the Dancelink program to give Australian artists access to seminal dance practices from the US, Asia and Europe. Dumas is also known for critical analysis and writing.

Brisbane-born Russell Dumas trained in a number of dance styles in Australia and overseas including classical ballet, and the Graham and Cunningham techniques. He began his performing career in musical comedy with the J.C Williamson organisation and later danced with a wide variety of English and European companies including the London Festival Ballet, Ballet Rambert, Nederlands Dans Theater, the Royal Ballet, Culberg Ballet, Strider and in the US with Trisha Brown and Twyla Tharp.

In 1976 Dumas founded the Sydney-based company Dance Exchange with Nanette Hassall, which he continues to direct. In 1985 he established the Dancelink program, bringing many dance teachers and artists to Australia. His interests have encompassed not only choreography, performance and film but critical analysis and writing as well. [Text from Australian National Library.]

Russell Dumas, one of Australia's most respected and influential choreographers

Russell Dumas founded Dance Exchange in 1976. His choreography, presented under the company‟s name ever since, constitutes one of the most distinctive and original bodies of Australian dance work. Dance Exchange represents, uniquely, the legacy of American modern and post-modern (as opposed to European contemporary) dance in Australia. Dumas's dance style has been described a "sensuous, non-decorative, pedestrian classicism‟ (Larousse Dictionnaire de la Danse 1999). With its deceptive simplicity, this aesthetic, present in all Dumas's choreographies, requires a prolonged and rigorous work with dancers. Each dance and each performance grows out of this work. The dancing, free of narrative, psychological or other theatrical overtones is a testament to kinaesthetic intelligence and an ode to the simple, always surprising, sometimes humorous beauty of human bodies-in-action. Awards include the Jury Prize for International Video Dance Festival, Sete, 1990 for Approaching Sleipner Junction.

== Works ==
Selected works include:

- Surround (1993)
- ...and yet (1995)
- The Oaks Café (1997–2000)

"touch and go", The Performance Space, Sydney (2001) "in the room" (2003–2009)

- huit à huit (2009)

history of works : DANCE FOR THE TIME BEING – SOUTHERN EXPOSURE" (2013) Dance for the time being" (2010 -2012) In The Room 2004–2005, Cultural Residues 2003, In Available Light 2003, Touch and Go 2002, The Oaks Café/Cuckoo 2000, Cassandra's Dance 1999, Cargo Cult/Accumulation 1998, Cargo Cult 1997, Through Frames 1996...And Yet 1995, Envelope 1995, One Leg From Certain Angles 1994, A Tree From Any Direction 1994, Surround 1993, Duets Project 1993, Eurotrash 1992, Trailer 1991, Rescued Estates 1991, Approaching Sleipner Junction 1990, Local Motion – Program 2 1990, Blue Palm/White Lies 1989, Occasional Dances 1989, Incidental Light 1989, Between Movement and Light 1989, Foreign Bodies/Local Solos 1988, Postmodern Cabaret 1987, Dancing Sara's Phrases 1987, Small Appropriations 1986, Double Exposure 1985, Local Motion 1985, Circular Quay......... 1984–85, Distinguishing Feature 1983, 8 – 9 1982, Project 1982, One for Nothing 1982, Mulambin Beach 1981–1983, Interludes 1981, Circles 1981, 4,3,2,1- 1981, Rough Cuts 1981, Grid 1980, Beach I, II and III 1979, Blinky Bill 1979, Fractions and Fractions T.V. Event 1979, With a Feather Finish 1979, X 1978, Shift Work / Kelvin Grove Event 1978, Group Activities 1978, Counterbalance II 1978 – 1979, Reciprocal Solos, 1977, Ten Cents a Dance 1977, Three Duets 1977, Sculptural Music No. 1 in Mused II 1977, Red Paper Piece 1977, Phrases for the Chinese 1976, Little Duet 1976, Cram 1976, Wriggles Incorporated 1976, Mozart Duet 1976, No Standing, Only Dancing 1976, Standing, Walking, Running Dance 1976, TV Light (TV Channel 1) 1975, Work in Progress 1974, Gallery Event 1974, Saturday Sequence 1974, Trio 1972, Solo for Charlie 1972, Solo with Pendulums 1972,

== Awards ==
- 1968 Australian Overseas Fellowship – Royal Academy of Dancing (London)
- 1975 Travel Grant from the Australia Council 1976, 77, 78, 79, 81, 82, 83 Individual Choreographic Awards from the
- Australia Council 1988 Creative Development Fellowship from the Australia Council
- 1990 Prix Spécial du Jury – International Video Dance – Sète, France
- 1996–1999 Received Fellowship from the Australia Council

Dancers that have danced with Dance Exchange

Jonathan Sinatra Stuart Shugg Linda Sastradipradja Lucy Guerin Rebecca Hilton David Huggins Molly McMenamin Eric Fon Nicole Jenvey Beth Lane
