= Australian Dance Council =

The Australian Dance Council, known as Ausdance or Ausdance National and formerly the Australian Association for Dance Education (AADE), is or was the national dance advocacy organisation in Australia, representing the dance profession and coordinating a network of state organisations, including Ausdance ACT, Ausdance Qld, Ausdance SA, Ausdance Victoria and Ausdance WA.

As of 2021 its situation is uncertain after being deprived of its main funding by the Australia Council in 2016, and it announced its disbanding in 2019; however, it has continued to host the Australian Dance Awards until 2020.

== History ==
The Australian Dance Council was founded in Melbourne in 1977 as the Australian Association for Dance Education (AADE) by a group including Peggy van Praagh, Peter Brinson, Shirley McKechnie, Warren Lett, Keith Bain OAM, Johanna Exiner and Donna Greaves. It then created the first Ausdance National Committee (later the National Council) in New South Wales, which later moved to Canberra, ACT, and established Ausdance organisations in each state and territory. In 1985 it was awarded annual funding by the federal government's arts funding body, the Australia Council.

Ausdance National co-founded the National Advocates for Arts Education (NAAE) in 1989.

In 2019 it became a casualty of the huge cuts in funding made by Arts Minister George Brandis in 2016, finally unable to sustain enough funding to continue to operate, despite restructuring. Brandis had cut A$104.8 million of general funding from the Australia Council, representing a quarter of available funding.

Members of the dance community hoped for its reconstitution, but as of November 2021, the last annual report on its website is for 2018.

== Mission and functions ==
Ausdance's stated mission was to "advocate for dance and the diversity of dance in Australia", aiming to:

- Lead and shape dance policy development and debate
- Provide a national voice for dance and dance education
- Identify and promote diverse forms of dance and dance practice
- Encourage access to and understanding of dance
- Foster national and international links with dance and dance-related organisations

Over the years it created or hosted a number of forums, conferences, festivals and publications, developed guidelines for dance education, awarded fellowships and collaborated with other organisations to promote dance as a recreational sport as well as a profession.

Ausdance National represents the dance profession and coordinates a network of state organisations, including Ausdance ACT, Ausdance Qld, Ausdance SA, Ausdance WA and Ausdance Victoria.

== National Dance Awards ==
The Australian Dance Awards have been held since 1997, held first in the Sydney Opera House, then from 2008 to 2010 in Melbourne, and until 2017 by tender among the state-based organisations of the network. In 2018 Ausdance National hosted the event at the Brisbane Powerhouse in Brisbane, Queensland, and owing to the COVID-19 pandemic in Australia, the event was held online by the national body in 2020, covering the years 2018 and 2019.

== See also ==
- Dance in Australia
