= Dance Works =

Dance Works (sometimes called Danceworks) was a contemporary dance company based in Melbourne, Australia.

It was founded in 1983 by choreographer Nanette Hassall, who was Artistic Director until 1989. Dance Works developed experimental Australian choreography, and performed in town halls and other spaces as well as theatres.

Dance Works received the 1985 Sidney Myer Performing Arts Award for a group.

The company closed in 2006.
