= Graeme Murphy =

Australian choreographer

Graeme Murphy AO
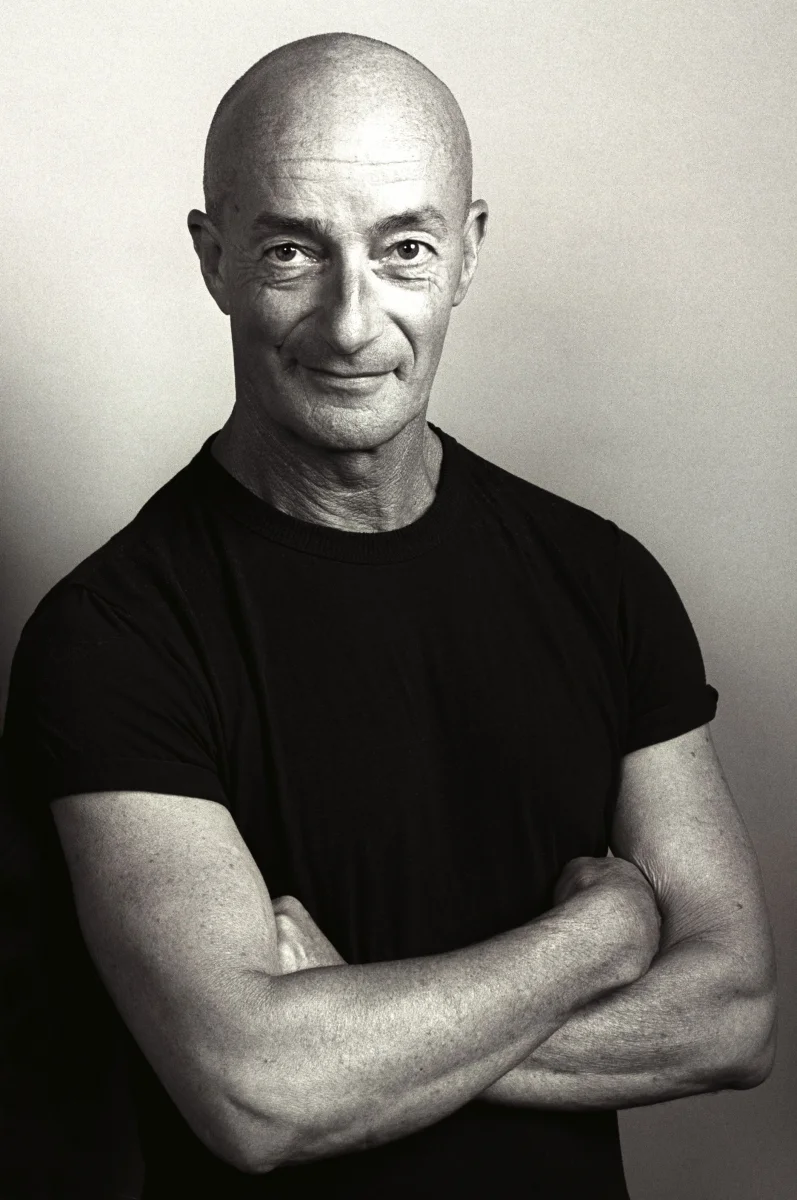
- Born: Graeme Lloyd Murphy; 2 November 1950 (age 76); Melbourne, Victoria, Australia
- Occupation: Choreographer
- Known for: Work with the Sydney Dance Company and The Australian Ballet

Graeme Lloyd Murphy AO (born 2 November 1950) is an Australian dancer and choreographer. With his fellow dancer (and wife since 2004) Janet Vernon, he guided Sydney Dance Company to become one of Australia's most successful and best-known dance companies.

== Biography ==
Murphy was born in Melbourne, and grew up in Tasmania, where he took dance classes with Sir Kenneth Gillespie in Launceston. He began his career as a student at the Australian Ballet School at the age of fourteen. In 1968 he became a dancer with The Australian Ballet where he had opportunities to choreograph. He toured America with the Australian Ballet in 1970–1971 and created his first ballet, Ecco le Diavole (Ecco). Ecco was presented at Melbourne's Princess Theatre in July 1971. The piece was set to music by Nino Rota and featured dancers Roslyn Anderson, Roma Egan, Janet Vernon, and Wendy Walker.

Later, Murphy danced with the Sadler's Wells Royal Ballet (now Birmingham Royal Ballet), and Les Ballets Félix Blaska in France. In 1975 he worked as a freelance choreographer. He rejoined The Australian Ballet in the early months of 1976 as both a dancer and as a resident choreographer. He was appointed as artistic director of the Dance Company of New South Wales in November 1976, renamed as Sydney Dance Company in 1979.

Murphy has been compared to the dancer and choreographer Jerome Robbins on account of the way he and his company marketed dance to a wider audience, bringing contemporary dance into a more commercial arena. Aside from his work in ballet, Murphy has also completed choreography for Torvill and Dean.

On 18 December 2004, after almost 40 years together as artistic and life partners, he and Janet Vernon married on their rural property outside Launceston.

In 2016 and 2017, Martin Portus (former Director of Marketing and Communication at the Australia Council for the Arts) conducted a number of interviews with Australian choreographers including Graeme Murphy. In the interview, Murphy discusses the highlights of various aspects of his career as a dancer and choreographer: his teenage training at The Australian Ballet School and early work as a classical dancer with the Australian Ballet; his developing interest in choreography and contemporary dance in the early 1970s; the beginnings of his lifelong creative partnership with Janet Vernon; the formation of the Sydney Dance Company and his appointment as artistic director in 1976; his signature productions involving theatrical spectacle, powerful storytelling, collaboration with Australian composers, and innovative set and costume designs; his constant touring overseas and work with Australian ballet; the financial disasters which prompted him to leave the Sydney Dance Company after 31 years; his work and aspirations.

== Honours ==
On 26 January 1988, Murphy was named a member of the Order of Australia for "his service to ballet." On 1 January 2001, he was awarded the Centenary Medal for "service to the development of dance in Australia and Tasmania". On 11 June 2012, Murphy was named an Officer of the Order of Australia for "distinguished service to the performing arts, both nationally and internationally, particularly ballet and contemporary dance, as a choreographer and director, and to the enhancement of Australia's cultural environment."

=== Helpmann Awards ===
The Helpmann Awards is an awards show, celebrating live entertainment and performing arts in Australia, presented by industry group Live Performance Australia (LPA) since 2001. In 2002, Murphy received the JC Williamson Award, the LPA's highest honour, for their life's work in live performance.

Year	Nominee / work	Award	Result
2002	Himself	JC Williamson Award	awarded

=== Mo Awards ===
The Australian Entertainment Mo Awards (commonly known informally as the Mo Awards), were annual Australian entertainment industry awards. They recognise achievements in live entertainment in Australia from 1975 to 2016.

Year	Nominee / work	Award	Result (wins only)
1999	Graeme Murphy	Male Dance Performer/ Choreographer of the Year	Won

== List of works ==
- After Venice (1984; set to Olivier Messiaen's Turangalîla-Symphonie and Gustav Mahler's 5th Symphony: Adagietto)
- Afterworlds (1987)
- Aida (2009; for Opera Australia)
- Air and Other Invisible Forces (1999; Michael Askill and Giya Kancheli)
- Bard Bits (1991; Cleo Laine and John Dankworth)
- Beauty and the Beast (1993; Carl Vine, Phil Buckle and Jack Jones)
- Berlin (Iva Davies and Max Lambert, based on material by Lou Reed, Bryan Ferry, David Bowie, David Byrne and others)
- Beyond Twelve (1980; set to Maurice Ravel's Piano Concerto in G)
- Body of Work (2000)
- Boxes (1985; with Bob Kretschmer; music by Iva Davies and Kretschmer)
- Daphnis and Chloé (1980; Ravel)
- Deadly Sins (1984; Lambert)
- The Director's Cut (2006; Paul Healy, Huey Benjamin, Margaret Sutherland)
- A Doll's House Story (Istvan Marta)
- Drill (Steve Martland)
- Ecco le Diavole (1971; Nino Rota)
- Ellipse (2002; Matthew Hindson)
- Embodied (1996; Alfred Schnittke)
- An Evening (1981)
- Evening Suite (1989)
- Ever After Ever (2007; Carl Vine, Giya Kancheli, Graeme Koehne, Matthew Hindson, Iva Davies, Max Lambert, Linda Nagle)
- Fire Earth Air Water (1977; John Tavener)
- Flashbacks (1983)
- Fornicon (1995; Martin Armiger)
- Free Radicals (1996; Michael Askill)
- Glimpses (1977; Margaret Sutherland)
- Grand (2005; Scott Davie)
- Hate (1982; Carl Vine)
- Homelands (1982: Leoš Janáček)
- Hua Mulan (2005; Michael Askill)
- In the Company of Women (1990; with Paul Mercurio)
- King Roger (1990; Karol Szymanowski)
- Kraanerg (1988; Iannis Xenakis)
- Late Afternoon of a Faun (1987)
- Limited Edition (1982; Graeme Koehne)
- Mythes (Szymanowski)
- Mythologia (2000; Carl Vine)
- Nearly Beloved (1986; Graeme Koehne)
- Nutcracker: the Story of Clara (2009–1992 Pyotr Ilyich Tchaikovsky; for the Australian Ballet)
- Papillon Duet (1977; Jacques Offenbach)
- Party (1998: Michael and Daniel Askill)
- Piano Sonata (1992; Carl Vine)
- Poppy (1978; Carl Vine)
- The Protecting Veil (1993; John Tavener)
- Radical Study (1996)
- Romeo and Juliet (2011 Sergei Prokofiev; for the Australian Ballet)
- Rumours (1978–1979; Barry Conyngham)
- Salome (Michael Askill)
- Scintillation (1977; Carlos Salzedo)
- The Selfish Giant (1983; Graeme Koehne)
- Sensing (1994; Ross Edwards)
- Sequenza VII (1977; Luciano Berio)
- Shades of Gray (2005)
- Shéhérazade (1979; Ravel)
- Shining (1986; Szymanowski)
- Signatures (1979; Alexander Scriabin)
- Sirens (1985; with 4 other choreographers)
- Soft Bruising (1990; with Steve Martland; music by Gavin Bryars)
- Some Rooms (1983; Keith Jarrett, Joseph Canteloube, Francis Poulenc, Benjamin Britten, Samuel Barber)
- Song of the Night (1989; Szymanowski)
- Suite Synergy (2011; with Michael Askill)
- Swan Lake (Tchaikovsky; for the Australian Ballet)
- Synergy with Synergy (1992; Michael Askill, John Cage, Elliott Carter, Ross Edwards, Istvan Marta and Nigel Westlake)
- Third Conversation (1977; Béla Bartók)
- Tip (1977; Carl Vine)
- Tivoli (2001; Graeme Koehne)
- The Trojans (1994; Hector Berlioz)
- Turandot (Giacomo Puccini; for Opera Australia)
- Up (1977; György Ligeti)
- Vast (1988; Barry Conyngham)
- Viridian (1980; Richard Meale)
- Volumina (1977; Ligeti)
- Water (2009; for The Shanghai Ballet)
- Wilderness (1982; Bartók)
