= Sydney Dance Company =

Australian contemporary dance company

- Formerly: Ballet in a Nutshell; Athletes and Dancers; Dance Company (NSW)
- Founded: 1969; 57 years ago
- Founder: Suzanne Musitz
- Headquarters: Australia

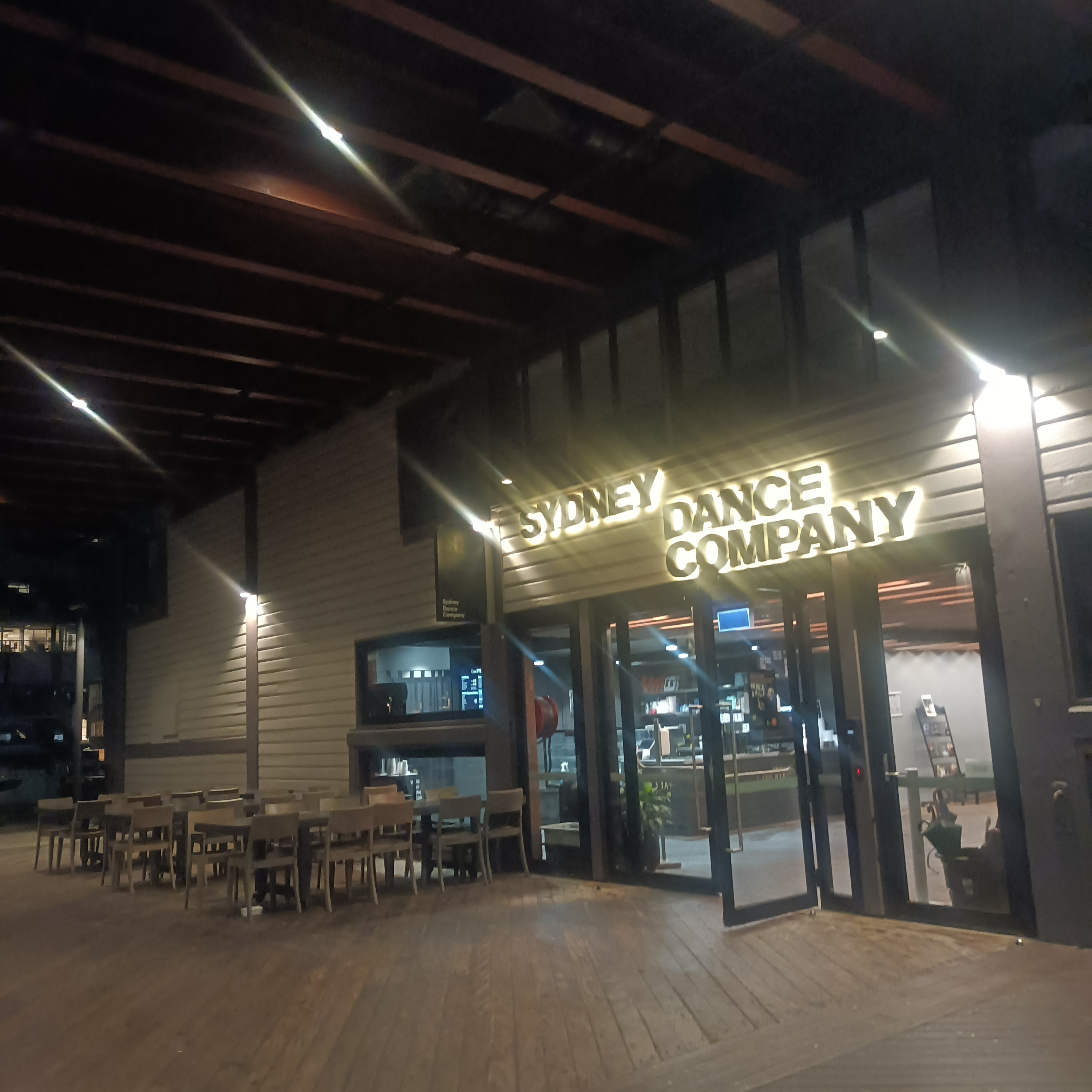
A Sydney Dance Company sign above an entrance to the Wharf theatres at pier 4/5. 2026

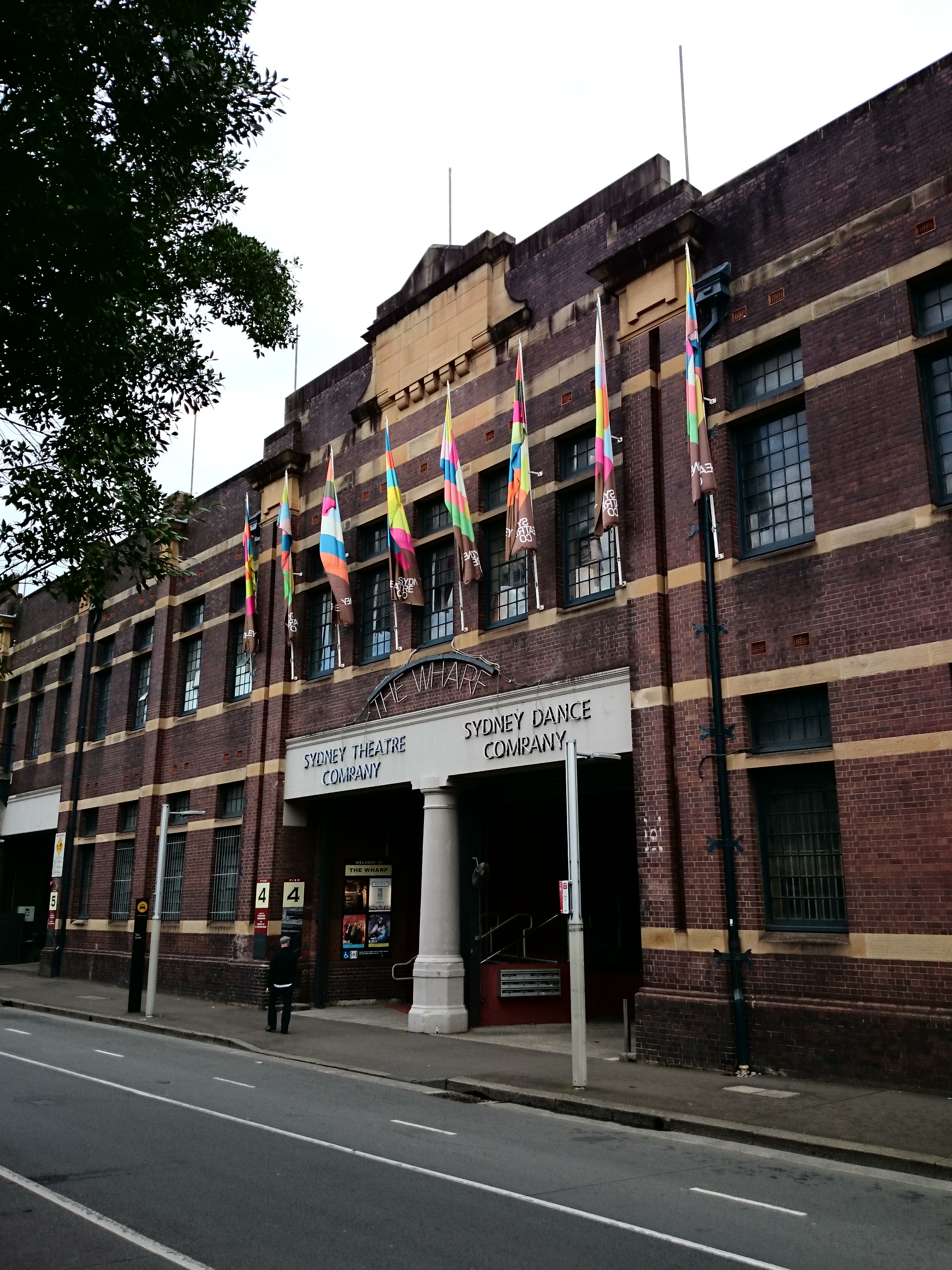
The Wharf Theatres in Pier 4/5 Dawes Point, host performances by numerous cultural groups including the Sydney Theatre Company and the Sydney Dance Company. There are five dance studios located in Pier 4/5 that are run by the Sydney Dance Company and are used to create, rehearse, teach and perform dance in. 2014

Sydney Dance Company is a contemporary dance company in Australia. They have performed at the Sydney Opera House in Australia, the Joyce Theater in New York, the Shanghai Grand Theatre in China, and the Stanislavsky Theatre in Moscow.

== History ==
Sydney Dance Company was founded in 1969 as the dance-in-education group Ballet in a Nutshell by Suzanne Musitz (Davidson), later changing its name to Athletes and Dancers, and Dance Company (NSW).

From 1975 to 1976, the company was led by Dutch choreographer Jaap Flier and later by Australian choreographer Graeme Murphy in 1976. In 1979, Graeme Murphy and his wife, Janet Vernon, also a dancer, renamed the company as Sydney Dance Company and served as artistic directors for three decades. During their tenure, the company became the first Western contemporary dance company to perform in the People's Republic of China.

Company productions have incorporated works from notable musicians. The production Some Rooms (1983) featured a selection of existing music by composers such as Keith Jarrett, Francis Poulenc, Benjamin Britten, and Samuel Barber. Hate (1982) featured a score by the Australian composer Carl Vine, and the 1985 production Boxes included original music by composer and musician Iva Davies.

In May 2007, the company announced that Tanja Liedtke as its new artistic director; however on 17 August of that year Liedtke was killed in a traffic accident in the northern suburbs of Sydney.

In December 2007, Executive Director Noel Staunton launched the company's 2008 season, announcing three guest choreographers, Meryl Tankard, Rafael Bonachela and Aszure Barton, to create new works for the company. Bonachela was subsequently appointed the Company's new Artistic Director.

In December 2008, Foxtel signed a three-year sponsorship of the company involving special broadcasts and incorporating the company into subscription television programs Australia's Next Top Model and Project Runway Australia.

In 2009, Anne Dunn was appointed Executive Director of the Company.

Rafael Bonachela has been the artistic director of the company since 2009. His first commissioned work for the company, 360°, was as a guest choreographer. His works include unfold (2009), 6 Breaths (2010), LANDforms (2011) and 2 One Another (2012), Irony of Fate, Soledad, and The Land of Yes & The Land of No. He has worked with guest choreographers Kenneth Kvarnstrom (Mercury 2009), Adam Linder (Are We That We Are 2010), Emanuel Gat (Satisfying Musical Moments 2010), and Jacopo Godani (Raw Models 2011). Other guest choreographers include Alexander Ekman and Gideon Obarzanek, as well as collaborations with the Australian Chamber Orchestra and the Sydney Symphony Orchestra and with composers 48nord and Ezio Bosso.

In 2014, the company announced it was granted permission to perform William Forsythe's 1993 work Quintett. The work is set to Gavin Bryars' Jesus' Blood Never Failed Me Yet.

== Notable alumni ==
- Gideon Obarzanek, founder and former artistic director of Melbourne dance company Chunky Move
- Paul Mercurio who has gone on to make several movies including Strictly Ballroom which was directed by Baz Luhrmann.
- Stephen Page, now choreographer and director of Bangarra Dance Theatre
- Josef Brown, who has been playing the lead character Johnny Castle in the stage version of Dirty Dancing since it opened in Sydney in 2004

== Awards ==
=== Mo Awards ===
The Australian Entertainment Mo Awards (commonly known informally as the Mo Awards), were annual Australian entertainment industry awards. They recognised achievements in live entertainment in Australia from 1975 to 2016. Sydney Dance Company won two awards in that time.

Year	Nominee / work	Award	Result (wins only)
1989	Sydney Dance Company	Dance Performance of the Year	Won
1990	Sydney Dance Company - King Roger	Dance Performance of the Year	Won
