= Hélène Kirsova =

Danish prima ballerina (1910–1962)

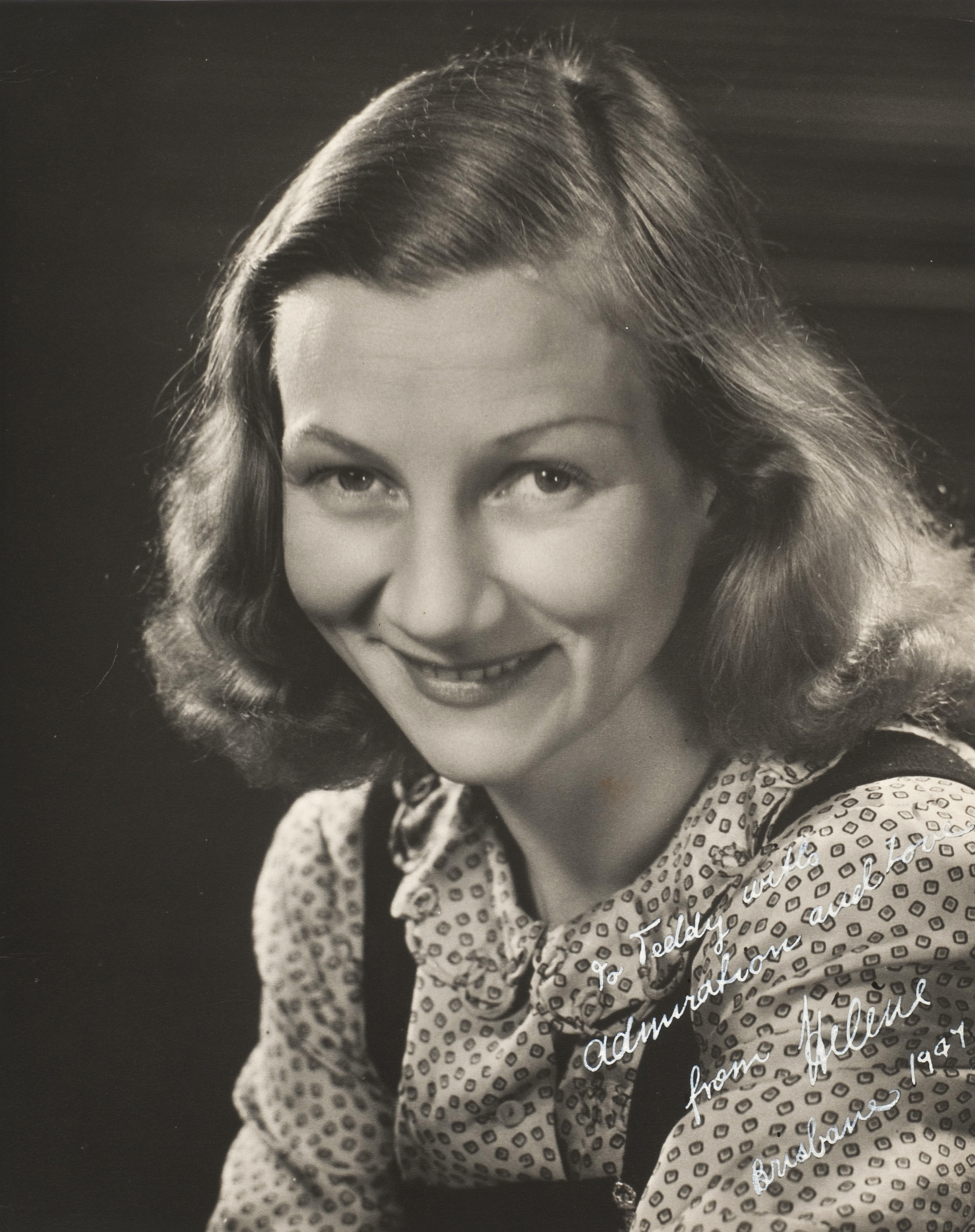
- Helene Kirsova, ballerina, ca. 1941 – photographer Bitter-Jeppesen Studios, Melbourne (4439479907) Kirsova c. 1941
- Born: Ellen Elisabeth Kirsten Wittrup Hansèn; 18 June 1910; Copenhagen, Denmark
- Died: 22 February 1962 (aged 51); London, England
- Citizenship: Denmark
- Education: Emilie Walbom; Jenny Møller; Michel Fokine; Olga Preobrajenska; Léo Staats; Lyubov Yegorova; Nikolai Legat; Margaret Craske
- Occupations: Prima Ballerina; Choreographer; Ballet teacher; Ballet company director
- Years active: 1920—1947
- Spouse(s): Erick Fischer (m. 1937; div. 1947) Peter Bellew (m. 1948)
- Children: Ole Fischer; Ib Bellew
- Career
- Former groups: Le Ballet Franco Russe; Les Ballets Ida Rubinstein; Les Ballets Russes de Monte- Carlo; Ballets de Monte-Carlo; Monte Carlo Russian Ballet; Kirsova Ballet

Hélène Kirsova (18 June 1910 – 22 February 1962) was a Danish prima ballerina, choreographer and ballet teacher and is noted as the founder of the first professional ballet company in Australia. She trained in Paris with former Sergei Diaghilev ballet dancers and choreographers. She then performed in companies run by Léo Staats and Ida Rubinstein before in 1931 becoming a soloist with Les Ballets Russes de Monte Carlo, dancing for several years in Europe and North America. In 1936, as a principal dancer, she joined René Blum's Les Ballets de Monte-Carlo in which she scored a singular success in London. Later that year she joined Colonel Wassily de Basil's Monte Carlo Russian Ballet as prima ballerina on an extensive tour of Australia and New Zealand where she was fêted by critics and audiences. She remained in Australia, started a ballet school in Sydney, and in 1941 formed the Kirsova Ballet. Despite wartime restrictions she directed the company for several years before retiring in 1948. She has been described as the "Godmother" of Australian ballet.

== Early life ==
Ellen Elisabeth Kirsten Wittrup Hansèn, later professionally known as Hélène Kirsova, was born in the Danish capital of Copenhagen (København ) on 18 June 1910, the youngest of four children. Her father, Christian Sophüs Ferdinand Hansèn, who was born in Rørvig, Denmark in 1874, was a restaurateur and garage owner. Her mother was Ingeborg Marie Katrine Vittrup or Wittrup born in 1872 in Ålborg, Denmark.

As a small child, Kirsova watched one of her elder sisters dance using Dalcroze eurhythmics, and secretly in her own room at night danced by herself. When she was 8 or 9 she was taken to the Royal Danish Theatre where, to the choreography of Michel Fokine, three Russian ballets were given: Les Sylphides, Petrushka and the ballet from Prince Igor. After that performance she resolved to be a dancer and perform those same ballets.

Adopting her mother's maiden name (Wittrup) as her surname, Kirsova began ballet classes in Copenhagen with Emilie Walbom. Walbom, a Danish ballet dancer and choreographer with the Royal Danish Ballet, set up her ballet school – Fru Walbom's Balletskole – in 1910. It became popular with the daughters of the Copenhagen bourgeoisie though Walbom was particularly interested in those girls, like Kirsova, who wanted to become professional dancers. She ended each season with a performance by her students, which enabled Kirsova to give her first appearances in public. Kirsova also attended classes given by Jenny Møller who started teaching in Copenhagen in 1919 when Kirsova was nine. She also trained briefly with Michel Fokine during his stay in Denmark in 1918–19.

Kirsova became a very popular student ballet dancer as a teenager in Copenhagen, and before she was 18 she was presented with a crown-shaped gold brooch scattered with diamonds by King Christian X of Denmark who was delighted with her dancing. She wore the brooch throughout her life.

== Training in Paris ==
When Walbom closed her school in 1928, the 18-year-old Kirsova begged her parents to be allowed to move to Paris to further her ballet training. At the time, bourgeois families thought ballet to be a morally suspect occupation, only suitable for working-class girls trying to escape their backgrounds, and so they were reluctant to let their daughter go, but finally consented. There have been suggestions that Kirsova "ran away to Paris" when she was 16 and that when in Paris she had to cut off her hair and sell it in order to survive. Kirsova kept her year of birth secret throughout her career and as a result she was generally considered to be one or two years younger than her real age, which may have engendered the idea that she left for Paris when she was 16. No evidence has been found to support the story about selling her hair.

In Paris in 1928 Kirsova was tutored by some of the most prominent ballet teachers of the time, Olga Preobrajenska, Léo Staats, and, predominantly, Lyubov Yegorova. Preobrajenska was Russian and had trained at the Imperial Ballet School in Saint Petersburg, Russia, and went on to dance as a prima ballerina with the Russian Imperial Ballet. In 1923, after the 1917 Russian Revolution, she opened her studio in Paris, taking the largest of the rooms at the Salle Wacker at 69 Rue de Douai. Staats was French and had been a premier danseur at the Opéra de Paris and had then become the Opéra's premier maître de ballet. He opened his school in Rue Saulnier, just behind the Folies Bergère, in 1926. Yegorova, another Russian, also trained in Saint Petersburg before dancing as a prima ballerina for the Imperial Russian Ballet and Sergei Diaghilev's Ballets Russes. In 1923 she began to teach in Paris as head of the Ballets Russes school at 15 Rue de la Rochefoucauld.

== Le Ballet Franco Russe ==
Kirsova flourished in the Russian ballet tradition under her various tutors in Paris and it was Léo Staats who was instrumental in launching her international professional career. In 1929 she had been training with him for only a week when, recognising her talent, he invited her to become a member of his Le Ballet Franco Russe, the first new ballet company to be formed after the recent death of Serge Diaghilev. Within a short time Kirsova, then still known as Ellen Wittrup, was touring South America with the company. Kirsova won immediate recognition dancing in favourite classic ballets by choreographers Michel Fokine and Marius Petipa. Staats commented on her performances: "She is one of the best young dancers of today and will be a star of tomorrow."

Returning to Paris when the company was disbanded after three months touring, Kirsova continued strenuous study for another eight months with Staats and Yegorova.

== Les Ballets Ida Rubinstein ==
Following an audition late in 1929 with the choreographers Léonide Massine and Bronislava Nijinska, Kirsova joined the Paris-based troupe of Ida Rubinstein named Les Ballets Ida Rubinstein, which had been founded a year before. Rubinstein had trained in Moscow and St Petersburg and Serge Diaghilev brought her to his Ballets Russes in Paris. A dancer of somewhat limited abilities due to a late start in training, she made up for up it with tremendous stage presence and "gestural expressiveness and sexual daring". She was one of the few female ballet directors of her era.

Nijinska, as Rubinstein's principal choreographer, brought to the company youngsters like Kirsova "who would prove themselves in the years to come". Many of them were to work in the post-Diaghilev Ballets Russes and then move on to prominent status in the ballet world. Rubinstein had inherited great wealth and was able to support large, lavish and significant ballets in which Kirsova made her first appearances on the Parisian stage and in houses around Europe.

The engagement with Rubinstein afforded Kirsova the opportunity to make her first appearances at the Palais Garnier opera house in Paris and, though not yet a leading dancer, to be noticed. As well as further seasons in Paris, Kirsova toured with the company on various engagements around Europe, including in Monte-Carlo, Milan, Rome, and Vienna. In July 1931 the company also travelled to London for a Royal Opera House season which the writer on ballet Arnold Haskell described as a "magnificent failure". London saw Kirsova's final appearances with the Rubinstein company. Before returning to Paris, she took the opportunity to study with the former Russian dancer Nikolai Legat, who had been a premier dancer with the Russian Imperial Ballet, and with the English-born Margaret Craske, who had studied under Enrico Cecchetti.

Kirsova's time with Rubinstein brought her under the influence of Nijinska, who Kirsova later claimed taught her the secrets of timing and elevation. Additionally, some of the style and brio which Rubinstein brought to the commissioning of work for her company – using leading composers, librettists, designers and artists and producing new and original modern work rather than always relying on the classics – influenced Kirsova's artistic decisions and commissioning choices when ten years later she was leading her own ballet company in Australia.

== Les Ballets Russes de Monte Carlo ==
Back in Paris in the summer of 1931, Kirsova continued to train and take classes with Lyubov Yegorova, who, aware of the penury in which most professional dancers were living in Paris at that time (they were paid only when actually working), encouraged Kirsova to take her classes without charge.

That summer, René Blum, a French theatrical impresario and artistic director of the Opéra de Monte-Carlo in Monaco, and Wassily de Basil, a Russian ballet impresario, began the creation of a new ballet company, known at that time as Ballets de Monte-Carlo. The compulsion was to continue the work and legacy of Diaghilev, the founder of the Ballets Russes, who had died in 1929, by filling the void after his troupe's collapse. The new company contracted two choreographers, George Balanchine and Léonide Massine, who set about hiring dancers.

The nucleus of the new company was formed with established members of the old Diaghilev Ballets Russes, but the two choreographers wanted to "infuse it with new blood on the ballerina level". The death of Diaghilev in 1929 and of Anna Pavlova in 1931 and the subsequent closure of their dance companies had left Paris, then the dance centre of Europe, full of unemployed dancers, Kirsova among them, who haunted the two back rooms of "a small, remarkably unlovely establishment" called Café Mocca just behind the Palais Garnier, which functioned as a dancers' social club. All the dancers there were struggling to find work, and competition to join the new ballet company was intense.

Kirsova had the advantage that her reputation with the Rubinstein troupe was well established (and it had been Massine, along with Nijinska, who had brought her into that company) and she had already attracted favourable notice. Though she was by now 21, and somewhat older than the so-called Baby Ballerinas, she was thought to be only about 19, and so was encouraged by Balanchine and Massine to try for the new Monte-Carlo troupe. She auditioned before Blum, de Basil, Balanchine and Serge Lifar in a small classroom at the Théâtre Mogador studio in Paris. Lifar, who had taught her her first adagio lesson at Egorova's studio, did some adagio work with her and she was immediately engaged for the company as a soloist.

However, in a troupe that would be perceived by the public to be mostly Russian, de Basil insisted that the name with which Kirsova had been working, Ellen Wittrup, should be Russified. A move from "Ellen" to "Lena" was quickly achieved, but the name "Wittrup" resisted any simple form of conversion to a Russian-sounding name. Accordingly, "Kirsova" was chosen for her, and she initially used the name "Lena Kirsova" professionally before changing the first name again to the more French "Hélène". (Until her marriage in 1938 she continued to travel under her real name of Ellen Wittrup-Hansen.)

By late October 1931 the company of about 30 dancers, still in Paris, was assembled. In December they began working on their first ballet.

=== Monte-Carlo ===
At the beginning of 1932, the company moved to Monte-Carlo and their first presentation was at a gala on 17 January, Monaco's national holiday, at the Opéra de Monte-Carlo. A number of ballets were seen in the early months of 1932 as part of the Monte-Carlo opera season which began on 21 January. The ballet season, featuring what was now known as Les Ballet Russes de Monte-Carlo, opened on 12 April 1932. As the season progressed new ballets were introduced. At this time Kirsova was still billed as "Lena Kirsova".

=== European tour ===
The first season in Monte-Carlo was regarded as a major success, and offers came in for a European tour, beginning in Paris at the Théâtre des Champs-Elysées on 9 June 1932. The Ballets Russes historian, Vicente García-Márquez, has written that "The audience was ecstatic and reviews rapturous. The new Ballets Russes had conquered Paris ..."

After Paris there were further engagements at Antwerp, in the south-west of Germany, and in Switzerland with theatres packed to capacity every night, though despite this achievement money was always short. The company travelled in two buses rented from the Garage Pigalle in Paris with scenery and costumes stacked on the roofs. Morning classes were conducted by the company's ballet mistress Lubov Tchernicheva at the side of the road, the dancers using fences at the edges of fields as barres. The performers struggled to be paid enough money to settle their hotel bills.

The tour concluded with three nights in Geneva from 28 November to 1 December 1932. The company returned to Paris and the dancers were laid off until after Christmas, though throughout December they were expected to rehearse the new ballets for the 1933 Monte-Carlo season.

=== Return to Monte-Carlo ===
At the turn of 1932/1933 the company assembled once more in Monaco. Kirsova had been promoted from soloist to principal, and had made a change in her first name from Lena to Hélène, the name she was to use both professionally and personally for the rest of her life (though in Britain and North America she would sometimes be billed as "Helene" without the accents and sometimes as an anglicised "Helen").

Massine, rather than Balanchine, was now the premier maître de ballet and choreographer of the company but the schedule in Monte-Carlo was the same as the previous year. The opera season ran from 5 January to 9 April with the ballet company supporting it while rehearsing their new spring season, which began on 13 April. Kirsova appeared in at least one of the classic ballets staged in Monte-Carlo that spring: Les Sylphides. It was a part that within a few months was to bring her triumphant notices when the company appeared in London.

=== Barcelona and Paris ===
When the spring season in Monte-Carlo came to an end, the company played seven performances at the Gran Teatre del Liceu in Barcelona, Spain from 13 May. From there, the company moved to Paris to dance for four Russian operas playing at the Théâtre du Châtelet and afterwards at the same theatre a short but well-praised ballet season of their own. Kirsova attracted praise in Les Sylphides, one critic claiming that, with three of her colleagues, she could not be "surpassed by any other dancers of the moment".

The company left Paris for a three-week season in London. It was to be a significant engagement for Kirsova because for her it was a notable success and brought her lasting esteem.

=== London ===
Dropping the definite article from the start of their name, Ballets Russes de Monte Carlo opened at the Alhambra Theatre in London on 4 July 1933. They "took the city by storm". Kirsova danced the waltz in Les Sylphides on that opening night and the British ballet critic PW Manchester recalled her "glorious back" and remembered her performance as "better than anybody I ever saw, except [Tamara] Karsavina. It was a totally different way of doing it, but magnificent."

London's ballet audiences took Ballets Russes de Monte Carlo to their hearts and the three-week season was an "unexpected" triumph. As a result, it was unprecedentedly extended to four months, to 30 October 1933. The elongated season gave London the chance to see the world premiere on 24 October of a Massine ballet, Choreartium. Massine created Kirsova's first special role in this, in which she was partnered by Yurek Shabelevsky and Leon Woizikovsky. It was another opportunity for the critics to praise her. Arnold Haskell wrote that Kirsova in this role appeared to be of "finely-tempered steel".

Soon after the London season came to an end Kirsova took part in her first-ever television broadcast. For six months, the British Broadcasting Corporation (BBC) had been experimenting with ultra-low-definition live television broadcasting in the London area, transmitting barely-distinguishable pictures. The programmes went out late at night from a tiny studio in Portland Place, London. At 11.10pm on 3 November, in a performing area 1.8 metres wide by 1.2 metres deep, nine artists of the Ballets Russes staged 30 minutes of ballet scenes. The music was provided by a quartet from the Alhambra orchestra, with the musical director sitting on the piano because of lack of space. It is not known how many viewers saw Kirsova in this programme, but the number of television receivers on which it could be watched at that time numbered only 5000 at the most.

A short English tour followed the season at the Alhambra, starting at Golders Green in north London, then Plymouth in south-west England, Streatham in south London, Bournemouth on the south coast of England, and Birmingham in the English Midlands.

=== The United States ===
On 12 December 1933, the company set sail from Plymouth for New York City in the United States on the Compagnie Générale Transatlantique SS Lafayette. It was Kirsova's first trip outside the continent of Europe (and her first voyage on rough seas; she was violently sea-sick for a couple of days). On board the liner were the 64 members of the troupe, 84 backdrops and curtains, 6,000 costumes, a 50-piece orchestra, and 22 ballets. On arrival in the United States the Ballets Russes opened a season at one of the largest theatres on Broadway, the St. James Theatre, on 22 December.

In the opening week the receipts were poor, as audiences failed to appreciate the modern repertoire, but with a change of programme to more traditional Diaghilev-style ballets, with leading roles for Kirsova, the number of tickets sold improved markedly, to the extent that the theatre invoked a contractual "stop clause" to prevent the company leaving on their US tour. Their touring obligations consequently in jeopardy, de Basil and Sol Hurok, the American promoter, split the company in two, with half remaining in New York and the other half departing on an exhausting tour. The troupe was reunited in Chicago in February 1934 and continued, under its new US name Monte Carlo Ballet Russe, to tour increasingly successfully around the United States.

Audiences were cool to Kirsova at the start of the US tour as she was not publicised and promoted relentlessly in the way de Basil's 12-, 13- and 14-year old "Baby Ballerinas" were, but by the close of an extended tour in April 1934 critics were increasingly appreciating her talents and wrote of her as one of the Ballets Russes' "leading performers".

At the end of the tour of North America the company sailed for France on the CGT French Line SS Paris.

=== Return to Barcelona and Paris ===
Due to the extension of the US tour, the company was unable to perform in Monte-Carlo and went straight to Barcelona for a short successful season at the Liceu from 10 May 1934.

From there the company moved on to Paris, opening at the Théâtre de Champs-Élysées on 4 June. In a season lasting to 16 June the company broke all the theatre's attendance records.

=== Return to London ===
Three days after closing in Paris the company opened a new season in London, under a new name. They were now known as Ballets Russes de Col W de Basil, a change that caused a breach between de Basil and Blum. This time the company were based at the Royal Opera House, Covent Garden and the first performance took place on 19 June. Vicente García-Márquez has reported that "it was an extraordinary event, comparable to the Diaghilev company's London debut at Covent Garden in 1911".

Kirsova had returned to the city of her greatest acclaim and was able to repeat her previous London successes in ballets like Les Sylphides, Choreartium, and Le Beau Danube and also drew the admiring attention of the critics to her humorous performance in La Boutique fantasque.

The London gossip columns also sought out Kirsova off-stage. One admired her "poise" and "intelligent eyes" and remarked that "quite a lot of pure Cockney" learnt from the porters in the fruit and flower market in which the Opera House stood "is finding its way into her vocabulary".

On stage, Kirsova was equally admired: "Praise for the young Hélène Kirsova ... is unalloyed", wrote one observer, adding that "Kirsova should be capable before long of shining like Karsavina, Lopokova and Danilova shone in the nineteen-twenties".

=== Return to North America ===
Another American tour followed. September found the company at the Palacio de Bellas Artes in Mexico City. The troupe struggled for breath control at an altitude of 2,240 metres with every performance there marred by fainting dancers until they could become acclimatised, but all the performances were sold out and the company won standing ovations. After four weeks in Mexico City, the company travelled by sea to New York and thence by rail to Montreal in Canada at the beginning of another North American tour with seasons in the most important cities, and in 90 towns, "a series of exhausting and seemingly endless one-night stands".

The tour spanned 32,000 kilometres (20,000 miles) in seven months utilising a special train comprising passenger cars and eleven baggage cars to convey the personnel, the scenery, costumes and equipment before finishing up for five performances, "tired and little ragged around the edges of their dance patterns" at the small Majestic Theatre on Broadway in New York, no more suitable theatre being available, in March 1935.

North American newspapers hailed Kirsova's performances on this tour, one of them describing her as "one of the finest dancers of today", but, exhausted by over three years of constant rehearsals, performances and travel, and with little time available to concentrate on honing her technique and development, she left the Ballets Russes and returned to Paris for an intensive eight months of continual study with her former teachers, Staats, Egorova, and occasionally Preobrajenska.

== Ballets de Monte-Carlo ==
Léon Blum, by this time completely independent of de Basil and the Ballets Russes, was setting up his own new ballet company for Monte-Carlo to be called Ballets de Monte-Carlo, and had engaged Michel Fokine as his premier maître de ballet and choreographer. They invited the refreshed and reinvigorated Kirsova to join the company as a principal dancer.

=== Monte-Carlo ===
Blum was anxious for a successful maiden season in Monte-Carlo so as to attract the attention of London and New York impresarios. The company opened at the Théâtre de Monte-Carlo on 4 April 1936. As well as some of the classics there were two new ballets by Fokine: Don Juan and L'Épreuve d'amour, the latter featuring Kirsova in a "memorable" creation of Papillon in a shimmering butterfly costume designed by the French artist André Derain. Kirsova's contribution was much hailed, one critic declaring that "Madame Kirsova won the delighted approval of an enthusiastic audience". The Monte-Carlo season was "one of the most successful on record".

=== London ===
With this achievement, the company moved on to London where they opened with 48 artists at the Alhambra Theatre on 15 May 1936 for a two-month season.

The company attracted outstandingly good reviews, with many favouring Kirsova. She "danced with authority", "dances delightfully as the teasing Butterfly of Fokine's Chinese ballet", "grace and charm of this clever ballerina", "The Butterfly, most piquantly danced by Hélène Kirsova", "Kirsova lighter than ever", "Mme Kirsova ... really flawless", "Mdlle Helen Kirsova was an outstandingly good Papillon", "Helene Kirsova .. at the top of [her] form", and "Kirsova (whom watch)". But despite her impressive personal reviews, Kirsova had been "all too little used", a neglect which may have prompted her to leave Blum's company when the opportunity shortly presented itself.

In spite of the early box office success of the season, the impresario, Sir Oswald Stoll, thought the season would benefit from guest artists and, to the annoyance of Blum and his company, in June Stoll brought in Leon Woizikovsky and three other leading dancers from Woizikovsky's own company. Also in London, de Basil's Ballets Russes opened at the Royal Opera House on 15 June for a six-week season. There was delight amongst English ballet lovers at having have three major companies in town simultaneously, a buzz of excitement matched by the company members as gossip and rumour spread that de Basil was setting up a second Ballets Russes company to tour Australia and New Zealand. Suddenly London, rather than Paris, was the international balletic recruiting ground.

== Monte Carlo Russian Ballet ==
With remarkable speed the second Ballets Russes company for the Australasian tour was set up and was named Colonel W de Basil's Monte Carlo Russian Ballet. About twenty of the recruited dancers came from the Ballets de Leon Woizikovsky company, which had just declared bankruptcy. Further dancers came from the main de Basil company and from Blum's Ballet de Monte-Carlo, whose acclaimed run at the Alhambra had just ended, together with a number of new discoveries from Paris and elsewhere. Kirsova, described by Arnold Haskell at the time as a "fine dancer", was invited to join the new company, for the first time in the rank of prima ballerina, to be the company's leading female dancer, a position she held jointly with Valentina Blinova. The two women and Woizikovsky were the stars of the new troupe.

The writer Michael Salter has observed in his biography of Edouard Borovansky that this second Ballets Russes company "was in no sense a collection of second raters. Woizikovsky was one of the great names of Russian ballet, a former Diaghilev principal who had no superiors in his field, and Hélène Kirsova ... was a ballerina of considerable stature". He goes on to observe that Igor Yousskevitch and Roland Guerard, also in the company, were among the finest classical male dancers of the period, and Tamara Tchinarova was a soloist "of individuality, strength, and extraordinary beauty".

By 20 July contracts were being made with the dancers and in August those recruited started an intensive three-week course in the repertoire. 22 already existing works were cast, learned and costumed and their sets built. Arnold Haskell described the speed with which the new company was set up, writing that it "had been formed in a hurry; conceived six weeks before sailing, finally decided upon three weeks before sailing, and completed almost upon the station platform". Some important documents were signed at the Gare de Lyon in Paris, "two of the chief executives nearly missing their train".

=== To Australia ===
At the end of August 1936, the new company sailed from Tilbury, on the River Thames, on the P&O SS Moldavia. Kirsova was with 16 other members of the company to join the ship in Marseille. The weeks on the voyage were not wasted as rehearsals continued every day from nine o'clock in the morning on a roped-off area of the top deck. Valerie Lawson, in her history of ballet in Australia, reports that in the evenings Kirsova played poker with Woizikovsky and his friends. When the 62-member company arrived at Port Adelaide, South Australia on 10 October, Kirsova was listed as a Danish alien under her real name Ellen Wittrup-Hansèn. The company was to tour Australia and New Zealand for sixteen weeks. There were 51 dancers in the troupe, augmented in the larger ballets by local dancers and students. Kirsova, as a prima ballerina, was to find herself publicised in a way she had not experienced before, including being recruited by advertisers to promote products. One advertisement read: "Mlle Kirsova uses and recommends Mercolized Wax, the world-famous face cream". But despite being a leading dancer with the company and much in the public eye she was to be paid only 15 shillings a week.

=== Adelaide ===
The opening night on 13 October 1936 at the Theatre Royal in Adelaide was only three days after the company's arrival and coincided with the city's centenary.

Kirsova's first appearance on an Australian stage was in the opening night performance of Les Sylphides, dancing the pas de deux with Igor Youskevitch. Of that night she later said: "One felt the eagerness, the tension of an audience approaching a strange theatrical experience which it had long been denied – for although Australia had seen great individual dancers like Pavlova, Genée and Spessiva, this was their first introduction to Russian Ballet on a full scale. ... From this moment there grew up an audience for Ballet, eager for it, appreciative of it, willing to support it."

Arnold Haskell in "Dancing Around the World" reports that this first performance in Adelaide was a "triumphant success" and that in a city of only 250,000 inhabitants the theatre was nearly full for eighteen days "and the season could have continued another eighteen days so great was the enthusiasm". The enthusiasm was not matched, however, by uniformly positive reviews, some being particularly damning.

Kirsova's reputation after her great success at the Alhambra in London had preceded her to Australia. During the season in Adelaide some fans complained that they were not being allowed to see enough of her and hoped "that the management might be able to allow us to see more of an artiste of whom we have read and heard so much".

=== Orchestral problems ===
A serious problem was apparent regarding the orchestra in Adelaide, and indeed at other venues throughout the tour. Australia and New Zealand had a shortage of experienced, high-quality orchestral players available for theatres, a problem exacerbated by the recent expansion of the Australian Broadcasting Commission (ABC). The impresarios responsible for the tour, theatrical management company and theatre owners J.C.Williamson, employed local musicians for the Ballets Russes tour, but few of them had any ensemble experience.

Jascha Horenstein, who had much European concert experience but little experience of ballet, was employed by de Basil as conductor for the tour, but he was unable to persuade his inexperienced pit orchestras to reach an acceptable standard. Wireless Weekly put it bluntly: "The orchestra rarely rose above the level of fair rehearsal. In some cases the music was obviously too difficult for the players. Jascha Horenstein ... made the only possible decision – he determined at all costs to keep the band playing until the last bar".

=== Melbourne ===
The company left Adelaide by special train at midnight on 28 October on a fifteen-hour journey, bound for Melbourne, Victoria and an opening night at His Majesty's Theatre on 31 October.

The Melbourne orchestra of professionals and amateurs, new to the scores, was ragged and struggling. One critic wrote: "Hélène Kirsova alone rose superior to the ordeal and floated light as thistledown in the arms of Igor Youskevitch". The orchestral problem persisted throughout the tour, even to the end. A critic commenting on the music when the troupe returned to Melbourne was a damning: "Orchestra Inadequate".

Despite difficulties with the bands, Kirsova was steadily working her way into the hearts of the critics and the Australian audiences. It was the start of "a tremendous public following". One observer wrote of her performance in Les Sylphides that "Kirsova, svelte in shimmering grace, distinguished herself ... in the pas de deux". Towards the end of the season in Melbourne, Kirsova's pas de deux with Guerard in Scuola di Ballo was acclaimed as "a delicious fragment, bubbling with high spirits and humour". Haskell wrote of her portrayal of the "shy, brilliant bird" in The Firebird as "one of the most perfect things seen in this or any other season". The Australian dance writer and archivist, Michelle Potter, has suggested that "perhaps the roles for which she was most praised in the Australian press were those of the Ballerina in Petrushka and, especially when partnered by Igor Youskevitch, Columbine in Le Carnaval. Her performances in Les Sylphides were also especially admired, as was her portrayal of the widow in L'Amour sorcier". Haskell said of Kirsova at this stage of the tour that her mazurka in Les Sylphides revealed to the full her "gifts of elevation, strength and precision".

The dancers were not acclimatised to the excessive heat and humidity in Melbourne and the resulting fatigue on one night affected Kirsova: at the beginning of the Blue Bird pas de deux she collapsed on stage and had to be carried off by Guerard.

The British ballet writer Kathrine Sorley Walker, in her history of de Basil's Ballets Russes, reported that by the end of the Melbourne season an "extraordinary" relationship had built up between dancers and public resulting in "an emotional last night's performance", followed by endless curtain calls and a "flower-strewn" stage. Despite that, the promoters, J. C. Williamson, were unhappy with the takings; in Melbourne they were more than quarter down on what could have been achieved if there had been full houses. They were also annoyed with what they considered to be low quality lighting and decor and the feeling that they had been fobbed off by de Basil with a "second" company.

=== Sydney ===
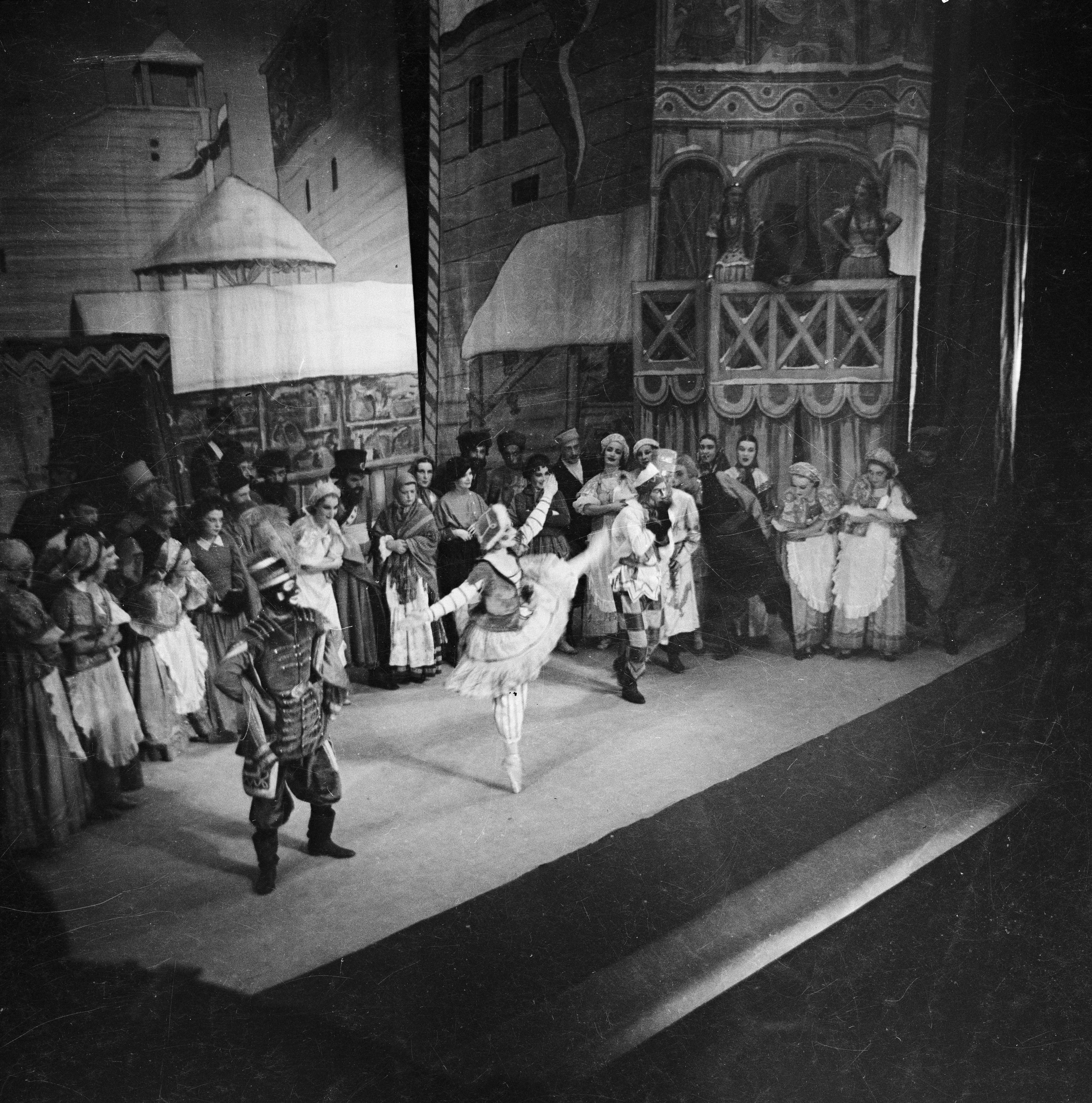
Hélène Kirsova stars in Petrushka at the Theatre Royal, Sydney, 11 January 1937

The company moved on from Melbourne to Sydney, New South Wales for a two-month season. They reached Sydney at 9am on Christmas Eve to prepare for opening at the 1,400-seat Theatre Royal on 26 December.

Problems were encountered with the orchestra yet again, this one being "comically weak in the brass". Nevertheless, as before, Kirsova and the other dancers rose above it and scored a notable opening night success. The Sydney Morning Herald wrote that "in Hélène Kirsova there is a Dancer of extraordinary merit". Sorley Walker has recorded that "Kirsova was emerging as the ballet-goers' choice of a company star. She was working hard, stimulated by appreciation, and her performances as the Street Dancer, as the Widow in L'Amour sorcier and L'Oiseau bleu (The Blue Bird) pas de deux made her a firm favourite".

"Triumphantly", on 23 January, Kirsova danced L'Oiseau de Feu. "She was considered unforgettable and 'absolutely stunning' " writes Sorley Walker. Thomas Armour, a dancer in the company, wrote: "She was only half human and with her fine elevation she never seemed to belong to the earth." Other tributes to Kirsova flowed. One critic wrote: "Kirsova never looks lovelier". Haskell declared that in this Australasian tour, which he followed as de Basil's liaison officer in the impresario's absence, "Kirsova, ever an exquisite craftsman, made a success of every role she undertook, and worked with exceptional intelligence and an eye for detail that I have rarely seen equalled".

=== New Zealand ===
The Sydney season ended on 26 February 1937 after more than 3,000 people were turned away from the doors during the last week. The company left the next day on the Huddart Parker line Wanganella for a turbulent crossing of the Tasman Sea to New Zealand and an opening at His Majesty's Theatre in Auckland. The journey was scheduled to take three and a half days, but rough seas delayed the arrival in Auckland until the day of the opening there, 3 March. As a result, the packed house at the theatre endured a much-delayed start to the evening, but "Dressed and gowned for the occasion as it had not been for many years", enthused the Auckland Star, "it was, indeed, a brilliant house, which bubbled into early enthusiasm that intensified with the successive performances".

The company filled the theatre every night and every matinée of the Auckland season, with the critics acclaiming Kirsova's "high favour" in the city.

Following the closing night in Auckland the company set off by special train on a week-long provincial tour of mostly one-night stands, performing at the Theatre Royal in Hamilton, the New Plymouth Opera House, the Opera House at Whanganui, the Palmerston North Opera House, the Municipal Theatre at Hastings and the Regent Theatre in Masterton. All the provincial dates sold out.

Sixteen performances at the Grand Opera House in Wellington followed, and then twelve at the Theatre Royal in Christchurch. A couple of one-night appearances followed, at the Theatre Royal in Timaru and the Grand Opera House in Oamaru. Exhausted, and suffering a multitude of minor injuries, the company closed their triumphant New Zealand tour with ten performances at His Majesty's Theatre in Dunedin. The last night in the country was on 1 May 1937. During the New Zealand tour, Kirsova had enjoyed some privileges not available to most other members of the troupe, who were travelling by train. At the end of March she wrote in a letter that the tour was "very successful, especially for me, as I have been touring by Sportscar (Riley 'Imp')"

Kirsova had attracted the enthralled attention of the press and the public throughout the tour of New Zealand, though not at the expense of the company's other prima ballerina, Valentina Blinova, who was regarded by the press and advertisers – though not necessarily by the public – as the bigger star. Typical of the never less than favourable reviews received by Kirsova was that in the Otago Daily Times enthusing about her contribution in Dunedin: "Mlle Kirsova's Columbine was a delight. What exquisite coquetry is hers! She radiates charm and is fortunate enough to be able to add to it genuine artistry – a facility of movement, a grace of gesture, and a technique which provide all the hallmarks of the truly great artist."

New Zealand ballet lovers were ecstatic about the whole tour. "Audiences have to go back ten years to the witchery of Pavlova, and further back than that to the porcelain beauty of the adorable Genée to find a parallel to the present season", wrote one theatre columnist.

Kirsova left Dunedin by express boat on 3 May, bound for Sydney, leaving the rest of the company to follow on the Union Steam Ship Company SS Awatea. Arriving in Sydney, she was welcomed by reporters and caused some controversy by saying that New Zealanders were "comfortable, but so dull". She later claimed that she had been misquoted and clarified that she found parts of the New Zealand countryside "dull", rather than New Zealanders.

=== Brisbane, Sydney, Melbourne and Adelaide ===
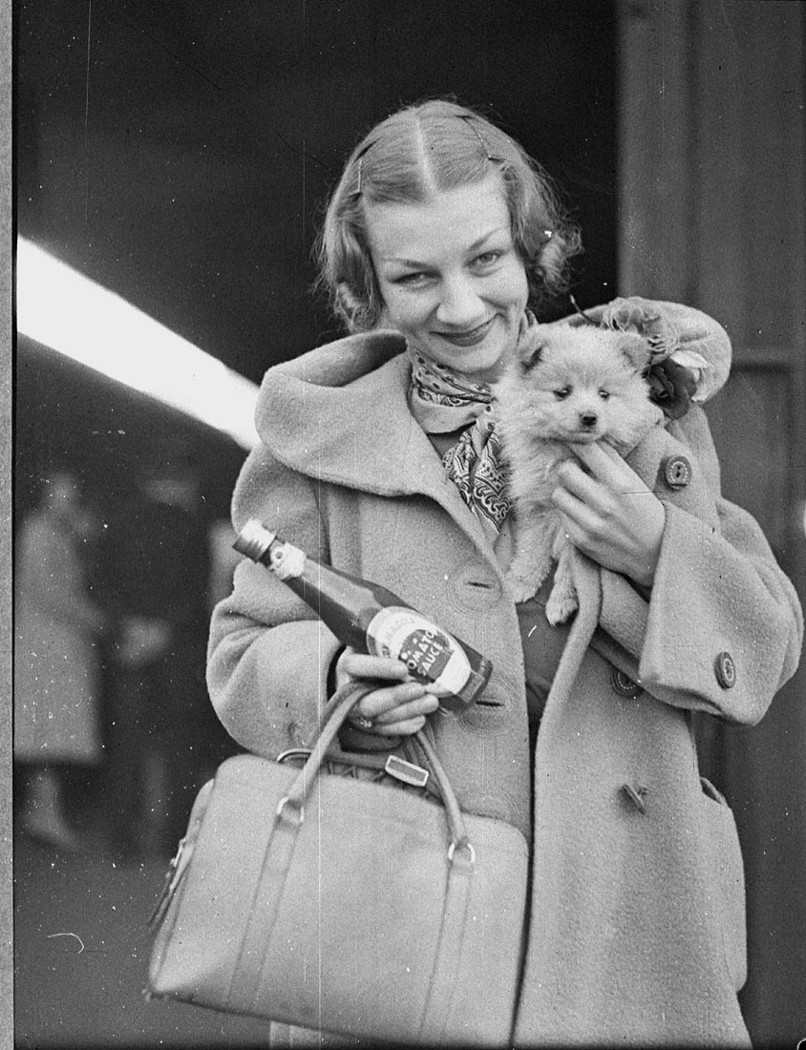
Hélène Kirsova (with presents of a puppy and tomato sauce) arriving back in Sydney, May 1937

On 7 May, the Ballets Russes company, including Kirsova, left Sydney on their special train to Brisbane, Queensland and His Majesty's Theatre where they opened on 8 May. In contrast to other Australian cities and the New Zealand tour, the 22 performances in Brisbane were not so successful. Audience reaction was cool.

The company returned from Brisbane to open another well-received short season of 22 performances in Sydney on 29 May. Melbourne was even more enthusiastic to see them again when they moved on there for a return season on 19 June. One newspaper compared Her Majesty's Theatre there to "an arena bedecked and reflagged to celebrate a famous victory". Kirsova gave her Fire Bird again on 23 June. Haskell, who had seen her performance of this on an earlier date in the tour, described her dancing of the exacting role of the "shy, brilliant bird" as "one of the most perfect things seen in this or any other season".

It was in Melbourne in June 1937 that Kirsova, always interested in modern art, met some of Australia's leading contemporary artists, several of whom she was later to commission when running her own ballet company in the 1940s. Café Petrushka in Little Collins Street was a meeting place for artists, musicians and writers. Kirsova and a number of her fellow dancers congregated regularly there mixing with artists of the stature of Loudon Sainthill and Sydney Nolan.

With the company worn out from a 10-month Australasian tour which had been planned to last only four months, Adelaide was a farewell stop for the company, with 9 performances from 7–14 July 1937. During the tour, Australians and New Zealanders had fallen in love with ballet wholeheartedly and they had filled nearly every theatre for every performance. But the true dazzling success of the tour had been Hélène Kirsova. Adeline Genée, Anna Pavlova and Olga Spessivtseva had previously toured Australia but they were mature; Kirsova was the first young ballerina to make an impact. In his essay on the interpreters of the Ballets Russes, Lee Christofis described the "elegance, dramatic qualities and wit" that she brought to the stage, which "quickly made her the public's favourite ballerina". Michelle Potter has written that Kirsova's dancing was received with much acclaim and that "critics consistently used words like 'dazzling', 'sparkling', and bewitching'" and that "she was commended for her 'grace and charm' and her 'rare, imaginative powers'." Towards the end of the company's long tour, a Melbourne newspaper declared her dancing to be "one of the most perfect things seen in this or any other season. The dramatic sense of this versatile ballerina is so convincing that her rare technical accomplishments are scarcely noticed". Audiences acclaimed every appearance she made on the stages of Australia and New Zealand in 1936 and 1937 above and beyond every other dancer in the company.

== Marriage and a temporary retirement ==
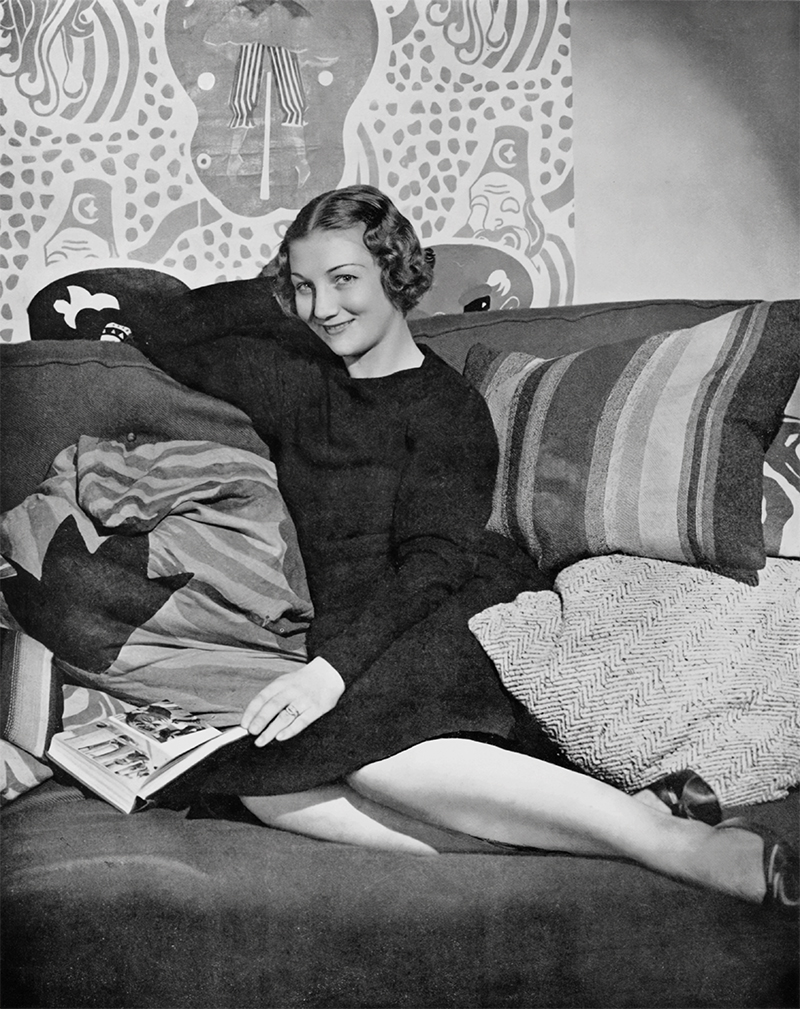
Madame Erik Fischer (Hélène Kirsova) The Home magazine August 1938. Photo: Noel Rubie

The company left Australia on 15 July 1937 on the P&O liner RMS Strathnaver to return to Europe. The dancers had been alerted that René Blum was intending to set up another ballet company with Leonide Massine and that Kirsova had been asked to join them as prima ballerina. Kirsova was with the rest of the company on the boat, but it was an "open secret" in the company that it was possible she would be returning to Australia to marry. When she reached Paris, both Blum and de Basil offered her new contracts. She declined both.

She visited London for a short time, having suits and dresses made, followed by two months with her parents and relatives in Copenhagen. She then announced that in February 1938 she was to marry the Danish Vice-Consul in Australia and would retire from dancing. Kirsova had met Dr Erick Fischer at a party given by the Danish Consul-General in Sydney at Christmas 1936.

She returned to Australia on the Strathnaver, arriving in Sydney on 19 January 1938. She told reporters that as she was about to get married she had definitely retired from dancing "for ever". "You cannot do two things and do them well," she remarked.

She married Fischer at the Anglican St Mark's Church, Darling Point, Sydney on 10 February 1938, wearing a mauve chiffon afternoondress designed for her by Georgette Renal of Paris. The bride was given away by Thomas Herbert "Bertie" Kelly, who was chairman of Perpetual Trustees, a director of the brewers Tooth and Co. and of the Bank of New South Wales, and the reception was held at the Kelly's Darling Point home. Among the guests was the newspaper publisher Sir Warwick Oswald Fairfax, who later became a sizeable investor in Kirsova's ballet company a few years later. The bride and groom spent their honeymoon at the Moombara home of Arthur Allen, head of the law firm Allen, Allen and Hemsley, on the Port Hacking Estuary. Kirsova was now moving in influential and moneyed circles.

The couple settled into a small, Spanish-type house at Clifton Gardens, a luxury suburb on the northern shores of Sydney Harbour. "It was a beautiful house and situation" wrote one of her later dance colleagues. "The land, which was natural bush, went down to the water of the harbour." The furniture and furnishings, some period, some modern, were all brought from Denmark. A son, Ole (named after Ole Lukøje in Hans Christian Andersen's fairy tale) was born to the couple in February 1939.

Kirsova lived in some domestic ease with a cook, and a nanny for Ole, and she drove "a big red, eight-cylindered sports car". She was now part of the diplomatic and social set of Sydney, her social life being regularly reported and photographed for the women's magazines and the women's pages of the newspapers. She stated that with Fischer "I have met everyone and gone everywhere". While journalists referred to her as Mrs Erik Fischer, they always reminded their readers that she was also the famous ballerina Hélène Kirsova and that she enjoyed going to the ballet and visiting her ballet friends when they visited Australia. Her retirement seemed satisfying and complete.

On 9 April 1940, however, the Nazis invaded neutral Denmark. Fischer, at that time serving as Acting Danish Consul-General in Australia, found his official status to be uncertain, with no instructions being received from Copenhagen. He and Kirsova, as Danish citizens, were relieved by an Australian government announcement that Danes in Australia would be regarded as "nationals of a friendly country".

== The Hélène Kirsova School of Russian Ballet Tradition ==
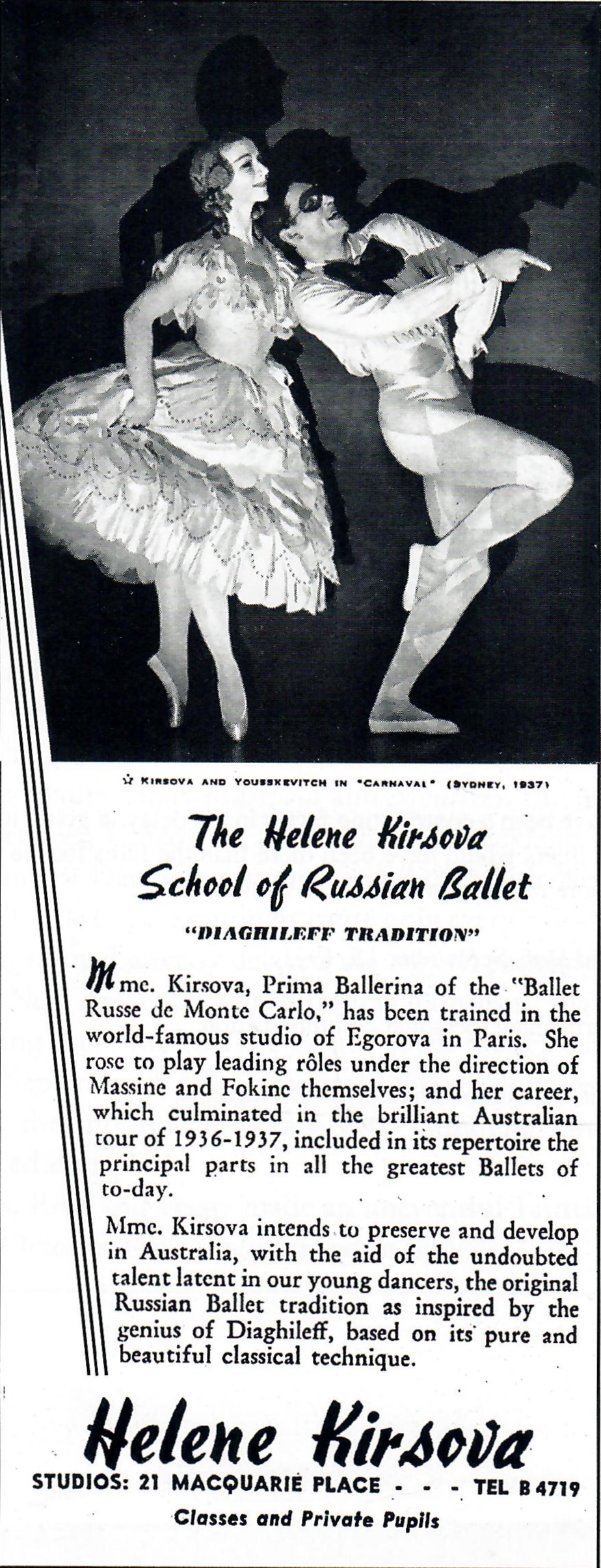
An advertising flyer for the Hélène Kirsova School of Russian Ballet

Kirsova emerged from her two and a half years retirement on 29 July 1940 when she opened the Hélène Kirsova School of Russian Ballet in the Diaghileff Tradition. "I feel I have been resting from the ballet long enough", she told a journalist, "and in establishing my school for ballet I hope to be able to build up a permanent company to give performances in the best ballet tradition." This was the first inkling that there would be a Kirsova ballet company. Other commentators picked up on her comments. One, interviewing Kirsova a few days after the opening of the school, reported that "Kirsova is convinced that in the not too distant future Australia will have its own ballet dancers, choreographers, decor designers, in fact an Australian ballet company." He continued: "For this she will work ...There is none other better prepared ... to be the founder of an Australian ballet tradition of our own."

The school was in an eight-storey building at 21 Macquarie Place near Circular Quay on the southern shores of Sydney Harbour in the vast premises formerly occupied by the Italian Club, most of whose members had been interned at the beginning of World War II, and which had been closed by government order. (The building now forms part of the Marriott Hotel.) The studio was "palatial", elegant, and well-equipped, "fitted with mirrors, showers, dressing rooms, and ceiling-to-floor white curtains which were hand-painted ... with images of dancers". Kirsova placed large and prominent advertisements for her school amongst the classified entertainment ads in the newspapers, saying she would welcome "Children, Advanced Pupils, and Professionals" and would run general classes and teach private pupils.

Kirsova's name and reputation in Australia was such that she attracted many pupils, including some who had been training elsewhere to a professional standard and were eager to take advantage of her teaching. With her experience in the world of ballet she brought to younger generations of Australian dancers the traditions of Russian ballet and the great European teachers: Staats, Egorova, Legat, Preobrajenska, Fokine, Massine, Balanchine and Nijinska.

She was a strict disciplinarian and the classes were mentally and physically challenging. Michelle Potter has written that Kirsova's pupils described her classes as "technically demanding with a great emphasis on turns, beats and jumps". In an interview with Potter, the New Zealand-born dancer Peggy Sager remembered: "She gave tremendous classes because she had a background from Egorova and Preobrajenska ... a tremendous amount of her class was on speed, footwork and brain." One writer has reported that she would give her dancers a long, complex enchainment: "When they were nearing the end, she would say 'Reverse it'. They would have to turn around and do it in reverse. Not only was this physically demanding, it was mentally so. This training gave the dancers the skills to quickly learn new choreography."

One writer has observed that she was "not the most communicative or approachable of people" and that "she was frequently rude, cutting and invariably unfriendly to her lesser talents, many of whom disliked her intensely ... But to her favourites ... and Kirsova was a woman who played favourites openly ... she was always warm and loving". It was also said that she concentrated on her soloists at the expense of the ensemble. Tamara Tchinarova, in a 1991 interview, described Kirsova as "perhaps more restrained [than Borovansky], but very dry, almost to the point of indifference". Another of her students, Paul Clementin, later Paul Hammond, remembered her "cold, icy criticism" and her demands for complete discipline. Valerie Lawson has reported that "many of the students, young and nervous newcomers, were pushed to the limit".

Within a year of Kirsova starting her school, in the Australian winter of 1941, she decided she had enough talent within the ranks of her pupils and available from elsewhere in Australia to start a professional ballet company.

== Kirsova Ballet ==
The Second World War had been wearing on for two years, and though the Ballets Russes had been able to visit Australia in 1939/40, no further visits from foreign ballet companies were possible until the oceans they had to cross were safer. Without foreign competition the way was clear for Australian companies to be set up with new Australian talent and for Australia's thirst for ballet to be satisfied. There had been occasional ballet recitals, but never before a full-scale professional Australian company.

The problems to be faced in setting up a professional company in the early years of the Second World War were many. One of Kirsova's associates (and later her second husband), Peter Bellew, the editor of the magazine, Art in Australia, and Secretary of the Contemporary Art Society of Australia in New South Wales, wrote about the obstacles that were faced. "The half-dozen legitimate theatres existing in the Commonwealth [of Australia] are placed in capital cities from 600 to 700 miles apart. Electricians, stage hands and other essential technicians are almost unprocurable. In 1940 properly trained and experienced dancers were even rarer – a strange condition in a country which boasted numerous dancing 'academies' in every city and large town." Male dancers of any experience were difficult to come by because most had been called up for the services and there was a constant threat of those already in the company being enlisted. Also, movement around the country was strictly controlled and trains had no space to transport stage scenery when military personnel and supplies took precedence.

Kirsova also had to face the scathing views of the major theatre owner J. C. Williamson, run by the Tait family. "The creation of a full sized Russian Ballet Company upon a proper professional and commercial basis," Bellew wrote, "was considered impossible by theatrical entrepreneurs who gave three main reasons – lack of public, lack of properly trained dancers and lack of theatres." Kirsova could do nothing about the lack of theatres, but she knew the public was ready and eager for ballet and that she could provide the properly trained dancers. Supported financially by Sir Warwick Fairfax and others, she was ready.

=== Dancers ===
The troupe Kirsova formed, initially with 25 members, was dominated at first by former de Basil Ballets Russes dancers who had stayed on in Australia after the Ballets Russes tour of 1938–39, wary of returning to Europe with war imminent, among them Tamara Tchinarova, Raissa Koussnetsova, Valeri Shaievsky, and Edouard Sobichevsky. Former de Basil dancers Serge Bousloff and Valentin Zeglovsky joined subsequently.

Kirsova also promoted a number of Australian soloists from her school. Prominent among them were Rachel Cameron, "a dancer of rare musical sensitivity and intelligence" who had been expelled from Edouard Borovansky's school in Melbourne; Strelsa Heckelman, the "baby" of the company who came to Kirsova on the advice of de Basil when she was only 14; Helene ffrance, who arrived at the studio in 1942 as "an awkward novice" but blossomed rapidly into a soloist "with unusual grace and purity of line"; June Newstead, an arresting stage personality; Nicholas Ivangine, who joined in 1943 but was already ailing and died very young of Hodgkin's disease; Henry Legerton, who had trained for a year in England and whose appearances with Kirsova were limited by his duties with the Australian Army; and, later, Paul Hammond (then working under the name Clementin) a dancer of exceptional elevation and a master of "some quite startling technical tricks". She also took on Peggy Sager from New Zealand who was deemed "perfect in every possible technical feat". These young dancers were unknowns, but within a few years, under Kirsova's training and influence – and once the older Ballets Russes dancers had dropped away – they were to be amongst the pioneers of a genuine Australian ballet tradition.

The corps de ballet consisted mainly of Australian dancers who had been studying at Kirsova's school and included John Seymour, Victoria Forth, Helen Black, Trafford Whitelock, Jean Shearer, Bettina Brown, Marie Malloy, Joy Palmer and Peggy Chauncey.

Joan Gadsdon joined the company later, as did Thadée Slavinsky in 1942, Mischa Burlakof and Valentin Zeglovsky.

Kirsova's choreography was perceived as "minimalist", influenced by modern art, and "original and innovative". She encouraged her dancers to study contemporary art, bringing books from her home for them to borrow. She claimed that "if they understood modern art, they could understand what she was aiming for with her choreography". When Kirsova was choreographing her ballet Harlequin she told Paul Hammond to study Pablo Picasso's Pink and Blue period paintings so he could understand what she was after. She had "a policy of originality" and "proved to be a sensitive creative artist and... had the power to inspire". Michael Salter has reported that Kirsova choreographed specifically for her dancers, "exploiting what abilities they had ... She extended their techniques by making demands on them which in the beginning seemed impossible, but which, by virtue of her talent at recognising a dancer's potential, emerged as choreography that was exciting to watch".

Kirsova paid all her dancers theatrical award salaries, the lowest salary paid to any performer being £5.2s.0d. a week, more than that paid to many dancers in overseas companies who had toured Australia. She also paid all her dancers' Actors Equity of Australia union fees herself, which registered them as professional performers and ensured that her troupe was the first theatrical company in the country to be composed entirely of Equity members and the first professional ballet company in Australia.

She could not pay the dancers for rehearsals and they still had to pay for their classes, so Kirsova paid them an advance of £2 a week while they were rehearsing and £3.2s.0d. a week when performing. Because the dancers all had day jobs when not performing, all rehearsals were held in the evenings and at weekends. After a few years Kirsova paid Rachel Cameron, Strelsa Heckelman, and Peggy Sager to teach the junior pupils at the school.

=== Backers and supporters ===
Kirsova had the means to pay her dancers and run her company professionally because, as one student of Australian dance has noted: "As the wife of the Danish Vice-Consul, [Kirsova] maintained a strong social position, thus attracting private backing, which left her free to indulge in artistic experimentation without undue concern ... Kirsova was hard-working and talented, facing a difficult barrier because of her gender, but her ballet company was almost a hobby, focussing on her performances and choreography."

She had two particular patrons who gave the Kirsova Ballet much needed financial backing: the impresario Edward Tait, who with his family controlled the J C Williamson theatres, and her major benefactor Warwick Fairfax, who controlled many newspapers and publications, including the Sydney Morning Herald, adored de Basil's Ballets Russes and was "entranced" by Kirsova. She also had influential support from Fairfax's friend Peter Bellew, "a respected art critic of the Sydney Morning Herald and passionate defender of the contemporary arts". Bellew became the manager of the Kirsova Ballet.

=== Designers and composers ===
As well as wanting young Australian dancers to form her company, Kirsova (an enthusiastic collector of modern art) also wanted young Australian practitioners of the visual arts to be involved as well. The author John Hood has written that Kirsova "considered ballet should be a balanced combination of décor, music and dancing." She welcomed visual artists to visit the studio and "it became a meeting place where they shared their ideas, stimulating their creativity." Artists frequently visiting the studio were Sali Herman, Arthur Boyd, William Dobell, Loudon Sainthill, Wolfgang Cardamatis, and Amy Kingston. She asked the more talented of the visiting artists to design scenery and costumes.

Kirsova commissioned Loudon Sainthill, then still in his early twenties, and who she had met in Melbourne in 1937, to design the costumes and decor for her productions of Faust, A Dream – and a Fairytale and Vieux Paris. Amie Kingston handled the settings and costumes for later Kirsova ballets Hansel and Gretel and Harlequin, while Alice Danciger won plaudits for her costumes for Capriccio and the decor for Jeunesse. Wolfgang Cardamatis and Wallace Thornton adapted their successful two-dimensional painting techniques to the three-dimensional requirements of the stage, Cardamatis being responsible for the huge sets for Kirsova's Revolution of the Umbrellas, assisted by Jean Bellette and Paul Haefliger.

As well as enthusing over modern art Kirsova also loved contemporary music and encouraged musicians and composers like Charles Mackerras, Frank Hutchens, Lindley Evans and the young pianist Henry Krips to visit the studio. Krips (an Austrian refugee from the Nazis who had made Australia his home since 1938) wrote the music for both of Kirsova's three-act ballets, Faust and Revolution of the Umbrellas. Krips also served as Kirsova's music director, being resident composer and music arranger. Rather than use theatre orchestras, which she distrusted, Kirsova also employed a pool of talented pianists to provide the music for her ballets, usually on two grand pianos, including Krips, Marcel Lorber (another refugee from the Nazis), Richard Spirk, the young New Zealand prodigy Richard Farrell, and occasionally the teenage Charles Mackerras.

=== First performances ===
The Kirsova Ballet (though still publicly unnamed at this point) gave its first performance on 8 July 1941 at the New South Wales Conservatorium of Music, an auditorium with a small stage and poor facilities for stage lighting, at the start of a short Red Cross charity ballet season which raised more than £950. The company danced three ballets: a restaging of Léonide Massine's Les Matelots about sailors and their girlfriends, and two new works choreographed by Kirsova, A Dream – and a Fairy Tale, her first choreographic work, with music by Frédéric Chopin, and based on a Danish fairytale about dolls who come to life, and Vieux Paris, set in the 1890s with music by Jacques Offenbach and Richard Strauss.

Another charity season for the Red Cross was held shortly afterwards with performances of A Dream – and a Fairy Tale, Les Matelots, and Vieux Paris. This was followed by a third charity event from the 4–6 October 1941: three days in an elegant home in the Blue Mountains to the west of Sydney, where the troupe gave Les Sylphides and Vieux Paris.

=== Minerva Theatre, Sydney ===
The first major appearance by the then newly named Kirsova Ballet, now enlarged to about 40 artists, was a six-week season at the Minerva Theatre in Sydney, opening on 22 November 1941. The newspapers reported that "tumultuous applause" arose at the final curtain of the first gala performance. The ballet critic of the Sydney Morning Herald welcomed the performances: "The dancing was so clean and smooth that it was difficult to believe that the young Australians dancing were not artists with years of experience behind them". This criticism was somewhat biased because it was written by Kirsova's major investor, Warwick Fairfax, writing in his own newspaper. Critics were also enthusiastic about the presentation, settings, costumes, and choreography. One declared they were "comparable with programmes we have seen presented by visiting European companies".

During this season at the Minerva a three-act Faust, in which the devil was female and called Mephistophela, choreographed by Kirsova to Henry Krips' music, appeared in the programme. It was a major production with more than an hour of dancing. Critics described it as "brilliant" and "colourful" and it was reported that Kirsova had received so many requests from audiences for it to continue to be seen that it was retained in the programme for the final week. It ran for 25 consecutive performances, establishing a world record for an individual ballet. Other ballets seen in the season included A Dream – and a Fairy Tale, Les Matelots, and Vieux Paris. The season was a big success, with full houses throughout. Kirsova hoped that the Minerva would become the "home" of her company for many seasons to come, but she fell out with the company managing the theatre.

She also fell out with the Musicians' Union which was angered that she was using two pianists of Austrian origin – "enemy aliens" – rather than Australian musicians. Kirsova, as ever, was resolute in her refusal to use "amateurish" orchestras.

=== A permanent Australian ballet company? ===
Even before the company's first performance, Kirsova was hinting that her troupe might become the kernel of a permanent Australian ballet company. In the programme for her first season, she wrote: "It seems anomalous that Australia, which, through the visits of Adelina Genée, Pavlova, Spessiva, the Ballets Russes de Monte-Carlo, and Colonel de Basil's two most recent companies, has proved itself to be the most truly ballet-conscious country in the world today, has never had its own permanent company."

At the close of the Minerva season on 2 January 1942, Kirsova returned to her idea that she would like to form a permanent Australian ballet company. "Our season at the Minerva has proved that the Sydney public is willing to support a permanent ballet," she said. "If the encouragement in the other States proves as great as here we will be able to look forward to regular seasons in all capital cities and other important centres". She was even more optimistic in an interview with Melbourne's The Argus newspaper in January 1942, stating: "With foreign companies unable to encroach on this field, it is Australia's moment to prove that a regular ballet can be maintained here. We are trying to do it at the most difficult time, and under difficult conditions, but I am confident that we can succeed, and if we can succeed now, then I am sure that after the war a great future lies before us, and I want to see an all-Australian company travelling abroad to compete with companies of other nationalities."

She was to return to this ambition on numerous occasions over the following years, developing the idea further even after the Kirsova Ballet had fallen out of contention, but she was never to see its realisation. She died a few months before the official 1962 formation of The Australian Ballet.

=== Melbourne ===
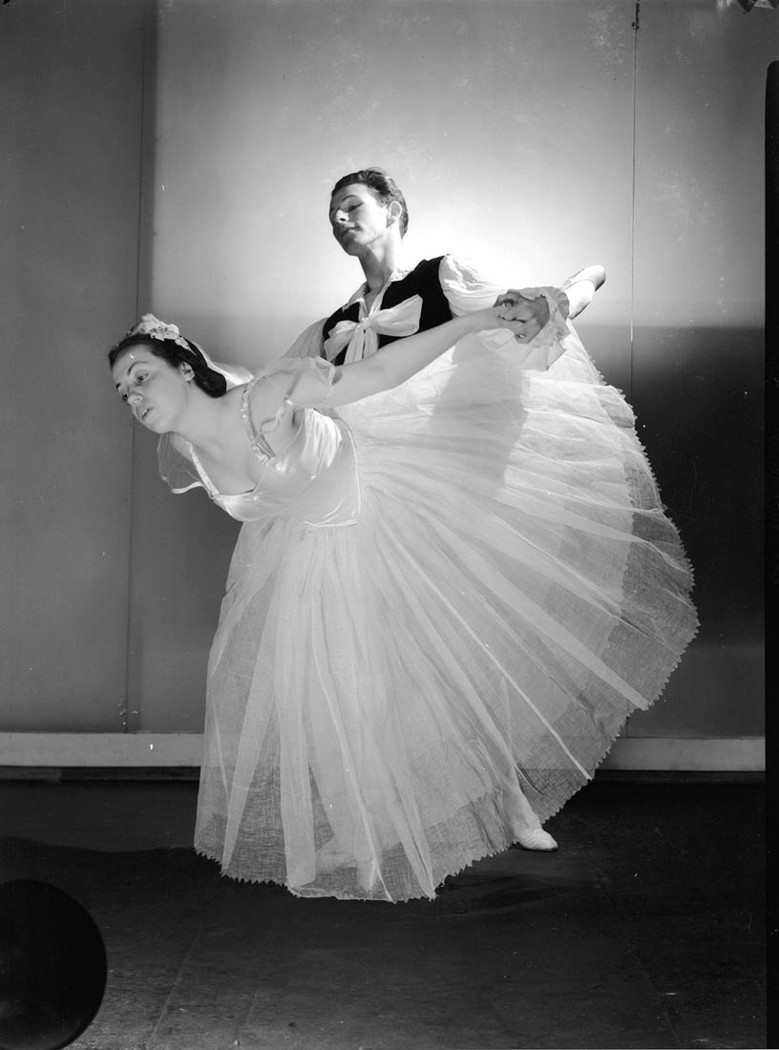
Rachel Cameron and Henry Legerton dance in the Kirsova Les Sylphides. (Photographer Max Dupain)

The first trial to see if the company would be accepted in other States came quickly with a season booked to open at His Majesty's Theatre in Melbourne on 31 January 1942. The young dancers arrived by train from Sydney on 29 January, excited to be on tour for the first time and to be dancing on a larger stage than any previously at their disposal. Kirsova refused to use the J. C. Williamson orchestra, which she considered, as always, to be second-rate. It was the same one that had caused problems for the Ballets Russes dancers at His Majesty's Theatre in October 1936. The band had to be paid because of Kirsova's rental arrangements with J. C. Williamson, so she paid them but once again used her own pianists.

The Melbourne season's programme included four Kirsova-created ballets: A Dream – and a Fairy Tale, Faust, Vieux Paris, and Les Matelots. Les Sylphides also made an appearance, together with L'Oiseau Bleu (The Blue Bird) and Manuel de Falla's Ritual Fire Dance. When the season opened there were packed audiences with people queuing from 6am every day to buy tickets. The season broke war-time audience records.

However, there was disagreement in Melbourne when three of Kirsova's leading dancers, Kouznetsova, Shaievsky and Sobichevsky, announced five minutes before the curtain went up before a packed audience that they would refuse to perform unless their wages were quadrupled and their names billed before Kirsova's. The curtain-up was delayed for an hour, but eventually Kirsova had to give in to their demands for more money. Kouznetsova and Shaievsky left at the end of the Melbourne run to reconvene their Polish-Australian Ballet. Tchinarova also left, fearing that another sizeable season was unlikely in the near future.

=== A pause in Sydney ===
Building on her successes at the Minerva in Sydney and His Majesty's in Melbourne, Kirsova was able to stage a short season at the New South Wales Conservatorium of Music from 25 April to 2 May 1942. The company gave the ever-popular Les Sylphides and brought back the three-act Faust.

At this point, at the same time as losing three of her principal former Ballets Russes dancers, most of Kirsova's remaining male dancers were conscripted into the services or war industries. In particular, her promising male dancer Henry Legerton, for whom Kirsova had predicted a spectacular career, was called up and within weeks was serving in New Guinea. Edouard Sobishevsky was also conscripted but was later able to secure exemption. Kirsova's music director and composer, Henry Krips, was also called up. Kirsova did not have enough dancers and other creatives and crew left to continue regular performances. Those she still had were forced to go back to working at their various jobs. Rachel Cameron, for instance, worked in a bookshop in Sydney when not dancing, while Peggy Sager served in a milk bar. All the dancers continued to take classes and rehearsed in their free time.

Kirsova's personal life suffered some stress at this point as well, when her husband, the Danish Vice-Consul, together with the Consul-General, were dismissed by the Danish government, operating under the influence of the occupying German forces, when the Consuls refused to sever relations with the Danish legation in London.

Kirsova spent the next 12 months finding and training new dancers. It was at this point that the 19-year-old Paul Clementin joined the company as a principal and soloist. His real surname was Hammond, but Kirsova persuaded him to adapt his middle name of Clement for his stage surname. His talent was such that Kirsova began to choreograph many of her male parts for him.

=== Return to performance ===
By February 1943 the company was boosted enough to resume public performances. 1943 saw five seasons at the unsatisfactory Conservatorium, a hall described as having a "chill atmosphere", but all of the seasons played to packed houses.

The first, from 9–14 February, in aid of the Red Cross and the Legacy War Orphans Appeal, saw Les Sylphides once again, and the world premiere of Kirsova's new ballet Revolution of the Umbrellas, a story of social injustice and inequality, with music by Henry Krips. The Sydney Morning Herald welcomed the "mobility and drama, and some moments of memorable beauty" and praised the "singularly fine work" of dancers Rachel Cameron and Peggy Sager.

From 15 to 20 March the company was back with Revolution of the Umbrellas again, and the premiere of another Kirsova ballet, Hansel and Gretel with music by Engelbert Humperdinck. Again, the Red Cross and the War Orphans Appeal were the beneficiaries.

The company's return to the Conservatorium was from 20 to 24 July, now with 45 dancers. Francis Poulenc's Jeunesse was a world premiere, as was Capriccio to the music of Nikolai Rimsky-Korsakov, Kirsova once again choreographing. Faust made another appearance. The usual charities benefitted.

=== Kirsova dances again ===
A somewhat longer season from 18 to 28 September brought back Jeunesse, Capriccio, Hansel and Gretel and the classic Lac des Cygnes, and, to the delight of Sydney audiences, Hélène Kirsova herself was now dancing again, every night, for the first time since 1937. She told the newspapers that it had not been her intention to dance again because she wished to teach and develop young Australian ballerinas to enable them to dance all the roles. "The programme for the new season, however, is so exacting and will make such demands on the company", wrote one reporter, that Kirsova had decided "to ease the strain on the others by dancing a spectacular role, which has an important solo, in 'Capriccio'."

By the end of this season the Red Cross and the War Orphans had benefitted by £3,755 and funds were also being dedicated to a new charity, Kirsova's own, which was intent on establishing fully-equipped children's playgrounds in the deprived and congested area of Erskineville in Sydney. By September 1943 a proportion of profits went towards buying a block of land for the site of the first playground.

A 3-week Christmas and New Year season opened at the Conservatorium on 17 December, to run through to 8 January 1944. Yet again, attempts to provide a good orchestra proved impossible. Although the Australian Broadcasting Commission was willing to make its players available for the season, the players themselves did not agree. As a result, Kirsova resorted again to her two grand pianos rather than dance to a scratch orchestra, and consequently had to forgo three new ballets she had planned, all of which required an orchestra: Minotaure, which was to have been performed to Tchaikovsky's 4th Symphony, Waltzing Matilda, the music for which was composed by the young Sydney musician Charles Mackerras (the famous bush ballad tune being prominently positioned), and another ballet, not yet named, set to the César Franck Variations symphoniques.

There was, however, another premiere, Harlequin danced to the music of Maurice Ravel, and the appearance of other favourites: Les Sylphides, Hansel and Gretel, Capriccio, Lac des Cygnes and Vieux Paris. Kirsova danced in the premiere of Harlequin, in Capriccio and in the "spectacular waltz" in Vieux Paris. "This is the Kirsova of the palmy days of the Russian ballet", wrote the critic of the Sydney Morning Herald on Christmas Day, "accomplished, expressive, technically brilliant". Kirsova was not alone in the critic's praise: "conspicuously good performances from Thadée Slavinsky, Rachel Cameron, Strelsa Heckelman, and Trafford Whitelock ... there was increasing evidence of the improving technique of the Australian male dancer, Paul Clementin, who is showing greater confidence and proficiency with every performance ... Helen Ffrance, one of the most attractive 'natural' dancers Sydney has seen for a long time". Also coming in for praise were "the delicious Sainthill decor, the florid costumes and sumptuous ensembles".

The cover of this season's programme announced: "Proceeds from this season will be used to continue the work of establishing a series of fully equipped playgrounds throughout the congested areas of Sydney. The full proceeds from the September season, amounting to £1,678, were sufficient to provide two grounds at Erskineville, and these are now under construction. Proceeds from this season, it is hoped, will be sufficient to complete the requirements in Erskineville and also extend the scheme to another municipality lacking proper playing facilities."

=== Melbourne, Adelaide and Brisbane ===
The impresarios of the J. C. Williamson theatre group, who controlled most of the large theatres in Australia and were wanting to house a permanent ballet company on their circuit, had been watching Kirsova closely. Liking the packed houses and the early morning queues for tickets, and the widespread appreciation of the critics, J. C. Williamson offered Kirsova a tour of Melbourne, Adelaide and Brisbane, starting in January and ending in May 1944.

A problem arose at this point. In wartime Australia, the movement of people around the country, particularly between states, was strictly controlled. Permits for interstate travel were issued only for defence personnel and others involved in the war effort. Those employed in essential manufacturing were monitored closely. A complaint was lodged with the manpower authorities in New South Wales concerning the appearance of the Kirsova Ballet in Melbourne suggesting that if Kirsova and her dancers were doing essential war work permission should not be given for them to travel to Melbourne. It is thought the complaint may have come from Edouard Borovansky, who ran a ballet school in Melbourne, staged performances in the city and considered Melbourne to be "his" territory.

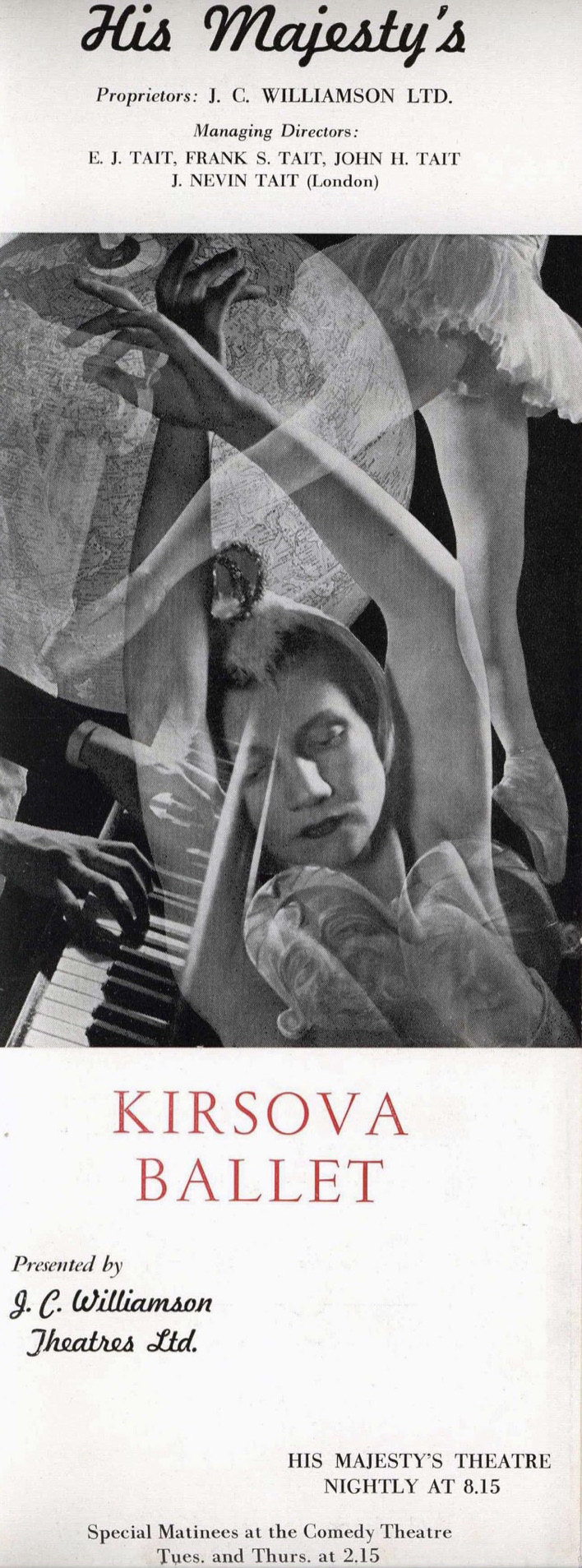
Advertising for the Kirsova Ballet in Melbourne, January 1944

However, J. C. Williamson confirmed that no member of the company was doing essential war work which they would have to leave to go to Melbourne and the manpower authorities stated that many of the dancers were outside the 21–35 age limit prescribed in the Manpower Act and that entertainment was necessary for troops on leave and to maintain public morale so they made no objection to the Melbourne season proceeding.

A few days after closing at the Conservatorium the company left for Melbourne to open at His Majesty's Theatre on 15 January 1944 for a three-week season. Special matinée performance were also staged at the smaller Comedy Theatre. The first season included Lac des Cygnes, Jeunesse, Harlequin, and Vieux Paris in which Melbourne audiences were able to see Kirsova dancing in their city for the first time in nearly seven years. The Argus newspaper reported that she received "a tremendous ovation". The second week added Hansel and Gretel, Harlequin, Les Sylphides, and Kirsova dancing once again in Revolution of the Umbrellas. In the third week Capriccio was added.

Three days after closing in Melbourne, the company opened in Adelaide at the Theatre Royal, presenting a three-week season of Les Sylphides, Hansel and Gretel, Harlequin, Vieux Paris, Revolution of the Umbrellas, Lac des Cygnes, Capriccio, and Jeunesse. As Adelaide had been the scene of Kirsova's greatest triumph in Australia in 1936 she made sure to add to the advertisements for the season the promise that "Madame Kirsova is dancing at all performances". The houses were packed and fans queued for two days to buy tickets.

There was then a long journey to Brisbane, where the Kirsova Ballet opened on 8 April at His Majesty's Theatre. The same ballets reappeared, to the huge enthusiasm of the Brisbane audience, with as usual every performance booked out. Brisbane was a popular location for American and Australian servicemen on leave, who helped to pack the house every night. Kirsova offered to take her company to New Guinea to entertain the Australian troops there if the Army would supply the means of getting there and back. The Army declined the offer. However, the company did perform at an Army convalescent hospital. Sergeant Henry Legerton was one of the soldiers on leave in Brisbane and joined the troupe for this performance.

The season, and the tour, ended on 6 May, with plans laid for a season in Sydney in September.

The success of the tour was palpable, the future of the company seemed assured, and the tour had seen Kirsova's young protégées, Rachel Cameron, Strelsa Heckelman, Peggy Sager and Paul Clementin, become world class performers. Cameron reported in an interview towards the end of her life, recalling her days with the Kirsova Ballet, that "Kirsova used to say that if she could take us to Europe we would cause a sensation."

Kirsova had proved that Australia could support its own indigenous ballet company, and that the talent was there for it to be world class, not just in dancers, but in composers, set and costume designers and librettists.

=== Kirsova versus Borovansky ===
The potential was great, but Kirsova had to rely on the J. C. Williamson company for her future tours. The company, run by the Tait family, knew that the time was right for them to take a permanent Australian ballet company under their wing. But the Taits considered Kirsova "unmanageable, totally individualistic" and were concerned that she insisted on performing new ballets, rather than the standard classics they felt the Australian public preferred.

The Taits knew that Kirsova's was not the only ballet company in the field. Edouard Borovansky, from his Melbourne base, had been building his own company in much same way as Kirsova: with a school and setting up his troupe with former Ballets Russes dancers and new young Australians whom he paid when they were performing. But he would be prepared to bow to the Tait's wishes and not attempt to present anything they might consider to be too "new".

The two companies were in competition and this was exacerbated by a split in J. C. Williamson's attitude to them: EJ Tait, who ran the Sydney branch of "The Firm", as it was widely known, favoured Kirsova. He was an enthusiastic ballet lover and considered himself one of Kirsova's greatest admirers. His brothers, John and Frank, who ran the Melbourne head office, preferred Borovansky. However, a choice was finally made and J. C. Williamson offered Kirsova their backing, wanting to make her a salaried producer-director. She and all her dancers would be on a regular salary, but she would have to present the popular ballets from the Ballets Russes rather than her own ballets, and she would have to use the resident theatre bands and J. C. Williamson's scenery and costumes.

Kirsova was not one to make compromises. Peter Bellew reported that her "almost fanatical idealism and uncompromising determination that aesthetic values must always come first are qualities which fit most uneasily into the commercial side of theatre – particularly Australian theatre". She wished to work through the Tait's theatres independently rather than be under their management, and particularly, given her past experience with them, had no desire to utilise their orchestras. She refused the offer as all she wanted was her independence and the use of the theatres.

The Taits instead turned to Borovansky, who was amenable to all the impresarios' demands, and the theatre owners formed a professional ballet company under his direction. As they could use only one ballet company, J. C. Williamson had no further use for Kirsova. Michelle Potter has also suggested that in considering the reasons for the demise of the Kirsova Ballet "the issue of gender-bias, conscious or unconscious, in the male-dominated world of theatrical management in Australia of the 1940s cannot be discounted."

As a result, Kirsova found herself at a disadvantage when trying to book theatres of any kind of scale in Sydney, Melbourne, Adelaide and Brisbane. She also felt that J. C. Williamson was trying to edge her out of contention. The planned Sydney season, due to open on 20 September at the Conservatorium, was postponed indefinitely, because – according to the Kirsova Ballet – the wartime Rationing Commission had refused them permission to buy costume materials. An angry statement by Kirsova's manager implied that this decision would deny Kirsova the opportunity to compete with Borovansky and said it would mean "the creation of a ballet monopoly in the hands of theatrical entrepreneurs who, until the field was pioneered by Madame Kirsova, made no attempt to create a ballet company."

A response the following day by the Rationing Commission, however, argued that the Kirsova Ballet had in fact been issued with material far in excess of that issued to any similar company or group in Australia.

It was possible that Kirsova's refusal to compromise was going to lead to the demise of her ballet company. She could not organise tours, and even single seasons would be difficult. As a result, she could not offer regular work to her dancers and so she gave them permission to join the Borovansky ballet, which was looking for dancers.

Among those who went were Strelsa Heckelman, Helen ffrance, Joan Gadsdon, Judy Burgess, and Joan and Monica Halliday, all of whom now had much experience. Others loyally stayed, including Peggy Sager, Paul Clementin, and Rachel Cameron, who had had a falling out with Borovansky some years previously.

=== Kirsova Ballet closes ===
With her depleted troupe, the Kirsova Ballet took part in a Gala on 5 September 1944 in Sydney in a stage show supporting the premiere in Australia of the film Phantom of the Opera. 1945 saw the Kirsova Ballet's last performance, given for the servicemen and staff at the Yaralla Military Hospital in Sydney. The company was received with delight, and the final ballet, Vieux Paris, was danced for a second time as an encore.

Kirsova continued to plan hopefully for a further season and lined up a two-week booking at Brisbane City Hall in October 1945, where a new set of ballets would be performed. Among them was to be Mackerras' Waltzing Matilda. Unfortunately for Kirsova – and Mackerras – at the last moment the booking there was cancelled by the city's authorities in favour of entertainment for servicemen.

As well as Waltzing Matilda Kirsova had a number of other ballets ready or in preparation at this point. Among them was Minotaure, Symphonic Variations with music by César Franck, Peter and the Wolf, to be danced to Sergei Prokofiev's music, another ballet based on the characters of the area of Kings Cross in Sydney to be danced to George Gershwin's An American in Paris. Designs for sets and costumes had already been provided for these future works.

When the Brisbane engagement was cancelled, Kirsova faced a bleak future for her company. She could not find suitable theatres in which to perform, many of her best dancers had left, and she no longer trusted her previously loyal patron, Edward Tait. Also, her marriage to Erick Fischer was over. She accepted the inevitable and closed the company. Peggy Sager and Paul Clementin (renaming himself Paul Hammond) joined the Borovansky company. Rachel Cameron, unwilling to do the same, remained with Kirsova for a time, teaching at the school. The Kirsova Ballet had lasted for just over four years from its first performance in July 1941.

== Retirement ==
Kirsova continued to operate her ballet school in Sydney, making a particular point of providing classes for male dancers as there had been a shortage when so many had been called up for the war. Now those who survived were being demobilised and Kirsova was anxious that the men who wanted to return to dancing should be able to do so. One important attender of her classes was Henry Legerton, back from army service and working enthusiastically to make up for lost time.

Kirsova continued to hope that one day she would be able to set up her ballet company again, and in pursuit of establishing a suitable theatre in Sydney not controlled by the J. C. Williamson organisation, in July 1946 she became involved in discussions about the future of Sydney's 2,000-seat Capitol Theatre, which was to be sold by the City Council. Kirsova had long maintained that it should be preserved and set up as a national theatre for drama, ballet and opera. She was opposed by both the city's politicians and executives of the Australian Broadcasting Commission and her attempts failed (though, many decades later, the theatre is now host to major musicals, ballet and opera).

The school continued to operate until it closed in January 1948, though Kirsova herself was not involved in its final stages as at the end of 1946 she returned to Denmark. She took a house just outside Copenhagen and lived there with her son Ole. On 16 October 1947 she obtained a divorce from Fischer.

On 3 April 1948, at the British Consulate in Paris, she married her long-term supporter and associate, Australian Peter Bellew. There was only one guest at the wedding ceremony: Wolfgang Cardamatis, one of Kirsova's former set designers. The Bellews honeymooned in Florence, Italy.

Kirsova had known Bellew for some time through their shared passion for modern art and he had edited Pioneering Ballet in Australia, a history of the Kirsova Ballet, published in 1945. Bellew had recently joined the Paris-based United Nations Educational, Scientific and Cultural Organisation (UNESCO) as a visual art expert in charge of the Arts and Letters Division and he and Kirsova and her son Ole set up home in an old house in the village of Saint-Prix outside Paris. They later moved to a sixth-floor Paris apartment in Rue Galilée near the Arc de Triomphe, a short walk from the UNESCO headquarters in Avenue Kléber.

The Bellews returned regularly to Australia, and in a visit in July 1949, speaking to the press, Kirsova stated that she "deplored the tendency, now prevalent in Europe, of gathering a corps de ballet around just one of two principal dancers and so forming numerous small companies, instead of building up strong companies with international reputations, such the famous Diaghilev and de Basil Ballets Russes groups".

In October 1951, Kirsova gave birth to a second son, who she and Bellew named Ib, a Danish diminutive of Jakob. Now known as Hélène Bellew, Kirsova moved into a life of relaxation, "always beautifully dressed in simple grey or black clothes (often from Dior)". She was a keen hostess, entertaining dancers, musicians and artists from Australia, and colleagues from her earlier days. She continued to collect contemporary art and became a keen photographer.

In January 1952 at a stopover at Sydney Airport on her way to visit Peter Bellew's parents in Melbourne, she told reporters of her intention to reopen the Kirsova Ballet. But seeing the Borovansky Ballet was in the midst of a record-breaking tour of Australasia and theatre ownership was still being monopolised by J. C. Williamson, she abandoned her ideas for a comeback.

In 1956 after visiting Moscow and Leningrad (Saint Petersburg), she published Ballet in Moscow Today, a record of the complete repertoire of the Bolshoi Ballet. Since the Russian Revolution of 1917 the West knew little of what had been happening in Russian ballet. She analysed and appraised the Russian dancers' technique, after attending rehearsals and performances and talking with all the leading dancers, choreographers and administrators. "One of the greatest experiences of my life," she said of her visit. She also contributed to A Dictionary of Modern Ballet in 1959.

Kirsova died early and suddenly. On a regular trip to London in 1962 with her husband, she was taken seriously ill. An emergency operation was performed at Guy's Hospital, but she died there of cancer on 22 February 1962, at the age of 51. She was cremated.

== Legacy ==
Hélène Kirsova's outstanding legacy was her short-lived but highly regarded Kirsova Ballet, the first professional indigenous ballet company in Australia, which amid the deprivations of the Second World War was one of the foundation stones of Australian Ballet.

She was one of the crucial links between the Diaghilev dancers of the early twentieth century and those who dance today. Michelle Potter has written that the fact that hers was the first professional company in Australia "should be enough to ensure Kirsova a permanent place in dance history". Kirsova discovered and encouraged into successful and long-standing careers in international ballet a number of Australasian dancers. Among them were Rachel Cameron, Strelsa Heckelman, Paul Hammond, Peggy Sager, and Henry Legerton.

Potter has also observed that Kirsova made another "enduring and significant contribution to ballet in Australia: being a pioneering patron of theatre design by Australian artists."

Michael Salter in his biography of Edouard Borovansky concluded: "If Boro (Borovansky) is to be assessed as the father of Australian ballet, Kirsova is, at least, its godmother, and she bestowed a splendid gift at its christening."

The success of Kirsova's company was due in large part to her famously well-regarded tour of Australia with the Ballets Russes in the late 1930s. Arnold Haskell stated that "It was Miss Kirsova's personal success in Australia which planted the first real seed of ballet in that country and made the rest much easier for those who followed her."

Kirsova left eight new ballets which she choreographed for the Kirsova Ballet company. In July 1941 A Dream – and a Fairy Tale and Vieux Paris were both premiered at the New South Wales Conservatorium in Sydney. November 1941 saw the premiere of Faust at the Minerva Theatre, Sydney. Five new ballets appeared in 1943, all premiered at the Conservatorium: Revolution of the Umbrellas in February, Hansel and Gretel in March, Jeunesse and Capriccio in July, and Harlequin in December.

In 1944 and 1945 two books were published in celebration of the Kirsova Ballet. The first, in 1944, was Kirsova Australian Ballet, a collection of drawings and sketches by Trevor Clara made backstage and in the wings during rehearsals and performances. It included a lengthy introduction by Kirsova in which she repeated her belief that ballet is a combination of many arts rather than just dancing, and that such artistic availability existed to be encouraged in Australia. She insisted that trying to keep ballet alive in war-time was "heart-breaking" but that she had done her best to do so, feeling that cultural entertainment during war "is more than ever necessary". She also made another plea for financial support for Australian Ballet. Copies of the book are hard to come by at a reasonable price, though the State Library of Victoria has made it freely available to read digitally.

In 1945, Peter Bellew published Pioneering Ballet in Australia, a well-illustrated history of the Kirsova Ballet with stories of the ballets in the company's repertoire, and many of the facts around their production. Due to the war, paper for book production was rationed, but Kirsova's wealthy patron, the newspaper owner Warwick Fairfax, used his influence with the government to allow the book to be published. It was republished in 1946 with an Introduction by the English critic Neville Cardus. Second-hand copies are readily available.

Kirsova's other singular legacy were the charitable donations from profits made by her ballet company, which were instrumental in purchasing blocks of land to establish a still-existing chain of children's playgrounds in Sydney's then poor and overcrowded inner suburbs, namely Kirsova Park 1 at 67 MacDonald St, Erskineville NSW 2043; Kirsova Park 2 at 136–140 George St, Erskineville NSW 2043; and Kirsova Park 3 at Wigram Lane, Glebe NSW 2037.

== Archives and research material ==
The Papers of Hélène Kirsova between 1932 and 1945, donated by Peter Bellew in 1986, are held by the National Gallery of Australia in Canberra, Australian Capital Territory. They comprise a large collection of press clippings, programmes, photographs of ballet performances and ballet dancers, lighting plots and original scores for a number of Kirsova's own choreographies and over 100 original set and costume designs commissioned by Kirsova during the 1940s. Further details are available in a National Gallery of Australia Research Library finding aid, which also links to Kirsova and Kirsova Ballet material in other collections.

A vast amount of material relating to Kirsova and the Kirsova Ballet is listed freely in Trove, the National Library of Australia's exhaustive collection of links to collections in Australian libraries, universities, museums, galleries and archives, consisting of newspapers, magazines, images, research, books, diaries, letters, people, organisations and websites.

Film exists of some of Kirsova's performances when in Australia with de Basil's Ballets Russes in 1936 and 1937. There is also film of Kirsova's wedding to Erick Fischer in 1938. This surviving footage can be freely viewed on the website of the National Film and Sound Archive of Australia.

Some of the productions of the Ballets Russes in Australia and of the Kirsova Ballet were filmed by a Melbourne balletomane and ciné enthusiast, Dr J Ringland Anderson. The films were first made public in a one-hour documentary, called Another Beginning, produced for Australian television in 1975. They have been transferred to nine hours of videotape and are available to researchers and dance historians in the Australian Archives of the Dance, held in the Performing Arts Collection of the Arts Centre Melbourne, Victoria where further photographs of Kirsova and the Kirsova Ballet are also held.

As well as those held by the National Gallery of Australia and the Melbourne Arts Centre, a significant number of photographs of Kirsova both off-stage and performing can be viewed in the website catalogue of the National Library of Australia.

Oral histories have been recorded by a number of dancers of the Kirsova Ballet, including Paul Hammond, Peggy Sager and Tamara Tchinarova. These can be listened to on the website of the National Library of Australia.
