= Rachel Cameron =

Australian ballet dancer and teacher (1924–2011)

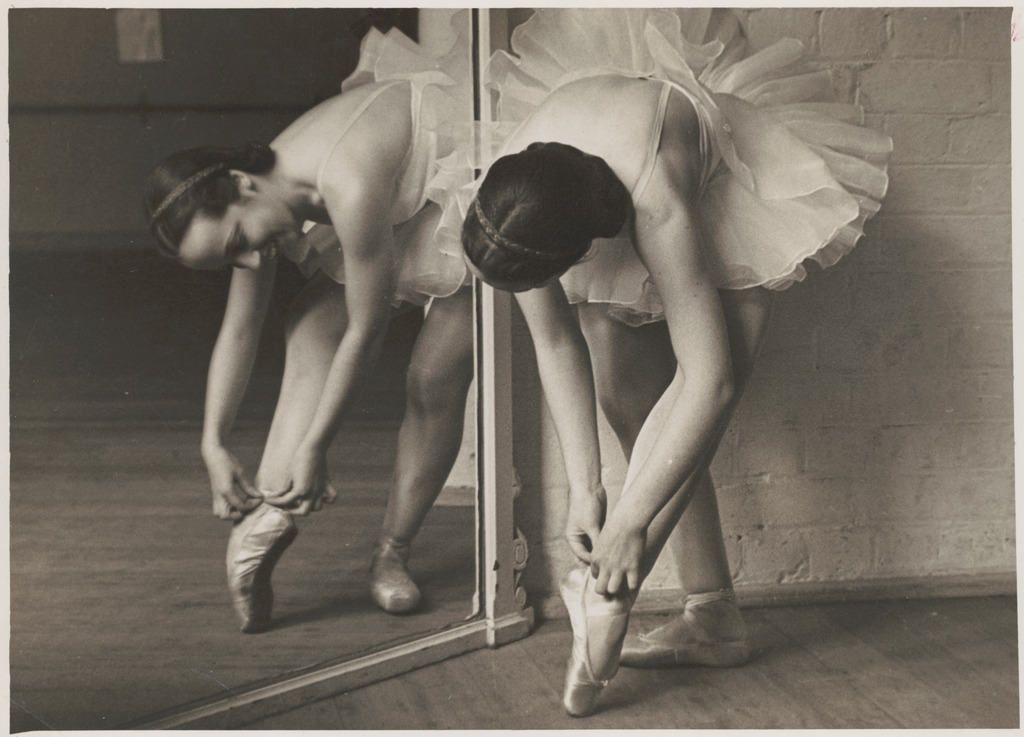
- Born: 27 March 1924; Brisbane, Queensland, Australia
- Died: 6 March 2011 (aged 86); London, United Kingdom
- Citizenship: Australia and United Kingdom
- Occupations: Ballet dancer and teacher
- Known for: Guardian of the Karsavina Syllabus at the Royal Academy of Dance, London
- Spouse: Keith Parker
- Awards: Queen Elizabeth II Coronation Award (Royal Academy of Dance)

Rachel Cameron (27 March 1924—6 March 2011) was an Australian ballet dancer and teacher. She was one of the leading dancers in early Australian ballet in the 1940s, performing with the Borovansky and Kirsova ballet companies, and was one of the first ballet dancers in Australia to reach the rank of principal. After emigrating to Great Britain she was an inspirational educator of ballet teachers at the Royal Academy of Dance in London for over forty years. In 2010, she received the Royal Academy of Dance's prestigious Queen Elizabeth II Coronation Award in recognition of her outstanding services to ballet.

== Early life ==
Rachel Cameron was born in Brisbane, Queensland, [Australia, on 27 March 1924. She spent her very early years in the coastal city of Townsville in north-eastern Queensland. She was severely ill as a child and was bored with the enforced regimen of rest imposed on her, but her parents noticed her love of movement and sent her to eurhythmics classes. She later reported that a passerby saw her dancing among some flowers and suggested that she take dance classes. She was enthusiastic about the idea and insisted in taking part when her school offered her dance lessons.

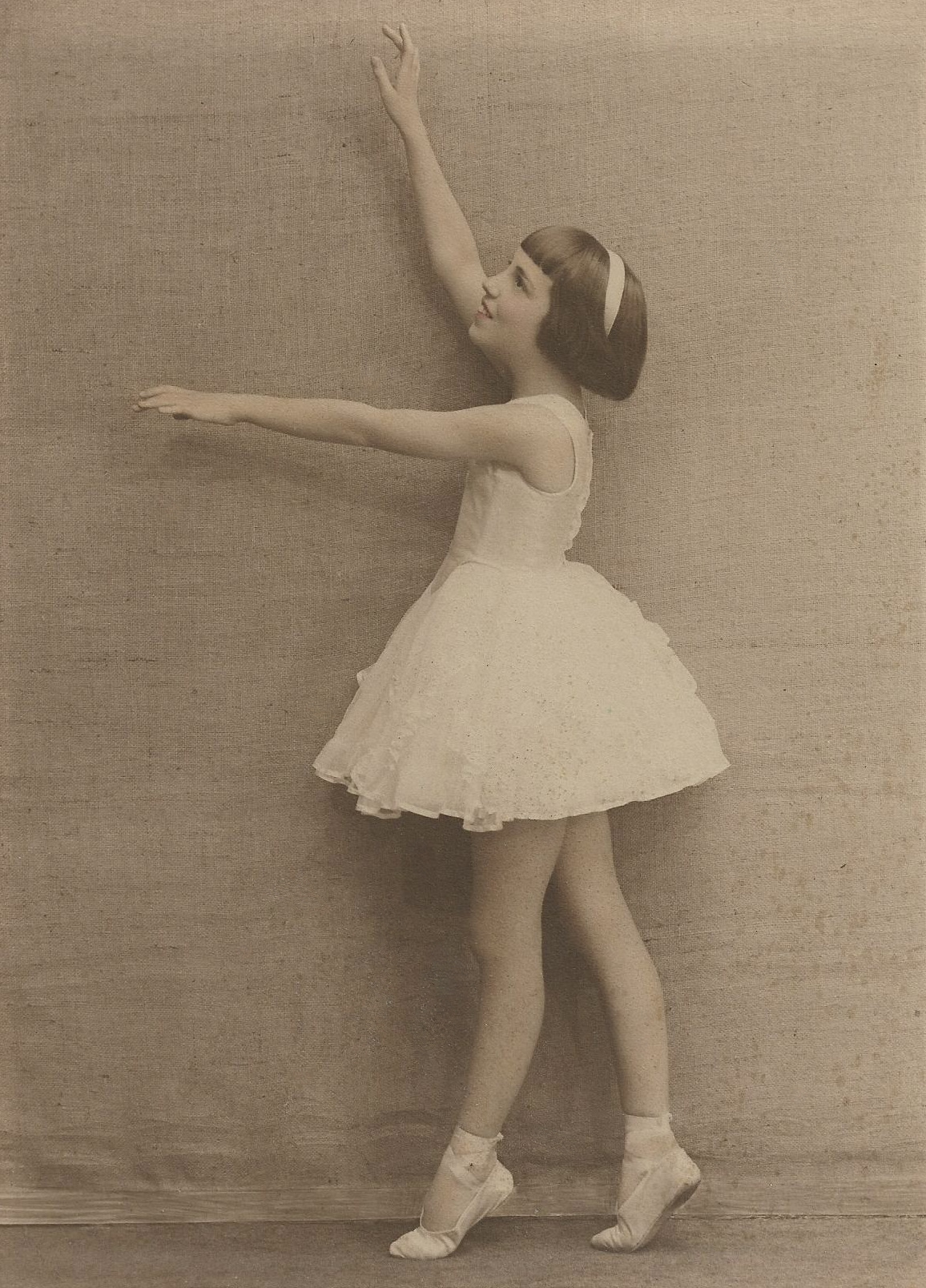
Rachel Cameron in about 1933

At this time Cameron, while only just five years old, saw the Russian prima ballerina Anna Pavlova, formerly of the Imperial Russian Ballet and the Ballets Russes of Sergei Diaghilev, dance in Townsville on her final Australian tour in 1929.

Following her father's transfer to another bank branch, the family moved from Townsville to Sydney in about 1930, settling in the suburb of Roseville, and it was in Sydney at the age of 10 that Cameron saw the legendary ballerina of the Paris Opera in the 1920s, Olga Spessivtseva, dance during her truncated tour of Australia with the Dandré-Levitoff Russian Ballet.

Enchanted with the world of dance, in Sydney Cameron was able to pursue further dance lessons with Muriel Sievers. Sievers had studied in London with prima ballerina Phyllis Bedells in the technique of the Association of Operatic Dancing (the forerunner of the Royal Academy of Dance). This English system was the foundation of Cameron's formal ballet training.

As her talent was recognised, the pupil-teacher relationship with Sievers quickly developed. She was invited by her to help teach the youngest classes on Saturday mornings, and as a result Cameron found early on that she had an aptitude for teaching which was to serve her (and the international ballet community) well for the rest of her life. Sievers also insisted that Cameron take piano lessons, and allowed her to borrow from her collection of books on dance. Interestingly for Cameron's future teaching career, among the books she borrowed was the Russian prima ballerina Tamara Karsavina's Theatre Street. Cameron recalled of Sievers: "She was wise and intelligent, and she fostered talent. She was well before her time."

== Training ==
In the course of her childhood studies, Cameron developed a strong desire to learn to dance professionally. As a girl in Sydney she was able to see the Ballets Russes perform in Australia on a number of tours, the first in 1936 when Cameron was 12. The influence of this Sergei Diaghilev-inspired company was profound on ballet in Australia and after their tours a number of dancers stayed behind. Among them were the Czech ballet dancer, choreographer and director, Edouard Borovansky, and his wife, Russian-born Xenia Nikolaeva Krüger, née Smirnova.

In May 1939, the Borovanskys set up a new ballet school in Melbourne, the Academy of Russian Ballet (later known as the Borovansky Ballet Academy). The studio filled the enormous first floor of Roma House in Elizabeth Street, above a shop selling devotional artefacts. Xenia Borovansky, a ballerina of the Moscow school, was the principal teacher. In starting their school the couple "embarked on an enterprise that permeated the subsequent history of ballet in Australia".

Soon after her fifteenth birthday, and funded by her family, Cameron joined the Borovansky academy. She was one of their first pupils in the special professional morning class held for those who were already dancers of some experience and who intended making dancing their career. The fees were not cheap; a single class was five shillings, though a commitment to taking more than one class in a week occasioned a reduction. Cameron was among a number of those attending the school in its early months whose balletic achievements in later years were profound.

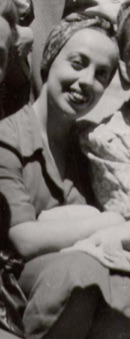
Rachel Cameron in about 1940

== Career ==
In June 1939, Cameron performed publicly for the first time, being, with Edna Busse, the first of Borovansky's pupils to dance outside the studio: a Melbourne newspaper reported that they danced to the music of Frédéric Chopin and Wolfgang Amadeus Mozart at a charity supper recital. In a short period of time, Borovansky's students were ready for their first joint public performance, though they were not viewed as necessarily that impressive. It has been reported that at this time Borovansky "had about a dozen girls who could dance reasonably well and about half a dozen boys, most of whom couldn't dance at all". With other dance schools they—including Cameron, at the time Borovansky's "showiest technician"—appeared in A First Season of Ballet arranged by the National Theatre Movement and presented at the Princess Theatre in Melbourne on 25 and 26 July 1939. Two weeks later the whole programme was repeated at a Saturday matinée.

At the close of 1939, Colonel Wassily de Basil, a Russian ballet impresario, brought his Ballets Russes to the Theatre Royal in Sydney at the start of an Australian tour, and, stung by bad publicity around his comment that Australians lacked the art and finesse to make ballet dancers, sought students from the Borovansky academy to perform as extras. Cameron and other senior pupils traveled to Sydney with the Borovanskys and continued with their classes while making appearances with the Russian Ballet. The 10–weeks season was an opportunity for Cameron, while still only 15, to study closely the work of the distinguished dancers of de Basil's company, such as Vera Nemtchinova, Lubov Tchernicheva and Tamara Toumanova, and to attend as many as she could of choreographer Michel Fokine's rehearsals of Le Coq d'Or with the company, conducted in Russian. "I didn't work with him because I was too young," recalled Cameron. "I was still lacking in technique."

Back in Melbourne in July 1940, Borovansky started to present his pupils to Melbourne audiences, usually in aid of the many war charity appeals. There were also monthly weekend programmes, often under the auspices of the Melbourne Ballet Club, which used a small stage set up in the Borovansky studio. Cameron soon discovered that despite performing publicly and being treated by Borovansky as if they were professionals, they were not paid. As a Borovansky historian has observed, there were limited opportunities for dancers to perform "so they tended to look on these unpaid events as a way of displaying their talents". But she further observes that as few journalists were employed by newspapers to write about ballet, and the charity events were "usually covered from a social angle, focusing on fashion and status, the artistic ability of the performers was rather inconsequential" and the dancers were rarely acknowledged for their unpaid appearances or their talent. As well as public performances, work also began on preparing a first full-scale ballet, Autumn Leaves, and other works like Vltava, Pas Classique and L'Amour Ridicule.

=== Borovansky Australian Ballet Company ===
With increasing public acclaim and the growing maturity of his leading students, Borovansky established the Australian Ballet Company, whose first staging was a successful two-night season at the Comedy Theatre in Melbourne in December 1940. Cameron was picked out by The Age newspaper for her excellence in the Pavlova role of the Chrysanthemum alongside Serge Bousloff in Autumn Leaves.

Cameron, fast developing her powers, was now one of Borovansky's leading dancers and considered to be highly promising. She was "highly sensitive, lyrical and musical", though it was also said her line was "a little short for a truly classical dancer". But despite her growing success she despaired at times of a professional career. Cameron's training "cost a lot of money and there was little likelihood at that early stage of getting any of it back in payment for performances". On 31 March 1941, in search of funds and without Borovansky's permission, she performed with a fellow student for a fee at the Melbourne University Bal Masque. They appeared as "Rachel Cameron and Laurie Rentoul: Danse Espagnol".

When he heard of it, Borovansky's rage was directed at Cameron with full force. He summoned everyone in the studio to the main classroom and called Cameron into the middle of the room. He railed at her that she had gone against his wishes, lowered his standards and performed in a very bad way. "I don't want to see you again, ever!" he concluded. "We couldn't possibly permit you to continue working with us." Cameron, angry and humiliated, left the building in tears. She was never to return.

=== Kirsova Ballet ===
"Brutally discarded" by Borovansky, and just 17, in April 1941 Cameron left Melbourne and went home to Sydney. There Hélène Kirsova immediately invited her to join her School of Russian Ballet Tradition. Kirsova was a Danish prima ballerina with a background in the Ballets Russes de Monte-Carlo, and a close working relationship with the choreographer Michel Fokine. After touring Australia with the Ballets Russes in 1936 she remained in the country and married the Danish Consul. She set up her school at Macquarie Place near Circular Quay in Sydney in 1940.

Cameron attended her "technically demanding" classes which had a great emphasis on turns, beats and jumps and on "speed, footwork and brain" The classes were mentally and physically demanding. Kirsova soon discovered that in Cameron she had a supreme technician whose lyrical talent she was able to extend. She also recognised that her new protégée had teaching skills and quickly encouraged her to develop them at the school.

Soon after Cameron arrived, Kirsova established her own ballet company, which was eventually known as the Kirsova Ballet and "remained true to the Diaghilev principles", according to Cameron. Young Australian dancers Strelsa Heckelman, Helene Ffrance, Henry Legerton and Paul Hammond (who at the time was calling himself Paul Clementin), and a New Zealander Peggy Sager, were all Kirsova's protégés and along with former Ballets Russes dancers Tamara Tchinarova, Raissa Koussnetsova, Valentin Zeglovsky and Edouard Sobichevsky they were destined by the end of the year to form the nucleus of the first professional ballet company in Australia. But, outstandingly, Kirsova's leading Australian dancer at the beginnings of the company and remaining with utmost loyalty to its end, was Rachel Cameron.

The Kirsova Ballet began, as had Borovansky's, with a series of performances in aid of charity, but in November 1941 Kirsova was able to present her first major season of six weeks at the Minerva Theatre in Kings Cross, Sydney. The dancers, including Cameron, were paid trade union rates for the first time and Kirsova paid their dues to Actors Equity of Australia, which registered them as professional performers. "We worked all day," Cameron later recalled. "A class at 9am, then rehearsal, an hour's break for lunch, rehearsals again, and a performance at 8pm." Their rates of pay were low: Tamara Tchinarova, for instance was paid only £3 a week, and only while working.

During the season at the Minerva, Cameron appeared in Les Matelots, played the part of Mephistophela in Faust, and danced "charmingly", partnered by Henry Legerton, in Les Sylphides. Les Sylphides and Faust, with Cameron featured again, appeared once more when the Kirsova Ballet moved to Melbourne for a season at His Majesty's Theatre on 31 January 1942. Cameron's "sensitivity and musicality" in Faust "staggered critics and proved false immediately the popular theory that the Australian temperament is not capable of dramatic depths".

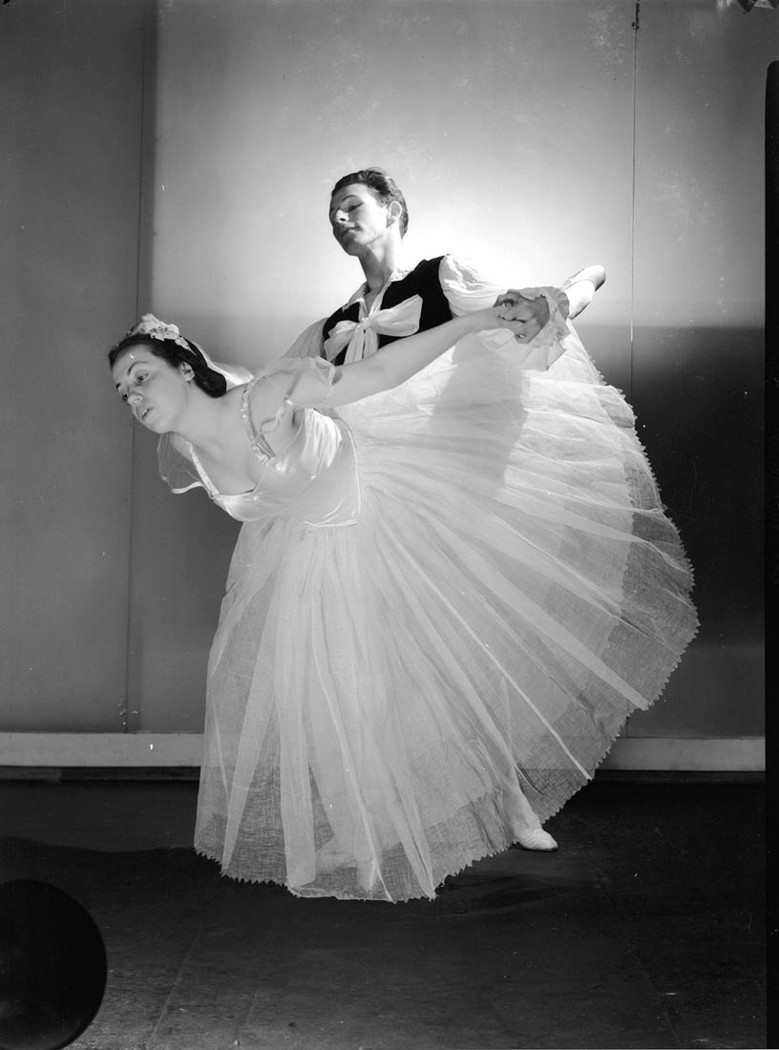
Rachel Cameron and Henry Legerton in the Kirsova Ballet Les Sylphides, Max Dupain Studio, Sydney, between 1941 and 1944. Photographer Max Dupain

Cameron was now one of Kirsova's leading dancers, making her debut as a principal ballerina in February 1943, and she was to stay with the company until October 1945, performing seasons in Sydney and tours to Melbourne, Adelaide and Brisbane. The company's ever–widening repertoire over the years included several original Kirsova works, such as Revolution of the Umbrellas, Harlequin, and Jeunesse together with a choice of the classics, like Swan Lake, Les Sylphides and Aurora's Wedding. In all, there were 14 ballets in the Kirsova Ballet repertoire.

The role of Little Anna was created in Revolution of the Umbrellas specifically to suit Cameron's musical understanding and dramatic intensity. The Sydney Morning Herald declared that her performance "would command attention anywhere in the world". Another Kirsova creation, Harlequin, based on Maurice Ravel's Rapsodie espagnole, showed Cameron as "a dancer possessing intense musicality and poetic understanding - an artist as well as a dancer", while another chance for Cameron to show her musical sensitivity occurred in Kirsova's Jeunesse, based on a piece by Francis Poulenc.

Kirsova herself, and the critics, agreed that Rachel Cameron was "world class". Kirsova was so pleased with all of her enthusiastic performers that she would have taken the company overseas if there had been no wartime restrictions. She remarked to Cameron that "if she could take us to Europe we would cause a sensation".

Kirsova's associate, Peter Bellew, declared:

Rachel Cameron is a dancer of rare musical sensitivity and intelligence. These qualities, in spite of her rather strong build, give her an exceptionally wide range from classical and romantic roles to the flamboyant characterisation of Rosita in Capriccio and enable her to give a truly spiritual interpretation of the pas de deux in Les Sylphides .. She is so convincing and gives such strength of characterisation to any role she creates that she makes it difficult to imagine them in other hands.

Dance journalist David Jays has written that Cameron

advanced quickly through the ranks; she was a quick study, invaluable if someone was injured. On stage, she married diamond technique to vibrant lyricism, aided by huge, expressive eyes. Her jump was exceptional, her placement unfailingly neat … she was extraordinarily dramatic ... she wasn't very tall, but she had this very, very expressive face.

Australian dance writer and archivist, Michelle Potter, has written that Cameron's "happiest days as a dancer were with Kirsova". She reports that Cameron recalled of Kirsova: "She was a woman who tried to mould her company in the Diaghilev tradition where music, the scenery, the dancers became part of one whole, and there it was I think that the true beginnings of Australian ballet lie."

The Kirsova Ballet's final performance was in Brisbane in May 1944. Though the almost monopolistic Australian theatre–owning company JC Williamson offered Kirsova a long–term contract, she was unable to compromise her individualism and creativity in the way JC Williamson required, and declined. Discovering that she was then unable to book their theatres for any more tours, and unable to offer her dancers regular work, she gave permission for them to take work with Edouard Borovansky, whose professional company was now in the ascendant.

Cameron, who would have no more dealings with Borovansky following his treatment of her, remained with Kirsova. A number of Kirsova's other principal dancers also stayed. There were plans made for a season in Sydney in September 1944, but it was postponed indefinitely, ostensibly because Kirsova was unable to buy costume materials because of wartime rationing, but it was more likely the loss of many of her dancers to Borovansky, combined with the lack of theatres available to her, caused the abandonment of the season. Despite rehearsing a new set of ballets for a two–week season at Brisbane City Hall in October 1945, the booking there was cancelled by the city authorities in favour of entertainment for servicemen. At this point, Kirsova closed her company but she continued to operate her ballet school. This gave Cameron the opportunity to further pursue and develop her expertise in teaching, but the school closed in 1946.

To make ends meet, Cameron had to work as a shop assistant in a Sydney book store, the Craftsman Bookshop, but she continued to take classes. She attended evening sessions run by Valya Kouznetsova, a dancer of the Moscow school, who had also stayed in Australia after one of the Ballets Russes tours. Cameron later recalled: "She was no less strict than Kirsova. As I was more advanced than most of her pupils, she told me from the beginning that she wouldn't waste time on correcting me, but would thump me with a ruler, which she did, so that I was covered in bruises."

=== Ballet of the Australian Choreographic Society ===
Cameron had become involved with the Australian Choreographic Society, a group founded in 1944 to sponsor the development of ballet in Australia with the aim of establishing a permanent company which would perform only original works rather than established ballets. In 1946 the Society formed its first company. The producer was Philippe Perrottet, a close friend of Cameron who had been a student with her at the Borovansky studio but had been fired in a typical Borovansky rage shortly before Cameron's ejection, and had just emerged from four years' wartime service with the Royal Australian Air Force. Cameron joined him as assistant producer and she and Perrottet and four other dancers were the sole performers of the pocket–sized company. They had a permanent coach in Kira Abricossova. "She gave good classes, but difficult ones," said Cameron. "Discipline with her — as with Kirsova and with Borovansky, who was known as a tyrant — was very severe."

The repertoire of original works, choreographed by Perrottet and Thadée Slavinsky, included Arckaringa, one of the first ballets with a story derived from Aboriginal legend. Cameron was one of the principal dancers in the ballet, playing the character of Night. The other major work, The Three Lemons, also featured Cameron and she was judged by Melbourne dance critics to be "outstanding" and to have danced "alluringly". A tour of the state of Victoria in August 1946 was followed by visits to Sydney and Melbourne in September, November and December that year. Financial difficulties then overtook the troupe and it was forced to disband at the beginning of 1947.

=== Cameron and Perrottet ===
Following the closure of the Australian Ballet Society company, Cameron stayed with her friend Philippe Perrottet to briefly form a dance act called Cameron & Perrottet. February 1947 found them performing in a theatrical revue, a vehicle for the diminutive British comedian Wee Georgie Wood, called Hi-Ho Piccadilly. They stayed with the show throughout its season from February to April at the Tivoli Theatre in Melbourne.

=== National Theatre Movement ===
In September 1947, in a short season in Melbourne, Cameron appeared as a guest solo artist with the National Theatre Movement ballet group in a new Australian ballet Euroka, based on aboriginal mythology, and in a number of other popular ballets. "Rachel Cameron," enthused the dance critic of The Age, "displayed thrilling technique in Perpetuum … and set a welcome standard in the divertissements, which included the charming Gigue."

=== Ballet Rambert ===
Also in September 1947, Cameron was among a number of leading Australian dancers invited to supplement the British dance company Ballet Rambert on their Australasian tour from 1947 to 1949. Led by its founder and director, the Polish-born Marie Rambert, the extensive tour included a great variety of work, both classical and modern.

The impact of the tour on the Australian public, used to the large–scale Russian style but now presented with smaller works — art rather than spectacle — was immediate: the company was received with "feverish acclaim" and the public were delighted to recognise some of their home–grown ballet stars, like Cameron, amongst the visiting company. An initial six–month tour was extended to 15 months and Rambert sent home twice for more ballets to cope with the enthusiastic demand.

From October 1947 to May 1948, the company visited the Princess Theatre in Melbourne, the Crystal Theatre in Broken Hill in New South Wales (for a brief 3–day season) and the New Tivoli Theatre in Sydney, and then from May to July 1948 in New Zealand where they performed at St. James Theatre in Auckland, St. James Theatre in Wellington and then His Majesty's Theatre in Dunedin.

Throughout the Australian and New Zealand legs of the tour Cameron danced in the popular classics, Giselle and Les Sylphides, with choreography by Michel Fokine, and in Gustav Holst's The Planets, with contemporary choreography by Antony Tudor. All three premiered in Melbourne in October and November 1947.

Though the Rambert tour was to return to Australia to continue, Cameron left the company following the last engagement in New Zealand on 14 July 1948.

=== Emigration to Great Britain ===
Cameron, by now married for just over 18 months, left Australasia for Britain in 1948, with the intention of widening her experience and opportunities. "I felt that I didn't know enough, hadn't seen enough, hadn't learnt enough," Cameron declared in an interview towards the end of her life. She wanted to hone her training in Europe with distinguished teachers like Olga Preobrajenska, Vera Volkova and Kirsova's teacher Lyubov Yegorova.

Cameron and her husband, Keith Parker, left Wellington, New Zealand on the Shaw, Savill & Albion Line steamship Arawa, in August 1948, sailing via Cape Town and Tenerife for Liverpool, where they arrived on 29 September.

London remained Cameron's home for the rest of her life. In 1948, however, Cameron, in common with the many Australian dancers who emigrated to Britain in the years after the Second World War, found a grim postwar environment and limited opportunities to perform. She also came to see that she should have left Australia earlier. "English ballet had developed rapidly after the war, but I realised that I was too late," she recalled. "Although I received the highest compliments, from Ninette de Valois among others, no-one wanted to take me. I was an Australian, and the English companies wanted English dancers."

=== Song of Norway ===
Short of money, Cameron joined the 1948–49 tour of the operetta Song of Norway. It was playing many of the major touring theatres in Britain with one–week or two–week seasons in each venue. The show featured a fifteen–minute ballet at the close, choreographed by Robert Helpmann and performed in the London West End theatre version by the Ballets Russes de Monte Carlo. A theatre critic in Manchester described the ballet as "mediocre", though in Birmingham it was considered "an exquisite spectacle".

=== Studying in Paris, France ===
After leaving Song of Norway, although she had severely limited funds, Cameron travelled to Paris to study for a time with the former Ballets Russes ballerina Lyubov Yegorova and with Olga Preobrajenska, formerly of the Russian Imperial Ballet, and one of the most prominent ballet teachers in Paris. Preobrajenska, seeing how poor Cameron was, offered to give her every second class free. "She taught me so much, paying especial attention to style," remembered Cameron.

=== The Continental Ballet Company ===
Returning to London, Cameron joined a small ballet troupe, The Continental Ballet Company, one of several small touring ballet companies "all vying for a living and living a hand–to–mouth existence". The Continental Ballet had been founded in 1945 (as the Empire Ballet) by Molly Lake, a British ballerina and pupil of Serafina Astafieva and Enrico Cecchetti, and who had danced in the companies of Pavlova and Markova–Dolin. Her ballet group toured around many of the smaller theatres in Britain with herself as choreographer and her husband Travis Kemp being the main leads, and a group of about nine other leading dancers and a corps de ballet. In the early 1950s Cameron became one of the leading dancers in the company and toured regularly with them for two years or so, being particularly noticed as one of the Ugly Sisters in a full–length production of Cinderella.

=== Ballet demonstrator ===
Cameron stated that one of the most exciting periods of her life came when she was asked to demonstrate for two great teachers and former ballerinas, Lydia Sokolova and Tamara Karsavina. Molly Lake recommended Cameron to Sokolova, an English ballerina who had danced with Diaghilev's Ballets Russes for 16 years. Sokolova was looking for a dancer to demonstrate the steps she would be describing in a forthcoming lecture for the British Society of Ballet Teachers. She invited Cameron to take on the task. "She was wonderful to work for," Cameron told an interviewer in 2005, and recalled: "Sokolova was absolutely marvellous. She was not content with near being good enough, it had to be exact or else."

When the Society subsequently invited Tamara Karsavina, a Russian prima ballerina, the most famous of Diaghilev's ballerinas, who had been a principal artist of the Imperial Russian Ballet and later of the Diaghilev Ballets Russes, to give a lecture on mime, Sokolova put Cameron forward to do the demonstration. For Cameron it was the beginning of a long and loving relationship with Karsavina. "Her classes were like a dream come true for me," Cameron recalled in her 2005 interview. "She liked my performance and whenever she was going to give a class she would always ask me to demonstrate for her." Cameron became a lifelong friend of "TK", as she called her. "I found for the first time that what I had always dreamed of was true," she later recalled, "and that's why, now, I am such a stickler for perfection of technique."

=== Royal Academy of Dance ===
In the second half of the 1950s Cameron, by now aged over 30 and discovering a vocation as a teacher, gradually began to withdraw from performance in favour of acting as an educator and ballet master (though at the time she would have been referred to as a ballet mistress). Her work with first Sokolova and then Karsavina marked the beginnings of her move into the teaching phase of her career, which was to continue with increasing acclaim until nearly the end of her life.

On leaving the Continental Ballet she "joined Keith Lester's troupe". Lester was a British dancer and choreographer who had been schooled in the Diaghilev tradition, had trained with Anton Dolin, Serafina Astafieva, Nikolai Legat and Fokine and had partnered Tamara Karsavina on her European tours for three years in the late 1920s, remaining as a close collaborator with her thereafter. He was much valued as one of the greatest exponents of classical dance partnering. Around the time Cameron joined him he was principal dancer and choreographer at London's Windmill Theatre, staging over 150 shows, and creating the revue theatre's famous fan dances, but he was simultaneously developing a strong teaching career at the Royal Ballet School and at the Royal Academy of Dance (the RAD), where he eventually became Director of its Teacher Training Course.

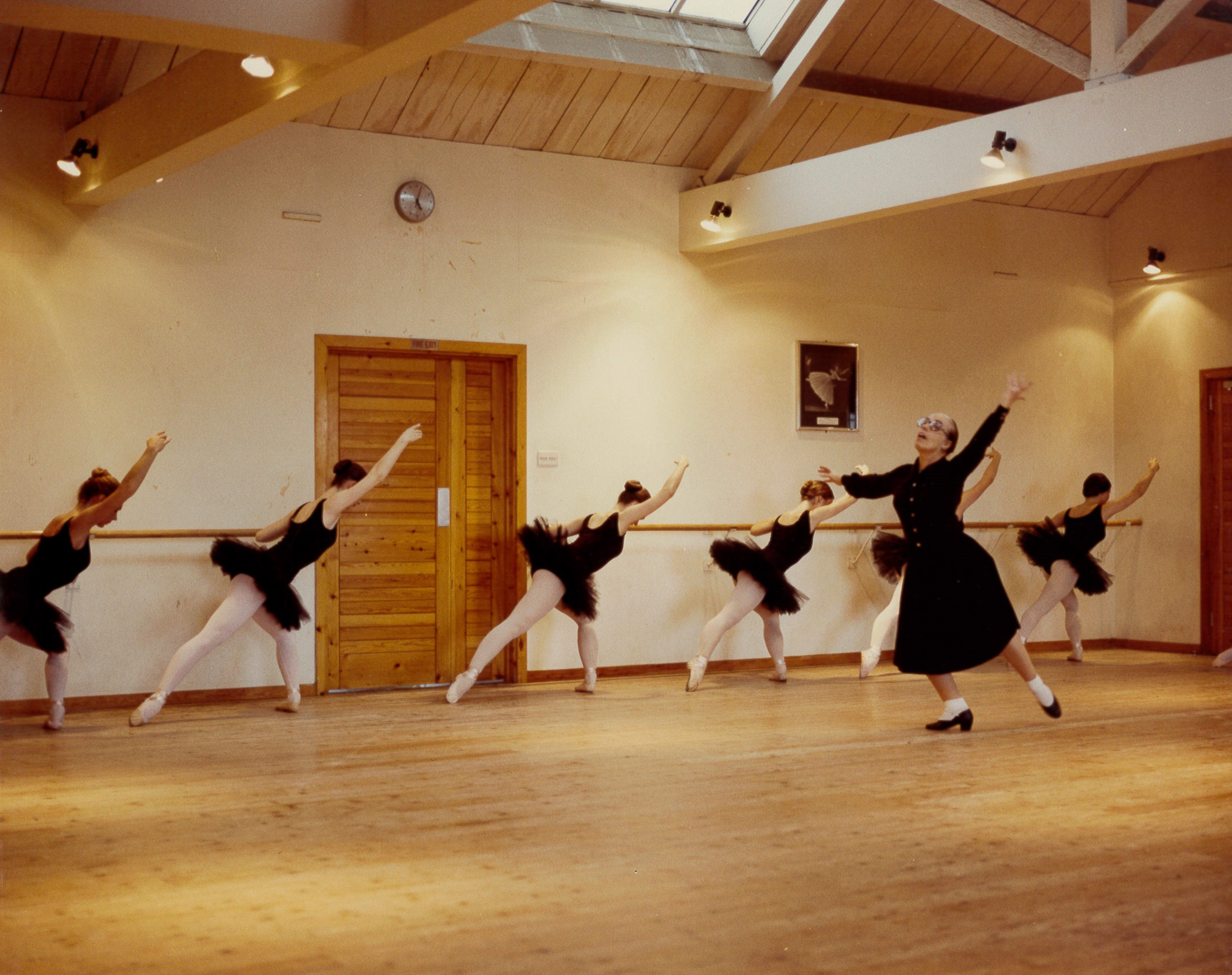
Rachel Cameron teaches Royal Academy of Dance students, c1978

Cameron, benefiting from her professional alliances with both Lester and Karsavina, became increasingly involved in teaching at the RAD, particularly through the development and perpetuation of the Karsavina Syllabus. Karsavina had been influential in the formation of The Association of Operatic Dancing (the predecessor to the RAD) in 1920 and had become the RAD's first Vice President in 1949. Drawing on her own training in pre-revolutionary Russia, she created and established the Karsavina Syllabus for the Teacher Training Course at the academy and it was formally launched in 1954. The Syllabus is not an examination syllabus; it is specifically designed to enhance and supplement practical study. It concentrates on technique, musicality and the quality of movement and the different styles of ballet. While somewhat revised since Karsavina created it, not least by Cameron, it is still a crucial part of RAD teacher training and education.

Cameron was instrumental in helping Karsavina in her development of the Syllabus and in its instruction, demonstrating technical points as Karsavina was no longer able to dance. "Karsavina's teaching was pretty hot stuff," Cameron recalled. "She was beautiful. It sounds ridiculous, but you only had to see her slide her feet into fifth and you just melted." After Karsavina's retirement only a handful of teachers have taught the Syllabus. Until the end of the twentieth century most of them, like Cameron, had studied it under Karsavina herself and were entrusted by her to teach it. Audrey Knight-Ellis taught it until 1956, Claude Newman from then until 1961. Then Keith Lester took over. Cameron assisted all of them.

In 1973, at the request of Karsavina, Cameron took over the Syllabus as its tutor and guardian. She continued training ballet teachers in the second and third years of their studies, a role she held for over twenty-five years.

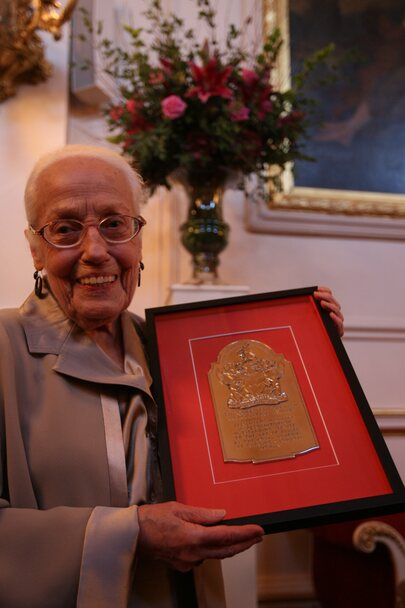
Rachel Cameron receives the Queen Elizabeth II Coronation Award at the Royal Opera House, October 2010

She took much satisfaction in her task. One of her obituarists noted that she "delighted to see 'understanding transmitted through the body'. She claimed to be able to discern something of the personality of each student, simply by watching how their bodies inhabited the world." Her successor in charge of the Karsavina Syllabus, Joahne O'Hara, remembered that "She was very quiet. Each student was different. There was a lot of talk between her and them and what did they think about this and how could that be better … She never shouted at anybody, but she got what she wanted out of every student — everything. And they all learned." As a teacher, she was exacting, demanding full attention. If students were a minute late, they were late, and they would have to catch up in their own way.

While working at the RAD, her reputation as a ballet teacher at its peak, Cameron was also for many years in great demand as a guest teacher for companies, theatres and ballet schools around the world, including the Royal Ballet School, The Australian Ballet, Scottish Ballet and Israel's Bat-Dor Dance Company, "aspiring to achieve the purity of form that my Russian teachers had taught me".

In 1994, when Cameron was approaching retirement the Board of the RAD awarded Cameron the designation of Honorary Fellow of the Royal Academy of Dance. This award is made to a person who has made an outstanding contribution to the art of dance or rendered exceptionally meritorious service to the academy.

Cameron remained in charge of the Syllabus until her formal retirement in 1996. In 1997 at the age of 74 she was awarded a Bachelor of Philosophy (Hons) degree in Ballet and Contextual Studies from Durham University. In her degree dissertation she conducted an investigation and examination of the Karsavina Syllabus. The work offers unique insights into her knowledge of the Syllabus. It is unpublished, but it is held by the Library of the Royal Academy of Dance.

In a climax to her career, in 2010, barely six months before her death, Cameron was presented with the prestigious Queen Elizabeth II Coronation Award in recognition of outstanding services to ballet. It is the highest honour that can be awarded by the Royal Academy of Dance. It was established in 1953 and previous recipients had included Ninette de Valois, Tamara Karsavina, Marie Rambert, Frederick Ashton and Rudolph Nureyev.

=== Montessorri schooling ===
Cameron and her husband, Keith Parker, were strong believers in the child–centred Montessori method of education. Together they took over the Carroll Primary School in Gunterstone Road in West London in 1957 which they ran on Montessorri lines. Parker became head teacher and was also involved in the training of Montessori teachers nationally and internationally. Cameron, as well as leading classes at the RAD, taught the youngest children at the school, enjoying their ability to absorb her teaching. "Like blotting paper," she said.

Cameron continued to run the school after Parker's death in 1984 but eventually closed it in July 1992.

== Personal life ==
On 10 December 1946 in Melbourne, Cameron married Keith Frederick Parker, a recently discharged Royal Australian Air Force warrant officer. During the Second World War Parker had piloted aircraft in England. They had met when they were teenagers. As a 17–year–old, working as a clerk for The Australian Women's Weekly in Melbourne, Parker had maintained that ballet was a European art and that Australians could not dance. When he saw Cameron perform he abruptly changed his mind and proposed to her when he was still 17 and she was 15. She refused him, but he continued to propose throughout his wartime service. At the end of the war he was finally accepted by Cameron. They were together until his sudden death in London in 1984. They had no children.

Once in London, Cameron and Parker at first lived in Ledbury Road in Notting Hill, but then rented part of a large house in Tanza Road in Hampstead, backing onto Parliament Hill Fields. They were able to buy the house in the 1960s. In 1975 they also bought a property in the village of Cormot-le-Grand in the Côte-d'Or department in eastern France. Cameron continued to drive there from London, even in her old age. Cameron and Parker both became British citizens to make their international travel easier.

They were always generous in their hospitality to friends seeking shelter or a place to work, and Cameron continued to be visited regularly by former pupils, students and colleagues. "Cameron was a delight to work with," recalled one colleague. "A tiny, charming lady with mischievous eyes and a generous smile, she shared her stories and her knowledge willingly."

Cameron died on 6 March 2011 at her home in Hampstead, at age 86.

== Legacy and influence ==
Cameron left all her balletic effects, "including paintings, lithographs, memorabilia, books and all written work", to performance archives. The Rachel Cameron collection was split between the Royal Academy of Dance, who received papers relating to her work there, and the Theatre and Performance Collection of the Victoria & Albert Museum in London who received all her other performance–based materials, including costumes and costume designs related to Tamara Karsavina's career, which are catalogued as the Rachel Cameron Bequest.

In Cameron's memory, in 2018 the Royal Academy of Dance established the Rachel Cameron Prize. This is awarded annually to a Faculty of Education student studying at level 5 or 6 who has demonstrated exemplary attendance, the most progress in understanding the qualities, style, musicality and historical aspects of the Karsavina Syllabus, and displayed a positive attitude and consistent interest.

Cameron's successor, Joahne O'Hara, declared: "I think she would have been most proud of the fact that she taught the beautiful Karsavina Syllabus for so many years to students who were going to be teachers and who loved it and loved her and went out understanding so much more than just mere technique."

One obituarist described her as "the keeper of the flame … that very small body was a repository of the history of ballet."

Cameron was, through Tamara Karsavina, a direct link to Sergei Diaghilev for a multitude of ballet teachers, and through them for the ballet dancers of today.
