= Emilie Walbom =

Danish ballet dancer and choreographer

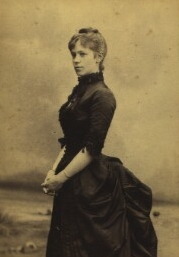
Emilie Walbom

Johanne Emilie Margrethe Walbom née Egense (1858–1932) was a Danish ballet dancer and choreographer. During her exceptionally long term of 61 years with the Royal Danish Ballet, she progressed from ballet dancer to the company's first female choreographer in 1878. In 1915, she became its first "ballet mistress", albeit under the ballet master Gustav Uhlendorff.

== Biography ==
Born on 27 October 1858 in Copenhagen, Emilie Egense was the daughter of the cloakroom manager at the Royal Theatre Frederik Ludvig Egense (1829-1901) and Anna Thora Maria Stendrup (1829-1907). Her aunt, Emilie Liebe, was an opera singer at the theatre when Walbon entered the ballet school at the age of five.

Walbom made her début as the cadet Poul in Bournonville's Fjernt fra Danmark in 1873. While she lacked the looks and the movement of a first-class ballet dancer, she was a fine actress and soon took on mime roles with success.

In 1881, she married the dancer and opera singer Arnold Alfred Constantin Walborn, but following his death in 1898, she was left with three children to raise. She therefore decided to increase the family income by becoming a ballet teacher. She quickly attracted the daughters of Copenhagen's more affluent families, especially those who wished to making dancing their career. In 1910, she established a ballet school (Fru Walboms Balletskole), which she headed until 1928. Every year, the season finished with a matinée featuring her own choreographic creations based on her trips to Berlin, Vienna and Paris.

Her work as a choreographer with the Royal Theatre began in 1906 under the ballet master Hans Beck. Her first success was her adaptation of Marius Petipa's Les millions d'Arlequin, which proved popular with both the cast and the audience. It was followed in 1908 by Askepot (Cinderella), with her own libretto and music composed by Otto Malling. Drømmebilleder (1915) proved to be her masterpiece. Based on Michel Fokine's Carnaval which was created for Les Ballets Russes, it was fully adapted to Denmark and arranged for music by H.C. Lumbye. It led the way to a new approach to Danish ballet inspired by Les Ballets Russes, with further works in the same style. Another success was En Nat i Ægypten (1918), based on Folkine's Cleopatra. All in all, she created 15 new works, 11 ballets and one ballet pantomime, and two plays.

Walbom continued to teach until the end. Her students included Marguerite Viby, Karin Nellemose and Vera Gebuhr, all of whom gained fame both on the stage and as film actresses. She died unexpectedly on 23 October 1932 while in a tram.
