= Valentin Zeglovsky =

Russian ballet dancer

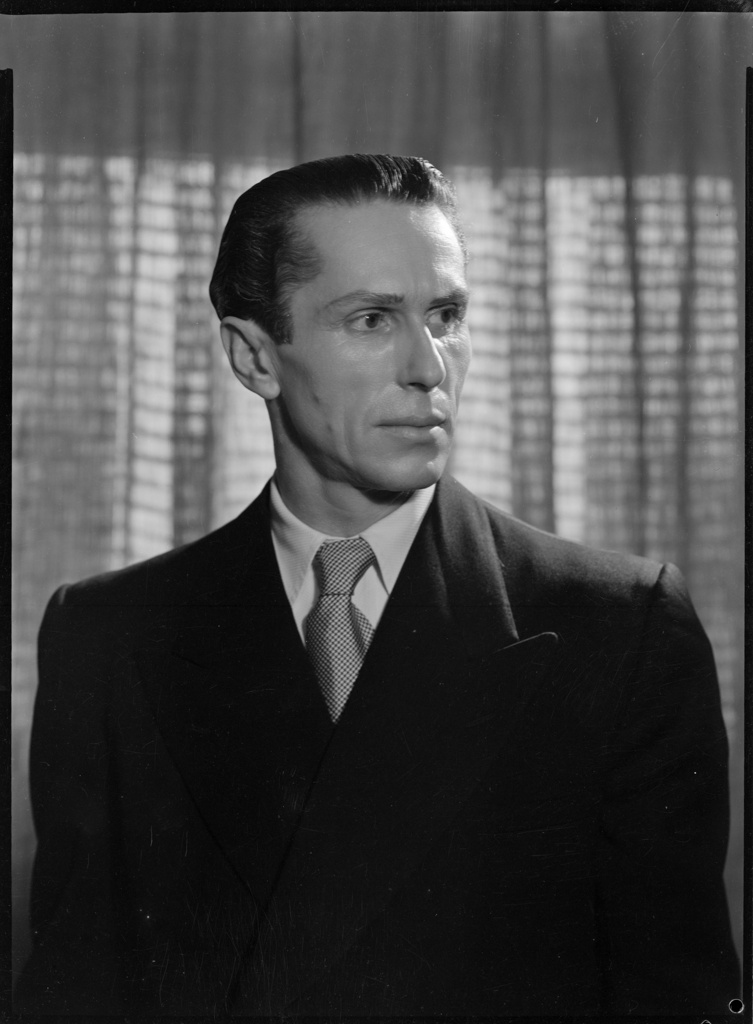
Valentin Zeglovsky, Australia, 1947

Valentin Zeglovsky (1908–1985) was a ballet dancer with the Ballets Russes who was one of the de Basil dancers who is considered to have contributed to Australian ballet.

Zeglovsky was born in Kharkiv, Russian Empire. After the Russian Revolution his family moved to the Riga in Latvia. Initially interested in boxing he took up ballet in an attempt to improve his footwork. He then trained at the Riga Opera House under Madame Feodorova, sister-in-law of Michel Fokine. In the 1930s he joined the de Basil company in the United States of America and later in 1938 came to Australia with the troupe.

At the end of the second Ballets Russes tour of Australia Zeglovsky settled in that country in April 1939. In the same year he established a school in Sydney, and performed with an Australian company in June 1939, where he danced with Tamara Tchinarova and Kira Abricossova at a benefit performance organised by Edouard Borovansky, at the Princess Theatre in Melbourne.

In January 1942 he joined the Kirsova company during its Melbourne season which began at His Majesty's Theatre. Zeglovsky returned to Europe in 1949, or soon after, and started Zeglovsky's ballet school in London, where Zbyshek Lisak trained under him.

== See also ==
- List of Russian ballet dancers
