= 2023 Australia Day Honours =

Annual honours list

The 2023 Australia Day Honours are appointments to various orders and honours to recognise and reward good works by Australian citizens. The list was announced on 26 January 2023 by the Governor General of Australia, David Hurley.

The Australia Day Honours are the first of the two major annual honours lists, the first announced to coincide with Australia Day (26 January), with the other being the King's Birthday Honours, which are announced on the second Monday in June.

== Order of Australia ==
Order of Australia civil ribbon

Order of Australia military ribbon

=== Companion of the Order of Australia (AC) ===
==== General Division ====
- The Honourable James Leslie Allsop, AO – For eminent service to the judiciary and to the law, to organisational and technological reform, to legal education, and to insolvency law.
- His Excellency the Honourable Christopher John Dawson, APM – For eminent service to public administration through law enforcement roles, to reconciliation, and as the 34th Governor appointed in Western Australia.
- Professor Emeritus Peter Hannaford – For eminent service to science, particularly to experimental physics, as an academic and researcher, to professional institutions, and as a role model for young scientists.
- Professor Melissa Helen Little – For eminent service to medical research through pioneering contributions to regenerative therapies for kidney disease, and to stem cell medicine.
- The Honourable Margaret Reynolds – For eminent service to the people and Parliament of Australia, to social justice, gender equality and Indigenous rights, to local government, and to the community.
- The late Archibald William Roach, AM – For eminent service to the performing arts as a songwriter and musician, to Indigenous rights and reconciliation, and through support for emerging First Nations artists.

=== Officer of the Order of Australia (AO) ===
==== General Division ====
- Dr Michele Judy Allan – For distinguished service to the agricultural, food production and business sectors, and to tertiary education.
- Emeritus Professor Warwick Peter Anderson, AM – For distinguished service to health and medical research organisations, and to professional associations.
- Glenys Beauchamp, PSM – For distinguished service to public administration, particularly innovative health reform, industry and science policy, and program delivery.
- Professor Michael Claude Berndt – For distinguished service to medical research in the field of haematology, to tertiary education, and to the promotion of science.
- Distinguished Professor Matthew Malcolm Colless – For distinguished service to scientific research, particularly to astronomy and astrophysics, and to professional societies.
- Professor Clare Elizabeth Collins – For distinguished service to nutritional health and dietetics research and communication, and to scientific organisations.
- The late Dr Kenneth Ernest Collins, AM – For distinguished service to international humanitarian projects, and to the community of Western Australia.
- Professor Steven Collins – For distinguished service to medical and health science research, particularly in the field of prion disease.
- Professor Mark James Cook – For distinguished service to neurological medicine and research through contributions to the treatment of epilepsy.
- Dr John Alexander Craven – For distinguished service to food biosecurity and environmental safety, to veterinary science research, and to the dairy industry.
- Paul Noel Dainty, AM – For distinguished service to the community through the organisation of charitable events following the Bushfires 2019–20.
- Amanda Mary Elliott – For distinguished service to the horse racing industry through a range of executive roles, and to the community.
- Katrina Roslyn Fanning, PSM – For distinguished service to the Indigenous community through education and health initiatives, and to sport.
- Associate Professor Rhonda Muriel Faragher – For distinguished service to people with Down Syndrome through research programs and education initiatives.
- Michael John Fuller, APM – For distinguished service to law enforcement as Commissioner of Police in New South Wales, and to criminal intelligence governance.
- Robin Charles Gehling – For distinguished service to the maritime transport and safety industries, and to naval architecture.
- Professor Emeritus Mary-Jane Gething – For distinguished service to biochemistry and molecular biology, to tertiary education, and to the arts.
- The Honourable Prudence Jane Goward – For distinguished service to the people and Parliament of New South Wales, and to women's affairs.
- Dr Francis Gerard Gurry – For distinguished service to intellectual property law and research, and to tertiary education.
- Jane Hemstritch – For distinguished service to the community through medical research administration, the arts, and business roles.
- Gregory James Hood – For distinguished service to the national transportation and aviation industries, and to the not-for-profit sector.
- Professor David Arthur Hume – For distinguished service to biological science, particularly molecular biology, and to tertiary education.
- Peter Andrew Jennings, PSM – For distinguished service to the development of strategic and international policy, and to public affairs.
- Christopher Richard Johnson, AM – For distinguished service to urban design and architecture, to planning reform and compliance, and to the community.
- Merran Horne Kelsall – For distinguished service to the financial accounting sector, to professional organisations, and to the community.
- Dame Carol Anne Kidu, DBE – For distinguished service to human rights, to community development, and to international relations.
- Professor Susan Elizabeth Kurrle – For distinguished service to medicine as a geriatrician, and to research into dementia and cognitive function.
- The Honourable Emilios John Kyrou – For distinguished service to the judiciary and to the law, to professional associations, and to the community.
- Emeritus Professor Jane Latimer – For distinguished service to tertiary education and research, particularly public health, and to women.
- Distinguished Professor Jie Lu – For distinguished service to engineering and computer science, particularly through the research and development of artificial intelligence.
- Emeritus Professor Robert Michael Manne – For distinguished service to tertiary education, to political and social commentary, to public affairs, and to the Indigenous community.
- Emeritus Professor Jill Patricia McKeough – For distinguished service to intellectual property law, to tertiary education, to law reform, and to professional organisations.
- Emeritus Professor Alexander (Jack) John McLean – For distinguished service to road safety research, particularly to the causes and prevention of motor vehicle accidents.
- Thomas Michael Mollenkopf – For distinguished service to business, particularly through the essential services industry, and to the community.
- Dr Robert Victor Morgan – For distinguished service to the Indigenous community, to tertiary education leadership, and in health advisory roles.
- William Mortimer Muirhead, AM – For distinguished service to the business sector, to the community of South Australia, and to international relations.
- Phillip Roger Noyce – For distinguished service to the arts as a film and television director, producer, and screenwriter.
- The late Professor George Christopher Patton – For distinguished service to psychiatry and developmental epidemiology, to youth health and wellbeing, and to mental health research.
- Andrew Penn – For distinguished service to business, to charitable organisations, to youth, and to the arts.
- Dr Anthony James Press – For distinguished service to the environment, particularly to the preservation of the Antarctic and Kakadu.
- Emeritus Professor Ian Malcolm Ramsay – For distinguished service to the law, to regulatory bodies, to tertiary education, and to law reform.
- Professor Alexander John Smits – For distinguished service to aerospace engineering, particularly in the field of fluid dynamics, and to tertiary education.
- Emeritus Professor Bruce John Tonge – For distinguished service to psychiatric medicine and research, to tertiary education, to youth, and to the community.
- Dr Anne Louise Tonkin – For distinguished service to medical professional regulation, to tertiary education, and to clinical pharmacology.
- Dr Helen Kay Tope – For distinguished service to environmental protection, particularly of the ozone layer, through leadership, research and policy development.
- Scott Williams, AM – For distinguished service to business, to tertiary education, and through philanthropic contributions.
- Professor Heddy Zola – For distinguished service to medical research, particularly immunology and immunopathology, and to professional associations.

==== Military Division ====
Navy

- Rear Admiral Peter Michael Quinn, AM, CSC, RAN – For distinguished service to the Royal Australian Navy and the Australian Department of Defence.

Army

- Lieutenant General John James Frewen, DSC, AM – For distinguished service as Commander Defence COVID-19 Task Force and Coordinator General of the National COVID-19 Vaccine Task Force.

=== Member of the Order of Australia (AM) ===
==== General Division ====
- Edward Anthony Adair – For significant service to arts administration and philanthropic endeavours.
- Frederick Eyitayo Alale – For significant service to the African communities of Victoria.
- Harold James Allie, BEM – For significant service to veterans, to Indigenous organisations, and to the community.
- Dr John Francis Angus – For significant service to the agricultural sector through research roles, and to education.
- Dr James Harrison Aylward – For significant service to biomedical research, and commercialisation.
- Lucinda Jane Barry – For significant service to public health policy in executive roles, and to medicine.
- Emeritus Professor Linda Mary Barwick – For significant service to the preservation and digitisation of cultural heritage recordings.
- Anthony Bastic – For significant service to the special events industry.
- Dr Sonya Maree Bennett – For significant service to public health in leadership roles.
- Emeritus Professor Claude Charles Bernard – For significant service to medical research, and to education.
- Sir Michael David Bishop, CBE – For significant service to the not-for-profit sector through philanthropic support.
- Robert Terry Blamey – For significant service to management in the music industry.
- Professor Robert Brander – For significant service to coastal science, and to the community, through beach safety research and education.
- Dr Judith Margaret Brett – For significant service to education and public debate, particularly in social science and politics.
- The Honourable Clive Morris Brown – For significant service to the Parliament of Western Australia, and to industrial relations.
- Juliet Helena Brown, OAM – For significant service to the insurance and superannuation industries.
- Peter Brown – For significant service to community social welfare organisations.
- Warren Lindsay Brown – For significant service to media as a cartoonist, and to military history.
- Dr Alan Douglas Bryan – For significant service to paediatric medicine.
- Dr Sally Lee Bryant – For significant service to wildlife and land conservation in Tasmania.
- Dr Therese Burke – For significant service to medicine, particularly to multiple sclerosis research, and to nursing.
- Professor Jennifer Mary Burn – For significant service to the law in the field of anti-slavery and migration.
- Dr Elizabeth Ann Byrski – For significant service to tertiary education, and to literature.
- Michael Anthony Cassel – For significant service to theatre production.
- Professor Clara Kayei Chow – For significant service to medicine as a cardiologist, and to research.
- Dr Elizabeth Ann Coates – For significant service to special needs dentistry, and to oral health care.
- Jennifer Elizabeth Collins – For significant service to veterans and their families, and to nursing.
- Emeritus Professor Jillianne Leigh Cook – For significant service to physiotherapy, and to sports medicine.
- Stephen Paul Cornelissen – For significant service to community health, and to basketball.
- Dr Thomas Wells Cottee – For significant service to obstetrics and gynaecology.
- Annette Mary Court – For significant service to golf administration, and to the community.
- Dr Theresa Marie Craig – For significant service to politics, and to the agriculture industry.
- Susan Dorothy Crow – For significant service to sports administration.
- Dr Anthony Bernard Cull – For significant service to medical administration, and to community health.
- Margaret Merilyn Cunningham – For significant service to the community through charitable organisations.
- Chloe Bennett Dallimore – For significant service to the performing arts, particularly as a performer.
- The late Christopher Davis – For significant service to water management.
- Dr Paula Dawson – For significant service to the visual arts, and to research in holographic technology.
- Associate Professor John Walton Dearin – For significant service to medicine, and to community health in Lithgow.
- Professor Martin Delatycki – For significant service to medicine, to genetic research, and to education.
- Dr Jennifer Flavia Delima – For significant service to rural and remote medicine.
- Dr David Hope Denton, RFD, KC – For significant service to the law.
- Rosemary Gai Derwin – For significant service to youth through Girl Guides, and to the community.
- Dr Marcia Devlin – For significant service to higher education, and to women.
- Dr Geoffrey John Dobb – For significant service to intensive care medicine, and to professional associations.
- Lynda Dorrington – For significant service to art administration.
- Associate Professor Peter Andrew Downie – For significant service to paediatric oncology, to teaching, and to research.
- Belinda Duarte – For significant service to the Indigenous community, and to sports administration.
- Emeritus Professor Stephen John Duckett – For significant service to public health policy and management, and to tertiary education.
- Professor Patricia Lynette Dudgeon – For significant service to Indigenous mental health and wellbeing, and to education.
- Nancy Rae Dwyer – For significant service to netball in New South Wales.
- Bronwen Edwards – For significant service to mental health and suicide prevention.
- Helen Germein Edwards – For significant service to the tourism industry in South Australia.
- Walter John Edwards – For significant service to cricket administration.
- Richard James Evans – For significant service to performing arts administration.
- Dr Annabelle Farnsworth – For significant service to medicine, and to women's health.
- Dr Kirstin Irene Ferguson – For significant service to business, and to gender equality.
- Professor Elizabeth Fernandez – For significant service to education, to social justice, and to professional associations.
- Professor Gemma Alexandra Figtree – For significant service to medicine in the field of cardiology.
- The Honourable Professor Verity Firth – For significant service to the Parliament of New South Wales, and to social inclusion.
- Dominique Gayle Fisher – For significant service in a range of roles and organisations.
- Patrick Joseph Flannigan – For significant service to sports administration, and to corporate governance.
- Anne Ferguson Flint – For significant service to education, and to those with disability.
- Professor Maralyn Foureur – For significant service to nursing in the field of midwifery.
- Jane Elizabeth Freudenstein – For significant service to adolescent health, and to the arts.
- Elisabetta Maria Giannini – For significant service to architecture, and to the arts.
- Professor Lorraine Graham – For significant service to education, particularly in the field of inclusive learning.
- The late Stephen Edward Gregg – For significant service to the Queensland tourism industry in leadership roles.
- Dr Trina Gregory – For significant service to general practice medicine.
- Distinguished Professor Lyn Robyn Griffiths – For significant service to genetics, and to research into neurological disorders.
- Geraldine Marcia Harwood – For significant service to youth, and to the disability sector.
- Her Honour Judge Kate Isabella Hawkins – For significant service to the law, and to judicial education.
- Professor Emeritus Debra Claire Henly – For significant service to education administration, and to science.
- Professor David Alan Hensher – For significant service to transport, and to supply chain management.
- Timothy John Hess – For significant service to aquaculture, and to the community of Tasmania.
- Emeritus Professor Jennifer Jane Hocking – For significant service to the preservation of Australian political history.
- Sylvia Hoffman – For significant service to the Jewish community.
- Victor Patrick Hoog Antink – For significant service to the property industry, and to corporate governance.
- Emeritus Professor Richard Lionel Howitt – For significant service to education, and to the Indigenous community.
- Catherine Elizabeth Hunt – For significant service to the arts and cultural sector, and to women.
- Susan Jane Hunt, PSM – For significant service to animal welfare, and to public administration.
- Suzanne Jennifer Hunt – For significant service to the arts, particularly live performance, and to community health.
- Dr Betsy Rivers Jackes – For significant service to botany, to conservation, and to tertiary education.
- John Jarrett – For significant service to community health, and to veterans and their families.
- Peter Moreton Johnson – For service to conservation and the environment, particularly to macropods.
- Professor Brian Kelly – For significant service to medical education, and to professional organisations.
- The late Dr Gregory John Kesby – For significant service to obstetrics and gynaecology, and to professional organisations.
- Carol Annie Kiefer – For significant service to the community, and to women.
- Conjoint Professor Edwin Philip Kirk – For significant service to genetic pathology and clinical genetics, and to medical research.
- Professor Kiaran Kirk – For significant service to science education and research, and to professional organisations.
- Jean Kittson – For significant service to the arts as a performer, writer and comedian.
- Dr Melvyn Gabriel Korman – For significant service to gastroenterological and hepatological medicine.
- Dr Robin Jana Kramar – For significant service to education in the field of human resource management.
- Kylie Jane Kwong – For significant service to the hospitality industry, and to the community.
- Philip Archibald Law – For significant service to the community through a range of humanitarian organisations.
- Dr Mark David Leedham – For significant service to dental medicine, and to professional organisations.
- Dr Michael David Levitt – For significant service to medical administration, and to professional associations.
- Rodney Selwyn Lewis – For significant service to the law, to business, and to the community.
- Clinical Professor Graham John Lieschke – For significant service to medicine as a haematologist, and to medical research.
- Dr Stephen Locarnini – For significant service to medicine as a virologist, and to medical research.
- Dr Elizabeth Anne Lording – For significant service to medicine, particularly to Multiple Sclerosis rehabilitation and research.
- Dr Sadhana Mahajani – For significant service to aged care, and to community health.
- Dr Donald John Markwell – For significant service to education in a range of roles.
- Paul Kenneth Maytom – For significant service to local government, and to the community of Leeton.
- Dr Stuart Russell McGill – For significant service to the mining and resources sector, and to business.
- Emeritus Professor Paul Gerard McMenamin – For significant service to tertiary medical education.
- Sarah Merridew – For significant service to corporate governance, and to the Tasmanian community.
- Leanne Miller – For significant service to women's affairs, and to the Indigenous community.
- Professor Helen Milroy – For significant service to public health, and to the Indigenous community.
- The late John Bruce Moxon – For significant service to community health, and to people with physical disability.
- The late Reverend Neville Muir – For significant service to the deaf community, and to international Christian ministry.
- Joanne Emily Muller – For significant service to youth, to community health, and to the law.
- Dr Heather Rose Nancarrow – For significant service to education, and to the safety of women.
- Dr Leslie Karl Nathanson – For significant service to medicine as a gastrointestinal and laparoscopic surgeon.
- Emeritus Professor Pauline Anne Nestor – For significant service to tertiary education and research.
- The late Emeritus Professor Peter John Noonan – For significant service to education in a range of roles.
- Emeritus Professor Barry Nurcombe – For significant service to medicine as a psychiatrist, and to tertiary education.
- Dr Lisa Joy O'Brien – For significant service to the community, particularly through social welfare organisations.
- Dr Elaine Ong – For significant service to veterinary medicine, and to animal welfare and rescue.
- Bruna Papandrea – For significant service to the performing arts as a film and television producer.
- Emeritus Professor John Stewart Pate – For significant service to botany, and to tertiary education.
- Mary Patetsos – For significant service to multicultural affairs, and to aged care through board positions.
- Susan Pearce – For significant service to public health administration and governance.
- Dr Neil John Peppitt – For significant service to dentistry, and to tertiary education.
- Professor Anna Poidevin (De Fazio) – For significant service to medicine, particularly cancer research.
- David Polson – For significant service to community health through HIV education and advocacy roles.
- Dr Michelle Anne Potter – For significant service to the performing arts in a range of roles.
- Barry Ewen Presgrave, OAM – For significant service to veterans, and to emergency service organisations.
- Bess Nungarrayi Price – For significant service to the Parliament of the Northern Territory, and to the Indigenous community.
- Dr Timothy William Proudman – For significant service to plastic and reconstructive surgery, and to professional organisations.
- Emeritus Professor Ian Bruce Puddey – For significant service to medical education, research and administration.
- Professor Gail Petuna Risbridger – For significant service to medical research and administration, and to education.
- Dr Amanda Rischbieth – For significant service to public health administration and governance.
- Ian Henry Riseley, OAM – For significant service to Rotary International in executive roles.
- Angela Fleur Ryder – For significant service to the Aboriginal communities of Western Australia.
- The Venerable Canon Professor Peter Sandeman – For significant service to the Anglican Church of Australia, and to the community of South Australia.
- Jennifer Scott – For significant service to the community through a range of organisations.
- Stephen John Scudamore – For significant service to business and commerce, and to the mining and resources sector.
- Mary Seefried – For significant service to equestrian sports.
- Robbie Sefton – For significant service to agribusiness, and to the community in a range of roles.
- Dr Roger Sexton – For significant service to medical practitioners through health initiatives, and to professional associations.
- Dr Gary Allen Shiels – For significant service to town planning, and to the community.
- John Priestley Simpson – For significant service to the business sector, to education, and to the community.
- Judge Rauf Soulio – For significant service to multicultural affairs, to the judiciary, and to the community.
- Professor Barbara Spears – For significant service to tertiary education, to research, and to youth.
- Professor Emerita Diane Priscilla Speed – For significant service to tertiary education, and to the Anglican Church of Australia.
- Michael Ernest Stafford-Bennett – For significant service to the refrigeration industry, and to the environment.
- Professor Katharine Shirley Steinbeck – For significant service to adolescent medicine through a range of roles.
- The Honourable Eadley Graeme Stoney – For significant service to the community, and to the Parliament of Victoria.
- Professor Edward Strivens, PSM – For significant service to geriatric medicine, and to professional organisations.
- Kristin Stubbins – For significant service to the financial sector, to women, and to the community.
- John Stubbs – For significant service to community health, particularly to people with cancer.
- Dr Norman Gabriel Swan – For significant service to the broadcast media as a science and health commentator.
- The Honourable Pamela Mary Tate, KC – For significant service to the judiciary, to the law, and to legal education.
- Dr Michael Tedeschi – For significant service to medicine, particularly to people with drug and alcohol dependency.
- David Charles Templeman – For significant service to community health administration and governance.
- Professor Bruce Robert Thompson – For significant service to respiratory medicine, and to tertiary medical education.
- Professor Emeritus John Alexander Thomson – For significant service to botanical science and research, and to tertiary education.
- Dr Sally Jean Torr – For significant service to healthcare administration, and to the community of western New South Wales.
- Paul Laurence Tunzi – For significant service to music as a pianoforte technician, and to professional associations.
- Professor Andrew Turnell – For significant service to the protection of children through social welfare initiatives.
- Nicola Wakefield Evans – For significant service to business, to the law, and to diversity.
- Professor Kerry Brian Walsh – For significant service to horticultural science, and to tertiary education.
- Michael John Walsh – For significant service to the Anglican Church of Australia, and to the community of Tasmania.
- Jeanette Hazel Ward – For significant service to the community through a range of organisations.
- Margaret Maddern Webb, OAM – For significant service to education governance, to Indigenous students, and as a mentor.
- Marion Jane Webster, OAM – For significant service to the community, to the philanthropic sector, and to women.
- David Wenham – For significant service to the performing arts as an actor and producer.
- Deborah Lee Willcox – For significant service to health administration, and to the community.
- Philip Stretton Williams – For significant service to the broadcast media as a presenter and journalist.
- Dalene Wray – For significant service to the organic beef industry, and to professional organisations.
- Harilaos Xydas – For significant service to the building and construction industry.
- Dr Alfred John Zerfas – For significant service to international community health and nutrition as an epidemiologist.
- Emeritus Professor Jenny Ziviani – For significant service to occupational therapy, and to medical tertiary education.

==== Military Division ====
Navy

- Commander Debbie Ann Butterworth, OAM, CSM and Bar, RAN – For exceptional service to the Royal Australian Navy in the field of Navy People leadership and management.
- Rear Admiral Stephen John Hughes, CSC, RAN – For exceptional service to the Australian Defence Force in senior Command and staff roles.
- Captain James Richard Levay, RAN – For exceptional service in the field of career management and leadership development of Navy People.
- Rear Admiral Nigel Antony Perry, CSC, RAN (Retd) – For exceptional service to the Royal Australian Navy in senior command and management roles.
- Rear Admiral Christopher Erson Smith, CSM, RAN – For exceptional service to the Royal Australian Navy in senior command and management roles.

Army

- Brigadier Kahlil Scarf Fegan, DSC – For exceptional service in the Australian Army as Chief of Staff Army Headquarters and Commander 3rd Brigade.
- Brigadier David John Kelly, CSC, DSM – For exceptional service as Chief of Staff Army Headquarters, Divisional Chief Trans-regional Threats Coordination Cell, Plans Branch, United States Joint Chiefs of Staff, and Director of Workforce Strategy – Army.
- Lieutenant Colonel Glyn David Llanwarne, OAM – For exceptional service to the Australian Defence Force in the field of sensitive and strategic personnel case management.
- Brigadier Gregory Robert Novak – For exceptional service in command and liaison appointments for the Australian Defence Force.
- Colonel Leonard Oei – For exceptional service to the Australian Army as Director of Military Arts, Royal Military College and Joint Logistics Command as the Chief of Staff.
- Brigadier Craig Donald Shortt, DSC, CSC, DSM – For exceptional service as Director General Land, Director General Career Management Army and Commander Special Forces Group.

Air Force

- Wing Commander Kerry Ann Hollings – For exceptional service in major international engagement, strategic recruitment development, and Professional Military Education reform for the Australian Defence Force.
- Warrant Officer Brett Andrew Hooper, OAM – For exceptional service throughout the introduction of P8-A Poseidon Maritime Patrol aircraft, and the EA-18G Growler Airborne Electronic Attack capability for the Australian Defence Force.
- Air Commodore David John Paddison, CSC – For exceptional performance of duty as the Commander Joint Task Force 633 on Operation ACCORDION from July to December 2021.
- Wing Commander Mark Gregory Pentreath, CSM – For exceptional service to the Australian Defence Force in organisational reform and change management.
- Warrant Officer Dean Anthony Rhodes – For exceptional service in Air Movements development for the Royal Australian Air Force.
- Group Captain Catherine Mary Williams – For exceptional service as Lead Defence Coordinator for the Australian International Airshow and Operations and Command responsibilities from 2009 to 2022.

==== Honorary ====
- Mitu Bhowmick Lange – For significant service to the performing arts through film.
- Professor Michelle Leech – For significant service to medical education, and to professional organisations.
- Mary Ann Lyttle – For significant service to aged care, and to community health.

=== Medal of the Order of Australia (OAM) ===
==== General Division ====
- Professor Sylvester Abanteriba – For service to education, and to engineering.
- Chantal Marie-Rose Abouchar – For service to business, and to the media.
- Donald Aitken – For service to the community through charitable organisations.
- The late Leo Brian Akee – For service to the community through a range of roles.
- The late Ernest Thomas Alchin – For service to the community through a range of organisations.
- Ingrid Alderton – For service to special education.
- Veronica Aldridge – For service to the arts.
- Christine Anne Allbeury – For service to conservation and the environment.
- Geoffrey Roy Ambler – For service to the community of Salisbury.
- Robert Frederick Badham – For service to the community through a range of organisations.
- Barbara Marilyn Baikie – For service to women's affairs, and to the community.
- Christine Mary Bailey – For service to music and theatre organisations.
- Timothy Robert Bailey – For service to mechanical engineering.
- Annette Maree Baker – For service to community health.
- Stuart John Baker – For service to the community of the Albury-Wodonga region.
- Glenn Lloyd Ball – For service to the community through a range of roles.
- Yanyi Bandicha – For service to the Indigenous communities of the Northern Territory and South Australia.
- Inaam Barakat – For service to the multicultural communities of Victoria.
- Michael Nathan Barnett – For service to the LGBTQI community.
- Robert Barrett – For service to the community of the Southern Highlands.
- Ronald Norman Bassan – For service to the community through a range of organisations.
- Deborah Ann Beck – For service to the arts.
- Elizabeth Evizel Beischer – For service to the community of Toorak.
- The late Colin Morton Bell – For service to the financial services sector.
- Margaret Bennett – For service to medical administration.
- Dr Jeanette Gai Berman – For service to education.
- Diane Elizabeth Bilka – For service to nursing.
- Dr Kristin Bindley – For service to the community through palliative care initiatives.
- Dr Susan Audrey Blinkhorn – For service to medicine as a psychiatrist.
- Eileen Kamara Bonney – For service to the Indigenous community of Ampilatwatja.
- George Alexander Booth – For service to the community, and to tourism.
- Michelle Bordignon – For service to social welfare.
- Emmanuel (Bill) Borg – For service to rugby league.
- Karyn Elizabeth Borg – For service to junior rugby league.
- Gregory Kenneth Bowman – For service to the tourism and hospitality industry.
- The late Peter Bowman – For service to sports administration.
- Judge Christopher John Bowrey – For service to the law, and to the community.
- Brother Anthony Paul Boyd – For service to secondary education.
- Jane Elizabeth Boyd – For service to the community through early childhood music education.
- Howard Phillip Branson – For service to the community of West Adelaide.
- Valentina Brjozovsky – For service to the Russian community of Victoria.
- Christine Lynette Brooke – For service to the environment, and to the community.
- Susan Hilary Brookhouse – For service to wildlife care and rehabilitation.
- Heather Ruth Brown – For service to the community through a range of organisations.
- Jeanette Brown – For service to the performing arts.
- June Frances Brown – For service to the creative arts.
- Harvey Bruce – For service to the Jewish community of Victoria.
- Helen Bryan – For service to the community of Great Lakes.
- Paul Robert Bryant – For service to veterans and their families.
- Thomas Maxwell Buchanan – For service to music, particularly through choirs.
- Laura Carol Bunyan – For service to community history.
- Mary Lorna Burgess – For service to the community through charitable organisations.
- Peter Clifford Burns – For service to the community, and to youth.
- Raymond Peter Butterfield – For service to the community through a range of organisations.
- Jennifer Jayne Butters – For service to the community through charitable organisations.
- Geraldine Frances Byrne – For service to the community of Western Australia, and to history.
- Colin McLaurin Cameron – For service to the broadcast media, and to the community.
- The late Dr Donald James Cameron – For service to paediatric gastroenterology.
- Colin Eric Campbell – For service to the community through musical groups.
- Pamela Mavis Campbell – For service to the community of Kyogle.
- Thomas Preston Campbell – For service to Indigenous youth, and to rugby league.
- Alexandrea Cannon – For service to business.
- David Ian Carmen – For service to the community through a range of roles.
- Deidre Marea Carroll – For service to the community of the Grenfell region.
- Terry Edward Carroll – For service to the community of the Grenfell region.
- Maura Cato – For service to the community through charitable organisations.
- Nicola Cerrone – For service to the jewellery industry, and to the community.
- Janice Lesley Challinor – For service to the community of Glebe.
- Helen Patricia Chamberlin – For service to literature as a publisher.
- Dr Ernest Yinson Chan – For service to the community, and to dentistry.
- Nicholas Chapley – For service to the community through charitable organisations.
- Angela Ruth Chaplin – For service to the performing arts.
- Dr Bernard John Chapman – For service to community health.
- Richard Clement Chapman – For service to the marine export industry.
- Dr Shailja Chaturvedi – For service to medicine, and to the community.
- Kristy Chong – For service to business, and to charitable organisations.
- Ronald Leslie Christie – For service to veterans.
- Peter Ciani – For service to music, particularly as a singer and songwriter.
- Hendrikus Cornelus Claassen – For service to veterans.
- Christine Clark – For service to primary and secondary education.
- Leanne Maree Clarke – For service to community health.
- Lindsay Clifford Clarke – For service to the community through a range of organisations.
- Kevin James Clifton – For service to the community of Tamworth.
- Angela Coble – For service to business.
- Phillip Vincent Coleman – For service to the community through the Catholic Church, and to the club industry.
- Reginald Victor Collard – For service to the community through a range of organisations.
- Donald David Collins – For service to the community of Woomelang.
- Kathleen Joanne Comb – For service to the community of Hornsby Ku-ring-gai.
- Sister Mary Therese Comer – For service to the community.
- Julie Roslyn Commins – For service to the community through a range of roles.
- Dr Raymond John Cook – For service to medicine as a neurosurgeon.
- The late Neville Allan Cordes – For service to the community of Kangaroo Island.
- Jill Costello – For service to community health.
- Macaulay Cottrell DFC – For service to veterans and their families.
- Gayle Linford Cowan – For service to the community of Mount Gambier.
- Robert Cowan – For service to the community of Mount Gambier.
- Dr John Warwick Cox – For service to medicine as a paediatrician.
- Anne Patricia Craig – For service to the performing arts.
- Karen Craigie – For service to children.
- Janet Berice Craik – For service to the community.
- Dr Roslyn Allayne Crampton – For service to medical administration.
- Paul Allan Crate – For service to Australian rules football.
- Susan Elizabeth Croft – For service to community health as a physiotherapist.
- Bronwyn Crosby – For service to community health.
- David Sutton Crow – For service to cricket.
- Rosemary Curtis – For service to the Indigenous community of Glen Innes.
- Wendy Marea Cutting – For service to the tourism and hospitality industry.
- Susan Jennifer Dadswell – For service to the museums and galleries sector.
- John Andrew Darley – For service to the Parliament of South Australia.
- Gregory John Davies – For service to youth through Scouts.
- Diarmid Charles Davine – For service to the law.
- Aileen Esme Davis – For service to people with disability.
- Edward Charles Davis – For service to the community of Mooroopna.
- Julie De Hennin – For service to the community of northern Victoria.
- Phil De Young – For service to independent school education.
- Henry James Delaney – For service to the community through a range of organisations.
- Carmelo Desira – For service to the community through charitable organisations.
- Flora Josephine Deverall – For service to the community through a range of roles.
- Margaret Dewberry – For service to people who are deaf or hard of hearing.
- Laurence Wayne Dixon – For service to horticulture.
- Brian Leonard Doherty – For service to the community through a range of organisations.
- Jacqueline Dominish – For service to health administration.
- Ashley Donaldson – For service to basketball.
- Lynette Ethel Doppler – For service to education, and to the community.
- Christine Anne Doubleday – For service to athletics.
- Peter Reginald Dougherty – For service to the community of the Grafton region.
- Justin Dowel – For service to the community through philanthropy.
- Terence Dowel – For service to the community through philanthropy.
- Dianne Ruth Dowling – For service to community history.
- Dr Peter John Dowling – For service to community history.
- Dr Barry James Dowty – For service to medicine in a range of roles.
- Elizabeth Drozd – For service to the Polish and multicultural communities of Victoria.
- Keith Duggan – For service to the community in a range of roles.
- Timothy Shaun Duggan – For service to youth, and to sport.
- Robert Bruce Duncan – For service to rowing.
- Russell Ernest Duncan – For service to the community through not-for-profit organisations.
- Sally Frances Duncan – For service to basketball, and to people with disability.
- Dorothy Mavis Ebbott – For service to history preservation organisations.
- Pamela Elvie Ellerman – For service to the community of Deniliquin.
- Patricia Ann Ellis – For service to the Indigenous community of the Eurobodalla Shire.
- The late Geoffrey Mcniel Ellison – For service to the community through a range of organisations.
- Dr Ernest Patrick Evans – For service to engineering.
- Stefanie Gun-Britt Evans – For service to community health.
- Joan Evelyn – For service to tennis.
- Elizabeth Exintaris – For service to the community, particularly through music.
- Barry Mervyn Ezzy – For service to surf lifesaving.
- Garry Fabian – For service to the community through a range of organisations.
- Adrian Factor – For service to the Jewish community, and to music.
- Dr Lisa Fahey – For service to medicine as a psychologist.
- Alan Roy Farmer – For service to community health.
- Jill Elisabeth Fenwick – For service to community history preservation.
- Eileen Joyce Ferguson – For service to croquet.
- Patricia Fiske – For service to the film industry.
- Michael John Fogarty – For service to veterans and their families.
- Sarah Elizabeth Foley – For service to community health.
- Geoffrey Charles Forshaw – For service to surf lifesaving.
- Keith John Fowler – For service to veterans and their families.
- Roger Allan Foy – For service to automotive history.
- Gillian Kathleen Francis – For service to community history.
- Ronald James Frederick – For service to orienteering and rogaining.
- Richard John French – For service to the community of Muswellbrook.
- Judith Ann Fyfe – For service to the community, particularly to youth.
- Joseph Alexander Galea – For service to the Maltese community of New South Wales.
- Dr Richard Gallagher – For service to medicine as a surgeon.
- Dr Charlotte Kendrick Galloway – For service to education, and to history.
- David John Gandolfo – For service to the financial sector.
- Betty Vera Gardiner – For service to veterans and their families.
- Trisha Gardiner-Wilson – For service to the community through a charitable organisation.
- Dr Allan Warren Garrett – For service to the community of the Wangaratta region.
- Jean Margaret Gilbert – For service to the community through a range of organisations.
- Margaret Lavina Giulieri – For service to the community, particularly to youth.
- Fiona Louise Godfrey – For service to primary and secondary education.
- Dr Hugo Gold – For service to medicine.
- Dr Denise Anne Goodwin – For service to the community through a range of organisations.
- Susan Catherine Gordon – For service to the community of Young.
- Trevor John Gordon – For service to the community through a range of organisations.
- Professor Emerita Annette Elizabeth Gough – For service to tertiary and environmental education.
- Carmel Lynette Gould – For service to Australian rules football.
- Daryl James Gould – For service to Australian rules football.
- Lorenda Gracey – For service to education.
- William Granger – For service to the tourism and hospitality sector.
- Dr Debra Jane Graves – For service to medical administration, particularly to pathology.
- Henry Gray – For service to education.
- Kerrie Gray – For service to the community of the Northern Rivers.
- Melvin Douglas Gray – For service to the community of Blacktown.
- Sarah Jane Gray – For service to community health.
- David Thomas Greenall – For service to the community through a range of organisations.
- Philip Andrew Greenwood – For service to the not-for-profit sector, and to the community.
- Kerrie Griffin – For service to community health.
- Samantha Jane Griffin – For service to the community through a range of organisations.
- Nikki Griffiths – For service to local business, and to the community.
- Leonard George Gross – For service to the community through a range of roles.
- Sandra Lee Grove – For service to the community of Kogarah.
- Giles Gunesekera – For service to social welfare, and to the community.
- Maureen Lavinia Hafey – For service to the community through charitable organisations.
- Ian Garry Hall – For service to veterans and their families.
- Winsome Hazel Hall – For service to the community through a range of roles.
- Rodney Turner Halstead – For service to the community through a range of roles.
- Gail Hanigan – For service to the community of Young.
- Judith Hanlon – For service to the communities of Euroa and Shepparton.
- Clinical Associate Professor Edwin Harari – For service to medicine as a psychiatrist.
- Michelle Karen Harper – For service to horse sports.
- Linda Adele Harris – For service to the community of the Fraser Coast.
- John Alfred Harvey – For service to the community of Mareeba.
- Gifford Ernest Hatfield – For service to youth through Scouts, and to the community.
- Graeme Arthur Haussmann – For service to engineering, and to the community.
- Ivo John Havard – For service to cricket and football.
- Dorothy Haynes – For service to the community of Doncaster.
- Brian Joseph Heenan – For service to community sport.
- Rae Mervene Heenan – For service to community sport.
- Professor Chyrisse Heine – For service to speech pathology.
- Sally Herman – For service to the financial sector, and to the community.
- Alan Roy Hill – For service to conservation and the environment.
- Barry Keith Hill – For service to the performing arts.
- James Charles Hill – For service to the community of Cairns.
- Stephen David Hill – For service to the skateboarding industry.
- Geoffrey Stephan Hobart – For service to the community through a range of roles.
- John David Hodgson – For service to the visual arts, particularly to photography.
- Lieutenant Colonel Christopher John Holcroft, RFD (Retd) – For service to youth, and to the community.
- Thomas John Holden – For service to the community of the Sunshine Coast.
- Noel Desmond Holdsworth – For service to the community of Bridgetown.
- Dr Philip Robert Holmes – For service to the livestock industry.
- Anne Louise Hooker – For service to the community, particularly to youth.
- Clare Hopley – For service to children who are hard of hearing, and to education.
- Warren Hopley – For service to education, particularly to the disadvantaged.
- Anne Horne – For service to school sports.
- The late Nazminali Hudda – For service to the Nizari Ismaili Muslim community of Queensland.
- Janet Hughes – For service to the community of Nowra.
- Jenny Marlene Hughes – For service to the community through a range of organisations.
- Dr Philip Hungerford – For service to emergency medicine.
- Kevin John Hunter – For service to veterans.
- Joseph Henry Hutchinson – For service to aeromodelling.
- John Martin Hyde – For service to the community through a range of roles.
- Bozena Iwanowski – For service to the Polish community of Victoria.
- Vicki Jackson – For service to the law, and to the community.
- Gwendalyn Mary Jacobsen – For service to the community through a range of organisations.
- Dennis Richard Jarman – For service to the communities of Elizabeth and Playford.
- Sarah Jefford – For service to the law.
- Dennis Phillip Jetta – For service to the Indigenous communities of the Bunbury region.
- Christopher John Johnson – For service to community health.
- Rebecca Johnson – For service to the Indigenous and LGBTQI communities.
- Tanya Johnson – For service to the community through charitable organisations.
- Alan Graham Johnstone – For service to the community through charitable organisations.
- Colin Blakeway Jones – For service to the community of the Berrigan Shire.
- Dr Sten Roger Kalla – For service to the Swedish community of Melbourne.
- Emanuel George Kallinicos – For service to the Greek community of Queensland.
- Claudia Karvan – For service to the film and television industry.
- Margaret Ellenor Kearin – For service to the community through a range of organisations.
- Barry Lawrence Keleher – For service to the community, particularly to youth.
- Brian Martin Kelly – For service to the community of Tocumwal.
- Doris May Kelly – For service to netball in the Bankstown region.
- Marie Anne Kelly – For service to netball, and to education.
- Dr Coral Kemp – For service to special needs education.
- Andrew Ross Kendall – For service to the community through a range of organisations.
- Dean Russell Kerley – For service to the community of Loxton Waikerie.
- Peter Richard Kierath – For service to the community of Narromine.
- Robert John King – For service to the community of Nuriootpa.
- Belinda Rose Knierim (Mason) – For service to the arts, and to human rights.
- Lesley Kool – For service to palaeontology.
- Alice Lai – For service to the Chinese community of Victoria.
- Kenneth William Lamb – For service to the community of Roxby Downs.
- Valerie Patrena Lamb – For service to the community of Roxby Downs.
- Gordon Bruce Lang – For service to archery.
- Maureen (Mandy) Langdon – For service to nursing.
- Donald Charles Lawie – For service to the community of the Cairns region.
- John Lambert Lawrence – For service to the community through charitable organisations.
- Herbert William Layt – For service to the community through a range of organisations.
- Gary Lee – For service to the community through a range of organisations.
- Julie Lee – For service to the community through a range of organisations.
- Marie Anne Lee – For service to the community through charitable organisations.
- Michael James Lee – For service to education.
- Barry Leech – For service to people with a disability.
- Jonathon Nigel Leek – For service to the law.
- Katherine Margaret Leeming – For service to adventure sports.
- Anton Jacob Leen – For service to conservation and the environment.
- Joy Leggo – For service to the community through a range of organisations.
- Ellen Josephine Leis – For service to the community of Bundaberg.
- Garry William Leo – For service to rugby league, and to the community.
- Robyn Leonard – For service to community health and medical research.
- Steve Liebmann – For service to the broadcast media as a journalist.
- James Vane Lindesay – For service to literature as a cartoonist, illustrator and writer.
- Dianne Vivien Lindsay-Simpson – For service to the performing arts as an entertainer.
- Julie Helene Loblinzk – For service to people with disability.
- Gail Lonnon – For service to the community of Avalon.
- Valmai Loomes – For service to athletics.
- Ellen Louie – For service to aged welfare.
- Dawn Lovett – For service to community health.
- John Leonard Lovett – For service to community health.
- Betty Joyce Lukas – For service to tennis.
- Eleanor Lydon – For service to the community through a range of organisations.
- Maureen Mabel Lyon – For service to the community through a range of organisations.
- Wilfred Macbeth – For service to the community through a range of roles.
- John Maxwell Mackenzie – For service to broadcast media.
- Joyce Mackey – For service to community history preservation.
- Karen Macleod – For service to swimming.
- Katherine Maka – For service to community health.
- Janice Pamela Mangleson – For service to the community through a range of organisations.
- Pauline Maniskas – For service to the community of the Central Coast.
- Kenneth Mansfield – For service to the community of Geelong.
- Sheila Mansfield – For service to the community of Geelong.
- Mary Corina Martin – For service to the law.
- Dr Sharon Lorraine Mascall-Dare – For service to media as a journalist.
- Deborah Masling – For service to secondary music education.
- Kent Mayo – For service to the community of Uralla.
- Brian George McBride – For service to the community of Buderim.
- Susan Jane McCallum – For service to veterans.
- John Albert McCarthy – For service to veterans.
- Mary Margaret McComish – For service to tertiary education, and to the community.
- Beverley Jean McCormack – For service to remote area nursing.
- Dr Ian Douglas McCrossin – For service to dermatology.
- Jennifer Lucille McDonald – For service to conservation and the environment.
- The late John Reid McDonald – For service to the community through a range of roles and organisations.
- The late Peter John McDonald – For service to rugby league.
- Gerard Joseph McGann – For service to the community through a range of roles.
- Sarah Anne McGoram – For service to community health.
- Gary John McKay, MC (Retd) – For service to military history, and to veterans.
- Mary Patricia McKendrick – For service to primary education.
- Deni McKenzie – For service to the communities of Armidale and Uralla.
- Dr Elizabeth Louise McNaughton – For service to medicine.
- Maree Anne McPherson – For service to the community through a range of organisations.
- Helen Mears – For service to community health.
- Timothy Gray Medhurst – For service to the community through a range of organisations.
- Jack Meister – For service to the Jewish community of Sydney.
- Alexander William Mercer – For service to golf.
- Elsma Merillo – For service to netball.
- Henry Meskauskas – For service to the community of Maitland.
- Moshe Meydan – For service to the community through charitable organisations.
- David Paul Michelson – For service to the Jewish community of Victoria.
- The late Patrick James Mildren – For service to veterans and their families.
- Alexander Donald Miller – For service to the community of Cowaramup.
- Yoko Mills – For service to nursing.
- Dr Darren Curtis Mitchell – For service to veterans.
- Dr Michael Charles Mitchelmore – For service to mathematics education, and to the community.
- Colin Mockett – For service to the arts, and to local history.
- Keryl Margaret Moir – For service to local government, and to the community of Darwin.
- Judith Dianne Monteith – For service to dancing.
- Dr Vernon Moo – For service to medicine as an anaesthetist.
- Allan Linden Moore – For service to international relations.
- The late Richard Douglas Moore – For service to music through pipe bands.
- The late Mervyn Gregory Moriarty – For service to the visual arts.
- Jeffrey Michael Morris – For service to financial sector accountability, and to local government.
- Julia Margaret Mosley – For service to youth through education support services.
- Maureen Mary Munce – For service to netball.
- Elvio Munzone – For service to the community through a range of roles.
- Selvarajah Muraledaran – For service to the Tamil community of Victoria.
- Elaine Therese Murphy – For service to education, and to the arts.
- Yasseen Musa – For service to the African community of Melbourne.
- Anthony Mylan – For service to the community, to youth, and to education.
- Emerita Professor Ngaire May Naffine – For service to the law, and to the legal profession.
- Elizabeth Nalder – For service to the community of Gilgandra.
- Jenifer Noelle Neary – For service to the community through a range of organisations.
- The late Elias George Nemer – For service to the Lebanese community of South Australia.
- Karen Elizabeth Neuendorf – For service to business, and to the community.
- Clint Newton – For service to rugby league.
- Sarah Jane Newton – For service to tertiary education, and to business.
- Long Viet Nguyen – For service to veterans.
- Lala Lanawati Noronha – For service to the community through charitable organisations.
- Gregory Clive Nothling – For service to the community through a range of roles.
- Monica O'Connor – For service to the community of Harden.
- Brian Joseph O'Malley – For service to the community through a range of organisations.
- Dr Susie O'Neill – For service to children.
- Narelle Judith O'Rourke – For service to the preservation of nursing history.
- Dr Joyleen Ann Ohazy – For service to the community, and to medicine.
- Dr Cathy Simone Oke – For service to local government, and to the environment.
- Peter Lawrence Ormsby – For service to drag racing.
- Geoffrey Donald Page – For service to literature as a poet.
- Dennis Thomas Palmer – For service to the community of Cootamundra-Gundagai.
- Ronald Clifford Palmer – For service to lawn bowls.
- Samuel Parker – For service to wrestling.
- Rickie John Paynter – For service to the community, particularly through the church.
- Robyn Joy Pearson-Robertson – For service to business.
- Justine Perkins – For service to the community through charitable organisations.
- David Pescud – For service to people with disability.
- Graeme Robert Pettigrew – For service to the community through a range of roles.
- Owen John Pezet – For service to soccer.
- Dr Ian Elvins Pfennigwerth – For service to military history.
- Margaret Phillips – For service to the community through a range of roles.
- Nicole Davina Phillips – For service to the community through a range of roles.
- Beverley Frances Pinder – For service to the community through a range of organisations.
- Sheryl Pitman – For service to the community of Howlong.
- Graeme Pitt – For service to the church, and to music.
- James Robert Porter – For service to the Parliament of Australia.
- Sorathy Pouk Michell – For service to the Khmer community of New South Wales.
- Barry Merton Purdon – For service to the community of Bathurst.
- Alethia Josephine Quick – For service to floral art organisations, and to the community.
- Susan Rae – For service to the promotion of international trade.
- Alan Michael Rankins – For service to business, and to engineering.
- Narmatha Ravichandhira – For service to the arts in music and dance.
- Graham Edward Reed – For service to cricket.
- Susie Reid – For service to community healthgender advocacy.
- Frances Lorraine Reynolds – For service to netball.
- Judith Margaret Richards – For service to the community of Eaglehawk.
- Keith Geoffrey Rickman – For service to the community of Stirling.
- Dr Peter Alexander Roberts – For service to emergency medicine.
- The late Rosario Rocca – For service to the community through a range of organisations.
- Liesl Alexandra Rockchild – For service to Indigenous art through administrative roles.
- Lynn Rodgers – For service to the community through a range of organisations.
- Glenn Osborne John Roff – For service to education.
- Elizabeth Jean Rogers – For service to refugee support services.
- Marshall Frederick Rosen – For service to cricket.
- Alexander Gregory Ross – For service to the community through a range of organisations.
- Robert John Rotar – For service to the performing arts.
- Barbara Rugendyke – For service to children as a foster carer.
- David Ross Rugendyke – For service to the community, and to children.
- Maureen Rush – For service to veterans and their families.
- Nola Josephine Rush – For service to the community.
- Joan Margaret Ryan – For service to the community through a range of organisations.
- Dianne Mary Ryder – For service to the Indigenous community of Western Australia.
- Susan Saleeba – For service to the international community of Kenya.
- Julie Anne Saunders – For service to the community of Crib Point.
- Dr Anthony Andrew Scalzo – For service to science as a researcher.
- Paul William Scroope – For service to the community through a range of organisations.
- Rhonda Gai Scruton – For service to surf lifesaving.
- Lynette Joy Sedgman – For service to the community through the not-for-profit sector.
- Stephen John Sedgman – For service to the community through the not-for-profit sector.
- Roger John Self – For service to the community of the Tasman Peninsula.
- Garth Setchell – For service to the community through a range of roles.
- The late Robert Alan Shearer – For service to golf.
- Darrell Gregory Shephard – For service to softball.
- Tamara Jane Shepherd – For service to the community through charitable organisations.
- David Howard Sherr – For service to the Jewish community of Melbourne.
- Peter William Simpson – For service to the performing arts as an entertainer.
- Kenneth Victor Simpson-Bull – For service to jazz music preservation.
- Selvamanickam Sinnathamby – For service to the community, particularly through the church.
- Lynette Skillern – For service to the community of Leongatha.
- Patrick Slattery – For service to the community through a range of roles.
- Donald Joseph Slaughter – For service to music as a pipe organist.
- Dr Karen Smith – For service to paramedicine.
- Raymond John Smith – For service to rowing.
- Rodney Leon Smith – For service to music education.
- William Horatio Smith – For service to the community through a range of organisations.
- Denise Smith-Ali – For service to Indigenous language preservation.
- John William Stavert – For service to the communities of Hornsby and Brooklyn.
- Nadia Maria Stefani – For service to the community of Fish Creek.
- Dr Mark James Stephens – For service to the community through a range of organisations.
- Paul Stevens – For service to the community of the Gold Coast.
- Dr Graeme Tyson Stevenson – For service to conservation and the environment.
- George Neil Stewart – For service to the community of Colac.
- Ronald Robert Stobaus – For service to athletics.
- Frederick William Stolz – For service to secondary education.
- Kenneth Raymond Stone – For service to the community through a range of organisations.
- Vena Mary Stoneham – For service to the community, particularly through the church.
- Dr Margaret Rwth Stuckey – For service to community health.
- The late Lyndsay Peter Suhr AFSM – For service to the community of Tasmania.
- Dr Jane Elizabeth Sullivan – For service to the community through a range of organisations.
- Rosemary Ann Swadling – For service to the community of Rockhampton.
- David Barry Swan – For service to the community through a range of roles.
- Guy Puget Tanner – For service to surf lifesaving.
- Samuel Louis Tatarka – For service to the Jewish community.
- The Reverend Gayle Teasdale – For service to the community, particularly through the church.
- Alan Terrens – For service to the community through a range of roles.
- Janet Lorraine Thomas – For service to animal welfare.
- Alan James Thompson – For service to wood turning.
- John Richard Tilly – For service to veterans.
- Stuart Graeme Tipple – For service to the law.
- Paulus Petrus Toonen – For service to the community of Redcliffe.
- Andrew Windeyer Traill – For service to the community through a range of organisations.
- Judith Ellen Travers – For service to education administration, and to the community.
- Bevan Sidney Treloar – For service to the community through a range of roles.
- The late David Andrew Turnbull – For service to local government administration.
- Steven Lawrence Turner – For service to square dancing.
- Robyn Margaret Twigg – For service to the community through a range of organisations.
- Reuben Urban – For service to the Jewish community.
- Alexandra Vakitsidis – For service to the Greek community of Adelaide.
- Liliane Vita – For service to dance as a teacher and administrator.
- John Byron Wade – For service to the community through charitable organisations.
- Dr Coralie Wales – For service to community health.
- Katherine Margaret Walker – For service to youth, and to the community.
- John Desmond Ward – For service to the community through a range of organisations.
- Judith Ward – For service to international relations.
- Pamela Kay Ward – For service to the community through a range of organisations.
- Arthur George Watson – For service to the community through a range of organisations.
- Carmel Weatherburn – For service to netball.
- Graham John Roland Wheeler – For service to community of Townsville through a range of organisations.
- Janet Whisson – For service to primary education.
- Kenneth White – For service to the community of the Cardinia Shire.
- Lone Vittrup White – For service to the creative arts as a ceramicist.
- Peter William White – For service to veterans, and to the community.
- Paul Whittemore – For service to the community of Port Stephens.
- Professor Tissa Wijeratne – For service to medicine as a neurologist.
- Dr Judith Lynne Wilks – For service to education.
- Tanya Yvette Wilks – For service to broadcast media, and to the community.
- Marianne Williams – For service to the community of Sunbury.
- Neil Raymond Williams – For service to the community of Sunbury.
- The late Reverend Roger Grant Williams – For service to secondary education.
- The late James Dowling Wilson – For service to the community through a range of roles.
- Tina Louise Wilson – For service to the visual arts.
- Uri Windt – For service to the Jewish community.
- Patricia Wood – For service to the community, particularly through the church.
- Peter Michael Woodhouse – For service to veterans.
- Florence Margaret Woods – For service to the community of Maleny.
- Dr Rodney James Woods – For service to medicine as a surgeon, and to water polo.
- John Walter Woodside – For service to the construction industry.
- David Douglas Wright – For service to the community of Bendigo.
- Glenn Wilbur Wright – For service to the community of Leongatha.
- Dr William Smylie Wright – For service to medicine as a psychiatrist.
- Dr Evelyn Mei Yin Yap – For service to medicine, and to multiculturalism.
- Jean Young – For service to community of the Surf Coast region.
- Rozanna Zalewski – For service to the community through a range of organisations.
- Keturah Zimran – For service to the visual arts.
- The late Ms Connee-Colleen – For service to the community of Queanbeyan.

==== Military Division ====
Navy

- Chief Petty Officer Nathan James Byast – For meritorious service in the field of Marine Engineering and training.
- Warrant Officer Richard John Dorey – For meritorious service to the Navy as an aircraft technician and as the Course Facilitator of the Chief Petty Officer and Warrant Officer Promotion Courses.
- Warrant Officer Michael James Madigan – For meritorious service in the field of Maritime Logistics.
- NA – For meritorious service in the delivery of weapons and technical intelligence within Defence.

Army

- Major Laurent Pierre Berlioz-Nott – For meritorious performance of duty in the development of target systems, intelligence procedures and training.
- Warrant Officer Class One Timothy James Langston – For meritorious service in the field of Military Intelligence doctrine and education.
- Warrant Officer Class One Eric John Lewis – For meritorious service in the field of senior leadership as the Regimental Sergeant Major of the Special Forces Group, 6th Brigade, 2nd Commando Regiment and the Special Forces Training Centre.
- Warrant Officer Class One Nardia Jane McCulloch – For meritorious service as the Command Chief Clerk at Forces Command and Headquarters 2nd Division, and as the Technical Manager at the Army Personnel Support Unit (New South Wales).

Air Force

- Sergeant Jason Deepak Bahadur – For meritorious performance of duty in the sustainment of the KC-30A capability for the Australian Defence Force.
- Sergeant Timothy John Davies – For meritorious performance of duty in target intelligence training for the Australian Defence Force.
- Wing Commander Rachael Sarah Quirk – For meritorious performance of duty in engineering, airworthiness and culture to enhance air power for the Australian Defence Force.

==== Honorary ====
- Katy Barfield – For service to business, and the environment.
- Margit Cianelli – For service to wildlife conservation.
- Emeritus Professor Peter Hayden Curson – For service to tertiary education.
- Claire Beatrice Edmanson – For service to youth through Scouts.
- Gerald Harwood – For service to youth through Scouts.

== Meritorius Service ==
=== Public Service Medal (PSM) ===
Public Service Medal ribbon

Commonwealth

- Lisiane Barao Macleod – For outstanding public service through contribution as a technologist, collaborator and leader in Services Australia's response to the COVID-19 pandemic.
- Chloe Morgan Burns – For outstanding public service in the development of statistical modelling and public health measures in response to the COVID-19 pandemic.
- Jodi Ann Cassar – For outstanding public service and leadership working across government to deliver advice, information and support for people with disability, workers and carers during the COVID-19 pandemic.
- Dr Amanda Jayne Craig – For outstanding public service in leading significant and complex safety and performance reviews of medical devices.
- Andrea Marie Faulkner – For outstanding public service in leading Australia's Embassy in Myanmar and commitment to advancing Australia's interests.
- Sonje Anoushka Franklin – For outstanding public service supporting the safety and wellbeing of vulnerable Australians overseas.
- Fiona Louise Ganter – For outstanding public service in legislative instrument drafting and for developing the Office of Parliamentary Counsel's instrument drafting capability.
- Bryan Geoffrey Hodge – For outstanding public service in the delivery of innovative meteorological science, technology and engineering solutions for Australia and its Pacific neighbours.
- Andrew Douglas Jaggers – For outstanding public service in supporting the Government's response to the COVID-19 pandemic, ensuring the safety and wellbeing of Australians.
- Sarah Aileen Johnson – For outstanding public service to Australians with disability through leadership and commitment to the National Disability Insurance Scheme.
- Sarah Jane Norris – For outstanding public service in reforming the National Medical Stockpile processes in response to the COVID-19 pandemic.
- Javier Ribalta – For outstanding public service through leadership and coordination of Services Australia's response to the COVID-19 pandemic.
- Jane Urquhart – For outstanding public service through sustained contribution to industry and science policy and programs to improve the economic wellbeing, global reputation and national interests of Australia.
- Andrea Louise Wallace-Green – For outstanding public service through sustained and significant contribution to social security policy and delivering outcomes for Australian individuals and families.

Australian Capital Territory

- Dr Kerryn Peta Coleman – For outstanding public service in public health, particularly as ACT Chief Health Officer.
- Leesa Maree Croke – For outstanding public service in social policy and in leading the ACT's Whole of Government COVID-19 response.
- Vanessa Dal Molin – For outstanding public service overseeing COVID-19 policy and intergovernmental relations during the ACT's COVID-19 response.
- Deborah Lynne Efthymiades – For outstanding public service to public education, in leading significant education system policy and reform for the ACT.
- Jessie Holberton – For outstanding public service to public health as the Clinical Nurse Consultant for the ACT Government COVID-19 vaccination program.
- Dr Anne Louise Jenkins – For outstanding public service to public health through specialised data analytics.
- Patricia Ellen Johnston – For outstanding public service as the Public Information Coordinator during the ACT's lockdown period.
- Dr Vanessa Johnston – For outstanding public service in public health, particularly as ACT Deputy Chief Health Officer.
- Toby Michael Keene – For outstanding public service to public health as the Executive Branch Manager, COVID-19 Response Branch in ACT Health.
- Dr Ian Mackenzie Marr – For outstanding public service to public health as the Infectious Disease specialist at Canberra Health Services.
- Andrew Peter Murphy – For outstanding public service to public health as the Senior Director of Procurement and Supply at Canberra Health Services.
- Catherine Ann O'Neill – For outstanding public service to health services as the Chief Operating Officer of Canberra Health Services.
- Tamerra Jane Rogers – For outstanding public service in communications and engagement as the Deputy Public Information Coordinator during the ACT's lockdown period.
- Dr Sally Louise Singleton – For outstanding public service to public health.
- Katherine Ruth Wakefield – For outstanding public service to public health as the Executive Director in the Division of Cancer and Ambulatory Support.

New South Wales

- Janet Elizabeth Bingham – For outstanding public service in recognising and maintaining the Aboriginal cultural heritage of the Bathurst region.
- Gail Connolly – For outstanding public service to local government, in particular in managing the amalgamation of Georges River Council.
- Dayn Michael Cooper – For outstanding public service in protecting and advancing the built heritage of New South Wales.
- Margaret Crawford – For outstanding public service in ensuring the integrity of the NSW Public sector through her role as Auditor General of NSW.
- Mark Arthur Harris – For outstanding public service in education, in particular for driving outcomes at Auburn North Public School.
- Vicki Gaye Manning – For outstanding public service through her leadership in the NSW Health COVID-19 response.
- Natalie Marsic – For outstanding public service in the COVID-19 response through her role as General Counsel of the NSW Police Force.
- James Angus McTavish, CSC, ESM – For outstanding public service to cross border communities and communities facing critical water supply issues.
- Dr Wayne Andrew O'Connor – For outstanding public service in aquaculture research.
- The late David Wayne Pearce – For outstanding public service in the mental health sector helping to improve mental health care and wellbeing across New South Wales.
- Elizabeth Ann Stockell – For outstanding public service in supporting the recovery of disaster affected communities in NSW.
- Meghanne Wellard – For outstanding public service in the recovery of the Department of Education's Rural North community following the Northern Rivers flood crisis.
- Matthew Patrick West – For outstanding public service as Administrative Assistant at the Public Service Commission.

Northern Territory

- Gabrielle Tahirih Brown – For outstanding public service to the Northern Territory Public Sector during the COVID-19 Pandemic.
- Catherine Ruth Weber – For outstanding public service to the Northern Territory Public Sector.

Queensland

- Donald William Bletchly – For outstanding public service to Queensland public transport systems and security.
- Duncan Kerslake – For outstanding public service to the development and advancement of Queensland Aboriginal and Torres Strait Islander businesses.
- Elton Noel Miller – For outstanding public service during COVID-19, to the development and protection of Agribusiness in Queensland.
- Clare O'Connor – For outstanding public service to the development and support of Queensland communities.
- Toni Maree Power – For outstanding public service to Queensland state development and infrastructure projects.
- Kenneth Leigh Timms – For outstanding public service to Queensland remote and regional communities.

South Australia

- Lisa Marguerite Cavanagh – For outstanding public service to the Local Government sector and emergency management.
- Donna Lee Dunbar – For outstanding public service to the residents and employees of the City of Charles Sturt.

Tasmania

- Commissioner Donna Louise Adams, APM – For outstanding public service through leadership during the COVID-19 pandemic.
- Mandy Ellen Denby – For outstanding public service as Director of the Public Information Unit within the Tasmanian State Control Centre during the COVID-19 pandemic.
- Craig Anthony Limkin – For outstanding public service in response to the COVID-19 pandemic.
- Dale Edward Webster – For outstanding public service during the COVID-19 pandemic.

Victoria

- Tony Francis Layh – For outstanding public service to the community, particularly in the area of prison procurement and relations.
- Janice Beng Li Lim – For outstanding public service in policy and program delivery, particularly in the areas of family violence, housing, and youth justice.
- Simon Grant Phemister – For outstanding public service through policy and program delivery, particularly within regions and agriculture.
- Kate Amber Rattigan – For outstanding public service to leadership and the delivery of improved products and services in the education sector.
- Jennifer Margaret Roberts – For outstanding public service in policy and program delivery, particularly in the areas of justice and corrections.
- Lisa Marie Scholes – For outstanding public service to the community, particularly in the area of Freedom of Information.
- James Clancy Whelan – For outstanding public service to policy and program delivery, particularly in the area of conservation.

Western Australia

- Wanita Bartholomeusz – For outstanding public service to improve relations between people of Aboriginal and Torres Strait Islander heritage and the broader Western Australia Police Force.
- Rebecca Ann Brown – For outstanding public service through leadership and management in response to the COVID-19 pandemic.
- David Kingsley Eaton – For outstanding public service to Small Business Development, particularly during the COVID-19 pandemic.
- Christopher James Field – For outstanding public service as Ombudsman and President of the International Ombudsman Institute.
- Susan Terese Kiely – For outstanding public service through the delivery of the Western Australian COVID-19 Vaccination Program.
- Sharyn Anne O'Neill – For outstanding public service through leadership and management in response to the COVID-19 pandemic.
- Amanda Jayne Pickrell – For outstanding public service through leadership and management in response to the COVID-19 pandemic.
- Leanne Kaye Potter – For outstanding public service through commitment to social justice and advocacy for the inclusion of AUSLAN in mainstream education.
- Emily Jane Roper – For outstanding public service through leadership and management in response to the COVID-19 pandemic.
- Dr David Jonathan Russell-Weisz – For outstanding public service through leadership and management in response to the COVID-19 pandemic.

=== Australian Police Medal (APM) ===
Australian Police Medal ribbon

Australian Federal Police

- Assistant Commissioner Justine Louise Gough
- Superintendent Corey Ellen Heldon
- Detective Sergeant Craig Jon Marriott
- Commander Andrea Maree Quinn
- Commander Peter Sykora

New South Wales Police Force

- Superintendent Danielle Emerton
- Detective Superintendent Martin James Fileman
- Superintendent Paul James Fuller
- Chief Inspector Christine Anne George
- Detective Chief Inspector William Peter McKenna
- Detective Superintendent Jodi Patricia Radmore
- Sergeant Steve Robert Schausinger
- Superintendent Alfio Sergi
- Superintendent Gregory John Taylor
- Fiona Jane West

Northern Territory Police Force

- Senior Sergeant Shaun Rodney Furniss
- Superintendent Peter Edward Malley

Queensland Police Service

- Detective Sergeant Katrina Louise Carr
- Inspector Ryan Dustin Clark
- Chief Superintendent Stephen John Dabinett
- Inspector Leonie Fordyce
- Chief Superintendent William Bernhardt Graham
- Superintendent Craig Robert Huxley
- Senior Sergeant John William McArthur
- Detective Senior Sergeant David John Miles
- Superintendent Rhys Newton
- Senior Sergeant George Shand
- Detective Senior Sergeant Vanessa Jane Wiseman
- Superintendent Bradley John Wright

South Australia Police

- Superintendent Guy Buckley
- Senior Sergeant Kylie-Marie England
- Senior Sergeant First Class Paul Joseph Kameniar

Tasmania Police

- Senior Constable Kelly Anne Cordwell
- Inspector John Gerard Toohey
- Commander Stuart Adrian Wilkinson

Victoria Police

- Detective Senior Sergeant Mark Laurence Colbert
- Sergeant Simon Michael Fogarty
- Inspector Marnie Kate Johnstone
- Leading Senior Constable Linda McLennan
- Commander Martin Dominic O'Brien
- Detective Leading Senior Constable Paul Steven Roberts
- Sergeant Sydney William Rudd-Schmidt
- Superintendent Janet Leanne Stevenson

Western Australia Police Force

- Detective Sergeant Jessica Amy Curley
- Detective Superintendent Gordon James Fairman
- Assistant Commissioner Tony Longhorn
- Inspector Jonathan Richard Munday

=== Australian Fire Service Medal (AFSM) ===
Australian Fire Service Medal ribbon

Queensland Fire and Emergency Services

- Ian Maxwell Fulton
- Robin Paul Boniwell
- Lesley Charlotte Brand

ACT Fire and Rescue

- Matthew Ian Mavity
- Gregory Istvan Abrahamffy

NSW Rural Fire Service

- Bruce William Angel
- Jennifer Gaye Bamman
- Peter Bulliman
- Warren James Cree, OAM
- Deputy Commissioner Peter Matthew McKechnie
- Maurice William McMillen
- Kym Maree Stanford
- Craig Walters

Fire and Rescue New South Wales

- Stephen Alan Hirst
- Belinda Gai Hooker
- Assistant Commissioner Roger Henry Mentha
- Peter Charles Ryan

Northern Territory Fire and Rescue Service

- Robert John Burgess
- Nathan Gregory Ferguson

South Australia Metropolitan Fire Services

- Joseph Hansen
- Cecilia Elizabeth Low

South Australian Country Fire Service

- Neville Howard Kies
- Brett Anthony Loughlin

Tasmania Fire Service

- Neil Ross Brooksbank
- Richard Edward Cosstick
- Wade Edward Stewart

Country Fire Authority of Victoria

- Mark Robert Cartledge
- Neil Leslie Marshall
- Michael John Rowe
- Robert Kenneth Small
- Kenneth John Stuart

Fire and Rescue Victoria

- Guy Thomas McCrorie
- Anthony Gerard O'Day

Western Australia Department of Fire & Emergency Services

- Justin Foureur
- Peter Mark Thomas

Bush Fire Board of Western Australia

- George Robert Grant

=== Ambulance Service Medal (ASM) ===
Ambulance Service Medal ribbon

Ambulance Service Victoria

- Brett Drummond
- Lewis Gerald McDonald
- Dr Benjamin Meadley
- Julie Faye Miller
- Carmel Louise Rogers

New South Wales Ambulance Services

- Dr Gary Tall

Queensland Ambulance Service

- Nadine Cherise Bond
- Kerry Matthew Dillon
- Mark Thomas Nugent

SA Ambulance Service

- Paul Graham Stratman
- Robert George Tolson
- David Christopher Walker

St John (NT) Inc

- Stuart James Allison
- Judith Barker

St John Ambulance Services Western Australia

- Dr Joseph Cuthbertson
- Danny Louis Rose

=== Emergency Services Medal (ESM) ===
Emergency Services Medal ribbon

New South Wales

- Susan Millicent Chapple
- Gary Ronald Daly
- Paul Jeffrey Marshall
- Henry Edward Scruton
- Bradley James Taylor
- Barry Andrew Wademan

Northern Territory

- Ian Mark Smith

Queensland

- Alex George Johnson

South Australia

- Toni Clarke
- Bradley Lewis Flew

Tasmania

- Brett Matthew Robins
- Leon Alfred Smith
- Neil Graham Wright

Victoria

- Leanne Robyn Boyd
- Charles Paul Debono
- Matthew John Ponsford
- David Anthony Rylance

Western Australia

- David John White

=== Australian Corrections Medal (ACM) ===
Australian Corrections Medal ribbon

New South Wales

- Denise Constantinou
- Andrew Steven Golgini
- Hana Hallak
- Jason Kenneth Schnepf
- Rex Campbell Talbot

Victoria

- Kerrie Louise Frank
- Janet Hatvani

Queensland

- Shane Bucholz Allwood
- Eloise Maree Hamlett
- Rhiannon Lee Porter

Western Australia

- Raymond Desmond Edge
- Dr Joy Rachel Rowland

South Australia

- Helen Yvonne Bales
- Anthony James Shillabeer

Tasmania

- Erin Louise Hunn

=== Australian Intelligence Medal (AIM) ===
Australian Intelligence Medal ribbon

- James Arnold
- Justine Fitzgerald
- Ellen Joyce Grace
- Ian H
- Robert H
- Ailsa Hale
- Coral Hinds
- Gareth K
- David L
- Luke S

== Distinguished and Conspicuous Service ==
=== Distinguished Service Cross (DSC) ===
Distinguished Service Cross ribbon

Army

- Lieutenant Colonel Kevin Dean Humphreys – For distinguished command and leadership in warlike operations as the Commander Aviation Support Element in Afghanistan from 1 March 2006 to 2 August 2006.
- Lieutenant Colonel L – For distinguished command and leadership in warlike operations as the Commander of Task Force 12 from 10 November 2020 to 28 August 2021.

=== Distinguished Service Medal (DSM) ===
Distinguished Service Medal ribbon

Army

- Brigadier M – For distinguished leadership in warlike operations, on Operation OKRA from November 2020 to October 2021.

=== Commendation for Distinguished Service ===
Commendation for Distinguished Service ribbon

Army

- Lieutenant Colonel Khalid El Khaligi – For distinguished performance of duty in warlike operations as the Deputy Chief of Operations in the Headquarters of the Combined Joint Task Force – Operation Inherent Resolve, on Operation OKRA from February 2021 to November 2021.

=== Bar to the Conspicuous Service Cross (CSC and Bar) ===
Conspicuous Service Cross and Bar ribbon

Army

- Colonel John George Papalitsas, CSC – For outstanding achievement as the Commanding Officer of the North West Mobile Force and as the inaugural Commander of the Regional Force Surveillance Group.

=== Conspicuous Service Cross (CSC) ===
Conspicuous Service Cross ribbon

Navy

- Captain Anne Majella Andrews, RAN – For outstanding achievement in the field of Navy human resource management.
- Commander Cindy Maree Jenkins, RAN – For outstanding achievement as the Commanding Officer Royal Australian Navy Recruit School.
- Warrant Officer Andrew David Jocumsen – For outstanding devotion to duty in the field of Defence People development.
- Lieutenant Commander Makaila Rhea Lasalo, RAN – For outstanding achievement as the Royal Australian Navy Maritime Surveillance Adviser to Tonga.
- Captain Richard John Lindsey, RAN – For outstanding achievement in senior submarine training roles in the Royal Australian Navy.
- Commander Andrew Robert Newman, RAN – For outstanding achievement as the MH-60R Seahawk 'Romeo' Helicopter Capability Assurance Program Co-lead from December 2019 to December 2021.
- Lieutenant Commander Simone Louise Paterson, RAN – For outstanding devotion to duty as Commanding Officer HMAS Childers.

Army

- Lieutenant Colonel Adam Whyte Bryden – For outstanding achievement as Staff Officer Grade One Indo-Pacific Operations, Headquarters Joint Operations Command.
- Lieutenant Colonel Séan Christopher Fleming – For outstanding achievement as the Staff Officer Grade One Personnel and Staff Officer Grade One Policy within Headquarters Australian Army Cadets over the period 2018 to 2021.
- Colonel Douglas John Humphreys, OAM – For outstanding devotion to duty as the Panel Leader of the New South Wales Australian Army Legal Corps Panel and Senior Reserve Officer, Army Command Support Panel.
- Lieutenant Colonel Marek Konrad Janiszewski – For outstanding achievement in modernising land force capability in the Australian Army.
- Brigadier Jocelyn Anne King – For outstanding achievement in multiple roles supporting the formation, conduct of, and response by, the Afghanistan Inquiry Taskforce.
- Lieutenant Colonel N – For outstanding achievement in the application of exceptional skills and judgement over successive postings within Special Operations Command.
- Major N – For outstanding achievement in the development and delivery of joint capabilities on behalf of the Australian Defence Force.
- Colonel Thomas Malcolm Nairn – For outstanding devotion to duty as Commander Australian Contingent and Senior Military Observer, Operation Aslan, United Nations Mission in South Sudan from November 2020 to September 2021.
- Colonel Marc Jason Rhodes – For outstanding achievement as the Deputy Director LAND 400 Phase 3 Infantry Fighting Vehicle Test and Evaluation Activity.
- Colonel Michael John Scott – For outstanding devotion to duty in non-warlike operations as the Acting Head of Military, United Nations Truce Supervision Organisation, from October 2019 to October 2021.
- Lieutenant Colonel Benjamin Lloyd Shepherd – For outstanding achievement as the Deputy Director Force Structure Plan Directorate, Force Design Division, and Staff Officer Grade One Army Objective Force, Future Land Warfare Branch, Army Headquarters.
- Lieutenant Colonel David Silverstone – For outstanding achievement as Director Operations and Director Plans in Headquarters Joint Task Force 633 on Operation ACCORDION from February to September 2021.
- Brigadier David John Smith AM, DSM – For outstanding achievement in the development, acquisition and support of critical combat and non-combat equipment for soldiers, sailors and aviators as Director General Integrated Soldier Systems Branch.

Air Force

- Squadron Leader Gregory Dennett Baker-Moss – For outstanding devotion to duty in support to the Governor of New South Wales, and in the development and implementation of management systems at Government House Sydney.
- Squadron Leader Andrew Willem Boeree – For outstanding devotion to duty in Capability Development, and Command and Management in Surveillance and Response Group for the Royal Australian Air Force.
- Sergeant Alisha Kate Clarkson – For outstanding achievement in maturing the Office of Head of Air Force Capability, and establishment and sustainment of the Office of the Australian Defence Force Space Commander.
- Squadron Leader Del Maree Gaudry – For outstanding achievement in implementation of the National Action Plan on Woman, Peace and Security, and in the welfare and mental well-being of Royal Australian Air Force members.
- Flight Lieutenant Laura Ashleigh Haws – For outstanding achievement in Aircraft Fleet Maintenance Management for the Royal Australian Air Force.
- Sergeant Amy Pamela Hestermann-Crane – For outstanding devotion to duty in development and sustainment of an operational intelligence capability in the Australian Space Operations Centre for the Australian Defence Force.
- Flight Lieutenant David Lloyd Hughes – For outstanding achievement in Air Traffic Controller training for the Australian Defence Force.
- Corporal Christian Stephen Kneale – For outstanding achievement in Defensive Cyber Capability development for the Australian Defence Force.
- Air Commodore Stephen Richard Martin, AM – For outstanding achievement as the Defence Program Manager for the Support to Wounded, Injured and Ill Program and the Director Special Projects in the Defence People Group.
- Squadron Leader Justin Mark Van Beuningen – For outstanding devotion to duty in sustainment of the C-27J Spartan transport aircraft capability for the Australian Defence Force.
- Corporal George Rainer Wallace – For outstanding achievement as an Avionics Technician supporting C-130J-30 Super Hercules medium-sized tactical transport aircraft for the Australian Defence Force.

=== Bar to the Conspicuous Service Medal (CSM and Bar) ===
Conspicuous Service Medal and Bar ribbon

Navy

- Commander Kathryn Rebecca Ford, CSM RAN – For meritorious achievement in the field of Navy training.

Army

- Lieutenant Colonel Clarence Vincent Hovell, CSM – For meritorious achievement as Commanding Officer of the Combat Training Centre – Live during 2020 and 2021.
- Warrant Officer Class One Mark Retallick, OAM CSM – For meritorious achievement as the Command Warrant Officer Joint Task Force 633 on Operation ACCORDION from November 2020 to September 2021.

=== Conspicuous Service Medal (CSM) ===
Conspicuous Service Medal ribbon

Navy

- Lieutenant Commander Tristan Lawrence Colclough, RAN – For meritorious achievement as the 808 Squadron Aviation Engineering Officer.
- Commander Samuel Rod Dale, RAN – For meritorious devotion to duty as Future Operations Coordinator at Maritime Operations in the planning of all Australian Defence Force maritime operations.
- Chief Petty Officer Garry Edward Danaher – For meritorious achievement as the Royal Australian Navy Technical Adviser to Tonga.
- Chief Petty Officer Christopher Llyweln Bell – For meritorious devotion to duty in the field of Navy People management.
- Petty Officer Justin Mark Macey – For meritorious devotion to duty as the Catering Manager in HMAS Brisbane.
- Leading Seaman Darryl James Malone – For meritorious achievement in the field of Navy Remotely Piloted Aerial System operations.
- Commander Christopher Charles McGregor, RAN – For meritorious devotion to duty in the field of Navy Guided Weapons and Explosive Ordnance Sustainment.
- Warrant Officer Benjamin Anthony Reid, RAN – For meritorious devotion to duty as the Ship Manager HMAS Sirius.
- Warrant Officer Cherie June Theyers – For meritorious achievement in training development and remediation of the Intelligence Sailor workforce in the Royal Australian Navy.

Army

- Major Heath Michael Clancy – For meritorious devotion to duty and dedication to the advancement of the Australian Defence Force special operations helicopter capability as the Regiment Flying Standards Officer at the 6th Aviation Regiment.
- Lieutenant Colonel Leigh Scott Crawford – For meritorious achievement in innovation and international engagement as Commanding Officer of the Australian Defence Force Peace Operations Training Centre.
- Warrant Officer Class Two D – For meritorious devotion to duty in the field of enhancing Counter Terrorism capabilities and Special Forces Instruction while posted to the 2nd Commando Regiment and the Australian Defence Force School of Special Operations.
- Lieutenant Colonel Marcus William Doherty – For meritorious achievement as the Staff Officer Grade Three for Quantum Technology within Future Land Warfare Branch, Army Headquarters, and delivering Army's Quantum Technology Roadmap and driving innovation in emerging technology.
- Major Brent Alexander Doyle, OAM – For meritorious achievement and service as Regimental Sergeant Major Training and Doctrine.
- Major Robert John Gibson – For meritorious achievement as the Officer Commanding Joint Task Group 629.2.2 for Operation COVID-19 Assist (Victoria) from December 2020 to March 2021.
- Warrant Officer Class One Tanya Louise Graham – For meritorious devotion to duty as the Strategic Distribution Enterprise Advisor within the Directorate of Force Structure – Army in the conduct of the Land Combat Capability Review and fundamental reform of Defence's land materiel management processes.
- Lieutenant Colonel Gareth Justin Kemp – For meritorious devotion to duty as the Staff Officer Training of the Land Warfare Centre and Foundation Training Review Planner for the Royal Military College of Australia.
- Lieutenant Colonel Paul Bradley Manning – For meritorious achievement as Headquarters Joint Operations Command representative in the Integrated Project Management Team for General John Baker Complex Capability Assurance Project.
- Warrant Officer Class Two P – For meritorious devotion to duty as the Warrant Officer Development at the Australian Defence Force Parachuting School.
- Lieutenant Colonel Jacob Andrew Penley – For meritorious achievement as the Brigade Major of the 1st Brigade during 2020 and 2021.
- Warrant Officer Class One Craig Malcolm Smith – For meritorious devotion to duty as Land Mobility and Support Program – Supply Warrant Officer in Platforms Branch, Army Headquarters.
- Warrant Officer Class Two John Martin van de Maele – For meritorious devotion to duty as the Air Dispatch Trade Warrant Officer of 9th Force Support Battalion and Project Officer at the Air Mobility Training and Development Unit.
- Corporal Gavin Thomas Watson – For meritorious devotion to duty as a Technician Electrical Section Commander within Technical Support Troop, 1st Signal Regiment during period January 2019 to September 2021.

Air Force

- Squadron Leader Mark Andrew Mohr-Bell – For meritorious achievement in F-35 Joint Strike Fighter air combat operational testing and capability development for the Australian Defence Force.
- Corporal Anthony John Kunda – For meritorious achievement in development of a video capability in C-130J-30 Hercules aircraft.
