= Margaret Davies (disambiguation) =

Margaret Davies (1884–1963) was a Welsh patron of the arts and an art collector

Margaret Davies may also refer to:

- Margaret Llewelyn Davies (1861–1944), British women's rights campaigner
- Margaret Davies (writer) (c. 1700–1778 or 1785), Welsh poet
- Margaret M. Davies (born 1944), Australian herpetologist
- Margaret Davies (conservationist) (1914–1982), English conservationist and archaeologist
- Margaret Davies (legal scholar), Australian legal scholar

== See also ==
- Davies (surname)
