= McMenamin =

McMenamin is an Irish surname. In Gaelic it is rendered, Mac Meanman, meaning 'son of Meanma' a name meaning courageous or high spirited. It originated in County Donegal in the 13th century. The first written mention of the name is in 1303 in the 'Annals of Loch Cé' which records the deaths of Donnchadh Mac Meanman and Aedh Mac Meanman, grandsons of the Lector O'Domnhaill, the chieftain of Fanad, during a dynastic struggle within the Cenél Conaill. The McMenamins are a branch of the O'Donnells of Tyrconnell (Donegal) and are part of the Sil Lugdach, descendants of Lugaid mac Sétnai, the great-grandson of Conall Gulban. Like many discarded branches of noble families, the McMenamins sought advancement in the church evidenced by numerous mentions of McMenamin prelates in papal letters from the late 1300s to the late 1400s. They were supplanted in their home territory of Fanad by the Sweeneys and over the centuries became more distantly related to the royal line of the Cenél Conaill. One scholar describes the family as "...a discarded branch of the O'Donnell dynasty" (Darren Mc Eiteagain . 1995 "Donegal History and Society: Interdisciplinary Essays on the History of an Irish County". Geography Publications: UCD)

Notable people with the surname include:

- Brian McMenamin (born 1957), American businessman and philanthropist
- Conor McMenamin (born 1995), Northern Irish footballer
- Chris McMenamin (born 1989), Scottish footballer
- Ciarán McMenamin (born 1975), Irish actor
- Colin McMenamin (born 1981), Scottish footballer
- Daniel McMenamin (1882–?), Irish politician and barrister
- Eugene McMenamin (born 1947), Irish politician
- James McMenamin (1910–2000), Australian cricket umpire
- Joseph J. McMenamin, United States Marine Corps general
- Kevin McMenamin, Irish Gaelic football player
- Mark McMenamin, American paleontologist
- Paul McMenamin (born 1956), Australian academic
- Ryan McMenamin, Canadian-born Irish Gaelic footballer
- Conor McMenamin, Irish footballer

There is also a spelling of "McMenimon", found mostly in the north east region of the United States.

== See also ==
- McMenamins, hospitality company (e.g. pubs in the northwestern U.S.)
- McManaman, surname
