= Lyn R. Griffiths =

Australian geneticist

Lyn R. Griffiths AM
- Education: University of New South Wales (BSc(Hons)); University of Sydney (PhD)
- Known for: Genetics of migraine
- Awards: Order of Australia
- Scientific career
- Fields: Human Genetics
- Workplaces: Queensland University of Technology
- Website: www.qut.edu.au/about/our-people/academic-profiles/lyn.griffiths

Lyn Robyn Griffiths AM is an Australian academic who serves as Distinguished Professor of molecular genetics at Queensland University of Technology, where she is director of the Centre for Genomics and Personalised Health, the Genomics Research Centre and the BridgeTech Programs. Griffiths is internationally renowned for her work in the discovery of the genetics of migraine headaches.

== Career ==
Griffiths graduated with a bachelor's degree in science in 1978 from the University of New South Wales. After subsequently completing her honours degree, she was awarded an NHMRC Biomedical Postgraduate Scholarship to undertake her PhD at Sydney University. She went on to spend time as a post-doctoral researcher at the University of Sydney, before moving to Griffith University on the Gold Coast, Queensland. There, she worked her way up to become Professor and Dean of Research (Griffith Health) and Director of the Griffith Health Institute (now called Menzies Health Institute Queensland). In 2013, she relocated her laboratory to the Institute of Health and Biomedical Innovation at Queensland University of Technology, where she took up the role of Executive Director. When the Institute was disbanded in 2020, she was appointed to the position of Inaugural Director of QUT's Centre of Genomics and Personalised Health.

== Research ==
Prof. Griffiths’ research has led to diagnostic breakthroughs for several neurogenetic disorders, including familial migraine, ataxia, epilepsy and hereditary stroke. Her research has appeared in more than 400 peer-reviewed international journals, including Nature, the American Journal of Human Genetics, and Nature Neurology.

== Publications ==
=== Journal articles ===
Google Scholar lists over 500 documents by Griffiths, which have been cited in excess of 16,000 times, and calculates her h-index as 67.

=== Book chapters ===
- Morris, B. J. & Griffiths, L. R. (1999). Chapter 1: Genes for essential hypertension: the first decade of research. In P. M. Frossard (Ed.), Genetic, Immune and Molecular Predisposition to Hypertension. (pp. 1–45). Utrecht, Netherlands: VSP.
- Carless, M. A., Ashton, K. J., & Griffiths, L. R. (2006). Chapter 6: Cytogenetics of basal cell carcinoma and squamous cell carcinomas. In J. Reichrath (Ed.), Molecular Mechanisms of Basal Cell and Squamous Cell Carcinomas. (p49-57). New York, USA: Springer. ISBN 0-387-26046-3.
- Colson, N. J., Lea, R. A., Fernandez, F., & Griffiths, L. R. (2007). Chapter 1: The genetics of migraine. In L. B. Clarke (Ed.), Migraine Disorders Research Trends. (pp. 5–34). New York, USA: Nova Science Publishers. ISBN 978-1-60021-553-7.
- Carless, M. A. & Griffiths, L. R. (2009). Cytogenetics of melanoma and nonmelanoma skin cancer. In J. Reichrath (Ed.), Sunlight, Vitamin D and Skin Cancer. (pp. 227–240). New York, USA: Springer. ISBN 978-0-387-77573-9.
- Green, M. R., Camilleri, E., Gandhi, M. K., & Griffiths, L. R. (2009). Genetic susceptibility to complex traits: moving towards informed analysis of whole-genome screens. In A. Matsumoto & M. Nakano (Eds.), The Human Genome: Features, Variations and Genetic Disorders. (pp. 167–180). New York, USA: Nova Science Publishers. ISBN 978-1-607-41695-1
- Carless, M. A. & Griffiths, L. R. (2011). Cytogenetics of primary skin tumors. In M. J. Murphy (Ed.), Chapter 4: Molecular Diagnostics in Dermatology and Dermatopathology. (pp. 57–72). New York, USA: Springer. ISBN 978-1-60761-170-7.
- Menon, S., & Griffiths, L. R. (2013). Nutraceuticals in migraine treatment. In H. C. Diener (Ed.), Novel Approaches in Migraine Treatment. (pp. 134–145) London, UK: Future Medicine Ltd. ISBN 178084235X.
- Carless M. And Griffiths L. R. (2014). Cytogenetics of melanoma and non-melanoma skin cancer. In Sunlight, Vitamin D and skin-cancer – 2nd Edition. Springer New York. doi:10.1007/978-1-4939-0437-2_9 ISBN 978-1-4939-0436-5.
- Gasparini, C. F., Smith, R. A., & Griffiths, L. R. (2016). Chapter 4: Migraine and Glutamate – Modulators of Glutamatergic Signalling as Potential Treatments of Neuropsychiatric Disorders. In Z. M. Pavlovic (Ed.), Modulators of Glutamatergic Signalling as Potential Treatments of Neuropsychiatric Disorders. Nova Science Publishers, Inc. New York. ISBN 978-1-63483-493-3 (ebook).

== Service to professional organisations ==
Distinguished Professor Griffiths has contributed significantly to her profession. She serves as Chair, Board of Censors for Diagnostic Genomics with the Human Genetics Society of Australasia. Additionally she has served on a number of boards to various bodies including the National Heart Foundation of Australia (Queensland Division),

== Recognition ==
- 1984-1987 NHMRC Biomedical Postgraduate Scholarship
- 2001 Most downloaded article for 2001 Year in Molecular Cellular Probes
- 2003 Griffith University Commendation for Excellence in Teaching
- 2004 Centenary Medal Award - Distinguished Service to Education & Medical Research
- 2004 Gold Coast Honours Award (Education and Medical Research Category)
- 2005 Australian of the Year, Queensland Finalist
- 2006 Suncorp Queenslander of the Year Nominee
- 2006 Smart State – Smart Women Finalist (Research Scientist Category)
- 2010 Research Excellence Award for Senior Researcher, Griffith University
- 2013 Gold Coast Overall Leadership Award International Women’s Day Festival 2013
- 2014 Finalist, Life Sciences Queensland (LSQ) Industry Excellence Award
- 2014 Finalist, Life Sciences Outstanding Achievement Award, Women in Technology (WiT)
- 2014 Greppi Award: Best International Migraine Paper, 4th European Headache Migraine Trust International Congress (EHMTIC)
- 2015 Finalist, Life Sciences Outstanding Achievement, Women in Technology (WiT)
- 2015 Fellow, Queensland Academy of Arts and Sciences
- 2017 Human Genetics Society of Australasia, Sutherland Lecturer, 2010
- 2018 Fellow of the National Heart Foundation
- 2020 Life Sciences Queensland Limited (LSQ) - the Globally Engaging Networking Event (GENE) Awards: Life Sciences QIMR Berghofer Women of Influence Award
- 2020 Medical Technology Association of Australia: 2020 Outstanding Achievement Award
- 2023 Appointed Member of the Order of Australia (AM) in the 2023 Australia Day Honours for "significant service to genetics, and to research into neurological disorders".
