= Michelle Leech =

Michelle Leech is an Australian rheumatologist and clinician-scientist. She is the current Head of the Medical Course at Monash University and Deputy Dean at the Faculty of Medicine, Nursing and Health Sciences overseeing the delivery of Monash's medical program across the Clayton, Gippsland and Malaysia campuses.

== Education ==
Leech graduated with a Bachelor of Medicine and Bachelor of Surgery (Hons) from Monash University in 1987. She completed basic physician training at Prince Henry's Hospital and advanced physician training in rheumatology at Monash Health. Leech completed her PhD in 1999 through Monash University's Centre for Inflammatory Diseases with her thesis titled "Regulation of inflammation by endogenous glucocorticoids and MIF". She became a Fellow of the Royal Australasian College of Physicians in 2000.

== Career ==
=== Clinical ===
Leech is a consultant physician and currently serves as Head of the Rheumatoid Arthritis Clinic at Monash Health. In 2014, Leech was the Medical Director of Arthritis Australia. She has served on a number of National Rheumatology Advisory Boards, including Janssen-Cilag, Novartis, Abbvie, UCB, Cortical and MSD.

=== Research ===
Leech is part of the rheumatology research group in the School of Clinical Sciences at Monash Health. Her research interests are focused on cytokine biology, glucocorticoid action and cell cycle proteins in the context of Rheumatoid arthritis (RA) pathogenesis. She also maintains an active research profile in medical and interprofessional education. Leech has published over 70 peer-reviewed papers. Her most cited papers are:

- Leech M, Metz C, Hall P, Hutchinson P, Gianis K, Smith M, Weedon H, Holdsworth SR, Bucala R, Morand EF. Macrophage migration inhibitory factor in rheumatoid arthritis: evidence of proinflammatory function and regulation by glucocorticoids. Arthritis & Rheumatism. 1999 Aug;42(8):1601-8. According to Google Scholar, it has been cited 388 times
- Morand EF, Leech M, Bernhagen J. MIF: a new cytokine link between rheumatoid arthritis and atherosclerosis. Nature reviews Drug discovery. 2006 May;5(5):399-411. According to Google Scholar, this article has been cited 375 times
- Leech M, Metz C, Santos L, Peng T, Holdsworth SR, Bucala R, Morand EF. Involvement of macrophage migration inhibitory factor in the evolution of rat adjuvant arthritis. Arthritis & Rheumatism: y. 1998 May;41(5):910-7.According to Google Scholar, this article has been cited 222 times

=== Administration ===
As of June 2024, Leech is a Deputy Dean in the Faculty of Medicine at Monash University, Nursing and Health Sciences. Prior to this appointment, Leech was director of the undergraduate medical program at Southern Clinical School (now the School of Clinical Sciences at Monash Health). Other appointments include Deputy Chairperson, Postgraduate Medical Council of Victoria, Vice President, Medical Deans Australia and New Zealand, and member of the Scientific Advisory Committee, Arthritis Australia.

In 2010, Leech received funding from the Department of Health and Ageing to develop interprofessional learning opportunities at Monash University and Southern Health (now Monash Health).

In 2017, Monash University's medical program moved from a Bachelor of Medical Science and Bachelor of Surgery (MBBS) to a Doctor of Medicine (MD) under Leech's leadership. Leech also serves on the Royal Australasian College of Physicians examination panel.

== Honours, awards and distinctions ==
- Australian Medical Students' Association, National Teaching Award, 2012
- Honorary Member of the Order of Australia, 2023 Australia Day Honours
