= Margaret Davies (legal scholar) =

Australian legal scholar

Margaret Davies FASSA FAAL
- Occupation: Legal scholar
- Awards: Fellow of the Academy of the Social Sciences in Australia (2006); Corresponding Fellow of the British Academy (2025)

Academic background
- Education: University of Adelaide (BA and LLB); University of Sussex (MA and DPhil)

Academic work
- Institutions: Flinders University

Margaret Jane Davies FASSA FAAL is an Australian legal scholar. She is Matthew Flinders Distinguished Professor of Law at Flinders University, and is a Corresponding Fellow of the British Academy.

== Biography ==
In the 1980s, Davies studied at University of Adelaide, where she obtained her BA in English and LLB (both 1st Class Honours). She later relocated to the United Kingdom, where she obtained an MA in Critical Theory and DPhil in Legal and Critical Theory at University of Sussex.

Davies joined the Flinders University Law School as one of its first faculty members, and Matthew Flinders Distinguished Professor of Law. In 2011, she served as chair of the Australian Research Council College of Experts' Humanities and Creative Arts Panel. She has also held several visiting positions, including a Leverhulme Visiting Professorship at the University of Kent.

Davies specialises in legal theory; particular subdisciplines she is involved in include critical legal theory, legal pluralism, and intersections of law with social and ecological environments. She won the 2018 Socio-Legal Studies Association Socio-Legal Theory and History Prize for her 2017 book Law Unlimited: Materialism, Pluralism and Legal Theory. She authored Asking the Law Question, a legal theory textbook which had its fifth edition in 2023. Other books she wrote include Delimiting the Law (1996), Are Persons Property (2001; with Ngaire Naffine), Property: Meanings, Histories, Theories (2007), and EcoLaw (2022).

In 2006, she was elected Fellow of the Academy of the Social Sciences in Australia. In 2025, she was elected Corresponding Fellow of the British Academy. She is also a fellow of the Australian Academy of Law.

== Books ==
- Delimiting the Law (1996)
- (with Ngaire Naffine) Are Persons Property (2001)
- Property: Meanings, Histories, Theories (2007)
- Law Unlimited (2018)
- EcoLaw (2022)
- Asking the Law Question (2023)
