= McManaman =

McManaman is a surname. Notable people with the surname include:

- Callum McManaman (born 1991), English footballer
- Clint McManaman (born 1980), American drummer
- Edward Peter McManaman (1900–1964), American Catholic bishop
- Steve McManaman (born 1972), English footballer

== See also ==
- McMenamin
