= Gemma Figtree =

Medical researcher

Gemma Alexandra Figtree AM is an Interventional Cardiologist at Royal North Shore Hospital, Professor in Medicine at the University of Sydney, chair of the Federal Government's 10-year Mission for Cardiovascular Health, and co-leader of the Cardiovascular Theme for Sydney Health Partners.

== Career ==
Figtree has dedicated her career to unravelling key mechanisms of heart attack susceptibility, combining clinical work as an interventional cardiologist with laboratory research, large cohort studies, and clinical trials.

As a Rhodes Scholar at Oxford University, Figtree's cardiovascular research led to fundamental discoveries about estrogen and NO/redox regulation. Her research focuses on improving prediction, prevention and treatment of cardiovascular disease and heart attacks, inspired by her clinical work as an interventional cardiologist.

== Research ==
Discoveries in her laboratory have been published in leading peer-reviewed journals, with over 190 publications cited ~9250 times. Driven by patient care as an interventional cardiologist, Figtree's research reflects bench-to-bedside knowledge translation of molecular discoveries to the clinic, and her work with health digital twin technology contributes to advances in precision medicine.

As a cardiologist spokesperson, Figtree has been recognized for her work with baby heart conditions, cardiovascular disease, and heart attacks in people who are not identified as "at risk", and leads the Federal Mission for Cardiovascular Health.

=== Selected publications ===
Year	TItle	Journal
2021	The health digital twin: advancing precision cardiovascular medicine	Nature Reviews Cardiology
2021	Mortality in STEMI patients without standard modifiable risk factors: a sex-disaggregated analysis of SWEDEHEART registry data	The Lancet
2020	Using machine learning to ace cardiovascular risk tests	Cardiovascular Research
2021	FXYD1 Is Protective Against Vascular Dysfunction	Hypertension
2020	Single‐Cell Immune Profiling in Coronary Artery Disease: The Role of State‐of‐the‐Art Immunophenotyping With Mass Cytometry in the Diagnosis of Atherosclerosis	Circulation Research
2021	Association of Global Coagulation Profiles With Cardiovascular Risk Factors and Atherosclerosis: A Sex Disaggregated Analysis From the BioHEART‐CT Study	Circulation Research
2021	A Call to Action for New Global Approaches to Cardiovascular Disease Drug Solutions	Circulation Research
2021	Bench-to-Bedside in Vascular Medicine: Optimizing the Translational Pipeline for Patients With Peripheral Artery Disease	Circulation Research
2021	Coronary artery disease patients without standard modifiable risk factors (SMuRFs)- a forgotten group calling out for new discoveries	European Heart Journal
2021	A call to action for new global approaches to cardiovascular disease drug solutions	European Heart Journal

== Awards ==
Figtree was appointed a Member of the Order of Australia in the 2023 Australia Day Honours.

She was awarded a National Health and Medical Research Council (NHMRC) Excellence Award for Top Ranked Practitioner Fellow (Australia), commencing in 2018. In 2019 and 2020 she received the prestigious NSW Ministerial Award for Cardiovascular Research Excellence.

Year	Award	Organisation
2020	NSW Ministerial Award for Cardiovascular Research Excellence	NSW Health + Heart Foundation
2019	NSW Ministerial Award for Cardiovascular Research Excellence	NSW Health + Heart Foundation
2018	Excellence Award for Top Ranked Practitioner Fellow (Australia)	NHMRC
