= Clara Chow =

Australian cardiologist

Professor Clara Chow AM FAHMS

Personal details
- Occupation: Cardiologist

Clara Chow is an Australian cardiologist who is the program director of community-based cardiac services at Sydney's Westmead Hospital. She is a professor of medicine at the University of Sydney in the field of cardiovascular disease epidemiology, prevention, treatment and innovation. In 2019, she was appointed the academic director of the Westmead Applied Research Centre, a collaborative centre with a mission to better understand the causes of cardiovascular disease and translate their research to new treatments. She has also held the role of academic co-director of the Charles Perkins Centre since 2016.

== Career ==
After her medical training, Chow completed a PhD in medicine at the University of Sydney followed by a post-doctoral position at McMaster University, Canada. She held the role of director of the Cardiovascular Division at The George Institute for Global Health from 2014 to 2017, where she now is a professorial fellow.

In 2020 Chow was selected as president of the Cardiac Society of Australia and New Zealand, the first woman to hold the position in the 68-year history of the cardiac society. She was appointed director of the Australian Stroke and Heart Research Accelerator, a centre funded in 2021 through the MTPConnect-supported Targeted Translation Research Acceleration initiative to support entrepreneurship in cardiovascular health. In 2023 she was elected as a Fellow of the Australian Academy of Health and Medical Sciences.

== Awards ==
Chow's research and clinical innovation have been recognised in a number of awards, including:

- 2024 Finalist for Premier's NSW Woman of Excellence.
- 2023 Member of the Order of Australia (for significant service to medicine as a cardiologist, and to research).
- 2023 Elected Fellow of the Academy of Health and Medical Sciences
- 2022 Brilliant Women in Digital Health Awards.
- 2020 NSW Women of the Year Award (finalist).

== Research ==
Chow's research focuses on cardiovascular disease prevention, clinical trials, and the evaluation of digital health tools for preventing and managing cardiovascular disease, particularly though SMS. She has been listed as the Chief Investigator on 17 grants since 2003, and received funding through Google's Impact Challenge in 2017 and 2019 for the design and evaluation of digital innovations for the prevention and treatment of heart attacks.
