= Ngaire Naffine =

Australian legal academic

Ngaire Naffine OAM FASSA FBA
- Born: Ngaire May Naffin; 1954 (age 71–72)

Academic background
- Education: University of Adelaide
- Thesis: Criminality, deviance and conformity in women (1983)

Academic work
- Institutions: University of Adelaide

Ngaire May Naffine (born 1954) OAM FASSA FBA is an Australian feminist legal academic and Professor Emerita at the University of Adelaide.

== Life ==
Born in 1954 Ngaire May Naffin, she changed her surname to Naffine in 1987. She graduated from the University of Adelaide with an LLB, followed by a PhD in 1983 on "Criminality, deviance and conformity in women".

Her research interests have focussed on women, both as victims and perpetrators of crime, feminist jurisprudence and medical law. Before her retirement, she was Bonython Professor of Law at the University of Adelaide, having spent the majority of her career at that university, with visiting appointments to Birkbeck College at the University of London, the European University Institute in Florence, Italy, the Cleveland-Marshall College of Law in Cleveland, Ohio and the Osgoode Hall Law School on Toronto, Canada.

Naffine was elected a Fellow of the Academy of the Social Sciences in Australia in 2006 and a Corresponding Fellow of the British Academy in 2020.

In 2016 she presented the Shirley Smith Address in New Zealand on "Manliness, Male Right and Criminal law: the Uses of Criminal Law in the Formation of the Character of the Male Legal Person".

== Honours and recognition ==
Naffine was elected a Fellow of the Academy of the Social Sciences in Australia in 2006 and an International Fellow of the British Academy in 2020.

She was awarded the Medal of the Order of Australia in the 2023 Australia Day Honours for "service to the law, and to the legal profession".

== Selected works ==
In addition to the books listed below, Naffine has co-edited many legal texts, as well as contributing chapters to other publications.

=== Books ===
- Naffin, Ngaire (1985), Domestic violence and the law, South Australia: Women's Adviser's Office
- Naffine, Ngaire (1987), Female crime: The construction of women in criminology, Allen & Unwin, ISBN 0043020046
- Naffine, Ngaire (1990), Law and the sexes explorations in feminist jurisprudence, Allen & Unwin, ISBN 978-0-04-442210-5
- Naffine, Ngaire (23 January 1997), Feminism and criminology, Polity Press (published 1997), ISBN 978-0-7456-1164-8
- Naffine, Ngaire (2009), Law's meaning of life: Philosophy, religion, Darwin and the legal person, Hart, ISBN 978-1-84113-866-4
- Naffine, Ngaire (4 April 2019), Criminal law and the man problem, Hart Publishing (published 2019), ISBN 978-1-5099-1801-0

=== As editor ===
- Naffine, Ngaire, ed. (1995), Gender, crime, and feminism, Dartmouth, ISBN 978-1-85521-543-6
- Naffine, Ngaire, ed. (2002), Gender and Justice, Ashgate, ISBN 0754620875
