= Paul McMenamin =

Professor Paul Gerard McMenamin (born 6 October, 1956, in Glasgow, Scotland) is an Australian academic and researcher specialising in the structure and immunology of the eye.

== Education ==
McMenamin completed his secondary schooling at St Leonards' Comprehensive Secondary School, Easterhouse, Glasgow. In 1978, he completed an Honours degree in zoology at the University of Glasgow, Scotland. From 1978 to 1981, he was a research student at Tennent Institute of Ophthalmology in Glasgow. In 1986, he completed his MSc in anatomical sciences at Glasgow and was awarded the highest degree possible at the University of Glasgow by the Faculty of Medicine (D.Sc.) for his work over 27 years on the anatomy, pathology and immunology of the eye. He taught anatomical sciences including histology, neuroanatomy, embryology and topographical anatomy.

== Career ==
From 1983 to 1987, McMenamin was a research assistant at the University of Glasgow's Tennent Institute of Ophthalmology and also a lecturer in the University's Department of Anatomy. From 1987 to 1991 he was a lecturer in the Department of Anatomy and Human Biology at the University of Western Australia, in Perth. In 1992, he became a senior lecturer and in 1998 was made Associate Professor of the Department of Anatomy and Human Biology. Since 2003, he has been a Professor in the School of Anatomy and Human Biology. From 2002 to 2004 he was an Honorary Visiting Professor in the Department of Ophthalmology at the University of Auckland. From 2004 until 2007 he was the Associate Dean of Teaching and Learning at UWA's Faculty of Medicine and Dentistry. In 2007, he was an Honorary Professor at the Lions Eye Institute's Centre for Ophthalmology and Vision Sciences, and in 2008 he spent his sabbatical year at the institute. He was awarded the highest degree of D.Sc (Medicine) by Glasgow University in 2010. In 2009, he was given life membership of WAMSS (Western Australian Medical Students' Society) in recognition of his teaching of anatomy. He was appointed as Professor of Anatomy and Director of Centre for Human Anatomy Education in the Department of Anatomy & Developmental Biology at Monash University in Melbourne in early 2010. Prof. McMenamin retired in Feb 2020 and was appointed as Emeritus Professor in March 2020.

== Publications ==
McMenamin has published more than 170 papers in journals including the J.Exp Med., Journal of Immunology, Investigative Ophthalmology and Visual Science, British Journal of Ophthalmology, Medical Journal of Australia, J.Comp Neurol, and 'Nature Reviews Neuroscience'. He has an H-Index of 55 and over 11,000 citations (as of Jan 2023). He is the co-author (with J.V. Forrester, A. Dick and W.R. Lee) of The Eye: Basic Sciences in Practice, published by W.B. Saunders (Ed 3 in December 2007 and translated into Chinese), which has sold over 8000 copies and is now in its 5th Edition. His anatomical charts include The Anatomy of the Greyhound (July 1995), The Anatomy of the Horse (March 1996), and The Surgical Anatomy of the Pelvis (September 2006) (anatomycharts.com.au). His work on innovative 3D printing of replicas of normal human anatomical prosections and their use in teaching is highly cited. He has developed VR and AR applications for anatomy educations. Monash 3D Anatomy series 1.0, 1.1 and 2.0 are available on 'Sectra' tables globally along with curricular material which supports the use of the 3D data sets. Toltech recently licensed the 3D data and has created a VR platform to augment their VH Dissector software

== Awards and recognition ==
McMenamin won the Premier's Science Award for Excellence in Teaching (Tertiary) in 2007, in Australia, partly for his novel use of body painting as a teaching tool in his medical anatomy classes. He has also won University and faculty Excellence in Teaching Awards (2002, 2005, 2007). He has been invited to run workshops in Prague, Bangkok and other countries and visited Liberia in 2016 to donate a complete set of 3D printed replicas for the medical school in Monrovia.

He was appointed a Member of the Order of Australia (AM) in the 2023 Australia Day Honours for "his significant service to tertiary medical education".

== Sources ==
=== 2017 to present ===
1. McMenamin, PG. Art and Anatomy in the Renaissance: are the lessons still relevant today. ANZ Journal of Surgery, Oct 2021. doi: 10.1111/ans.17268

2. Dando SJ, Kazanis R, McMenamin PG. (2021) Myeloid Cells in the Mouse Retina and Uveal Tract Respond Differently to Systemic Inflammatory Stimuli. Invest Ophthalmol Vis Sci. 2021 Aug 2;62(10).

3. Power J, Dempsey P, Barry D, Slater G, McMenamin P, McNicholas M. (2021) Radiology perspective on anatomy teaching in Australia and New Zealand. Surg Radiol Anat. 2021 Aug 10. doi: 10.1007/s00276-021-02811-9. Online ahead of print. PMID: 34378106.

4. Jiao H, Ivanusic JJ, McMenamin PG, Chinnery HR. (2021) Distribution of Corneal TRPV1 and Its Association With Immune Cells During Homeostasis and Injury. Invest Ophthalmol Vis Sci. 2021 Jul 1;62(9):6. doi: 10.1167/iovs.62.9.6. PMID: 34232260

5. Weatherall AD, Rogerson MD, Quayle MR, Cooper MG, McMenamin PG, Adams JW. (2020). A Novel 3-Dimensional Printing Fabrication Approach for the Production of Pediatric Airway Models. Anesth Analg.2020 Nov 10. doi: 10.1213/ANE.0000000000005260. Online ahead of print

6. Forrester JV, Dick A, McMenamin PG, Roberts F. Pearlman, E (2021) “The Eye: Basic Sciences in Practice”. Published by: WB Saunders, London. 5th Edition. TEXTBOOK:

7. McMenamin PG, Hussey D, Chin D, Alam W, Quayle MR, Coupland SE, Adams JW. (2021) The reproduction of human pathology specimens using three-dimensional (3D) printing technology for teaching purposes. Med Teach.43(2):189-197.

8. Kezic JM, Chrysostomou V, McMenamin PG, Crowston JG. (2020) Effects of age on retinal macrophage responses to acute elevation of intraocular pressure. Exp Eye Res. 2020 Apr;193:107995. doi: 10.1016/j.exer.2020.107995. Epub 2020 Mar 7. PMID: 32156653

9. McMenamin PG, Shields GT, Seyed-Razavi Y, Kalirai H, Insall RH, Machesky LM, Coupland SE. (2020) Melanoblasts Populate the Mouse Choroid Earlier in Development Than Previously Described. Invest Ophthalmol Vis Sci. 61(10):33 (1-9)

10. Jiao H, Naranjo Golborne C, Dando SJ, McMenamin PG, Downie LE, Chinnery HR.(2019). Topographical and Morphological Differences of Corneal Dendritic Cells during Steady State and Inflammation. Ocul Immunol Inflamm. 2019 Aug 20:1-10.

11. Nagassa RG, McMenamin PG, Adams JW, Quayle MR, Rosenfeld JV. (2019) Advanced 3D printed model of middle cerebral artery aneurysms for neurosurgery simulation. 3D Print Med. Aug 1;5(1):11.

12. Kezic JM, McMenamin PG. (2019) Systemic exposure to CpG-ODN elicits low-grade inflammation in the retina. Exp Eye Res. 186:107708

13. McMenamin P. Response to: Crisp K and Venning S, Davies R, and Dharmasaroja P. (2019) Med Teach. 41(8):966-967.

14. Jiao H, Naranjo Golborne C, Dando SJ, McMenamin PG, Downie LE, Chinnery HR. (2019) Topographical and Morphological Differences of Corneal Dendritic Cells during Steady State and Inflammation. Ocul Immunol Inflamm. 20:1-10

15. Ratinam, R., Quayle, M., Crock. J., Lazarus, M, Fogg Q., McMenamin PG. (2019) Challenges in creating dissectible anatomical 3D prints for surgical teaching. J Anat. 2019 234(4):419-437

16. Dando, S.J., Chinnery, H., McMenamin, P.G. (2019) Regional and functional heterogeneity of antigen presenting cells in the mouse brain and meninges. Glia. 2019 May;67(5):935-949.

17. McMenamin, P.G., Saban, D. Dando, S.J. (2019) Immune cells in the retina and choroid: two different tissue environments that require different defenses and surveillance. Progress Retinal Eye Research. 70:85-98.

18. Forrester JV, McMenamin PG, Dando SJ. (2018) CNS infection and immune privilege Nat Rev Neurosci. 2018. 11:655-671.

19. Miyamoto, Y., Whiley, P.A.F., Goh, H.Y. Wong, C., Higgins, G., Tachibana, T., McMenamin, P.G., Mayne, L., Loveland, K.L. (2018) The Stk35 locus contributes to normal gametogenesis and encodes a lncRNA responsive to oxidative stress. Biology Open Biol Open. 2018 Aug 6;7(8).

20. Luca Fiorenza, Robin Yong, Sarbin Ranjitkar, Toby Hughes, Michelle Quayle, Paul G. McMenamin, John Kaidonis, Grant C. Townsend, Justin W. Adams. (2018) Technical Note: The use of 3D printing in dental anthropology collections. American Journal of Physical Anthropology. 2018 Oct;167(2):400-406.

21. McMenamin, P.G., McLachlan, J., Wilson, A., McBride, J.M., Pickering, J., Evans, D., Winkelman, A. (2018) “Do we really need cadavers anymore to learn anatomy in undergraduate medicine?” Medical Teacher 2018 Sep 28:1-10.

22. Young JC, Quayle MR, Adams JW, Bertram JW, and McMenamin PG. (2019) Three-dimensional Printing of Archived Human Fetal Material for Teaching Purposes. Anatomical Sciences Education 12(1):90-96.

23. Bennett, D., McMenamin, P., Pacilli, M. Clarnette, T., Ramesh M Nataraja. (2018) Novel application of additive manufacturing techniques for paediatric choledochal malformations. J Paed Child Health. 2018 Jul;54(7):807-809.

24. Ravichandran, S., McMenamin P.G. (2018) The rebirthing of the Kevin O' Day animal slides collection. Clin Exp Ophthalmol. May;46(4):439-441. https://ilearn.med.monash.edu.au/static/VirtualSlides/ComparativeOccularAnatomy/index.html

25. Coles, J, Myburgh, E., Brewer, J., McMenamin, PG. (2017) Where are we? The anatomy of the murine cortical meninges revisited for intravital imaging, immunology, and clearance of waste from the brain. Progress in Neurobiology Review. Sep; 156:107-148.

26. Chinnery, HR, McMenamin, P.G., Dando, S. (2017). Macrophage physiology in the eye. Pflügers Archiv Pflugers Arch. 2017 2017 Apr;469(3-4):501-515. Review.

27. McMenamin, P.G., Naranjo Golborne, C., Chen, X., Wheaton, B., Dando, S. (2017) The unique paired retinal vessels of the gray short-tailed opossum (Monodelphis domestica) and their relationship to astrocytes and microglial cells. Anatomical Record. 300(8):1391-1400.
