= David A. Hensher =

Australian transport economist (born 1947)

- Born: July 31, 1947 (age 79); Bromley, Kent, England
- Citizenship: UK, Australia
- Education: University of New South Wales (BCom Hons I; PhD)
- Known for: Stated- and revealed-preference methods; applied discrete-choice models; road-user charging
- Awards: Member of the Order of Australia (2023) · IATBR Lifetime Achievement Award (2009) · Engineers Australia Transport Medal (2006) · John Shaw Medal (2019) · Fellow of the Academy of Social Sciences in Australia (1995)
- Scientific career
- Fields: Transport economics; discrete-choice modelling
- Workplaces: University of Sydney (Institute of Transport and Logistics Studies)
- Thesis: The Consumer's Choice Function: A Study of Traveller Behaviour and Values (1972)

David Alan Hensher (born 31 July 1947) is an Australian transport economist and academic. He is Professor of Management and the founding Director of the Institute of Transport and Logistics Studies (ITLS) at the University of Sydney Business School. Hensher is widely regarded as a pioneer of discrete-choice modelling in transport analysis; his 2003 survey of the mixed logit model remains one of the field’s most-cited papers. According to Google Scholar, he has an h-index above 124 and more than 80,000 citations, placing him among the most-cited economists of his generation.

== Early life and education ==
Hensher was born in Bromley, Kent and educated in Kenya, England and Australia. He completed a Bachelor of Commerce with first-class honours at the University of New South Wales in 1969 and a PhD in economics at the same institution in 1972. A Nuffield–St Cross post-doctoral fellowship took him to the Transport Studies Unit, University of Oxford, in 1975–76.

== Academic career ==
After lectureships at Macquarie University and consulting appointments, Hensher joined the University of Sydney in 1988. Two years later he founded ITLS, which is rated “well above world standard” (ERA level 5) in transport research. Under his leadership the institute has become a leading centre for graduate education and industry engagement, and Hensher has supervised more than 100 doctoral and master’s theses.

== Research and contributions ==
Hensher’s research spans travel-behaviour analysis, public-transport policy, mobility-as-a-service and road-user charging, but his most enduring impact lies in discrete-choice modelling. His early book Applied Discrete-Choice Modelling (1981) offered the first practical guide to estimating multinomial-logit models, while Stated Choice Methods (2000) systematised experimental design for stated-preference surveys. With colleagues John Rose and William Greene he later published Applied Choice Analysis (2005,2015), a widely used graduate text. Hensher’s empirical work has influenced the appraisal of major infrastructure and the design of bus-rapid-transit systems worldwide, and his 2003 review article on the mixed logit model is cited more than 2,900 times.

== Honours and recognition ==
- Member of the Order of Australia (AM), 2023, for “significant service to transport and to supply-chain management”.
- Fellow of the Academy of Social Sciences in Australia (FASSA), elected 1995.
- Lifetime Achievement Award, International Association of Travel Behaviour Research (IATBR), 2009.
- Transport Medal, Engineers Australia, 2006.
- John Shaw Medal, Roads Australia, 2019.
- In 2021 an annual prize was established and named in honour of David for best paper in transport demand modelling at the Australasian Transport Research Forum (ATRF)

== Selected works ==
- Hensher, D.A. & Johnson, L.W. Applied Discrete-Choice Modelling. Croom Helm, 1981.
- Louviere, J.J.; Hensher, D.A.; Swait, J.D. Stated Choice Methods: Analysis and Applications. Cambridge University Press, 2000.
- Hensher, D.A.; Rose, J.M.; Greene, W.H. Applied Choice Analysis: A Primer (2nd ed.). Cambridge University Press, 2015.
- Hensher, D.A.; Greene, W.H. “The mixed logit model: the state of practice.” Transportation 30 (2): 133–176 (2003).
