= Lone White =

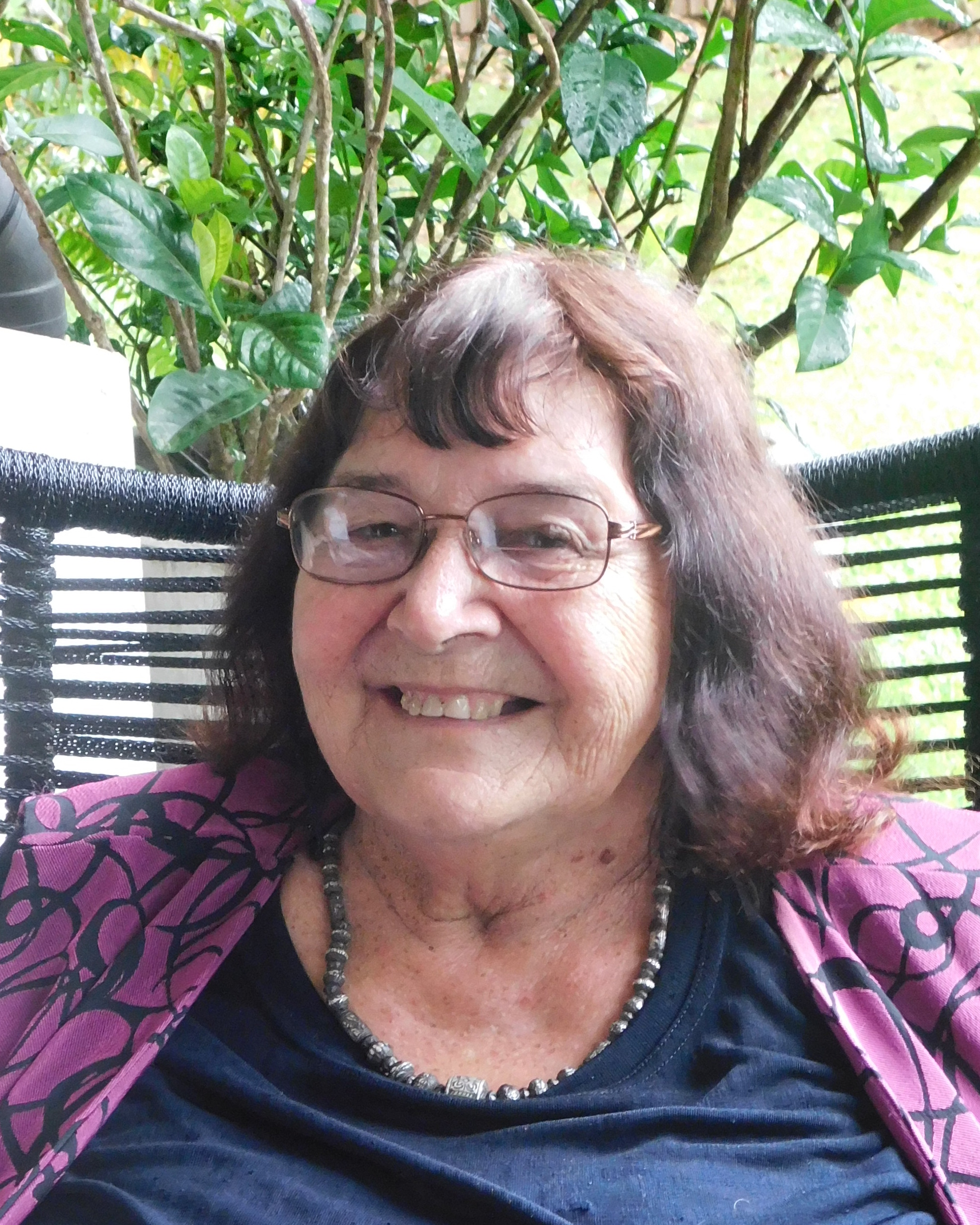
- Lone White 2022
- Born: 1942 (age 83–84); Viborg, Denmark
- Education: Cairns Technical and Further Education College & Kelvin Grove College, Brisbane
- Known for: Ceramic art, community arts advocacy
- Notable work: Stoneware Vase 1983 & Lasting Impressions Ceramic Mural 1988"
- Awards: Order of Australia (OAM)
- Website: https://www.lonewhite-ceramics.com/

Lone White OAM (born 1942) is a Cairns, Far North Queensland based ceramic artist who has been awarded the Order of Australia Medal "for service to the creative arts as a ceramicist"

== Background ==
Lone White was born in Viborg, Denmark. She studied at the University of Copenhagen. Later, when she was living in Papua New Guinea, while in Bougainville, she became intrigued watching village pottery being made. She moved to Cairns from Papua New Guinea in 1978.

== Career ==
Since the 1980s, Lone White has produced ceramic artworks from Queensland's Far North, that has been shown in local, national, and international exhibitions

Her ceramic artworks are represented in private and public collections including:

- the Australian National University, Canberra
- the National Gallery of Australia (Craft Australia slide database)
- the Sanbao Ceramic Art Institute, Jingdezhen, China
- the Delhi Blue Pottery Trust, India
- the Queensland Government Collection
- the Cairns City Collection

== Service ==
=== Ceramics ===
Lone White joined the Cairns Potters Club in 1978, four years after the club was formed, and has been a member ever since.

It was reported, as part of the Potters Club's 50 year's celebrations in 2024, that Lone White had been president for the most of those 50 years and during that time, under her leadership, ceramics in Far North Queensland has grown, the numbers of ceramacists coming through the Cairns Potters Club was still growing, and by the time they were celebrating 50 years, the club had held 16 National 'Melting Pot' exhibitions.

The club's National Jubilee 'Melting Pot' exhibition was a celebration of all that had been achieved for ceramics by what is one of Cairns' longest running artists initiatives for Far North Queensland.

=== Art gallery ===
In the 1980s, Lone White played an active role in a successful Far North Queensland regional campaign to establish a public Regional Art Gallery in Cairns (i.e. Cairns Regional Art Gallery), including, in 1987, coordinating the publication of the book "Art in North Queensland":

- with a forward from the Mayor of Cairns, Alderman Ron E Davis, commending the art works contained in the publication as making the case for establishing a public art gallery
- with an explicit endorsement by then Chairman of Trustees, Queensland Art Galleries, R Austin, noting the absence of, and identifying a need for a public art gallery to display the art of Far North Queensland

=== Arts advocacy ===
In the 1990s Lone White was a founding member of the Visual Arts Association of Far North Queensland being an organization that has since linked art organizations across the Far North Queensland fostering awareness of the region's visual arts and artists, also raising issues relating to the development of visual arts in the region.

Lone has edited a Visual Arts Newsletter since 1993 and has appeared in the media as the President of the Visual Arts Association over the years, for instance:

- Wivell, Danaella (23 June 2018). "Artists denied public expressions of interest for CPAC". The Cairns Post. News Corp Australia.
- Vue, Toby (13 February 2021). "Far North arts advocate Lone White raises concerns about Cairns Art Gallery". The Cairns Post. News Corp Australia.

== Honours ==
In 2011 Lone White received an Australia Day Award for Arts and Culture and in 2023 she was awarded an Order of Australia Medal (OAM) for her service to the creative arts

== Publications ==
=== Newsletters ===
- VAA Newsletter (Editor: Lone White, 1993–present).

=== Articles ===
- White, Lone (July 2017). "Community: Exploring clay as a canvas". The Journal of Australian Ceramics. 56 (2). The Australian Ceramics Association: 94. doi:10.3316/informit.040631268349597.
- White, Lone (July 2023). "Inspired forms". The Journal of Australian Ceramics. 62 (2). The Australian Ceramics Association: 126–127. doi:10.3316/informit.307246342293901.

=== Books ===
- Cairns Art Society (1987). Art in North Queensland - selected works from the Cairns City Collection. Cairns: Cairns Art Society. pp. 41, 86. ISBN 0-7316-0624-8.
- Cairns Potters Club (1990). Lasting Impressions: A Ceramic Mural (Booklet). Cairns, Qld: Cairns Potters Club. – Commemorative booklet - 1988 Bicentennial ceramic mural project.
- White, Lone (2004). White, Bill; Gurtner, Yetta (eds.). Three Decades of Ceramics in Far North Queensland: An Informal History of the Cairns Potters Club. Cairns, Qld: Cairns Potters Club. ISBN 0-646-44441-7.
