= Pat Dudgeon =

Australian Aboriginal psychologist

Professor Pat Dudgeon AM FAHA FAHMS
- Born: Darwin, Northern Territory, Australia
- Education: Curtin University, Murdoch University

Patricia Lynette Dudgeon is an Aboriginal Australian psychologist, Fellow of the Australian Psychological Society, and a research professor at the University of Western Australia's School of Indigenous Studies. Her area of research includes Indigenous social and emotional wellbeing and suicide prevention. She is actively involved with the Aboriginal community, having an ongoing commitment to social justice for Indigenous people. Dudgeon has participated in numerous state and national committees, councils, task groups and community service activities in both a voluntary and professional capacity.

== Early life and education ==
Patricia Lynette Dudgeon has Bardi and Gija heritage.

She studied at the Western Australian Institute of Technology, Curtin University and Murdoch University, graduating with BAppSc, GDip (Psych), and Doctor of Philosophy (Psychology).

== Career ==
Dudgeon has been a prominent and influential member of the psychology profession since graduating in 1985 as Australia's first Indigenous psychologist. She was the first Indigenous convenor of the Australian Psychological Society (APS) Interest Group on Aboriginal Issues, People and Psychology, and the founding Chair of the Australian Indigenous Psychologists Association and remains a committee member.

Before joining the University of Western Australia (UWA) in 2007, Dudgeon was the head of the Centre for Aboriginal Studies at Curtin University for 19 years, leading the field in providing culturally appropriate education.

In 2007 she was appointed as research professor in the School of Indigenous Studies at UWA and director of the Centre of Best Practice in Aboriginal and Torres Strait Islander Suicide Prevention at the Poche Centre for Indigenous Health at UWA. She is lead chief investigator of a Million Minds grant.

During her career, Dudgeon has taken prominent leadership roles in national and state groups such as the National Mental Health Commission, the Aboriginal and Torres Strait Islander Leadership Group for the state and national Mental Health Commissions in Australia, is co-chair of the National Ministerial Aboriginal Torres Strait Islander Mental Health and Suicide Prevention Advisory Group to the PM&C and Department of Health, and is a member of the Gayaa Dhuwi (Proud Spirit) National Advisory Group, which was formed in 2020.

== Honours and awards ==
- 2009: Inducted Batchelor Institute of Indigenous Tertiary Education's Hall of Fame
- 2013: Indigenous Allied Health Australia Lifetime Achievement Award
- 2013: Deadly Award for Excellence in Aboriginal and Torres Strait Islander Health in 2013
- 2019/20: Australian Psychological Society's President's Award for Distinguished Contribution to Psychology in Australia
- 2021: Fellow of the Australian Academy of Health and Medical Sciences
- 2023: Appointed Member of the Order of Australia
- 2024: Fellow of the Australian Academy of the Humanities

== Other activities ==
As of 2024 Dudgeon is a patron of the Justice Reform Initiative

== Selected works ==
- Dudgeon, P., Bray, A., & Walker, R. (2020). Self-determination and strengths-based Aboriginal and Torres Strait Islander suicide prevention: An emerging evidence-based approach. In A. Page & W. Stritzke (Eds.) Alternatives to suicide: Beyond risk and toward a life worth living (pp. 237–256). Elsevier. This chapter discusses CIA Dudgeons formative Social and Emotional Wellbeing Framework that highlights how colonisation and social determinants impact on Indigenous wellbeing.
- Dudgeon, P., Milroy, J., Calma, T., Luxford, Y., Ring, I., Walker, R., Cox, A., Georgatos, G., & Holland, C. (2016). "Solutions That Work: What the Evidence and Our People Tell Us. Aboriginal and Torres Strait Islander Suicide Prevention Evaluation Project Report." UWA. This report provided a blue print for Indigenous suicide prevention, is cited in most government reports/policies and used extensively by Indigenous community groups.
- Dudgeon, P., Calma, T., Brideson, T., & Holland, C. (2016). The Gayaa Dhuwi (Proud Spirit) Declaration - A call to action for Aboriginal and Torres Strait Islander leadership in the Australian mental health system. Advances in Mental Health: Promotion, Prevention and Early Intervention, 14. This paper discusses the role of political and social factors in mental health and highlights the need for a balance of clinical and culturally-informed mental health system responses.
- Dudgeon, P., & Walker, R. (2015). Decolonising Australian psychology: Discourses, strategies, and practice. Journal of Social and Political Psychology, 3, 276-297. Articulates social and emotional wellbeing as a culturally appropriate paradigm to describe Aboriginal selfhood, history, social determinants and the need for practice to be culturally safe.
- Dudgeon, P., Milroy, H., & Walker, R. (Eds.). (2014). Working together: Aboriginal and Torres Strait Islander mental health and wellbeing principles and practice. (2nd ed.). Canberra, ACT: Commonwealth of Australia.
