= Genetics of migraine =

Migraine is often hereditary. It is estimated that 60% of migraine cases are caused by genetics. The role of natural selection in the development of migraines is not known. Fitness-impairing disorders, including migraines, tend to disappear as a result of natural selection, and their frequency decreases to near the rate of spontaneous mutation. However, it is estimated that migraines affect 15-20% of the population and is increasing. This could suggest that a central nervous system (CNS) susceptible to severe, intermittent headache has been linked to an important survival or reproductive advantage. Five possible evolutionary explanations exist: i) migraine as a defence mechanism, ii) migraine as a result of conflicts with other organisms, iii) migraine as a result of novel environmental factors, iv) migraine as a compromise between genetic harms and benefits, and v) headache as a design constraint. These considerations allow the treatment and prevention of migraine to be approached from an evolutionary medicine perspective.

== Heritability ==
Studies of twins indicate a 34% to 51% genetic influence on the likelihood to develop migraine. This genetic relationship is stronger for migraines with aura than for migraines without aura. A number of specific variants of genes increase the risk by a small to moderate amount.

Single gene disorders that result in migraines are rare. One of these is known as familial hemiplegic migraine, a type of migraine with aura, which is inherited in an autosomal dominant fashion. Four genes have been shown to be involved in familial hemiplegic migraine. Three of these genes are involved in ion transport. The fourth is an axonal protein associated with the exocytosis complex. Another genetic disorder associated with migraine is CADASIL syndrome or cerebral autosomal dominant arteriopathy with subcortical infarcts and leukoencephalopathy.

== Evolution ==
=== Defence mechanism ===
The tendency to develop head pain when faced with a stressor or strong sensory stimuli can be explained in two ways. First, it may be a side effect of other CNS processes that provide important evolutionary advantages. One example is counteracting the dilation of cranial arteries to counteract dangerous vasoconstriction in the brain. Second, migraine may be an example of how pain has evolved to encourage organisms to avoid potentially harmful situations. Olfactory-induced migraines (migraines stimulated by strong smells) have been explained as an attempt to interrupt the entry of toxins into the brain via the olfactory nerve. Similarly, the low threshold for nausea and vomiting may be a mechanism to enhance the elimination of ingested toxins in food. Migraineurs have a lower prevalence of malignant neoplasms in the brain than controls, suggesting that migraines are protective against tumours. However, the mechanism responsible for this difference is unknown.

=== Conflicts with other organisms ===
A headache-prone CNS may have resulted from interactions with other organisms in two ways. The first possibility is that migraine offers an advantage to the organism in fighting infection by increasing blood flow to the brain. The second possibility is that certain pathogens evolved to cause headaches as a way of speeding their transmission to other organisms. Finally, migraine may benefit neither the host nor the pathogen, but may simply be the result of certain infections. This last explanation is concordant with the apparent negative impact of migraine on human fitness.

=== Novel environmental factors ===
Modern environmental factors, with an increased sensory overload, may be especially permissive of the expression of genes that predispose to the disorder. If so, natural selection may not have had a chance to eliminate these genes yet. The increasing prevalence of migraine is easily a result of increased known triggers, such as bright light, loud noise, altered sleep/wake patterns, and emotional stress. This is an example of mismatch theory, which states that the current environment differs from the evolutionary environment of a particular trait.

=== Genetic harms and benefits ===
Migraine is influenced on a polygenetic level (controlled by multiple genes). Therefore, researchers have theorized that migraine is a trade-off and that it exists as a spectrum of susceptibility, with the majority of the population falling in the "heterozygous" zone between the two extremes of experiencing no headache and experiencing frequent, incapacitating headache. While it is not known for certain how or whether mild forms of the disorder would enhance survival, there is evidence of enhanced visual sensitivity in family members of migraineurs. Additionally, this compromise theory may explain the higher prevalence among women, especially pregnant women and women of reproductive age (25-40). The avoidance of threatening environments is historically more important to the reproductive success of women. The compromise between genetic harms and benefits is commonly seen in other disorders, such as cystic fibrosis and sickle cell anemia.

=== Headache as a design construct ===
Finally, migraine may be a component of imperfect central nervous system design. Evidence has suggested a dysfunction of pain-inhibitory pathways in migraine and discordant interaction between the ancient brain stem design and the more evolved neocortex. The brain stem may be unable to suppress excessive input from higher brain centres.
