= Lucette Aldous =

Australian ballerina (1938–2021)

Lucette Aldous AC
- Born: 26 September 1938; Auckland, New Zealand
- Died: 5 June 2021 (aged 82); Perth, Western Australia
- Education: Royal Ballet School
- Occupations: Dancer; teacher
- Spouses: Maurice Evelyn Forbes Fitzmaurice (m. 1960; div. 1972) Alan Alder (m. 1972)
- Children: 1
- Career
- Former groups: Ballet Rambert, The Royal Ballet, Australian Ballet

Lucette Aldous AC (26 September 1938 – 5 June 2021) was an Australian prima ballerina during her performing years. She was the resident principal dancer with The Australian Ballet, and well known for performing the role of Kitri in the film of Rudolf Nureyev's production of Don Quixote, receiving many honours for her years of performance including being appointed AC in the 2018 Australia Day Honours list.

== Early life ==
Lucette Aldous was born in Auckland, New Zealand, in September 1938 and moved to Perth, Western Australia, when she was four months old. She started her training at the age of 3 in 1941 and studied under Australian teacher Phyllis Danaher. In 1955 Aldous received a scholarship to attend the Royal Ballet School in London. She later performed in a European tour as part of the Royal Ballet partnering Rudolf Nureyev in The Nutcracker.

Aldous later moved to Sydney for further ballet training, where in addition she attended Randwick High School. She claimed to have had a photographic memory, excelling in English, physiology, and business. As such she became the dux of the school and later won a business scholarship which she chose not to accept, as after three years training in Sydney she won the Frances Scully scholarship to attend the Royal Ballet School in 1955. In order to improve her flexibility she would often have lessons with a teacher named De Voss, who taught her Martha Graham floor work in order to get looser before barre work. When she reached London she and her family lived in Notting Hill Gate.

== Career ==
=== London ===
Aldous began her professional career dancing Variations on a Theme in Britain's oldest dance company, Ballet Rambert, in 1957 under Dame Peggy van Praagh at the Theatre Royal. While performing at Rambert she danced many major roles, including Night Shadow, Façade, and The Wise Monkey. Her notable roles included Mazurka in Les Sylphides and Kitri in Don Quixote. Aldous also toured with Ballet Rambert in 1957 to the People's Republic of China after Mao Zedong opened the country up. The British Consulate acknowledged that the tour would be one of the first introductions of western ballet to the Chinese people and as such informed Ballet Rambert that they were representing the country in their performances. Aldous left Ballet Rambert in 1963.

Following her departure from Ballet Rambert, Aldous danced with the London Festival Ballet.

=== The Australian Ballet ===
Aldous returned to Australia in 1970 and made her debut with the Australian Ballet as a guest artist, being appointed resident principal artist in 1971. She performed Fool on the Hill, Dame Gillian Lynne's production for the Australian Ballet and Australian Broadcasting Corporation in 1976.

In 1973 she performed the lead role in The Sleeping Beauty at the Sydney Opera House.

Later in 1975 Ronald Hynd created the role of Valencienne for Aldous for his production of The Merry Widow for the Australian Ballet.

=== Don Quixote ===
Rudolf Nureyev had partnered Aldous in various productions of Don Quixote in Europe, and when he created a production for the Australian company she was his natural choice for Kitri. The production was filmed in 1973 and remains in the Australian Ballet's repertoire.

== Post-performance career ==
=== Floor barre ===
In the mid-1970s Aldous retired from full-time performing and began to teach at the Australian Ballet School in Melbourne. She was an advocate of Boris Knyazev's floor barre as a system of training and taught it at the Australian Ballet School.

Aldous recorded and documented the exercises involved in the system of training for future generations as she considered this system a valuable conditioning and injury preventative regime. She was concerned with the longevity of the style and that if not properly documented it would then be forgotten and as such saw it as her duty to ensure that the style was properly preserved.

To further study the philosophy and teaching methods behind the Vaganova system she went to St Petersburg with her husband Alan Alder where the system is supported by the Vaganova Academy.

=== Western Australian Academy of Performing Arts ===
In 1982 Aldous and Alder both took opportunities at the Western Australian Academy of Performing Arts (WAAPA) at Edith Cowan University in Perth. WAAPA is one of the major performing arts schools in Western Australia.

Alder was given the role of managing the new dance department and Aldous was a teacher in the academy. While there she directed a ballet rendition of Romeo and Juliet and oversaw pieces such as Giselle, Sacred Space, The Sisters, and Summer Solstice. By 2018 Aldous had retired from full time work at WAAPA although she continued as a guest teacher.

== Personal life ==
Lucette Aldous was married to barrister Maurice Fitzmaurice from 1960, divorcing in 1972.

She then married fellow ballet dancer Alan Alder in 1972, and they had one daughter, Floeur, also a dancer. The couple were both independently recognised in 2004 as Western Australian State Living Treasures, being recognised for their outstanding contribution to dance and dedication as advocates for the development of dance in Western Australia.

On 5 June 2021, Aldous died in Perth, Western Australia, at the age of 82.

== Awards ==
- Honorary Doctorate of Letters – Edith Cowan University 1999
- Services to Dance – Australian Dance Awards 2001
- Lifetime Achievement Award – Australian Dance Awards 2009

== Honours ==
Aldous was made a Companion of the Order of Australia (AC), the highest award in Australia, in the Queen's Birthday Honours List in 2018

== Bibliography ==
- (n.d.). Retrieved from https://michellemahrerfilms.com/tag/lucette-aldous
- (n.d.). Retrieved from https://trove.nla.gov.au/people/492056?c=people
- Aldous, Lucette. (n.d.). Retrieved from https://www.oxfordreference.com/view/10.1093/acref/9780195173697.001.0001/acref-9780195173697-e-0025
- Aldous, Lucette. (n.d.). Retrieved from https://www.oxfordreference.com/view/10.1093/acref/9780199563449.001.0001/acref-9780199563449-e-43
- Ausdance, & Ausdance. (n.d.). Lucette Aldous made Companion of the Order of Australia (AC) " Ausdance: Dance Advocacy. Retrieved from https://ausdance.org.au/news/article/lucette-aldous-made-companion-of-the-order-of-australia-ac
- Australia Dancing – Aldous, Lucette (1938 – ). (n.d.). Retrieved from https://web.archive.org/web/20100426120454/http://australiadancing.org/subjects/77.html
- Dame Lucette Aldous A.C. (12 September 2020). Retrieved from https://www.maarts.com.au/patrons/dame-lucette-aldous/
- Lendle, G. (n.d.). Double Reality in Roberto Gerhard's ballet Don Quixote. 1st International Roberto Gerhard Conference. Retrieved from http://www.robertogerhard.com/wp-content/uploads/2011/10/5-Lendle.pdf
- Liebert, M. (1991). Improving growth-Kniaseff, Boris and his technique. Ballet International, 54–55.
- Lucette Aldous. (n.d.). Retrieved from https://michellepotter.org/tag/lucette-aldous
- Lucette Aldous. (n.d.). Retrieved from https://www.oxfordreference.com/view/10.1093/oi/authority.20110803095401427
- Phillips, M., Pacific, W. D., Author Maggi Phillips Associate Professor Maggi Phillips PhD (1944–2015) was coordinator of Research and Creative Practice at the Western Australian Academy of Performing Arts, Maggi Phillips Associate Professor Maggi Phillips PhD (1944–2015) was coordinator of Research and Creative Practice at the Western Australian Academy of Performing Arts, Phillips, M., Associate Professor Maggi Phillips PhD (1944–2015) was coordinator of Research and Creative Practice at the Western Australian Academy of Performing Arts, & Phillips, V. M. (1 June 2002). 'Crazy link-ups all over the place' " Ausdance: Dance Advocacy. Retrieved from https://ausdance.org.au/articles/details/crazy-link-ups-all-over-the-place
- Radbourne, J. (n.d.). The Australian Ballet – A Spirit of Its Own. International Journal of Arts Management. Retrieved from https://www.jstor.org/stable/pdf/41064702.pdf.
- ROMANCE FOR LUCETTE AND ALAN – The Australian Women's Weekly (1933–1982) – 14 July 1971. (n.d.). Retrieved from https://trove.nla.gov.au/newspaper/article/44556432
- University, W. (1974). Alumni Magazine April 1974. Whitworth Alumni Magazine. Retrieved from https://digitalcommons.whitworth.edu/alumnimagazine/316.
- Radbourne, J. (n.d.). The Australian Ballet – A Spirit of Its Own. International Journal of Arts Management. Retrieved from https://www.jstor.org/stable/pdf/41064702.pdf.
