= The Merry Widow (ballet) =

1975 ballet by Ronald Hynd

- Choreographer: Ronald Hynd
- Music: Franz Lehár (adapted by John Lanchbery and Alan Abbott)
- Based on: The Merry Widow operetta
- Premiere: 13 November 1975; Palais Theatre, Melbourne, Victoria, Australia
- Original ballet company: The Australian Ballet
- Setting: Paris
- Created for: The Australian Ballet
- Genre: Neoclassical ballet
- Type: classical ballet

The Merry Widow ballet is a 1975 adaptation of Franz Lehár's 1905 romantic operetta The Merry Widow (Die lustige Witwe).

John Lanchbery and Alan Abbott adapted the score of the operetta for ballet and retained the style of Lehár's orchestration. The arrangement includes the well-known tunes of the operetta: Vilja's song Ich bin eine anständige Frau and the Weibermarsch. This musical arrangement has been used for two ballets: the first was choreographed by Ronald Hynd for The Australian Ballet in 1975, while the second was choreographed by Veronica Paeper for CAPAB (since renamed the Cape Town City Ballet Company) in 1988.

== Ballet choreographed by Ronald Hynd ==
The ballet was created for The Australian Ballet by Sir Robert Helpmann (a principal dancer and choreographer), who obtained permission from the heirs of the composer and the librettists (Viktor Léon and Leo Stein), by special arrangement with Glocken Verlag Ltd. of London. The scenario and staging were designed by Helpmann, with the choreography by Ronald Hynd. The orchestration was by John Lanchbery (who was then the musical director of The Australian Ballet) and his colleague Alan Abbott. The designer was Desmond Heeley.

The ballet had its world premiere on 13 November 1975 at the Palais Theatre in Melbourne, with Marilyn Rowe (Hanna), John Meehan (Danilo), Lucette Aldous (Valencienne), Kelvin Coe (Camille), Colin Peasley (Baron Mirko Zeta) and Ray Powell (Njegus). The performance was conducted by John Lanchbery. It premiered in Sydney at the Regent Theatre.

In 1976, Dame Margot Fonteyn performed the rôle of Hanna as a guest dancer at The Australian Ballet and continued with the rôle, alternating with Marilyn Fay Jones when the company took their production to England.

Like the operetta, the ballet has also become very popular and has been adopted into the repertoires of many companies, including the National Ballet of Canada, the Royal Danish Ballet, the American Ballet Theatre, the Houston Ballet, the Vienna State Ballet, and Pacific Northwest Ballet.

== Ballet choreographed by Veronica Paeper ==
Veronica Paeper choreographed a new version of this ballet to the orchestration of John Lanchbery. The ballet had its premiere on 10 September 1988 at the Artscape Theatre Centre, formerly known as the Nico Malan Opera House, in Cape Town, South Africa. The Cape Town City Ballet revived this version in 2008; the principal rôles were danced by guest artists Elza Leimane and Raimond Martinov.

== Ballet rôles ==
- Baron Mirko Zeta – (Pontevedrian Ambassador to France)
- Valencienne – (Baron Zeta's wife)
- Count Danilo Danilovitsch – (Pontevedrian Diplomat - First Secretary of the Pontevedrian Embassy)
- Hanna Glawari – (a wealthy Pontrevedrian widow)
- Count Camille de Rosillon – (French Attaché to the Embassy)
- Njegus – (Private Secretary to the Ambassador)
- Kromow – (Under-secretary at the Embassy)
- Pritschitsch – (Under-secretary at the Embassy)
- Maître d' "Chez Maxim"
- Guests at the Embassy, Pontevedrians, Grisettes, etc.

== Synopsis ==
=== Act 1 ===
==== Scene 1 ====
An ante-room in the Pontevedrian Embassy in Paris in 1905

A ball is to be held that evening at the Pontevedrian Embassy to celebrate the birthday of the Grand Duke, the sovereign of the Grand Duchy of Pontevedro, and Kromow and Pritschitsch are keen to leave their desk work and join the festivities. Camille is also anxious to leave work. However, before they can leave, Njegus arrives and instructs the three men to return to the desk to take care of some extra papers he is carrying. Discovering that Danilo is missing, Njegus enquires where he is, and Kromow and Pritschitsch comment that Danilo is out drinking. Njegus sits at Danilo's post at the desk, and together the four men go through the paperwork, following which Njegus informs them that Pontevedro is bankrupt. Baron Zeta arrives, carrying a telegram and mentioning that a rich Pontevedrian widow, Hanna Glawari, is to attend the embassy ball. The Baron wants Count Danilo to marry the widow so that her money will stay in Pontevedro. Valencienne comes into the room and then everyone drinks to the health of the Duke. The men then leave — except for Camille, who has some extra paperwork to do.

Valencienne, who has deliberately lagged behind the others in their departure, flirts with Camille, trying to distract him from his work. Camille tries to keep on working, but eventually gives up and goes to Valencienne — and then Valencienne half-heartedly keeps showing Camille her wedding ring. While the couple are flirting, Njegus, who has some further work to do, comes back into the room unnoticed, and without noticing the lovers. Suddenly becoming aware of the presence of Camille and Valencienne, Njegus hides in a cupboard underneath the desk. The couple end up on the desk with Camille kissing Valencienne and the two hugging each other, at which point Njegus suddenly confronts them, much to their surprise and embarrassment. Camille leaves immediately. Valencienne pleads with Njegus to keep what he has seen a secret — to which Njegus agrees — and then Valencienne also leaves.

While Njegus is finishing his tasks, Danilo enters the room, having just arrived from Maxim's. Danilo is drunk and is finding it difficult to stand without falling over. Baron Zeta and Valencienne then enter the room — and the Baron, seeing that Danilo has returned to the embassy, attempts, unavailingly, to tell Danilo that he is to marry a wealthy widow. Finally giving up, the Baron asks Njegus to sober Danilo up before the ball.

==== Scene 2 ====
The Ballroom in the Pontevedrian Embassy

The ball begins and Baron Zeta dances with his beautiful wife. However, he has trouble with rheumatism and he asks Camille to dance with Valencienne in his place. Camille does so with enthusiasm, and Njegus, who is watching the pair closely, is unimpressed by the open display of Camille's and Valencienne's affection for each other. The Baron does not seem to notice anything amiss, but he does get upset at the amount of time the two of them dance together, and he makes an effort to remind Camille that Valencienne is married to him.

The widow, Hanna Glawari, arrives, amidst a stir from the hopeful young bachelors. Baron Zeta introduces Hanna to Danilo, not knowing that Hanna and Danilo had previously been romantically involved with each other. Both Hanna and Danilo are stunned to see each other. Danilo is thrilled, and tells Hanna that he loves her, but Hanna accuses him of only wanting her for her money. Upset about this, Danilo mops the sweat from his forehead with a kerchief, which Hanna instantly recognises as a keepsake she had given to Danilo the last time they had seen each other (when Danilo's aristocratic uncle had forbidden their romance and had forbidden Danilo to marry Hanna, because Hanna was a poor peasant girl). Hanna takes back the kerchief from Danilo and then leaves the room. Danilo remembers Hanna the way she used to be — as a young peasant girl — and he remembers, with fondness, the way she had given him the kerchief - these memories are danced as a pas de deux.

When Danilo returns to the ballroom, it is time for the 'ladies choice' dance. Hanna chooses Danilo to dance with, and curtsies to him, expectantly, but, still upset with what Hanna had said to him, Danilo snubs her and dances with somebody else. Feeling hurt because of Danilo's actions, Hanna dances with Camille — an action which upsets Valencienne. Valencienne and Danilo then dance together, and they effect a change of partners. Before Hanna can react, Valencienne and Camille go off together. Eventually, though, Hanna dances with Danilo.

=== Act 2 ===
The garden of Hanna's Villa

The following night, Hanna gives a party in the garden of her Parisian villa, and she and all her guests wear Pontevedrian clothes, so that they can celebrate the birthday of the Grand Duke in Pontevedrian fashion. There are many Pontevedrian folk dances, including one in which Danilo and Hanna dance together — at the end of which Hanna mops her forehead with her kerchief. Later, Hanna returns the kerchief to Danilo in exactly the same way as she had originally given it to him, following which both leave the garden.

Entering the garden together, Camille and Valencienne are no longer concealing their passion for each other. Camille entices Valencienne to enter the pavilion in the garden with him. Njegus, arriving for a meeting in the pavilion with the Baron and Danilo, sees what happens and goes to the pavilion door to peep though the keyhole. Baron Zeta and Danilo arrive, and, seeing Njegus at the door, they go to join him, as they think that Njegus is opening the door. Njegus quickly locks the door, and, when Baron Zeta and Danilo find the door is locked, they demand he unlock the door for them. Njegus refuses to do so. As the Baron and Danilo discuss what to do with Njegus, he breaks away from them and looks around desperately for help. Seeing Hanna, who has just arrived in the area, Njegus explains the situation to her and asks her to change places with Valencienne in the pavilion. Hanna agrees to do so.

Baron Zeta and Danilo catch up with Njegus, and demand that he hand them the key. Shaking his head in refusal, Njegus puts the key in his mouth. Baron Zeta and Danilo pick up Njegus and hold him upside down and shake him until the key drops onto the ground. Baron Zeta picks up the key and he and Danilo then go to the door of the pavilion.

Meanwhile, Hanna changes places with Valencienne through a door on the other side of the pavilion. Hanna presumably explains to Valencienne what is going on, and the escaped Valencienne joins a returning group of friends, so that she will appear innocent.

The Baron opens the door and Camille leaves the pavilion, followed by Hanna. Danilo is stunned to see that Hanna is the woman with Camille, and Hanna states that she and Camille are engaged. Camille looks startled at this unexpected announcement and Valencienne faints with shock at her lover committing himself to another woman. Baron Zeta is horrified at the thought of Pontevedro losing all Hanna's money to a foreigner and also faints. Danilo is furious. Hanna explains to Camille why she pretended that they were engaged, and Camille, looking relieved, smiles.

Baron Zeta, Valencienne and Njegus then leave in a huff. All the guests congratulate Hanna and Camille on their 'engagement' and then leave — followed by the swift departure of Camille. Finally, the jealous Danilo throws down the kerchief and storms off in a rage. The delighted Hanna then picks up the kerchief knowing that Danilo truly loves her.

=== Act 3 ===
Chez Maxim

The maître d' is welcoming his patrons as they arrive, and the waiter rushes around serving drinks.

Camille arrives. Shortly after, Baron Zeta, Valencienne and Njegus arrive, and they openly show their contempt for Camille.

With the fear that Pontevedro will become bankrupt as a result of Hanna's marriage to a non-Pontevedrian, Njegus and Zeta lower the Pontevedrian flags.

Soon after, Danilo arrives and is aggressively approached by Camille. The two men fight, in the middle of which they are both restrained. Then Hanna arrives and, when she accepts the arm of Camille, Danilo wants to hit Camille with his gloves and challenge Camille to a duel. Baron Zeta's eyes are finally opened to what is happening between Camille and Valencienne, when Valencienne shields Camille from the angry Danilo.

Hanna dances with Camille, while Danilo dances with Valencienne. Gradually, however, the dance brings Hanna and Danilo together — and Camille and Valencienne likewise end up together. Resignedly, the upset Baron accepts the romance between his wife and Camille, and the three leave together.

Hanna is left alone in the room, feeling dejected. Then Danilo quietly returns and folds Hanna in his arms, and all ends in blissful happiness. Njegus and Zeta, who have also quietly returned to the room, are delighted at the outcome and raise the Pontevedrian flags on either side of the stage in celebration.

== Television broadcast ==
The Australian Broadcasting Corporation (ABC-TV) recorded a live performance by the Australian Ballet, at Melbourne's State Theatre, on 25 June 1993, with Lisa Pavane (as Hanna Galwari), Steven Heathcote (Count Danilo Danilovitsch), Rebecca Yates (Valencienne), David McAllister (Camille de Rosillon), Colin Peasley (Baron Mirko Zeta), and Ray Powell (Njegus). The ABC broadcast the recording on 27 March 1997, and released it as a video and DVD.

== Ballet music ==
Music for "The Merry Widow" Ballet with John Lanchbery conducting The State Orchestra of Victoria, Australia. (CD cover)

"The Merry Widow" Ballet music was released commercially in 1999 by ABC Classics (ABC 465 426-2), with John Lanchbery conducting the State Orchestra of Victoria. The album was awarded a gold record.

Act I (Scene 1) — An anteroom in the Pontevedrian Embassy

- Introduction
- Camille and Valencienne
- Mazurka (Danilo)

Act I (Scene 2) — The Ballroom of the Pontevedrian Embassy

- Scene change into Ballroom; entrance of Hanna
- Danilo and Hanna ("Vilja")
- Polka (Valencienne and Camille): Finale of Act 1

Act II — The garden of Hanna's villa, the next evening

- Opening Polonaise
- Men's Czardas
- Ladies Dance
- Hanna's National Dance
- Pas de Deux (Hanna and Danilo)
- Guests exit: Love Scene
- Pas de Deux (Camille and Valencienne)
- Finale of Act II

Act III — Maxim's restaurant, several days later

- Opening Polka
- Can Can, Cakewalk and Melos: Finale (Pas de Deux)
