= Kelvin Coe =

Australian ballet dancer

Kelvin Coe OBE (18 September 1946 – 9 July 1992) was an Australian ballet dancer and the first male artist to be promoted from the corps de ballet in the Australian Ballet principal dancer. He died of AIDS-related illness in 1992.

== Dancing career ==
Born in Melbourne, Coe was spotted, at the age of 16, by Dame Peggy van Praagh when she was recruiting for the newly formed Australian Ballet. Within just four years, he became a soloist with the company. He became the company's principal dancer in 1968 and achieved the ultimate position of premier danseur in 1974.

By this time he had achieved fame as one of Australia's top male dancers, whilst at the Australian Ballet and whilst touring overseas in the UK, the US and the USSR. Some of Coe's most notable roles with the Australian Ballet include those of Albrecht in Giselle (1969, 1976, 1986), as Espada in Don Quixote (directed by Rudolf Nureyev), in 1973.

Coe performed with many international female artists including Carla Fracci, Valentina Koslova and Galina Samsova, Maina Gielgud, Eva Evdokimova, Elisabetta Terabust and Margot Fonteyn. He partnered with Australians Elaine Fifield, Marilyn Jones and Marilyn Rowe.

Coe and fellow Australian Marilyn Rowe formed a partnership which won them a silver medal at the 1973 Moscow International Ballet Competition. In 1978, the pair became the first Australian artists to appear as guests of the Bolshoi Ballet when they perform the leading roles of Don Quixote.

In 1974, Coe danced with the London Festival Ballet where he performed Les Sylphides and The Prodigal Son. In that year, he also danced with several American dance companies. He later returned to Australia to dance under ballet director Maina Gielgud in the 1980s.

In October 1981 Coe, reluctantly, became the artists’ spokesperson during a twenty-six-day strike. He believed the settlement offered to the dancers was poor and resigned in December.

Coe joined Graeme Murphy at the Sydney Dance Company in 1982. In 1985, he returned to the faculty of the Australian Ballet School and taught there until 1991.

The Australian Ballet now award the annual Kelvin Coe Memorial Scholarship to promising young ballet artists.

== Honours ==
To mark his contribution to ballet in Australia, Coe was appointed an Officer of the Order of the British Empire in the 1980 Birthday Honours. By the gay community, he is remembered in a panel in the Australian AIDS Quilt.

== Obituaries ==
- Noël Goodwin, The Independent, 11 July 1992
- The New York Times, 16 July 1992
