= Department of Culture and the Arts =

Former government department in Western Australia

Agency overview
- Dissolved: 1 July 2017
- Superseding agency: Department of Local Government, Sports and Cultural Industries
- Jurisdiction: Government of Western Australia

The Department of Culture and the Arts was part of the Government of Western Australia.

== Preceding authorities ==
The earlier governmental agencies or authorities concerning the arts were advisory boards or councils; it was not until 1986 that the department for the Arts was created.

The Department of the Arts was to co-ordinate and review the major cultural institutions, incorporating the Censorship Office and absorbing the activities of the Western Australian Arts Council. The department was given the responsibility of ensuring artistic and financial evaluation and accountability from receipts of arts grants.

It was followed by the Ministry for Culture and the Arts, which existed between 1997 and 2001.

== The department ==
The department was known as the Department of Culture and the Arts and it commenced operating on 1 July 2001 and was amalgamated into the Department of Local Government, Sport and Cultural Industries on 1 July 2017. The Culture and the Arts department portfolio included the Art Gallery of Western Australia, the State Library of Western Australia, the Western Australian Museum, the Perth Theatre Trust, and Screenwest.

== State Living Treasures ==
Former Minister for Arts, The Hon. Peter Foss QC MLC, initiated the State Living Treasures Awards in 1998 to honour artists whose lifetime work had enhanced the artistic and cultural life of Western Australia.

The Minister presented the awards at a special ceremony at Kings Park on Western Australia Proclamation Day, 21 October 1998.

The awards were also presented in 2004 by The Hon. Sheila McHale MLA, former Minister for Culture and the Arts.

In 2015 they were awarded by The Hon. John Day MLA, former Minister for Culture and the Arts at a ceremony at the Art Gallery of Western Australia in October 2015.

=== 2015 Recipients ===
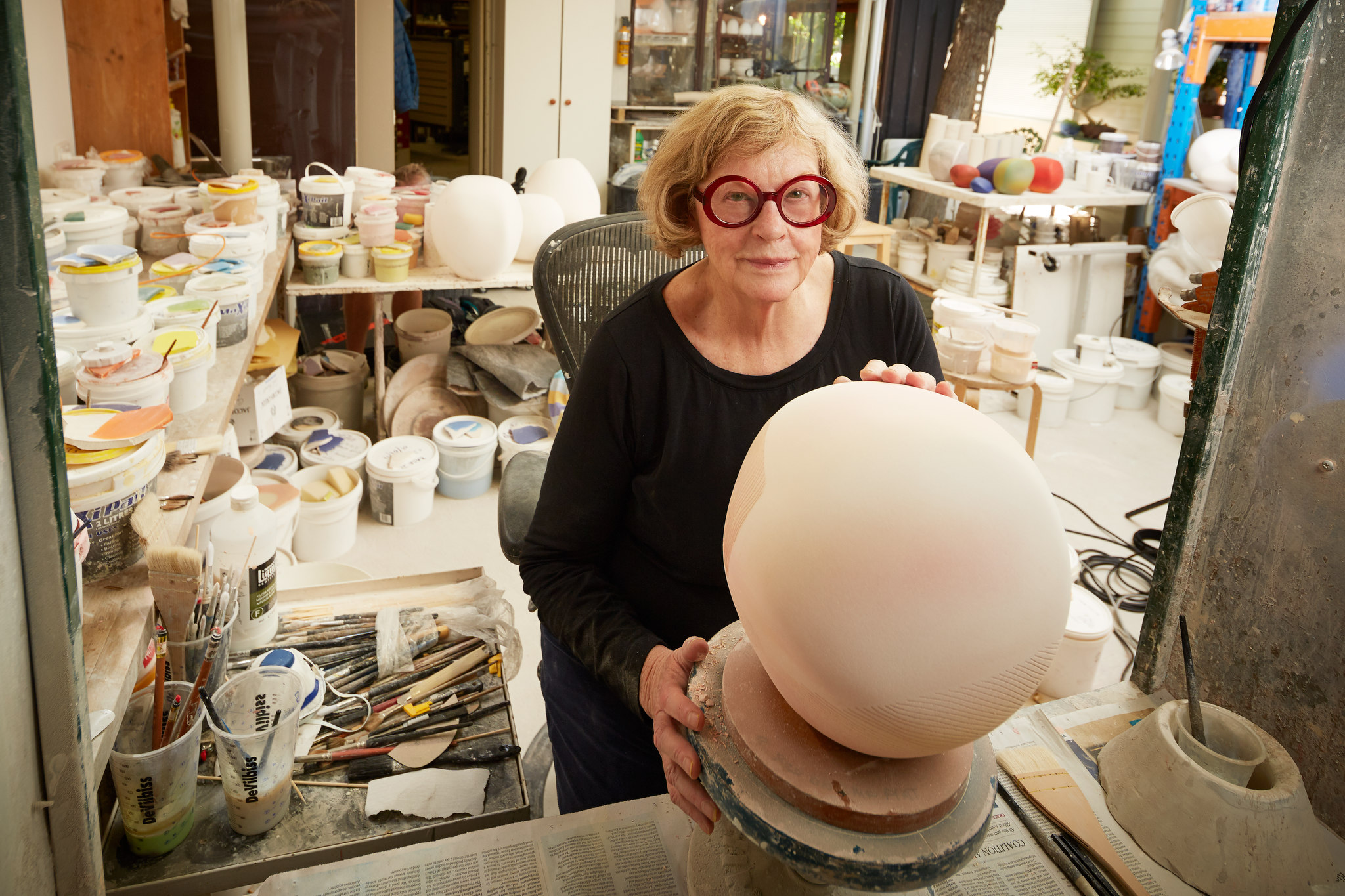
Ceramicist_Pippin_Drysdale

- Faith Clayton, Actress
- Stephanie Coleman
- Robert Drewe
- Pippin Drysdale
- Alan Griffiths
- Joan London Author
- Dr Mary McLean
- Noriko Yoshimoto, Puppeteer
- Chrissie Parrott, Dancer, Choreographer, Director, Teacher
- Herbert Pinter, Production Designer
- Nalda Searles, Visual Artist
- Lew Smith, Musician
- Miriam Stannage Painter, Photographer, Printmaker
- Dr Richard Walley, Musician, Dancer, Painter, Writer, Director, Indigenous Activist, Educator
- Dave Warner Musician

=== Past recipients ===
==== 2004 ====
- Alan Alder,
- Dr Lucette Aldous, Ballerina
- Janangoo Butcher Cherel,
- Jimmy Chi, Composer, Musician, Playwright
- Professor Jeffrey Howlett AM, Architect
- Tom Hungerford AM - journalist, novelist, playwright
- Doris Pilkington Garimara - writer
- Dr Carol Rudyard - visual artist
- Professor Roger Smalley - composer, musician, conductor
- Leonard 'Jack' Williams - Aboriginal custodian, storyteller, craftsman
- Richard Woldendorp - photographer
- Fay Zwicky - poet, fiction writer, editor

==== 1998 ====
- Madame Kira Bousloff,
- Madame Alice Carrard,
- Peter Cowan, Writer
- Jack Davis, Playwright
- Margaret Ford,
- Vaughan Hanly,
- Elizabeth Jolley,
- Robert Juniper,
- Queenie McKenzie,
- Paul Sampi,
- Howard Taylor.

==== Distinguished artists ====
(having passed away prior to the 1998 awards)

- Joan Campbell,
- Rover Thomas.
