= Don Quixote (1973 film) =

1973 Australian ballet film

- Directed by: Rudolf Nureyev; Robert Helpmann
- Written by: Rudolf Nureyev
- Based on: the ballet Don Quixote by Marius Petipa
- Produced by: John L. Hargreaves
- Starring: Robert Helpmann; Rudolf Nureyev
- Cinematography: Geoffrey Unsworth
- Edited by: Anthony Buckley
- Music by: Ludwig Minkus
- Production companies: International Arts; Australian International Finance Corporation; The Australian Ballet Foundation
- Distributed by: The Walter Reade Organisation
- Release date: 19 July 1973
- Running time: 111 minutes
- Country: Australia
- Language: English
- Budget: $750,000

Don Quixote is a 1973 Australian ballet film directed by and starring Rudolf Nureyev and Robert Helpmann. The film is adapted from Marius Petipa's ballet of the same name, itself based on Miguel de Cervantes' novel El ingenioso hidalgo don Quijote de la Mancha.

== Cast ==
- Robert Helpmann as Don Quixote
- Ray Powell as Sancho Panza
- Rudolf Nureyev as Basilio
- Francis Croese as Lorenzo
- Lucette Aldous as Kitri/Dulcinea
- Colin Peasley as Gamache
- Marilyn Rowe as street dancer/queen of the Dryads
- Kelvin Coe as Espada
- Gailene Stock
- Carolyn Rappel
- Ronald Bekker
- John Meehan
- Rex McNeill
- Rodney Smith
- Joseph Janusaitis
- Frederic Werner
- Alan Alder
- Paul Saliba
- Ronald Bekker as gypsy king
- Susan Dains as gypsy queen
- Julie da Costa as gypsy girls
- Leigh Rowley as gypsy girls
- Patricia Cox as Cupid
- Janet Vernon
- Gary Norman

== Production ==
The ballet had been added to the repertoire of the Australian Ballet in a 1970 production designed and costumed by Barry Kay, and was one of Nureyev's most popular parts. Finance to film it was raised mostly in the US with most of the crew coming from Australia but a British cinematographer was used. It was shot over four weeks starting 13 November 1972 in a converted airport hangar in Essendon near Melbourne. They used a music soundtrack arranged and conducted by John Lanchbery, which had been pre-recorded by The Elizabethan Trust Melbourne Orchestra a month earlier at Armstrong Studios.

== Release ==
The film was screened around the world and was well received. However it dropped out of circulation for 25 years and has only recently been revived.
