= Garth Welch =

Australian dancer and choreographer (1936–2025)

Garth Welch AM
- Born: Garth de Burgh Welch; 14 April 1936; Sherwood, Queensland, Australia
- Died: 2 September 2025 (aged 89)
- Occupation: Dancer
- Years active: 1954–1998
- Spouse: Marilyn Jones
- Career
- Former groups: The Australian Ballet

Garth de Burgh Welch AM (14 April 1936 – 2 September 2025) was an Australian dancer and choreographer.

== Early life and training ==
Welch was born in Sherwood, a suburb of Brisbane, Queensland, on 14 April 1936. He was educated at the Anglican Church Grammar School. His first dance teacher, Valma Lock [Hunter], recognized his natural talent and convinced his mother to place him under the guidance of the respected ballet teacher Phyllis Danaher.

== Dancer and choreographer ==
Welch began his career in Call Me Madam for the J. C. Williamson organisation. He came to the attention of Edouard Borovansky and joined the Borovansky Ballet in 1954. Welch achieved within a relatively short time the rank of Principal Dancer with the company. He also danced with Western Theatre Ballet (later Scottish Ballet) and the Grand Ballet du Marquis de Cuevas before returning to Australia at the invitation of Dame Peggy van Praagh as a Principal Dancer with The Australian Ballet in 1962. He remained in the position until he left the company in 1973. While at The Australian Ballet, Welch danced the lead in all the major classical ballets in the company's repertoire and created roles in Sir Robert Helpmann's The Display and Yugen and in John Butler's Threshold. He partnered The Australian Ballet's principal dancers including Marilyn Jones, Kathleen Gorham and Marilyn Rowe, and partnered guest artists including Dame Margot Fonteyn.

In the 1970s he worked with Ballet Victoria both as a choreographer and as associate artistic director. During that time he danced Hilarion and later Albrecht to Natalia Makarova's Giselle in Ballet Victoria's staging of Giselle Act II in 1975. In 1976 he appeared as the Blackamoor in Petrushka for the appearances by Valery Panov and Galina Panov for Ballet Victoria.

Welch was Artistic Director of the West Australian Ballet from 1980 to 1982 and throughout the 1980s and 1990s taught extensively across Australia. In the 1980s Welch also worked with the Sydney Dance Company. In 1984, Graeme Murphy created the role of von Aschenbach in After Venice, and Welch performed this role to singular acclaim in Australia, Europe and New York. With the Sydney Dance Company Welch also performed in Murphy's Late Afternoon of a Faun. In the 1990s Welch returned to musical theatre and appeared in The Game of Love and Chance in 1990, How to Succeed in Business without Really Trying in 1993 and Nijinsky at Twilight in 1998.

Welch choreographed Variations on a Theme for The Australian Ballet in 1964. After that first piece, he created many more works for the flagship company as well as pieces for the West Australian Ballet, Ballet Victoria, Ballet Philippines, the Royal New Zealand Ballet, the Queensland Ballet and the Sydney Dance Company. His major works include Othello, made originally for the Australian Ballet School in 1968, and staged by the Australian Ballet in 1970; and KAL, his first full-length work, made for the West Australian Ballet in 1979.

== Personal life and death ==
Welch married fellow Australian Ballet Principal Dancer Marilyn Jones and they had two sons, also dancers - Stanton Welch and Damien Welch. Stanton Welch, choreographer, is Artistic Director of the Houston Ballet. Damien Welch was a principal dancer with the Australian Ballet.

Welch died on 2 September 2025, at the age of 89.

== Books and articles ==
- Martha Bremser (ed.), International Dictionary of Ballet, Volume 2 (Detroit: St James Press, 1993), p. 1533 (list of works choreographed by Garth Welch)
