= Jodie White =

Jodie White may refer to:

- Jodie-Anne White (1967–2012), Australian dancer, choreographer and artistic director
- Jodie White (footballer) (born 1980), Australian rules footballer
