= Galina Samsova =

Russian ballet dancer (1937–2021)

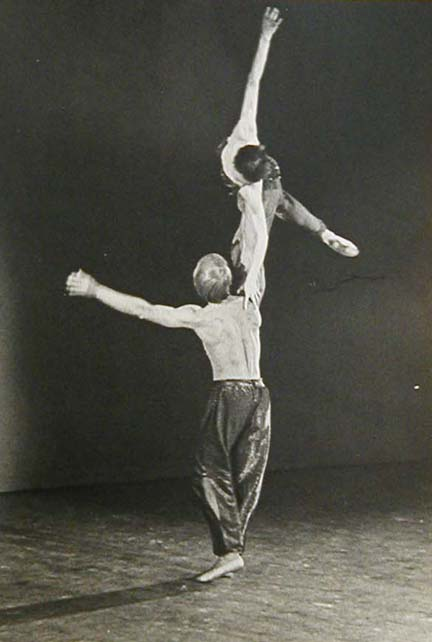
- Galina Samsova and David Adams in Corsaire
- Born: Galina Martinovna Samtsova; 14 March 1937; Stalingrad, Soviet Union (now Volgograd, Russia)
- Died: 11 December 2021 (aged 84); London, England
- Occupation: Ballet dancer
- Spouses: Alexander Ursuliak (m. 1960, divorced) André Prokovsky (m. 1972; div. 1981)

Galina Samsova (born Galina Martynovna Samtsova, 14 March 1937 – 11 December 2021) was a Russian ballet dancer and company director.

== Early life and training ==
Samsova was born as Galina Martynovna Samtsova (she later simplified the spelling of her surname) in Stalingrad (now Volgograd) in southwestern Russia on 14 March 1937. began ballet training at an early age. She studied at the Kiev Opera Ballet School with Natalia Verekundova and in 1956 graduated into the Kiev Opera Ballet, where she eventually became a soloist. In 1960 she married the Canadian-Ukrainian dance teacher Alexander Ursuliak and moved with him to Canada. The following year, 1961, she joined the National Ballet of Canada in Toronto, having simplified the spelling of her maiden name from Samtsova to Samsova. Hired as a soloist, she was soon promoted to principal dancer and was cast in leading roles in Swan Lake and Giselle as well as in works by Balanchine, Tudor, and Cranko.

== Performing career ==
In 1963, Samsova was visiting London when she was recommended to Raymundo de Larraín, nephew of the marquis de Cuevas, for the title role in his lavish new production of Prokofiev's Cinderella, to be choreographed by Vaslav Orlikovsky and presented at the International Dance Festival in Paris. Making her western European debut in the role, which she danced almost every day for a month, Samsova won the festival's gold medal for a performance by a female dancer (Rudolf Nureyev won the gold medal for a male dancer). Her lyrical interpretation of Cinderella also resulted in invitations to give guest performances in many companies, including the Marseille Opera Ballet and London Festival Ballet.

Samsova joined London Festival Ballet as a guest artist in 1964 but soon became a permanent member of the company, serving as its principal ballerina for nearly a decade, until 1973. While there, she formed a partnership with David Adams, performing in virtuosic showcases such as Spring Waters and the Medora-Ali pas de deux from Le Corsaire, evening-length classics such as Swan Lake and The Sleeping Beauty, and many other works. The pair won the gold medal at Il Festival de la Opera, Madrid, for their performance of Giselle. In 1966 Samsova went to Johannesburg, South Africa, to dance as guest star in yet another production of Cinderella, staged by French choreographer Françoise Adret for PACT/TRUK Ballet. The role of Prince Charming in this production was taken by André Prokovsky, a Franco-Russian dancer whom Samsova had met in Marseille and who would soon begin to play a large part in her life. Not only her partner on stage, he would become her second husband, after her first marriage failed.

During her later years with London Festival Ballet, Samsova formed an acclaimed partnership with Prokovsky. They danced together in numerous works in the company repertory, creating leading roles in The Unknown Island (1969) by Jack Carter, in Othello and La Péri (both 1971) by Peter Darrell, and in Dvořák Variations (1970) and Mozartiana (1973) by Ronald Hynd. Samsova and Prokovsky married in 1972 and left London Festival Ballet in 1973 to direct and perform in their own troupe. This soon grew into the New London Ballet, a classical company of fourteen dancers that toured extensively in Britain and overseas with a repertory consisting mostly of newly created works. After the company disbanded in 1977, owing to unmeetable demands of the musicians' union in London, Samsova followed Prokovsky to Italy, where he had accepted the directorship of the Rome Opera Ballet for two years. Besides dancing with that company, Samsova made guest appearances with companies in France, Germany, Hong Kong, Canada, the United States, South Africa, and England.

In 1978 she danced as a guest with Sadler's Wells Royal Ballet (now called Birmingham Royal Ballet) before joining the company as a principal and teacher two years later, in 1980. During her ten years with this troupe she staged the grand pas from act 2 of Paquita (1980) and mounted, in collaboration with Peter Wright, a production of Swan Lake (1981).

== Later life ==
After retiring from the stage, Samsova became the artistic director of the Scottish Ballet in Glasgow in 1991, succeeding its founder, Peter Darrell, who had died in 1987. Samsova increased the emphasis on the classics in the repertory, mounting her own version of act 3 of Raymonda (1990), and introduced neoclassic works by Balanchine, Robert Cohan, and Mark Baldwin, among others. She resigned her post in 1997. She made her home once again in London, where she was a mentor to rising young dancers. She also continued her career as a juror at international ballet competitions in Paris, Moscow, Kiev, Shanghai, and Jackson, Mississippi.

Samsova died in London on 11 December 2021, at the age of 84.

== See also ==
- List of Russian ballet dancers
