= Kirsty Martin =

Australian ballet dancer (born 1976)

Kirsty Martin (born 1976) is an Australian ballet dancer. She was a star and principal of The Australian Ballet (AB), dancing for the company from 1995 until she retired in 2011. Martin was the company's first member to win the Prix Benois de la Danse.

== Biography ==
A solicitor's daughter from Leeton, New South Wales, Martin has two brothers. She took her first ballet lesson at the age of four at the Di Salvatore Dance Academy. Martin trained at the Australian Ballet School under Gailene Stock, graduating in 1996. On a travel scholarship, she continued her studies with Gelsey Kirkland in New York where in 1997 she also worked with Twyla Tharp on The Storyteller. She danced La Bayadère in 1998. After a few years with the AB, in 2000 she and her husband Damien Welch joined the Nederlands Dans Theater in The Hague where she danced in contemporary works choreographed by Jiří Kylián, Johan Inger and Paul Lightfoot. The couple returned to Australia in 2002.

Back with the AB, she performed in Graeme Murphy's Swan Lake and in the 2003 revival of André Prokovsky's The Three Musketeers, earning a promotion to principal dancer. In 2006, Stephen Baynes created the title role for her in his new production of Raymonda, and in the same year, she danced Giselle. Her 2007 repertoire included Don Quixote, Apollo, After the Rain, Paquita, Symphonie Fantastique, Les Présages. The following year, she performed Manon, danced previously in 1999.

Awarded the Prix Benois de la Danse in 2009, she was the first Australian, and first member of the AB to win the prize. Her other awards include the gold medal, Fifth Asia Pacific Ballet Competition (1995) and the silver medal, Adeline Genée Competition (1995). Noted for her "extraordinary artistry and stage presence", Martin retired from the stage in July 2011 after dancing in the final performance of The Merry Widow at Melbourne. Her husband had retired two years earlier; they have two children, Oscar and Matilda. The dancer and choreographer Stanton Welch is Martin's brother-in-law.
