= Fool on the Hill =

Fool on the Hill may refer to:

- "The Fool on the Hill", a 1967 song by the Beatles
- Fool on the Hill (album), a 1968 album by Sergio Mendes and Brasil '66
- The Fool on the Hill (ballet), a 1976 ballet by Gillian Lynne
- Fool on the Hill (novel), a 1988 novel by Matt Ruff
