= John Meehan (dancer) =

Australian ballet dancer and choreographer

John Meehan (born 1950) is an Australian ballet director, choreographer, professor, and retired ballet dancer.

== Biography ==
He was educated at the Anglican Church Grammar School in Brisbane and studied at the Australian Ballet School. Meehan joined the Australian Ballet in 1970 and was promoted to principal dancer in 1974, creating roles in new works by Glen Tetley, John Butler, Garth Welch, Sir Robert Helpmann and Gillian Lynne as well as the role of Count Danilo in Ronald Hynd's The Merry Widow. In 1977, he performed as Guest Artist with American Ballet Theatre (ABT) joining the company as Principal Dancer in the fall of that year. He also danced as guest artist with the Boston Ballet, the National Ballet of Canada and the New York City Ballet.

While in Australia, Meehan's teachers included Patricia MacDonald, Martin Rubinstein, Vera Volkova, Dame Margaret Scott and Dame Peggy Van Praagh and in New York, Maggie Black, David Howard and Stanley Williams. He worked closely with the choreographers Anthony Tudor and Glen Tetley as well as Sir Frederick Ashton and Sir Robert Helpmann.

During his dancing career, he partnered many of the world's leading ballerinas including, Dame Margot Fonteyn, Merrill Ashley, Gelsey Kirkland, Cynthia Gregory, Martine Van Hamel, Natalia Makarova, Eva Evdokimova, Karen Kain and the Australian ballet stars Marilyn Rowe and Marilyn Jones. He can also been seen partnering Karen Kain in the National Ballet of Canada's production of Hynd's The Merry Widow.

On television, John performed on the Merv Griffin Show, the 1978 Academy Awards Presentation and in the episode Come Dance with Me on the Love Boat. In 1983, Meehan was cast in the lead role of Andrew Lloyd Webber's Song and Dance which he performed in London opposite Liz Robertson, in Australia opposite Gaye MacFarlane and on Broadway opposite Bernadette Peters and later Betty Buckley. He also was seen in the US tour of the same show opposite Melissa Manchester.

Meehan retired from the stage in 1989, and in 1990, was appointed as the Artistic Director of the Royal Winnipeg Ballet. In 1997, he became Artistic Director of the American Ballet Theatre Studio Company, training among others, MIsty Copeland, Isabella Boylston, Hee Seo, Michelle Wiles, Ashley Ellis, Yuriko Kajiha, Allison Miller, Erica Cornejo, Herman Cornejo, David Hallberg, Matthew Golding, Tom Forster, Cory Stearns, Roman Zhurbin and Craig Salstein. He was the artistic director of Hong Kong Ballet between July 2006 to 2009 before joining the faculty of Vassar College as Professor of Dance on the Frances Daly Fergusson Chair in the Humanities.

Meehan's choreography is in the repertoire of the Australian Ballet, American Ballet Theatre (ABT), The Washington Ballet, the Metropolitan Opera, the Hong Kong Ballet and the Royal Winnipeg Ballet.

Meehan has served as a juror of the Prix de Lausanne, twice as the president of the jury (2004 and 2006) and is currently President of the USA International Ballet Competition. He was juror at the Moscow International Ballet Competition in 2017, and regularly invited as a judge for the Youth America Grand Prix.
