= Peter Land =

New Zealand actor

Peter Land MNZM
- Born: Peter Oliver White; 9 July 1953 (age 73); Taihape, New Zealand
- Spouse: Gillian Lynne (m. 1980; died 2018)

Peter Land MNZM (born Peter Oliver White; 9 July 1953) is a New Zealand actor and singer known for his classical acting with the Royal National Theatre and the Royal Shakespeare Company as well as appearances in many musicals.

== Biography ==
=== Early life ===
Born Peter Oliver White in Taihape, he is the third child of Dr Allan Neil White, appointed Member of the New Zealand Order of Merit for services to medicine and the community in the New Zealand 2007 New Year Honours, and Molly Louise Copeland, whose maiden name provided Land with his last name. Land was educated at Palmerston North Boys' High School, Victoria University of Wellington (graduating from the Drama Department) and Toi Whakaari: New Zealand Drama School, from where he graduated with a Diploma in Acting in 1975. Land achieved notable stage success after moving to England in October 1977.

=== Career ===
His West End musical debut was as Freddy in My Fair Lady in 1979–1980 at the Adelphi Theatre. This was followed by seasons at the Royal National Theatre in Life of Galileo with Sir Michael Gambon and the Royal Shakespeare Company in The Winter's Tale with Patrick Stewart, Proteus in The Two Gentlemen of Verona (1982) and All's Well That Ends Well with Dame Peggy Ashcroft (1982).

Equally at home in musicals with roles such as Cliff in Cabaret, Andre in The Phantom of the Opera, Snodgrass in Pickwick, Savory in One Touch of Venus and in 2007 as Captain Hook "brilliantly played with a flamboyant, nervous energy and drolly self-guying swagger" in a new adaptation of J. M. Barrie's Peter Pan. In this production, he sang the first stage performance of "Captain Hook's Soliloquy", composed by Leonard Bernstein in 1950 and given its world premiere in concert by baritone Lawrence Tibbett.

He first appeared on British television in the Secret Army series as Erich Devouglaar, a Flemish youth destined for the Eastern Front, while for CBS in 1985, he appeared as Mr. Brent, a 'dream broker', in a season 1 episode of The Twilight Zone, called Wish Bank.

In June 2008 Land appeared as René Auberjonois's brother Beralde in Molière's The Imaginary Invalid, at the Shakespeare Theatre Company in Washington D.C. directed by Keith Baxter.

In 2010/11 Land was back at The King's Head Theatre (renamed London's Little Opera House) debuting as The Bonze in OperaUpClose's radical reinterpretation of Puccini's Madam Butterfly directed by Adam Spreadbury-Maher.

He appeared in Now or Never, his one-man cabaret show directed by Gillian Lynne, dedicated to the victims of the 2011 Canterbury earthquake in New Zealand in London at the King's Head Theatre in 2011. An updated version ran at New York's Off-Broadway York Theatre in February 2012.

In 2013 Land played a "leanly rapacious capitalist" in Jerry Herman's Dear World in the West End at the Charing Cross Theatre. The musical starring Betty Buckley was directed and choreographed by Gillian Lynne.

He appeared in the Off-Broadway production of Ruthless! as Sylvia St. Croix in 2015.

=== Personal life ===
Land married director and choreographer Gillian Lynne in 1980.
