= Ballet Theatre of Queensland =

Ballet Theatre of Queensland, founded in 1937 by Phyllis Danaher MBE FRAD, is the oldest continuous dance company in Australia. Ballet Theatre is based in Brisbane in the Australian state of Queensland.

== History ==
Predating both the Australian Ballet and the Queensland Ballet, Ballet Theatre of Queensland was established by Phyllis Danaher to bring dance on a regular basis to people in Queensland. Prior to its inception, ballet had only been presented by touring companies such as that of the famous Russian ballerina, Anna Pavlova on an irregular basis. Danaher was determined to change this state of affairs and to provide opportunities for talented Queenslanders to shine in this area of the performing arts. Today the company founded by Danaher continues to present full-scale productions every year at the Playhouse, Queensland Performing Arts Centre, South Bank, Queensland.

Artistic directors have included Jodie-Anne White and Boris Bivona. Following White's death in 2012 they were succeeded by Timothy Brown and Libby McDonnell, with Tim Brown as sole artistic director from 2013 to 2019.

== Funding, organisational and artistic structures ==
Ballet Theatre of Queensland is a non-profit incorporated organisation, governed by a board of non-executive directors under the Chairmanship of Craig Spencer. In 2013 the corporate structure of the company was changed to incorporate the governing board and an executive director (Denise Richardson) was appointed to manage the company in conjunction with the artistic director, Timothy Brown. The organisation receives no recurrent or operational funding from the Australian or Queensland Governments. Ballet Theatre of Queensland relies purely on box office from its annual production, corporate sponsors and costume and set hire fees.

Each annual production highlights the talents of dancers from dance schools across south-east Queensland. All dancers are required to take part in an audition process and are usually aged between ten and eighteen. Invited artists sometimes perform as guests with the company. Dancers of Ballet Theatre of Queensland all undertake individual studies and ballet examinations, such as Royal Academy of Dance, with their own dance schools.

== Productions and equipment ==
In 2008, Ballet Theatre of Queensland presented performances of The Sleeping Princess in Brisbane and on tour in Toowoomba. Previous years have seen productions of Coppélia, The Nutcracker, Peter Pan, Pinocchio, Aladdin, Paquita and many others. As a result, a vast quantity of sets and costumes have been created which are available for hire by other performing arts groups.
