= Françoise Adret =

French ballet dancer, teacher, choreographer, and company director

- Born: August 7, 1920; Versailles, France
- Died: April 1, 2018 (aged 97)
- Occupations: Ballet dancer, choreographer, teacher, company director
- Years active: 1940s–1999
- Notable work: La Conjuration, Aquathèmes, Requiem
- Awards: Commandeur, Ordre des Arts et des Lettres (1983), Grand Prix National de la Danse (1987), Chevalier, Légion d'Honneur (1994)
- Career
- Former groups: Paris Opera Ballet, Ballets de Paris, Ballet of the Netherlands Opera, Ballet Théâtre Contemporain, Ballet du Nord, Ballet de Lorraine

Françoise Adret (7 August 1920 – 1 April 2018) was a French ballet dancer, teacher, choreographer, and company director.

Her professional career, international in scope, albeit centered in France, spanned more than sixty years. She was recognized as one of the most innovative creators of contemporary dance in western Europe.

== Biography and career ==
Born in Versailles, Adret began her dance training at an early age. In the 1930s she studied with the leading Franco-Russian teachers in Paris, including Victor Gsovsky, Madame Rousanne (Rousanne Sarkissian) and Serge Lifar. In the late 1940s, following World War II, she had a modest career with the Paris Opera Ballet, making a notable appearance at the Théâtre des Champs-Élysées in 1948 in a principal role in Lifar's production of Le Pas d'Acier ("The Steel Step"), a modern ballet about Soviet factory workers set to a score in le style mécanique by Prokofiev.

From Lifar, director of the Paris Opera Ballet from 1930 to 1944, and from 1947 to 1958, she learned much about company administration and direction. Under his guidance, she made her first choreography, entitled La Conjuration ("The Conspiracy"), in 1948. Based on a poem by René Char, it was set to music by Jacques Porte and had décor by Georges Braque.

Later that year, Adret left the Paris Opera Ballet and became ballet mistress of Roland Petit's Ballets de Paris, touring with the company in western Europe. In 1951 she succeeded Darja Collin as director of the Ballet of the Netherlands Opera in Amsterdam while continuing to work with Petit's company, raising the technical level of the dancers in both companies. Working in Amsterdam until 1958, she also expanded the repertory of the Dutch company with classical ballets and a number of original choreographic works.

In 1960, she became ballet mistress of the Ballet de l'Opéra de Nice and remained with that company until 1963, staging opera divertissements and modern ballets. She then spent a few years as an international guest choreographer, staging works for Le Grand Ballet du Marquis de Cuevas in Paris, PACT/TRUK Ballet in Johannesburg, the Warsaw Opera Ballet, the Zagreb Opera Ballet, and the Harkness Ballet in New York City. While residing in Panama, she created the Ballet Nacional de Panamá.

Returning to France, Adret joined Jean-Albert Cartier in 1968 in the creation of the Ballet Théâtre Contemporain, the first national choreographic center, established in Amiens. She was choreographic director of the repertory, and for it she created some of her most notable works, including Aquathémes and Requiem. In 1972, the company moved from Amiens to Angers and embarked on its first tour of North America.

Adret remained with Ballet Théâtre Contemporain for ten years, until 1978, when it was subsumed by the activities of the newly established Centre National de Danse Contemporaine. She was then appointed inspector general for dance projects in the Ministry of Culture, a post she retained until 1985, when she was invited by Louis Erlo, director of the Lyon Opera, to create a new ballet company committed to contemporary choreographers. During her seven years there, until 1992, Adret put the company in the forefront of contemporary dance in France.

Adret next became artistic director and chief choreographer of the Ballet du Nord in Roubaix, where in 1994 she mounted two new versions of Symphonie de Psaumes and Le Tricorne. From 1995 to 1998 the Association Française d'Action Artistique sent her on three overseas missions, during which she taught dance classes and choreographed works in Seoul, South Korea, in Montevideo, Uruguay, and in Asunción, Paraguay. She then returned to France, working again with Roland Petit, serving as ballet mistress of his Ballet National de Marseille in 1997 and 1998.

On 1 July 1999 she accepted a temporary appointment as artistic director of the Ballet de Lorraine, replacing Pierre Lacotte, who had returned to the Paris Opera Ballet. Nearing her eightieth birthday, she served in that post for an interim period of one year.

== Awards and honors ==
For her work as inspector general of dance projects in the Ministry of Culture, Adret was made a commandeur in the Ordre des Arts et des Lettres in 1983. In recognition of her role in developing contemporary dance in France, she received the Grand Prix National de la Danse in 1987, and in 1994 she was named as a chevalier in the Ordre National de la Légion d'Honneur.

== Legacy ==
A small, energetic woman with a sparkling wit, Adret was generally acknowledged as a figure incontournable ("indispensable person") in twentieth-century French dance. She was praised for her work as a pedagogue and greatly admired for her unique artistic vision, which allowed her to reconcile her dance works on the cutting edge of modernity with the classic ballet repertory of yesteryear.

== Selected works ==
- Apollon Musagéte (1951); music, Igor Stravinsky; décor, Guillot de Rode
- Orphée (1951?); music, Claudio Monteverdi; décor, Gustave Singer
- Quatre Mouvements (1952)
- Claire (1953?); music, Alphonse Diepenbrock; décor, Dimitri Bouchene
- Le Sanctuaire (1956)
- Othello (1958); music Jean-Michel Demase; décor, Georges Wakhevitch
- Barbaresques (1960)
- Mayerling (1961?); music, Maurice Thiriét; décor, Wladimir Jedrinsky
- Resurrection (1961?); music, Alexandre Tansman
- Le Tricorne (1962); music, Manuel de Falla; décor, Andrej Majevski
- Le Manteau Rouge(1963); music, Luigi Nono; décor, Andrej Majevski
- Le Mandarin Merveilleux (1965); music, Béla Bartók
- Cinderella (1966); music, Sergei Prokofiev; décor, Raimond Schoop
- Incendio (1967)
- Acquathéme (1968); music, Ivo Malec; décor, Gustave Singier
- Eonta (1969); music, Iannis Xenakis; décor, Mario Prassinos
- Requiem (1971); music, György Ligeti; décor, Francisco Sobrino
- La Follia d'Orlando (1972); music, Gofredo Petrassi
- Le Rossignol (1972); music, Igor Stravinsky
- Symphonie de Psaumes (1994); music, Igor Stravinsky
