= Elisha Willis =

Elisha Willis is a retired ballet dancer and former principal at the Birmingham Royal Ballet. Willis was born in Australia and trained at the Australian Ballet School. She joined the Australian Ballet in 1999 and later in 2003 joined the Birmingham Royal Ballet, where she covered extensive roles. She is well known for the title role in David Bintley's Cinderella which was also released as DVD. In 2016 she terminated her 13 year career at the Birmingham Royal Ballet in order to pursue her next career in ballet costume making.
