= Melissa Hayden (dancer) =

Canadian ballerina (1923–2006)

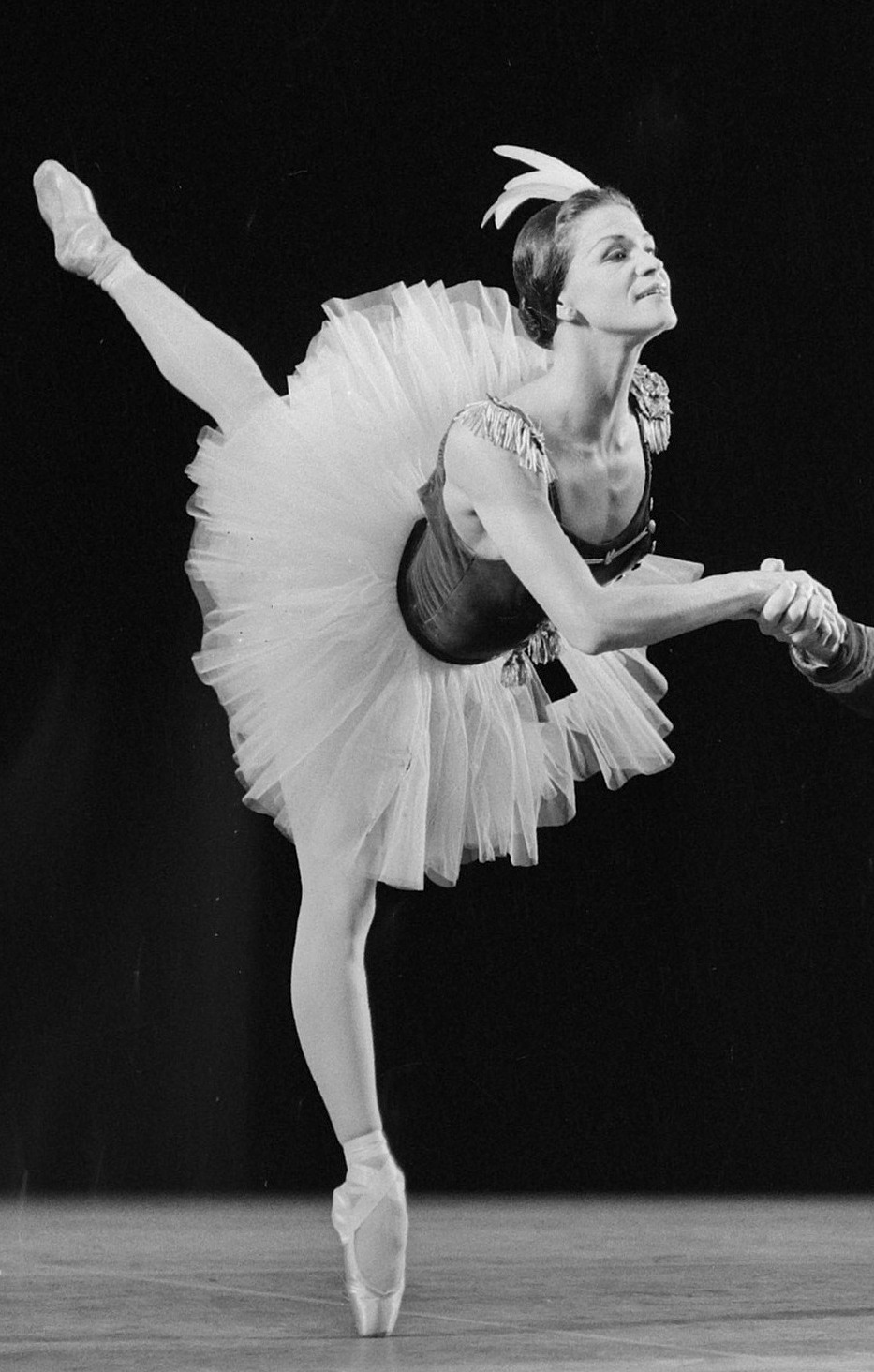
- Hayden in 1965
- Born: Mildred Hermen; April 25, 1923; Toronto, Ontario, Canada
- Died: August 9, 2006 (aged 83); Winston-Salem, North Carolina, U.S.
- Occupation: Ballerina
- Spouse: Don Coleman
- Children: 2

Melissa Hayden (born Mildred Herman; April 25, 1923 – August 9, 2006) was a Canadian ballerina at the New York City Ballet.

== Early life ==
Hayden was born in Toronto as the second daughter of Jacob Herman and his wife Kate Weinberg, Jewish immigrants from Russia. The young Mildred was called Millie at home, a nickname she kept for the rest of her life.

== Career ==
In the early 1940s, she moved to New York City to join the ballet corps at Radio City Music Hall. From 1945 to 1947, she was a member of the American Ballet Theatre; she joined the New York City Ballet shortly after its founding in 1948, becoming a principal dancer in 1955 and remaining there until her retirement in 1973. Jacques d'Amboise was a frequent partner.

== Film and television ==
Hayden appeared frequently on television, especially The Kate Smith Show and The Ed Sullivan Show. In 1952 she performed as the dance double for Claire Bloom in the film Limelight.

In 1965, she was seen on American television as the Sugar Plum Fairy in a one-hour German-American adaptation of The Nutcracker. Filmed in 1964 and first shown in the United States by CBS just four days before Christmas 1965, the production, with a heavily altered storyline, featured an international cast of dancers and English narration by Eddie Albert. Edward Villella and Patricia McBride also starred.

== Retirement ==
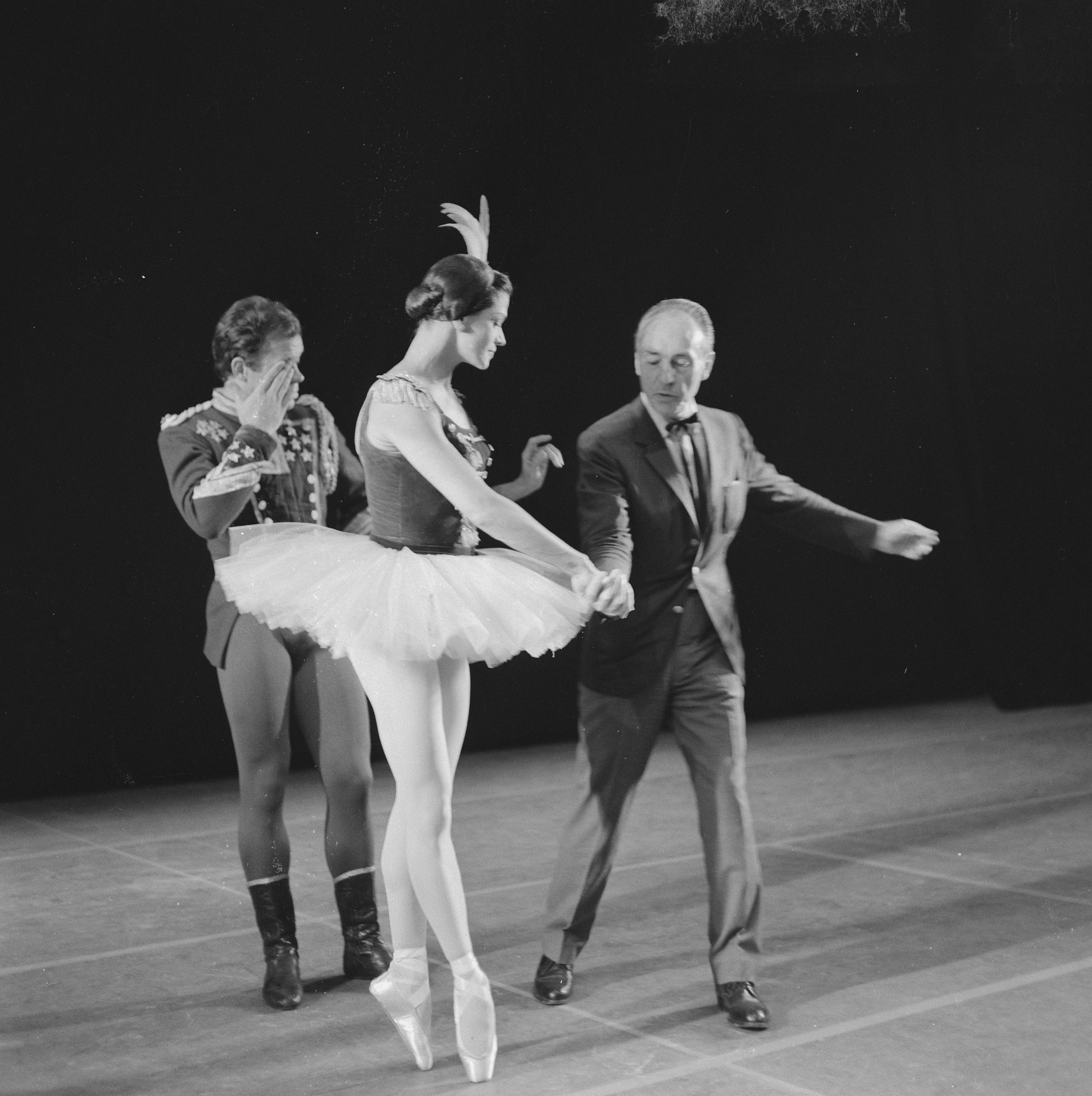
With George Balanchine and André Prokovsky (Amsterdam, 1965)

After appearing in over 60 ballets, mainly works by George Balanchine, Hayden retired as a dancer in 1973. Balanchine honored her on her retirement by creating the ballet "Cortege Hongrois". At the premiere of the piece, Mayor John Lindsay presented Hayden with the city's Handel Medallion, praising her as an "extraordinary ballerina who has filled the hearts of her audience with joy".

After her retirement, she became head of the ballet department at Skidmore College, and taught ballet at the School of Pacific Northwest Ballet in Seattle, and in New York City, where she opened her own school. From 1983 until just a month before her death, she taught at the North Carolina School of the Arts in Winston-Salem, where she stressed the importance of the Balanchine technique. She rehearsed and staged some of Balanchine's most demanding works including Concerto Barocco, and the masterful Theme & Variations.

== Marriage and children ==
Hayden married lawyer-businessman Donald Coleman. The couple had two children. Hayden died at her home in Winston-Salem of pancreatic cancer, aged 83.

== Published works ==
Hayden was also an author of several books:

- Melissa Hayden, Offstage and On (1963)
- Ballet Exercises for Figure, Grace & Beauty (1969)
- Dancer to Dancer: Advice for Today's Dancer (1981) ISBN 0-385-15582-4
- The Nutcracker Ballet, illustrated by Stephen Johnson (1992) ISBN 0-8362-4501-6

== Bibliography ==
- Gustaitis, Rasa: Melissa Hayden Ballerina. Nelson. 1967.
