= Madeleine Eastoe =

Australian ballet dancer

- Born: 1978 or 1979 (age 47–48); Perth, Australia
- Education: Australian Ballet School
- Occupation: ballet dancer
- Years active: 1997–2015
- Spouse: Tim Harbour
- Children: 1
- Dancing career
- Former groups: The Australian Ballet

Madeleine Eastoe is an Australian retired ballet dancer. She was a principal dancer at The Australian Ballet.

== Biography ==
Eastoe started ballet at age six, in Perth, Australia. In 1994, Eastoe moved to Melbourne to study at the Australian Ballet School. She joined The Australian Ballet in 1997. She had some opportunities early on, including filling in for a soloist to dance Tschaikovsky Pas de Deux with David McAllister.

Eastoe was promoted to principal dancer in 2004, after debut as the title role in Giselle. She had since danced lead roles in other productions, such as the title role in Cinderella, Lise in La Fille mal gardée and Odette in Graeme Murphy's Swan Lake. She danced the latter on tour in UK, Japan and Paris, including the opening night in London. She originated the role of Juliet in Murphy's Romeo and Juliet.

In 2009, Eastoe appeared in the 2009 Li Cunxin biopic Mao's Last Dancer. She played Houston Ballet's Lori Langlinais, and danced with Chi Cao, who portrayed Li.

In 2015, Eastoe retired from the Australian Ballet. She reprised the role that led to her promotion, Giselle, in Adelaide for her farewell performance. After retirement, she taught adult ballet class at the Australian Ballet and pre-professional classes at the Melbourne School of Classical Dance.

== Selected repertoire ==
Eastoe's repertoire with The Australian Ballet includes:

- Manon in Manon
- Cinderella in Cinderella
- Odette/Odile in Swan Lake
- Clara in The Nutcracker
- Kitri in Don Quixote
- Giselle in Giselle
- La Sylphide
- Odette in Graeme Murphy's Swan Lake
- Lise in La Fille mal gardée
- Juliet in Romeo and Juliet
- Clara in Graeme Murphy's Nutcracker – The Story of Clara

=== Created roles ===
- Graeme Murphy's Romeo and Juliet
- Stephen Baynes's Constant Variants

== Awards ==
- Telstra People's Choice Award, 2006
- Green Room Award, 2005
- Helpmann Award nomination, 2003

== Personal life ==
Eastoe is married to choreographer Tim Harbour. They have a daughter. She worked at the Australian Ballet's wardrobe department during her pregnancy.
