= Phyllis Danaher =

Australian ballet dancer

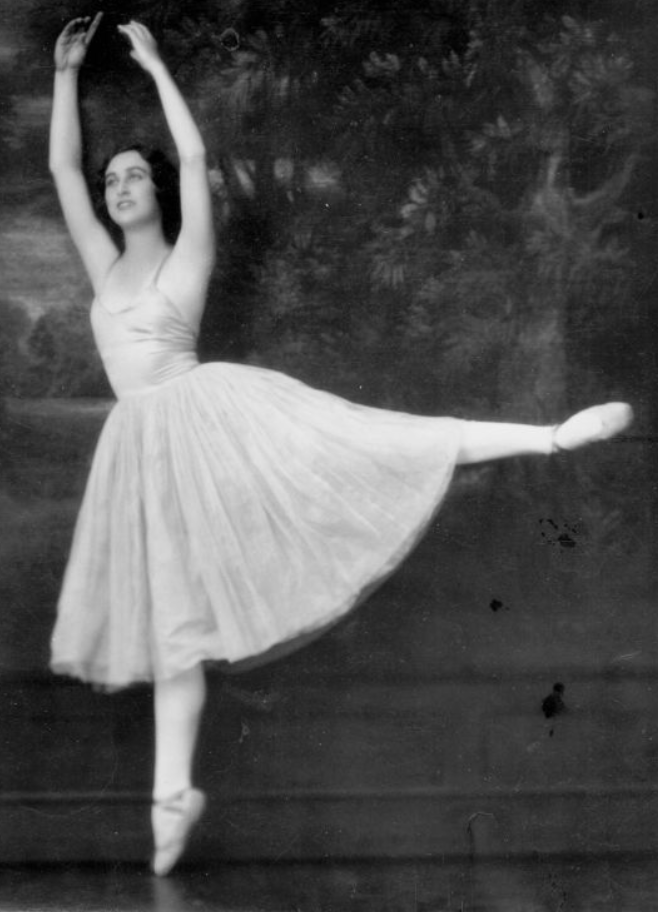
- Born: 27 July 1908; Bulimba, Queensland
- Died: 31 May 1991 (aged 82); Clayfield, Queensland
- Education: Royal Academy of Dance
- Occupations: Dancer, dance teacher, choreographer, stage director
- Career
- Former groups: Ballet Theatre of Queensland

Phyllis May Danaher MBE FRAD (27 July 1908 – 31 May 1991) was an Australian dancer, teacher of dance and choreographer.

== Early life and education ==
Danaher was born on 27 July 1908 in Bulimba, a suburb of Brisbane, Queensland, to William Patrick Danaher and Ivy May (née Bagnall). She began dancing in the early 1920s with Margaret St Ledger and then, after 1927, with Marjorie Hollinshed who took over St Ledger's school. She also went to Sydney to study at the Frances Scully School of Dance.

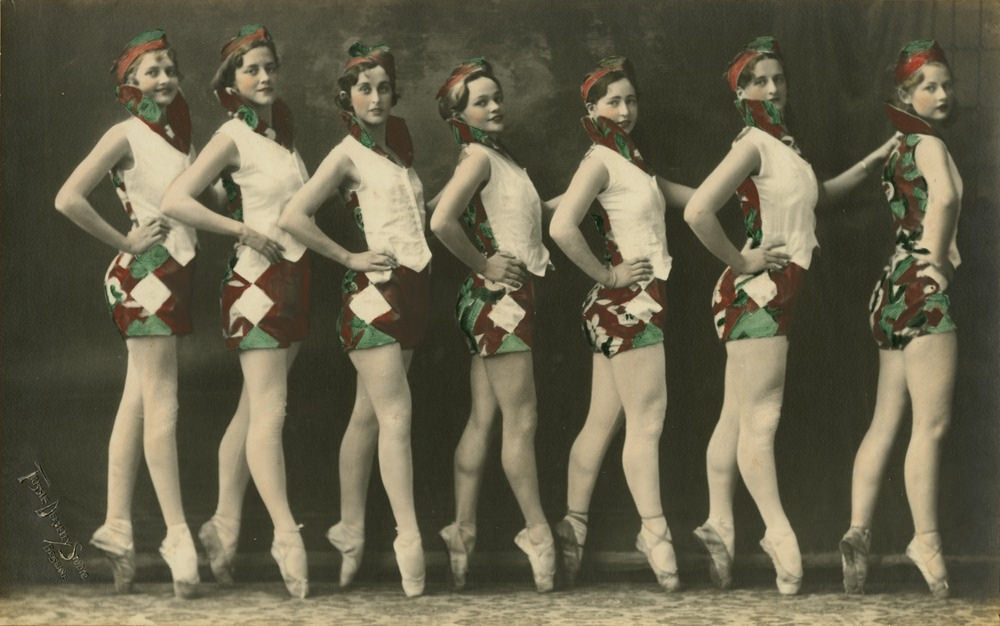
Phyllis Danaher in 1931 at the Marjorie Hollinshed School of Dance (third from left)

== Career ==
Danaher appeared as an extra in Anna Pavlova's company in Brisbane during its 1929 Australian Tour and in the 1930s, she performed in J. C. Williamson's musicals.

In 193, she became a co-owner of Hollinshed's school, where she had previously trained and became the school's principal after Hollinshed retired. She was the first Queensland teacher to gain the Advanced Teachers Certificate from the Royal Academy of Dance in 1937. That year, Danaher founded the Queensland branch of the Australasian Society for Operatic Dancing and the Brisbane Ballet Theatre, later renamed the Ballet Theatre of Queensland. She choreographed their first original work, The Wasps, which debuted at Brisbane City Hall in 1956. She served as the company's director until 1984.

From 1957 to 1982, Danaher was a Children's Examiner for the Royal Academy of Dance. Her contributions were recognised by her designation as Fellow of the Royal Academy of Dance and the award of Member of the Order of the British Empire for service to dance in Queensland. Two of Danaher's more successful students were Principal Dancers with the Australian Ballet, Garth Welch and Lucette Aldous.

== Death and legacy ==
Danaher died in Clayfield, Brisbane on 31 May 1991. She was buried in Brisbane's Lutwyche Cemetery.

Every year, the Phyllis Danaher Memorial Scholarship is awarded to a dancer who has been with the Ballet Theatre of Queensland for at least one year.
