= Beverly Jane Fry =

Australian ballerina

Beverly Jane Fry is an Australian ballerina.

Fry was born in Bexley, Kent, England but at an early age moved with her family to Melbourne, Australia. She trained with the Australian prima ballerina, Kathleen Gorham, and with Gailene Stock.

From 1998 until 2017 she was the artistic director at the National Theatre Ballet School.
