= Marjorie Hollinshed =

Australian ballet dancer and teacher (1905–1995)

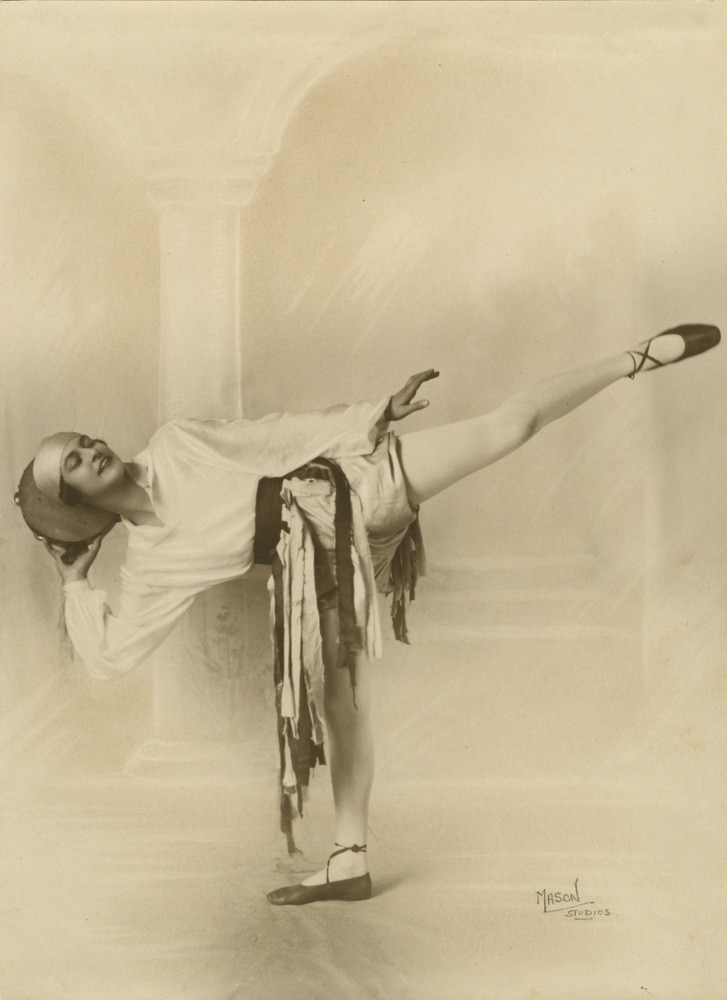
- Hollinshed c. 1930
- Born: 1905; Brisbane, Australia
- Died: 1995 (aged 89–90); Wooloowin, Queensland
- Occupation: Ballet teacher
- Spouse: Keith Lucas

Marjorie Hollinshed (1905–1995) was a ballet dancer and dance teacher from Queensland, Australia. She was instrumental in the development of ballet in Queensland.

Born in Brisbane, she spent her teen years in Melbourne where she received some ballet training. Upon her return to Brisbane, she became an assistant to Margaret St. Ledger at her dance school. After St. Ledger's retirement, she took over the school. At the time, most dance schools in Australia taught mixture of dances, including ballroom and theatrical. Anna Pavlova's Australian tours in 1926 and 1929 inspired teachers like Hollinshed to learn and train in classical ballet (then called operatic dancing). In 1932, she retired from teaching to marry veterinary surgeon Keith Lucas and passed her studio on to her pupil Phyllis Danaher. Other notable students of hers include Laurel Martyn. She went on to publish two books about ballet in Australia.

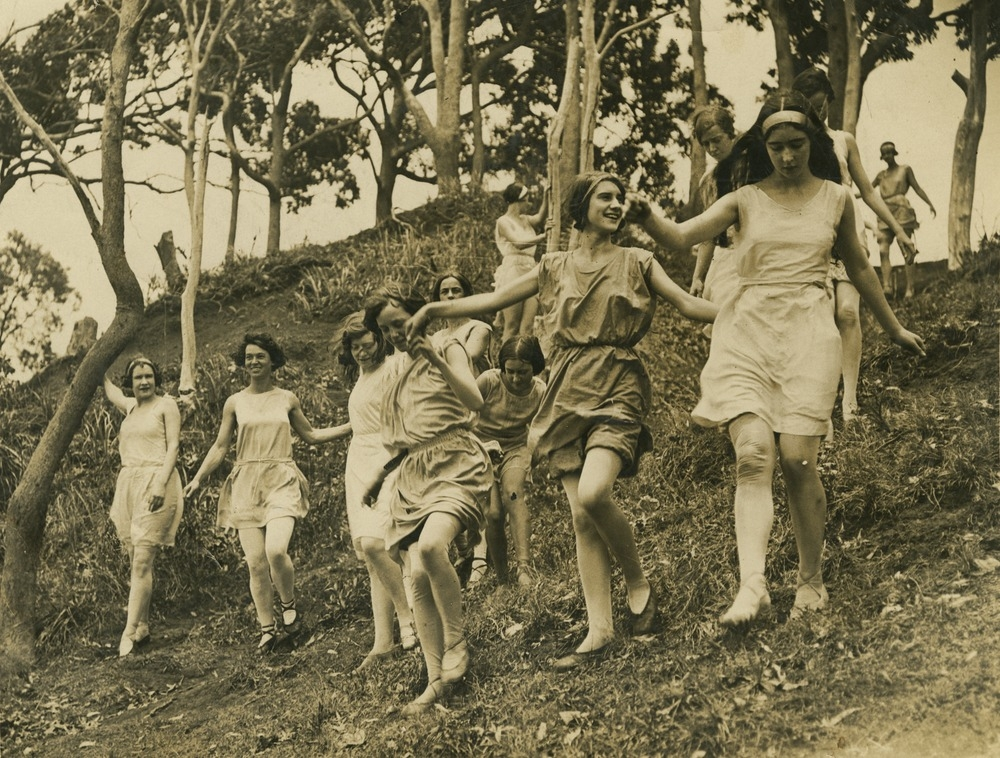
Girls attending the first ever summer school of classical ballet in Australia, organised by Hollinshed at Scarborough

== Publications ==
- In Search of Ballet. Brisbane: Boolarong Publications. 1987. ISBN 9780731601158. OCLC 21380868.
- Some Professional Dancers of, or from, Queensland and Some Teachers of the Past and Present. Brisbane: Smith & Paterson. 1963. OCLC 930214417.
