= Marilyn Jones (dancer) =

Australian ballerina

Marilyn Jones OBE
- Born: 17 February 1940 (age 86); Newcastle, New South Wales, Australia
- Spouse: Garth Welch
- Career
- Former groups: Royal Ballet; Borovansky Ballet; Australian Ballet

Marilyn Fay Jones OBE (born 17 February 1940) is an Australian dancer and teacher of dance. She has been described as "the greatest classical dancer Australia has produced".

== Training and career ==
Jones studied with Tessa Maunder in Newcastle then at the Royal Ballet School in London and danced with the Royal Ballet from 1957 to 1958. She was a principal artist with the Borovansky Ballet and was invited to join its successor, the Australian Ballet as a founding principal in 1962. She danced with the Australian Ballet as a prima ballerina until 1978, when she took up the position of Artistic Director of the company from 1979 to 1982. After receiving a Creative Arts Fellowship from the Australian Government, Jones founded the Australian Institute of Classical Dance in 1991 and became its artistic director. The AICD was set up to oversee and encourage the development of classical dance in Australia. Other appointments have included director of the National Theatre Youth Ballet (1996–98), and Director of the National Theatre Ballet School (Melbourne; 1995–98). She taught at the Western Academy of Performing Arts in 1999-2001.

== Honours ==
She was appointed an Officer of the Order of the British Empire on 1 January 1972 for her services to Australian ballet.

== Marriage and family ==
In 1963, Jones married fellow principal dancer Garth Welch and they had two sons, Stanton Welch and Damien Welch, who both became dancers. Stanton has since become a choreographer, and Artistic Director of the Houston Ballet. Damien was formerly a principal artist with The Australian Ballet, and has a son Oscar with Kirsty Martin, also a retired principal artist with the company.

== Books and articles ==
- Laughlin, Patricia Jean, Marilyn Jones, a brilliance all of her own, Quartet Books Australia, South Yarra, Victoria, 1978
- Kitcher, Barry, From Gaolbird to Lyrebird: a life in Australian ballet., Front Page, South Yarra, Victoria, 2001; revised and expanded eBook edition, BryshaWilsonPress, 2016.
- Who's Who in Australia, 2001, p. 967
- A sense of purpose: great Australian women of the 20th century, pp. 112–13.
