= Jodie-Anne White =

Australian dancer and choreographer

Jodie-Anne White-Bivona
- Born: 13 May 1967; Dandenong, Victoria, Australia
- Died: 21 January 2012 (aged 44 ) Brisbane, Australia
- Occupations: Ballet dancer; choreographer

Jodie-Anne White-Bivona (13 May 1967 – 21 January 2012) was an Australian dancer, choreographer and artistic director of the Ballet Theatre of Queensland.

== Training ==
White was born in Dandenong, Victoria and was raised in Melbourne, where she studied classical and contemporary dance, as well as acting and mime, at the Kathleen Gorham National Theatre, the Victorian College of the Arts and the Australian Ballet School.

== Dancing career ==
White danced with the Australian Ballet under the artistic direction of Maina Gielgud AO. White toured with the company to Asia, Russia, Greece, England and America. Her repertoire included the major classics as well as works from such choreographers as Jiri Kylian, Maurice Béjart and Sir Kenneth MacMillan.

As a soloist her career continued overseas with her acceptance into the Wiener Ballet Theatre. Shortly after arriving in Europe, she was promoted to Principal Artist. Principal Seasons began with the Brno National Ballet in Czech Republic, Theater Vorpommern in Greifswald, Germany and several other English and Italian companies. During this time she performed in works such as Giselle, Swan Lake, Sleeping Beauty, Carmen, Cinderella, Peer Gynt and several contemporary pieces with choreographers creating works for White. She was principal dancer 1999–2001 with Italian companies Balletto del Sud, Lecce and Teatro Lirico Giuseppe Verdi in Trieste where she returned regularly as a guest performer.

== Teacher ==
White taught and choreographed with her husband, Boris Bivona. They honed their skills through work both individually and together in the U.S., Europe and Australia. From 2002 to 2012 they were the Artistic Directors of Ballet Theatre of Queensland. They also worked in co-operation with Expressions Dance Company and with ongoing education programs with the Queensland Arts Council in collaboration with Queensland Ballet. White and Bivona had a teaching studio, Redland Dance, in Cleveland, Queensland.

== Death and legacy ==
Jodie White-Bivona died at home in Brisbane on 21 January 2012 from cancer, aged 44. She was survived by her husband Boris, a Palermo-born ballet dancer, director and choreographer.

The Jodie White-Bivona Memorial Scholarship is awarded each year to a dancer who has been with Ballet Theatre of Queensland for two consecutive years and "shows outstanding ability, dedication and a love of ballet – the true essence of what Ms Jodie stood for." The first recipient was Amy Radford in 2013.
