= Gillian Lynne =

English dancer, choreographer (1926–2018)

Dame Gillian Lynne DBE
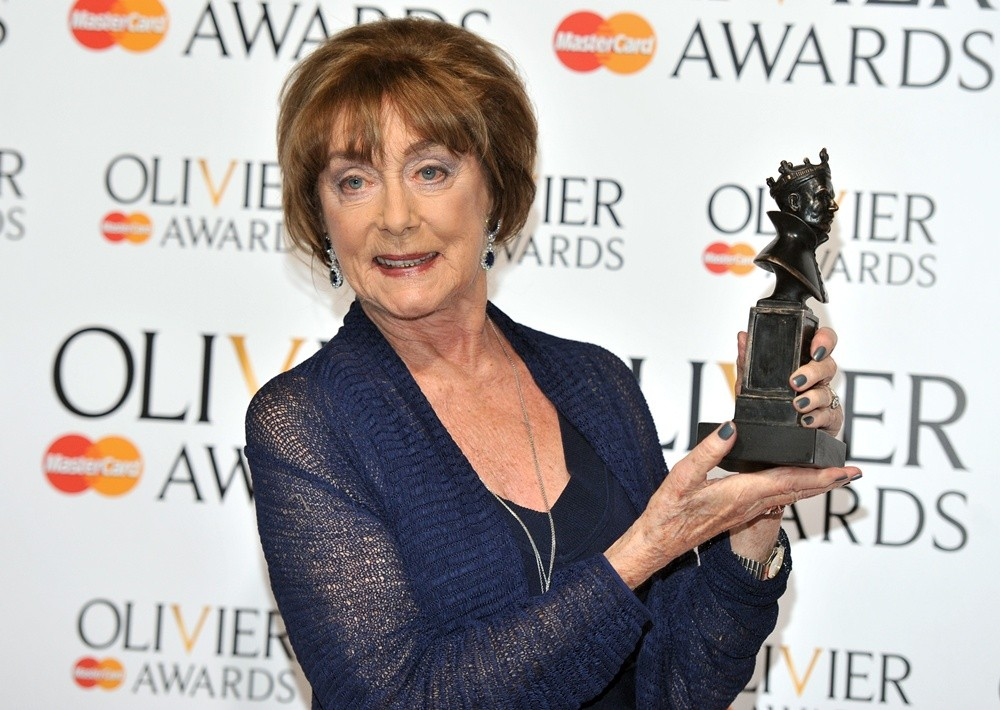
- Gillian Lynne at the Olivier Awards in 2013
- Born: Gillian Barbara Pyrke; 20 February 1926; Bromley, Kent, England
- Died: 1 July 2018 (aged 92); Marylebone, London, England
- Occupations: Ballerina; dancer; actress; theatre-television director; choreographer
- Years active: 1963–2011
- Spouses: Patrick Back (m. 1949; div. 19??); Peter Land (m. 1980)

Dame Gillian Barbara Lynne DBE (née Pyrke; 20 February 1926 – 1 July 2018) was an English ballerina, dancer, choreographer, actress, and theatre-television director, noted for her theatre choreography associated with two of the longest-running shows in Broadway history, Cats and The Phantom of the Opera. At age 87, she was made a DBE (Dame Commander of the Order of the British Empire) in the 2014 New Year Honours List.

The New London Theatre, where the original West End production of Cats played, was officially renamed the Gillian Lynne Theatre in 2018. This made Lynne the first non-royal woman to have a West End theatre named after her.

== Early life and education ==
Gillian Barbara Pyrke was born in Bromley, Kent, and was a precocious dance talent from an early age, teaming with her childhood friend Beryl Grey while still at school, and dancing to blot out the tragedy of the violent death of her mother on 8 July 1939 in Coventry (as a result of a car crash along with Edward Turner's first wife), when Lynne was just 13 years old.

Lynne's gift for dancing was discovered by a doctor. She had been underperforming at school, so her mother took her to the doctor and explained about her fidgeting and lack of focus. After hearing everything her mother said, the doctor told Lynne that he needed to talk to her mother privately for a moment. He turned on the radio and walked out. He then encouraged her mother to look at Lynne, who was dancing to the radio. The doctor noted that she was a dancer, and encouraged Lynne's mother to take her to dance school.

== Dancing career ==
=== Sadler's Wells Ballet ===
While dancing for Molly Lake's Company (the Ballet Guild) at the People's Palace, Lynne was spotted by Ninette de Valois and asked to join Sadler's Wells Ballet during World War II. With the opening of the Royal Opera House after the War she received her first major solo in Sleeping Beauty on the night of her 20th birthday. She went on to become an admired dramatic ballerina in the soon to be renamed Royal Ballet, renowned for her Black Queen in de Valois's Checkmate, Queen of the Wilis in Giselle and roles created for her by Frederick Ashton and Robert Helpmann.

=== West End, film and television ===
Leaving Sadler's Wells Ballet in 1951 she was an instant success at the London Palladium as the star dancer and subsequently in the West End in such roles as Claudine in Can-Can at the Coliseum Theatre. She appeared in the film The Master of Ballantrae as Mariane, in which she was cast opposite Errol Flynn and directed by William Keighley. She also appeared as both a dancer and actress on early British Television.

== Choreography and direction ==
In her long career as a choreographer and director, Lynne worked on many productions including those from the Royal Opera House, Royal Shakespeare Company and English National Opera as well as many West End and Broadway shows. In 1970 she choreographed and directed the Nottingham Playhouse production of the musical, Love on the Dole. Originally a novel by Walter Greenwood, it was made into a musical starring Eric Flynn and Angela Richards. In 1975 she arrived in Australia to create The Australian Ballet's first work expressly commissioned for television, The Fool on the Hill. She may be best known for her work on Andrew Lloyd Webber's musicals Cats (1981), The Phantom of the Opera (1986) and Aspects of Love (1990).

She was also a prolific television choreographer and director notably for The Muppet Show series and winning the 1987 BAFTA Huw Wheldon Award for her direction and choreography of A Simple Man, which starred Moira Shearer. She choreographed the Royal Shakespeare Company production of The Secret Garden, which ran at Stratford in 2000 and then transferred to the West End, running at the Aldwych Theatre from February 2001 to June 2001.

In 2002, Lynne choreographed the Sherman Brothers' stage musical Chitty Chitty Bang Bang (based on the 1968 film). It played in London, and later on Broadway in 2005, both times successfully. Chitty Chitty Bang Bang brought her back to the London Palladium after 50 years and she rehearsed cast changes for the show's National UK Tour. Lynne choreographed the 90-minute Las Vegas Production of The Phantom of the Opera which opened in the Summer of 2006, and directed I Want to Teach the World to Sing! Gala at Her Majesty's Theatre and musically staged The Imaginary Invalid for the Shakespeare Theatre Company in Washington, D.C. in 2008. In September 2009, she was in New York City celebrating a Phantom of the Opera milestone at the Majestic Theatre. During this visit, she worked in a rehearsal with the company of the 2009–2010 international tour of Cats, produced by Troika Entertainment.

In October 2011, Lynne choreographed the 25th Anniversary production of The Phantom of the Opera at the Royal Albert Hall. She was both choreographer and director for the musical Dear World, which played an engagement at The Charing Cross Theatre, London, in February and March 2013, and starred Betty Buckley. Her production company continues to produce television, film and stage productions.

== Major stage credits ==
- Ballet Guild (1942–1944) – Soloist
- Sadler's Wells Ballet (1944–1951) – Leading Soloist
- London Palladium (1951–1954) – Star Dancer
- Can-Can (1954) – Claudine
- New Cranks (1960) – Cast
- Rose-Marie (1960) – Wanda
- England Our England (1960–61) – Stager
- Puss in Boots (1962) – Queen of Catland
- Collages (1963) – Conceived/Director/Choreographer/Performer
- Round Leicester Square (1963) – Director
- The Roar of the Greasepaint—the Smell of the Crowd (1965) – Choreographer
- Pickwick (1965) – Musical Stager/Choreographer
- The Matchgirls (1966) – Director/Choreographer
- The Flying Dutchman (1966) – Choreographer
- Bluebeard (1966) – Director/Choreographer
- How Now Dow Jones (1967) – Choreographer
- The Midsummer Marriage (1968) – Choreographer
- The Trojans (1969) – Choreographer
- Phil The Fluter (1969) – Musical Stager/Choreographer
- Love on the Dole (1970) – Director/Choreographer
- Tonight at 8.30 (1970–71) – Director
- Ambassador (1971) – Musical Stager/Choreographer
- Lillywhite Lies (1971) – Director
- Liberty Ranch (1972) – Director/Choreographer
- Once Upon A Time (1972) – Director/Choreographer
- The Card (1973) – Musical Stager/Choreographer
- Hans Christian Andersen (1974) – Musical Stager/Choreographer
- The Fool on the Hill (ballet) (1975) – Choreographer
- The Comedy of Errors (1976) – Musical Stager
- A Midsummer Night's Dream (1977) – Co-director
- As You Like It (1977) – Musical Stager
- The Way of the World (1978) – Choreographer
- My Fair Lady (1978) – Musical Stager/Choreographer
- Thuis Best (1978) – Director/Choreographer
- Parsifal (1979) – Choreographer
- Once in a Lifetime (1979) – Musical Stager/Choreographer
- Songbook (1979) – Musical Stager
- Jeeves Takes Charge (1980) – Director
- Tom Foolery (1980) – Director/Choreographer
- To Those Born Later (1981) – Director
- Cats (1981) – Associate Director/Choreographer
- La Ronde (1982) – Additional Director
- Alone Plus One (1982) – Director/Performer
- The Rehearsal (1983) – Director
- The Phantom of the Opera (1986) – Musical Stager/Choreographer
- Cabaret (1986) – Director/Choreographer
- Faust (1990) – Choreographer
- Aspects of Love (1990) – Choreographer
- Dance for Life Gala (1991) – Director/Producer
- Valentine's Day (1991) – Director/Choreographer
- Pickwick (1993) – Musical Stager/Choreographer
- That's What Friends Are For! (1996) – Director
- Avow (1996) – Director
- What the World Needs Now (1998) – Director/Choreographer
- Gigi (1999) – Director/Choreographer
- Dick Wittington (1999) – Director/Choreographer (Sadler's Wells)
- The Secret Garden (2000) – Musical Stager/Choreographer
- Chitty Chitty Bang Bang (2002 & 2005) – Musical Stager/Choreographer

== Film credits ==
- The Master of Ballantrae (1953) – Actress/Choreographer
- The Last Man to Hang? (1956) – Actress
- Make Mine a Million (1959) – Actress
- Wonderful Life (1963–64) – Musical Stager/Choreographer
- Every Day's a Holiday (1965) – Musical Stager/Choreographer
- Three Hats for Lisa (1964) – Musical Stager/Choreographer
- Half a Sixpence (1967) – Musical Stager/Choreographer
- Mister Ten Per Cent (1967) – Choreographer
- 200 Motels (1971) – Musical Stager
- Mr. Love (1972) – Stager/Choreographer
- Man of La Mancha (1972) – Choreographer
- Under Milk Wood (1972) – Musical Stager/Choreographer
- The Old Curiosity Shop (1974) – Musical Stager
- Yentl (1982) – Musical Stager
- Alice in Wonderland (1985) – Choreographer
- European Vacation (1985) – Musical Stager/Choreographer
- Cats (1997) – Musical Stager/Choreographer

== Personal life ==
Lynne married her second husband, actor/singer Peter Land in 1980.

It was love at first sight: they met when he got a part in a production of My Fair Lady that she co-directed in 1978. "He was standing there at the bar, and he was drop-dead gorgeous. We just looked at each other..."

— The Guardian

The first volume of her autobiography, A Dancer in Wartime was published on 3 November 2011 in the UK by Chatto & Windus.

Lynne died on 1 July 2018 at a London hospital from pneumonia, aged 92.

== Awards, honours and nominations ==
She has won, and been nominated for, numerous awards for her work. She has received the Silver Order of Merit, Golden Rose of Montreux Award, BAFTA, Molière Award and The Queen Elizabeth II Coronation Award by the Royal Academy of Dance (2001). She received a Special Award at the 2013 Olivier Awards.

She was appointed Commander of the Order of the British Empire (CBE) in the 1997 Birthday Honours and Dame Commander of the Order of the British Empire (DBE) in the 2014 New Year Honours for services to dance and musical theatre.

Lynne was nominated for the Tony Award twice for Choreography, for Cats and The Phantom of the Opera, and for the Drama Desk Award for Cats. She received the Olivier Award in 1981, for Outstanding Achievement of the Year in Musicals, for Cats.

In 2018, The New London Theatre was renamed the Gillian Lynne Theatre, making it the first theatre in the West End of London to be named after a non-royal woman.
