= Opéra de Nice =

French opera house

Coordinates: 43°41′44″N 7°16′21″E

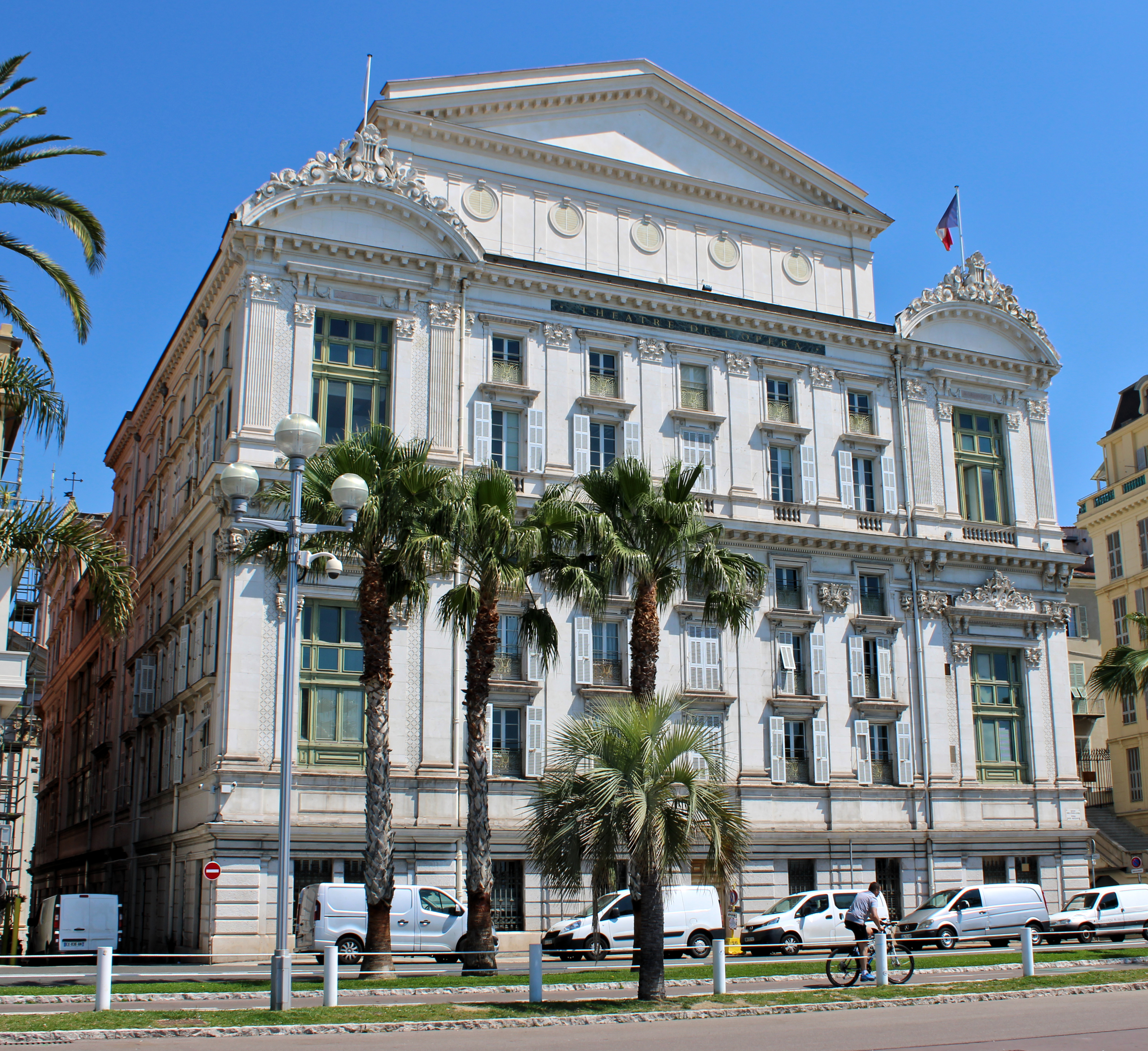
Southern façade of the opera house

The Opéra de Nice is the principal opera venue in Nice, France, which houses the Ballet Nice Méditerrannée and the Nice Philharmonic Orchestra. It offers three types of performances: operas, ballets and classical music concerts.

== History ==
The “petit théâtre en bois” (wooden theatre) was first created in 1776 by Marquess Alli-Maccarani. Sold in 1787 to a group of gentry, it reopened in 1790 under the name “Théâtre Royal”.

In 1826, the city of Nice, encouraged by King Charles Félix, bought it from its owners and had it demolished and rebuilt. It was inaugurated in 1828 with Giovanni Pacini's Il Barone di Bolsheim.

In 1856, a great ball was organized in the honour of King Victor Emmanuel II.

In 1860, Napoleon III was invited to attend an evening at the Théâtre Royal. For this special occasion, Johann Strauss led the orchestra. The same year, the theatre became the “Théâtre Impérial”. In 1864, Napoleon III returned, accompanied by Tsar Alexander II of Russia. In 1868, Louis II, Duke of Bavaria attended a performance of Cendrillon. The Théâtre Royal was renamed “Théâtre Municipal” in 1870.

On Wednesday, March 23, 1881, as the opera Lucia di Lammermoor began, a gas leak started a huge fire. The fire was controlled the next day but there was nothing left of the theatre. Three siblings of Marjory Kennedy-Fraser died in the fire: Lizzie, Kate and James (soprano, contralto and baritone respectively). The city of Nice immediately decided to rebuild another theatre on the same site. It was designed by architect François Aune with the apparent approval of Charles Garnier, the architect of the Paris Opera. On February 7, 1885, the Théâtre Municipal re-opened with Verdi’s Aida. Over the following years it hosted the French stage premieres of operas such as A Life for the Tsar, Eugene Onegin, La Gioconda, Manon Lescaut, Marie-Magdeleine, Katerina Ismailova and Elegy for Young Lovers. Artistic directors included Edoardo Sonzogno (1887–88), Raoul Gunsbourg (1889-91) and Ferdinand Aymé (1950–82). Musical directors included Alexandre Luigini (1888–89 and 1897–98), Albert Wolff (1930–32 and 1934–37), Antonio de Almeida (1976–78) and Pierre Dervaux (1978-82).

In 1902, it was named Opéra de Nice and is today referred to as Opéra Nice Côte d’Azur.

With the support of the Médecin family of Nice, the house flourished, attracting major singers and directors in opera, but despite the efforts of Jean-Albert Cartier from 1994 to 1997, the importance of the house declined.

== 21st century ==
From 2001 to 2009 the director-general was the Belgian producer Paul-Émile Fourny. He was succeeded by Jacques Hédouin, with a policy of closer working with the Opéra de Monte-Carlo, as well as closer collaboration with the two regional orchestras, the Orchestre philharmonique de Nice and the Orchestre régional de Cannes-Provence-Alpes-Côte d'Azur.

In November 2012, Marc Adam became the new artistic director of the opera. The same month tenor Jonas Kaufmann performed there. Adam departed in 2015 to be replaced by Eric Chevalier.

The Diacosmie is the workshop of the Opéra de Nice, where everything from costumes to sets is created. The building also houses rehearsal rooms for the Nice Philharmonic Orchestra and the Ballet Nice Méditerranée.
