= Marilyn Rowe =

Australian ballet dancer

Marilyn Patricia Rowe AM OBE (born 20 August 1946) is the first graduate of the Australian Ballet School to be appointed its director, in 1999.

== Dancing career ==
Rowe was born in Sydney, New South Wales and became a principal artist with The Australian Ballet in 1969, joining the company at the express wish of the founding artistic director of the Australian Ballet, Dame Peggy van Praagh, after a relatively short time as a student in the Australian Ballet School. Rowe talked about her association with the Australian Ballet and van Praagh,

"I grew up as it were, in the cradle of Australian Ballet – it is my family and I love it warts and all. I have been part of its highs and lows, which at times seemed to be reflected in my own life. I was there through its darkest hours and then helped to pick up the pieces. I have a great passion and loyalty for my company and its school, instilled in me by Peggy. She herself possessed these qualities in abundance."

Rowe had an acclaimed partnership with dancer Kelvin Coe OBE. Marilyn and Kelvin won individual silver medals and the award for the most outstanding couple at the Second International Ballet Competition in Moscow in 1973. Roles were specially created for her include Glen Tetley's Gemini, Ronald Hynd's The Merry Widow and André Prokovsky's Anna Karenina. Rowe also had successful partnerships with Australian Ballet dancers Gary Norman and John Meehan. in 1968 Rowe received her first invitation to Russia from Igor Moiseyev, who choreographed The Last Vision for her and Kelvin Coe. In 1971 Rudolf Nureyev coached Marilyn and Kevin in the leading roles of his production of Don Quixote for their debut in New York. In 1978 Rowe and Coe became the first Australians to be invited to dance with the Bolshoi, Riga and Vilnius ballet companies.

in 1976 Marilyn was invited by the Australian Prime Minister to participate in The Rights of a Child concert presented at the United Nations General Assembly Hall in New York. in 1977 she performed at the Royal Variety Performance for the Prince of Wales. She was a guest artist with the National Ballet of the Philippines and in 1978 danced the leading role in Swan Lake for Princess Alexandra and Angus Ogilvy.

In 1980 Marilyn was awarded the Order of the British Empire, OBE, for services to dance.

After the Dancers' strike in 1981, at the insistence of the dancers and the Board of The Australian Ballet, Marilyn Rowe was appointed to the position of Ballet Director/Acting Artistic Director and Guest Artist. She then held the position of Deputy Artistic Director and Director of the Dancers Company.

In 1986 she was chosen by Lord Lichfield to be photographed for his collection of Australia's most beautiful women. She is also the recipient of two Green Room Awards and an ADAMS Award for most outstanding dancer.

In 1982 Marilyn was appointed to the Australian Government's Immigration Review Panel; appointed to The Australian Ballet's National Council and the Dance Panel of the Victorian Ministry for the Arts.

In 1990 Marilyn was appointed Artistic Advisor and Specialist Coach to The Australian Ballet School and a member of its Advisory Board. She was appointed a Director of The Australian Ballet Board in 1994.

Marilyn was appointed Director of the Australian Ballet School in 1999, a position she held for 16 years, retiring after the School's 50th Anniversary.

== Director, Teacher and the Australian Ballet School ==
After a career where she danced all the major roles in the company repertoire she went on to hold the titles of Ballet Director, Deputy Artistic Director and in 1984 Director of the Dancers Company. Rowe continued with the Dancers Company until 1990. She was appointed to the Board of the Australian Ballet in 1994. She has been responsible for directing many of the leading dancers of the Australian Ballet. In addition she been responsible for bringing into the repertoire a large number of modern and classical ballets. Rowe was appointed Director of the Australian Ballet School in 1999.

In 2003 Marilyn was included in the First Honour Role for Women, which honours her contribution to Victoria and the Nation. In 2013 she received the Lord mayor's certificate of Commendation presented by the City of Melbourne; in 2014 she was honoured with a plaque, by being included in The Walk of Fame, as part of Melbourne Arts walk.

in 2015 The Australian ballet School's residences was named in her honour and she received the Lifetime Achievement Award at the Australian Dance Awards.

Marilyn has been a member of the jury for the Prix de Lausanne, the Youth America Grand Prix, the Asian Pacific International Ballet Competition, the Beijing International Competition for Dance Schools and presently, the Asian Grand Prix International Ballet Competition.

== Honours ==
To mark her contribution to ballet in Australia, Rowe was appointed an Officer of the Order of the British Empire (OBE) in 1980. Two Green Room Awards and an Adams Award The First Victorian Honour Role for Women, which honours her contribution to Victoria and the Nation. 2003 The Lord Mayor's Certificate of Commendation presented by the City of Melbourne for her significant contribution to the arts. 2013 Honoured with a plaque by being included in the Walk of Fame as part of the Melbourne Arts Walk. 2014 The Lifetime Achievement Award at the Australian Dance Awards. 2015 Marilyn Rowe House, the residence of The Australian Ballet School, named in her honour 2015
