= André Prokovsky =

Franco-Russian ballet dancer, choreographer, and company director

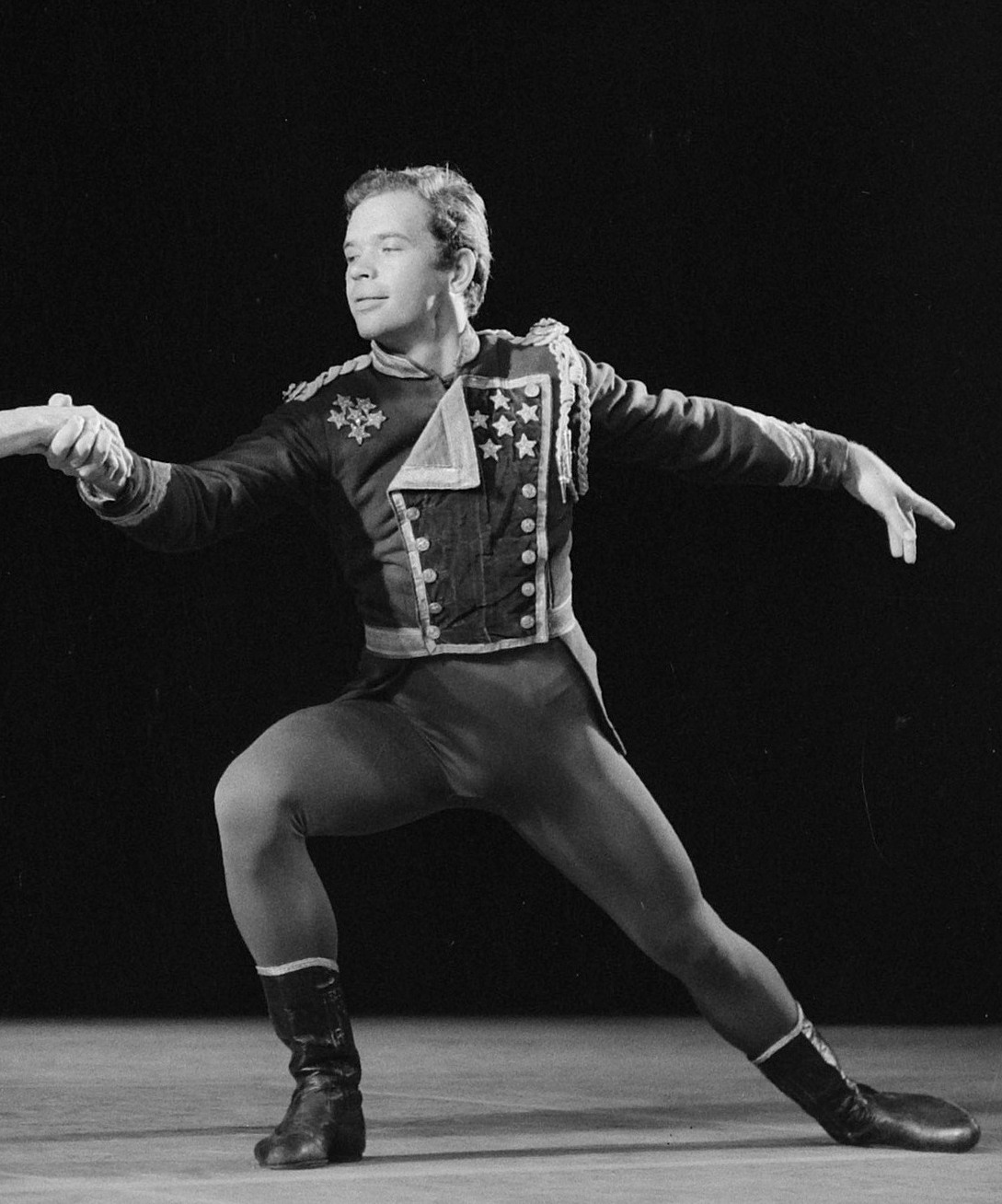
Andre Prokovsky in 1965

André Prokovsky (13 January 1939 – 15 August 2009) was a Franco-Russian ballet dancer, choreographer, and company director. Admired as a bravura performer and an innovative choreographer, he had a varied career that was broadly international in scope.

== Biography ==
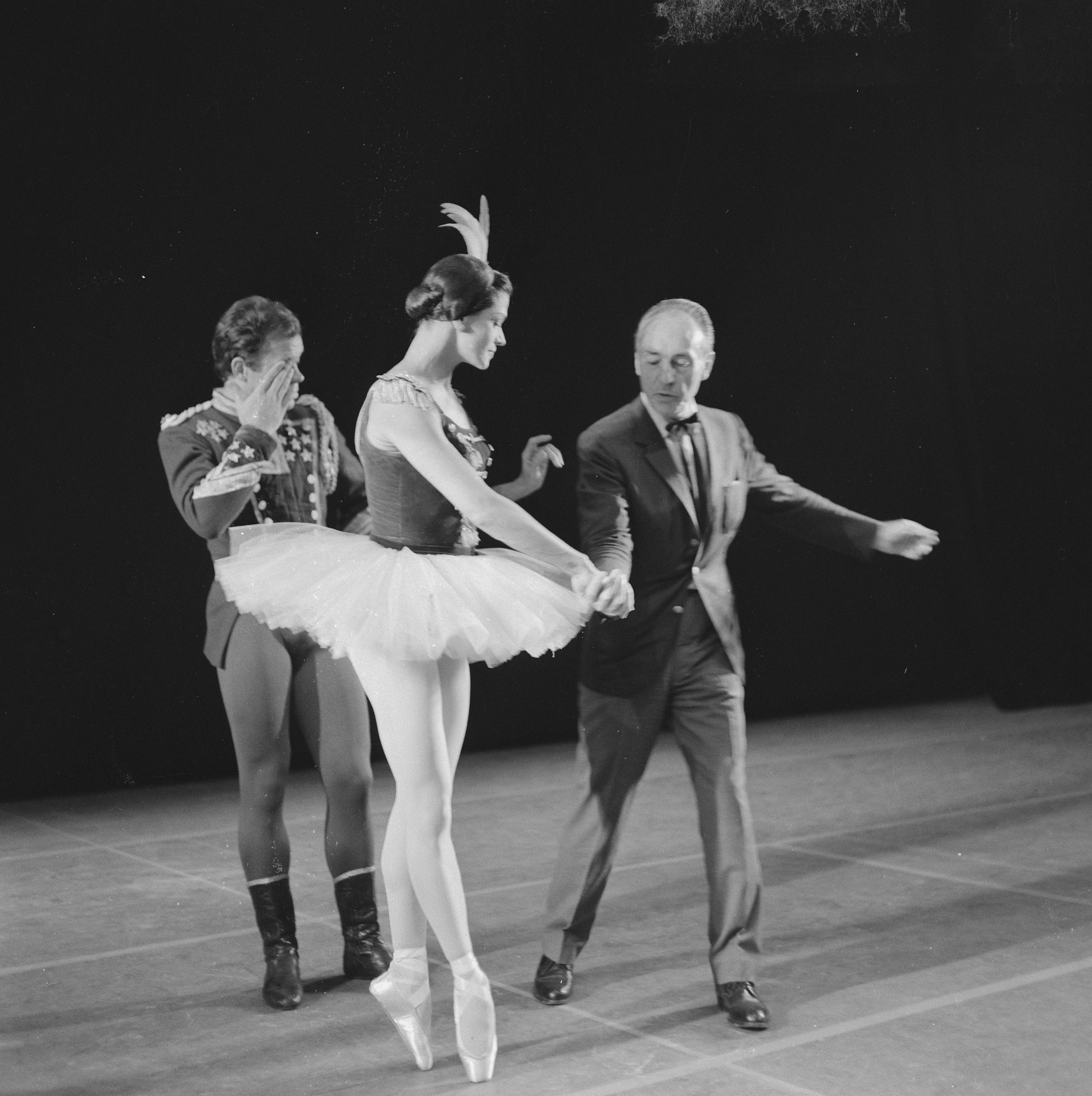
With George Balanchine and Melissa Hayden (Amsterdam, 1965)

Born in Paris to Russian parents, Prokovsky began ballet training in his youth, studying with some of the leading teachers in Paris, including Lubov Egorova, Nora Kiss, Serge Peretti, and Nicholas Zvereff. At age fifteen, he made his stage debut with the Comédie-Française in a 1954 production of Molière's Les Amants Magnifiques. He then danced in ballet troupes directed by Jeanine Charrat, Jean Babilee, and Roland Petit before joining the London Festival Ballet as a soloist in 1957. Despite his stocky physique, he had developed great technical control in his dancing and was capable of performing multiple pirouettes and high, soaring leaps. His astonishing virtuosity in the original cast of Anton Dolin's Variations for Four in 1957 and in Harald Lander's Études in 1958 won him promotion to principal dancer. He quickly became a favorite of English audiences, dancing leading roles in The Nutcracker, Napoli, Swan Lake, and Don Quixote, among others.

In 1960, Prokovsky left London to return to Paris, where he joined Le Grand Ballet du Marquis de Cuevas as principal dancer in a new production of The Sleeping Beauty. In 1963, he moved to America, having been invited by George Balanchine to join New York City Ballet. As a principal dancer in that company, he appeared in many Balanchine works, including Symphony in C, Scotch Symphony, Gounod Symphony, and Stars and Stripes. He created roles in two works by Jacques d'Amboise, The Chase (1963) and Irish Fantasy (1964), and in two works by Balanchine, Pas de Deux and Divertissement (1965), set to music of Delibes, and Brahms-Schoenberg Quartet (1966). In both new Balanchine works his partner was the brilliant Melissa Hayden, a leading ballerina of the company.

Throughout the early 1960s, Prokovsky also had many engagements as an international guest artist with ballet companies in Stuttgart, Rome, Belgrade, Zagreb, Zurich, Munich, Dallas, Washington, D.C., and other cities. One especially fortuitous invitation came in 1966 from PACT/TRUK Ballet in Johannesburg, South Africa, which wanted him for Prince Charming in a new production of Cinderella. The choreographer was to be Françoise Adret, with whom he had worked in London, and the ballerina was to be Galina Samsova, from London Festival Ballet, whom he had previously met in Marseille. The production proved successful, and dancing with Samsova suited Prokovsky very well, as her sparkling virtuosity matched his own. He consequently quit New York City Ballet and, later in 1966, rejoined London Festival Ballet, where he continued his partnership with Samsova to great acclaim for some years.

Prokovsky and Samsova left London Festival Ballet to form their own company, the New London Ballet. A small troupe of only fourteen dancers, it toured Britain, Europe, Asia, South America, and the United States with a repertory including Prokovsky's first choreographic works. Among them were Bagatelles (1972; music, Beethoven), Vespri (1973; music, Verdi), Folk Songs (1974; music, Berio), Soft Blue Shadows (1975; music, Fauré), and Faust Divertimento (1976; music, Gounod), created in collaboration with Samsova. The company, which typically received favorable reviews, flourished for several years but was forced to disband when it encountered dire financial problems in 1977.

Thereafter, Prokovsky served as ballet director of the Rome Opera for two years and then devoted himself to choreography, particularly evening-length productions of familiar stories from literature or opera. He spent his last years as a freelance choreographer, staging his ballets for companies around the world.

== Personal life ==
Prokovsky married ballerina Galina Samsova in 1972. They divorced in 1981. In retirement, Prokovsky settled near Beausoleil, a winter resort in southeastern France. In 2009, he died at home, of cancer, at age seventy. He was survived by his wife Elvire and a son.

== Major works ==
- 1975: The Seven Deadly Sins (music, Weill), PACT/TRUK Ballet, Johannesburg
- 1979: Anna Karenina (music, Tchaikovsky), Australian Ballet, Melbourne
- 1980: The Three Musketeers (music, Verdi), Australian Ballet, Sydney
- 1983: Zhivago (music, Rimsky-Korsakov, Borodin), CAPAB Ballet, Cape Town
- 1985: Romeo and Juliet (music, Berlioz), London City Ballet
- 1986: Swan Lake (music, Tchaikovsky), Northern Ballet Theatre, Glyndebourne
- 1987: The Great Gatsby (music, Schuller), Pittsburgh Ballet Theatre
- 1989: La Traviata (music, Verdi), London City Ballet
- 1991: Macbeth (music, Earl), Ballet de Santiago
- 2001: Turandot (music, Puccini), Guangzhou Ballet Company, Canton
