= Alan Alder =

Australian ballet dancer and teacher (1937–2019)

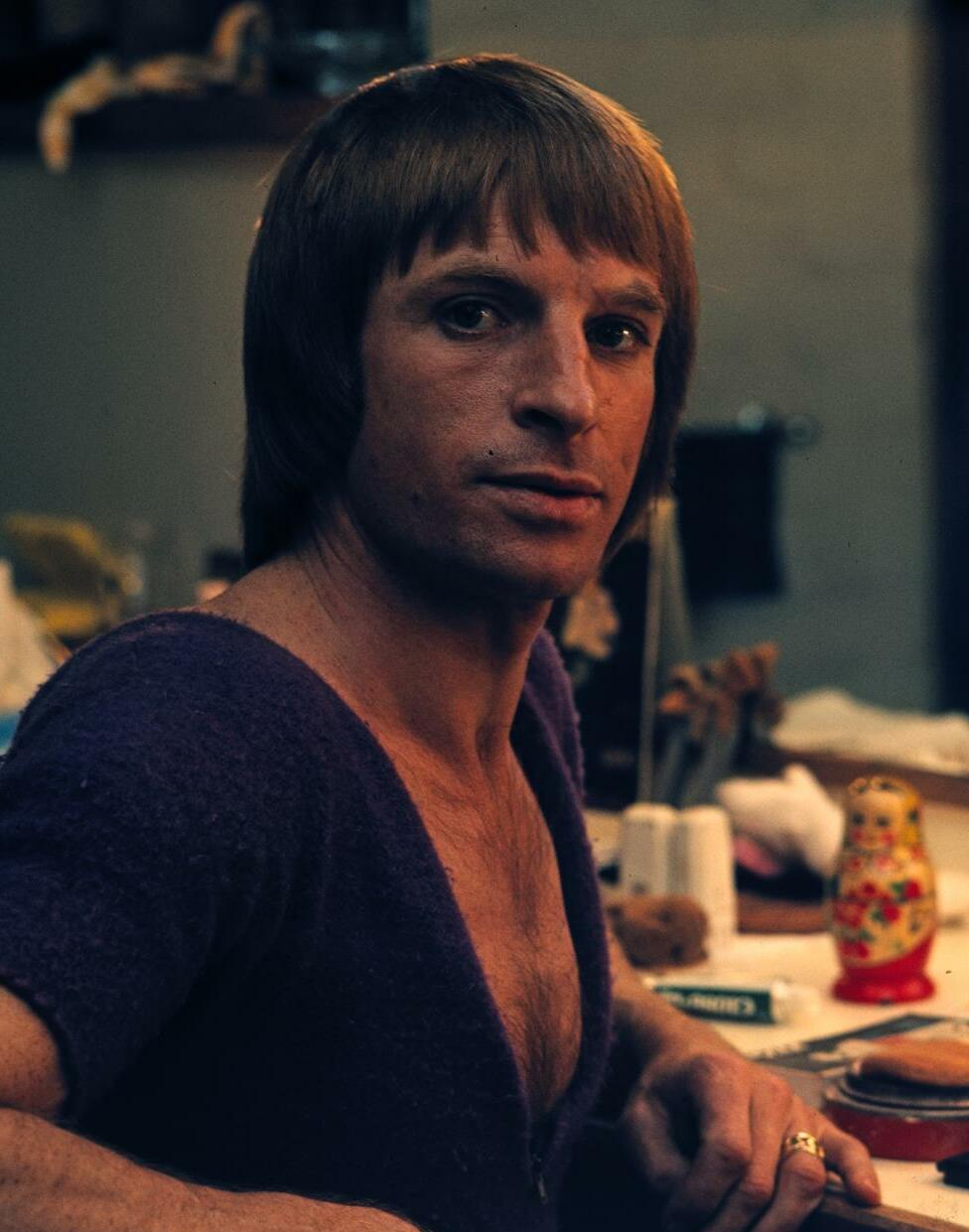
Alder in 1973

Alan Richard Alder (14 September 1937 – 15 July 2019) was an Australian ballet dancer and ballet teacher.

Alder was born in Canberra in 1937. After training that included a scholarship to the Royal Ballet School, twelve months with the Covent Garden Opera Ballet and touring internationally as soloist with Sadler's Wells Royal Ballet, Alder returned to Australia in 1963 and rose to principal artist and then guest artist with the Australian Ballet.

In 1972 he married fellow artist Lucette Aldous and appeared with her in the Nureyev filmed production of Don Quixote. Alan held the position Head of Dance at the Western Australian Academy of Performing Arts, Edith Cowan University Perth, Western Australia, from 1983 to 1991.

Alder died on 15 July 2019 aged 82.
