= Jean-Albert Cartier =

French art critic and director of cultural institutions

Jean-Albert Cartier (15 May 1930 – 27 December 2015) was a French art critic and director of cultural institutions. He was director of the Paris Opera from 1989 to 1991.

== Life ==
Born in Marseille, passionate about the visual arts, Cartier studied at the École du Louvre. He was an art critic for 15 years at Combat.

In 1968, he founded the Ballet-Théâtre contemporain, then successively became director of the Grand Théâtre d'Angers and of the Centre national de danse contemporaine of Angers (1972-1978), director of the Ballet-Théâtre of Nancy (1978-1987). Cartier was also director of the Théâtre musical de Paris (1980-1988), administrator of the Paris Opera (1989-1991), delegate for music programmes at the music directorate at Radio France (1991-1993), general director of the Opéra de Nice (1994-1997), founder of the Europa Danse Project of Grasse in 1999 and president of the International Dance Institute with the Unesco.

In 1987, he was nominated "Prix de la personnalité musicale de l'année du Syndicat de la critique".

== Works ==
- Le Manteau d'Arlequin, prefaces by Gérard Fromanger, Jiří Kylián and Jorge Lavelli. Paris, Éditions de l’Amandier, 304 p. ISBN 978-2-35516-261-9
- Modigliani. Nus, (Petite encyclopédie de l'art, 18), Paris, abc Fernand Hazan, 1958.
