= Australian Ballet School =

Coordinates: 37.821801°S 144.967594°E

The Australian Ballet School

Location
- 2 Kavanagh Street; Southbank, Melbourne, Victoria, 3006; Australia

Information
- School type: Private
- Established: 1964 (age 61–62)
- Founder: Dame Margaret Scott
- Status: Active
- Specialist: Vocational Classical Ballet
- Director: Megan Connelly
- Executive Director: Sarah Hunt
- Gender: Co-educational
- Feeder to: The Australian Ballet
- Website: australianballetschool.com.au

The Australian Ballet School is the premier ballet training facility in Australia, located in Melbourne.

== History ==
The Australian Ballet School was founded in 1964 as the primary training facility for The Australian Ballet by Dame Margaret Scott AC DBE.

== Location ==
It is part of the Primrose Potter Australian Ballet Centre, which is located in the Melbourne Arts Precinct, Southbank in Melbourne, Victoria.

== Governance and funding ==
The school is a registered charity, with about a third of its income provided by the Australian Government, about a third by tuition fees, and the rest via philanthropy, corporate support and box office. It is one of eight "national elite training organisations" funded by the Office for the Arts as part of its or ARTS8 (Australian Roundtable for Arts Training Excellence) group of colleges.

== Education ==
The Australian Ballet School is a registered training organisation. The Australian Ballet company draws 95% of its dancers from the school, and many graduates dance as principals and soloists around the world.

Offered are:

- an eight-year course for talented students.
- After School Program (Levels 1–3), for students generally between 10 and 13 years of age. Classes take place after school hours and on Saturdays.
- Interstate/International Training Program (Levels 1–4), for students generally between 8 and 14 years of age who are gifted in dance but live interstate or internationally. There are limited spots in Level four for talented students who are not yet ready to leave home.
- Full-Time Program (Levels 4–8), for students generally between 13 and 19 years of age. Level 4 is taken in conjunction with academic year 9 at the nearby Victorian College of the Arts Secondary School (VCASS). For the younger students, approximately half the day consists of dance classes and the other half consists of academic classes, Monday to Friday with half a day of dance classes on Saturday.

== Audition process ==
Prospective students must audition for entry to the school.

== Annual Tour with The Australian Ballet ==
Since 1980, students in the graduate year (Level 8) of the school can take part in The Australian Ballet's national tours.

== Boarding Program ==
Marilyn Rowe House is the school's boarding house for students aged 13–18.

== Directors ==
- Dame Margaret Scott AC DBE (1964–1990)
- Gailene Stock AM (1990–1998)
- Marilyn Rowe AM OBE (1998–2014)
- Lisa Pavane (2015–2024)
- Megan Connelly (2024–present) (as of April 2026)

== Notable alumni ==
- Stephen Baynes
- Ann Burbrook
- Christina Davis
- Madeleine Eastoe
- Roma Egan
- Beverly Jane Fry
- Kip Gamblin
- Jason Gardiner
- Ella Havelka
- Margaret Illmann
- Janet Karin
- Goh Soo Khim
- Ako Kondo
- Marilyn Ledwidge
- Tracy Li
- Kirsty Martin
- David McAllister, AM
- John Meehan
- Graeme Murphy, AM
- Gideon Obarzanek
- Hannah O'Neill
- Emilie de Ravin
- Danielle Rowe
- Marilyn Rowe, OBE
- Amber Scott
- Hugh Sheridan
- Ian Spink
- Garry Stewart
- Ross Stretton
- Meryl Tankard
- Leigh Warren
- Marisa Warrington
- Jodie-Anne White
- Elisha Willis
