= The Fool on the Hill (ballet) =

1976 ballet by Gillian Lynne & John Lanchbery

- Choreographer: Gillian Lynne
- Music: John Lanchbery
- Based on: The Fool on the Hill (song by the Beatles
- Premiere: January 1976 (TV production); 28 April 1976 (stage production); Sydney Opera House, Australia
- Original ballet company: The Australian Ballet
- Characters: Eleanor Rigby; Sergeant Pepper; LSD; Platitudinists
- Created for: Television

The Fool on the Hill is a ballet created by British choreographer Gillian Lynne.

== Television production ==
In 1975 Gillian Lynne arrived in Australia to create The Australian Ballet's first work expressly commissioned for television which was jointly commissioned by The Australian Ballet and the Australian Broadcasting Corporation. The Fool on the Hill ballet was inspired by the Beatles' song of the same name, and the score was arranged and orchestrated by John Lanchbery, using interpretations of Beatles' songs and featuring characters like Eleanor Rigby, and Sergeant Pepper. The director of the television production was Bryan Ashbridge. Robert Helpmann appeared as Sergeant Pepper in the original television ballet.

The ballet won a number of international television awards.

== Stage production ==
The ballet was later revised for stage performances. It premiered as a live stage production at the Sydney Opera House on 28 April 1976.
