= Gailene Stock =

Australian ballet teacher (1946–2014)

Gailene Stock CBE AM
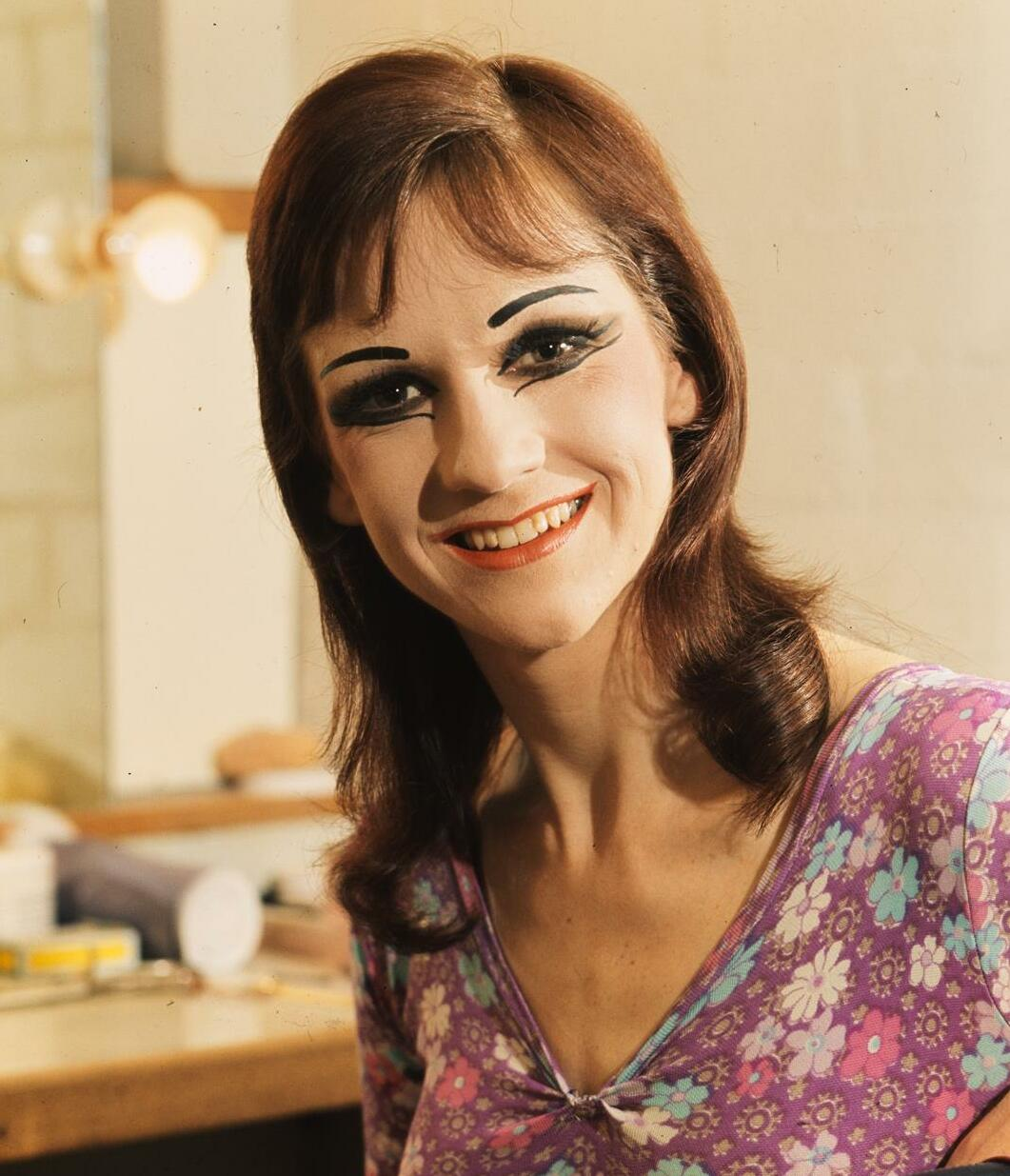
- Stock in 1973
- Born: Gailene Patricia Stock; 28 January 1946; Ballarat, Victoria, Australia
- Died: 29 April 2014 (aged 68); London, England, UK
- Education: Australian Ballet
- Occupations: Ballet dancer; teacher; director
- Spouse: Gary Norman
- Children: 1

Gailene Stock CBE AM (28 January 1946 – 29 April 2014) was an Australian-born ballerina, teacher and Director of the Royal Ballet School in Covent Garden.

== Early years ==
Gailene Patricia Stock was born in Ballarat, Victoria. She was the second of three daughters to Roy and Sylvia. She began dancing from the age of three. However, she contracted polio at the age of 8, which left her in hospital in an iron frame for 18 months. Remarkably, she was dancing again by the time she was 12, attending the school of Paul Hammond, formerly a leading soloist with the Borovansky Ballet.

Two years later, however, she had another setback when she suffered serious injury - a fractured skull and jaw - following a collision between a cement lorry and her father's car; she was left in a coma for three days. She had been due to take her Royal Academy of Dance exam. Incredibly, she recovered and passed her exam with "commendation".

== Rise to Principal Dancer ==
In 1962, at the age of 16, Stock was awarded a Royal Academy of Dance scholarship to London's Royal Ballet School, but at the same time, Dame Peggy van Praagh had just founded The Australian Ballet and she decided to offer Gailene a job and so Stock deferred her London trip to the following year. After a year in London, she was offered a position with The Royal Ballet. She decided, however, to return to The Australian Ballet, where she spent 7 years, rising to principal dancer under director Robert Helpmann.

When The Australian Ballet embarked on its first European tour in 1965, Stock was part of the company, and toured on subsequent tours, including one to the United States, during which many dancers sustained injuries. On that tour, Stock recalled, she did 69 performances in 69 days.

She later went on to dance for three years in Canada as principal ballerina with the National Ballet of Canada and the Royal Winnipeg Ballet. She was pursued to North America by an Australian colleague, Gary Norman, whom she married. The pair returned to The Australian Ballet and resumed their dancing careers. After having their daughter in 1978, she moved into teaching and management. Stock then was named director of the National Ballet School, Victoria, and took on other administrative positions before being made director of the Australian Ballet School from 1990 to 1998. In 1999 she was head-hunted to take over from Dame Merle Park as Director of the Royal Ballet School. She accepted the post with the proviso that her husband taught the boys at the school.

== Return to London ==
Gailene Stock moved to The Royal Ballet School in 1999, with her family. She immediately set to work changing the curriculum in order to make the student dancers more employment-ready upon graduation. When she joined, employment rates were around 48% and steadily rose to over 98% during her tenure.

She opened the doors to students from all over the world, which angered many of the establishment within the English ballet. Over her 15 years, she oversaw the refurbishments of the school's junior and senior sections, achieving a move of the Royal Ballet School's senior section from dowdy Chiswick premises to an award-winning conversion next to the Royal Opera House in Covent Garden, and upgrading the younger section's accommodation in White Lodge, Richmond Park.

She served twice as the president of the jury at the Prix de Lausanne (2003 and 2011) and also as a jury member for the Young America Grand Prix.

== Family ==
Gailene married fellow Australian and principal dancer Gary Norman while they were touring North America in 1977. Their daughter Lisa was born in 1978.

== Honours ==
In 1997, she was appointed a Member of the Order of Australia (AM) for services to ballet. In the Queen's Birthday Honours List of 5 June 2013, Stock was made a Commander of the Order of the British Empire (CBE). The insignia was brought to her hospital bed, where she was being treated for cancer.

== Awards ==
In 1998, Stock became the first Australian representative on the Executive and Artistic Committees of the Royal Academy of Dance, London. In 2013, she received the Governors of The Royal Ballet Gold Medal.

== Health and death ==
In 2013 Stock was diagnosed with a brain tumour and took leave from The Royal Ballet to receive treatment. She died a year later on 29 April 2014, aged 68.

Upon hearing of her death, David McAllister, artistic director of The Australian Ballet, paid tribute to her. "She was a passionate, intelligent and dynamic dancer whose career saw her dance across the globe. Rising from one of the youngest dancers in the company to the rank of ballerina, she danced in all the major classical repertoire (and was) a part of the many important new creations during her time with the company."

McAllister added, "Her success continued after leaving the stage, as a teacher of note and an innovative ballet school director, notably at both the Australian Ballet School and more recently the Royal Ballet School. Her legacy lives on in the thousands of dancers whose careers she touched and nurtured during these prestigious positions."
