= Ronald Hynd =

English choreographer

Ronald Hynd OBE (born 22 April 1931) is an English choreographer and former ballet dancer.

In the Royal Ballet in the late 1940s he began to dance with Annette Page, whom he later married. Page died on 4 December 2017. They have a daughter, Louise.

Ballets Hynd has choreographed include The Merry Widow in 1975, and the ballet Charlotte Brontë for the Royal Ballet Touring Company in 1974. He recreated the nineteenth-century ballet Papillon in 1979 and created The Hunchback of Notre-Dame ballet in 1988, both for the Houston Ballet. His version of The Nutcracker, produced by the London Festival Ballet in 1976, added a love story to the traditional tale by giving the heroine an older sister who falls in love with Dr. Drosselmeyer's nephew against her parents' wishes. He also choreographed for companies such as American Ballet Theatre, Ballet West, and Tulsa Theatre Ballet.
