= Gielgud =

Gielgud (English: /ˈɡiːlɡʊd/ GHEEL-guud) or Giełgud (Polish: [ˈɡʲɛwɡut]) is a Polish surname, a Polonized form of Lithuanian surnames Gelgud, Gelgudas, Gelgauda, or Gelgaudas, associated with the noble family Gelgaudai of the Grand Duchy of Lithuania and Polish-Lithuanian Commonwealth. Notable people with the surname include:

- Adam Giełgud (1832–1920), Polish-English writer and politician
- Antoni Giełgud (1792–1831), Polish-Lithuanian brigadier general
- John Gielgud (1904–2000), English actor, director and producer
- Lewis Gielgud (1894–1953), English scholar and intelligence officer
- Maina Gielgud (born 1945), English ballet dancer and ballet administrator
- Val Gielgud (1900–1981), English actor, writer, director and broadcaster

== See also ==
- Gielgud Theatre, London
- Gielgud Award
- 39557 Gielgud, an asteroid
