= Teodor Axentowicz =

Polish artist (1859–1938)

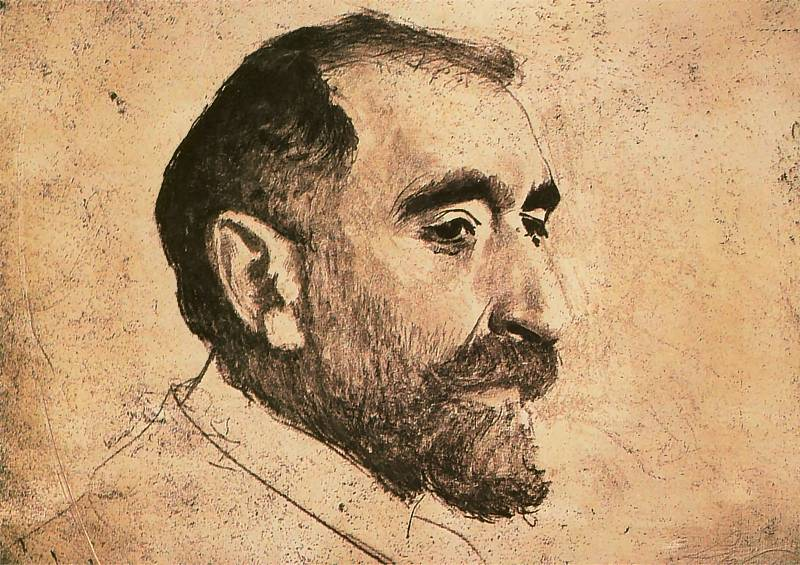
- Portrait by Leon Wyczółkowski, c. 1907
- Born: 13 May 1859; Brassó, Kingdom of Hungary, Austrian Empire
- Died: 26 August 1938 (aged 79); Kraków, Second Polish Republic
- Education: Academy of Fine Arts, Munich
- Known for: Painting
- Spouse: Iza Henrietta Gielgud (m. 1893)
- Relatives: Adam Giełgud (father-in-law); John Gielgud (acquired nephew); Lewis Gielgud (acquired nephew); Val Gielgud (acquired nephew)

Teodor Axentowicz (Armenian: Թեոդոր Աքսենտովիչ, romanized: Tʻeodor Akʻsentovichʻ; 13 May 1859 – 26 August 1938) was a Polish-Armenian painter and university professor. He was also the rector of the Academy of Fine Arts in Kraków. As an artist, Axentowicz was famous for his portraits and scenes of Hutsul life, set in the Carpathians.

== Life ==
Axentowicz was born on 13 May 1859 in Brassó, Hungary (now Brașov, Romania), to a family of Polish-Armenian ancestry. In 1893 in Chelsea, London, he married Iza Henrietta Gielgud, daughter of politician Adam Giełgud as well as aunt of Val and John Gielgud of the theatrical dynasty and their brother Lewis. A son, Philip S.A.D. Axentowicz, was born in Chelsea in 1893.

Between 1879 and 1882 he studied at the Academy of Fine Arts in Munich. From there he moved to Paris, where he was a student of Carolus-Duran and continued his education until 1895. During that time he started a long cooperation with various journals and started his career as a copyist, duplicating the works of Titian and Botticelli for Le Monde illustré. He also made numerous travels to London and Rome, where he prepared a set of portraits, one of the first in his career.

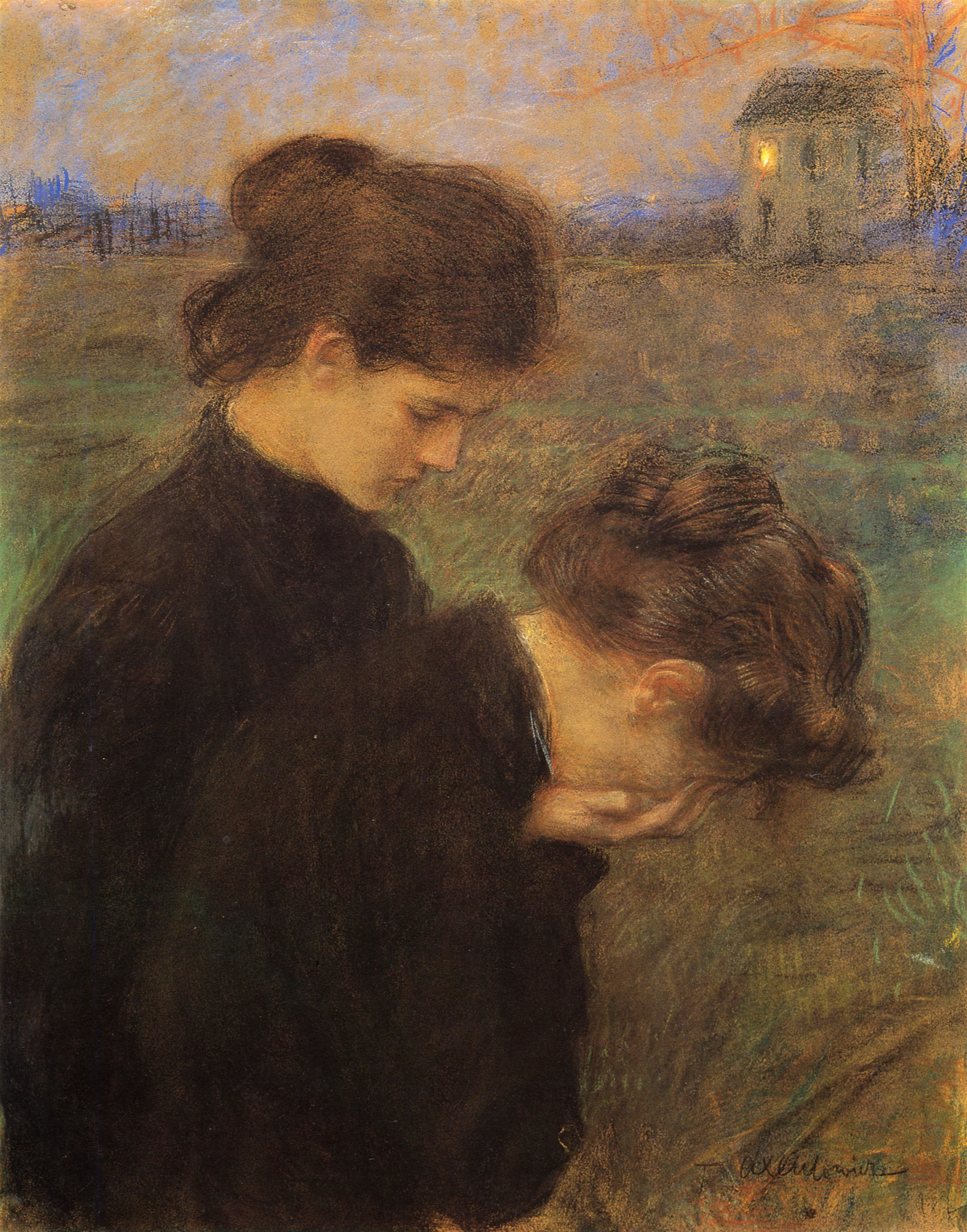
Under the burden of misery, Lviv National Art Gallery

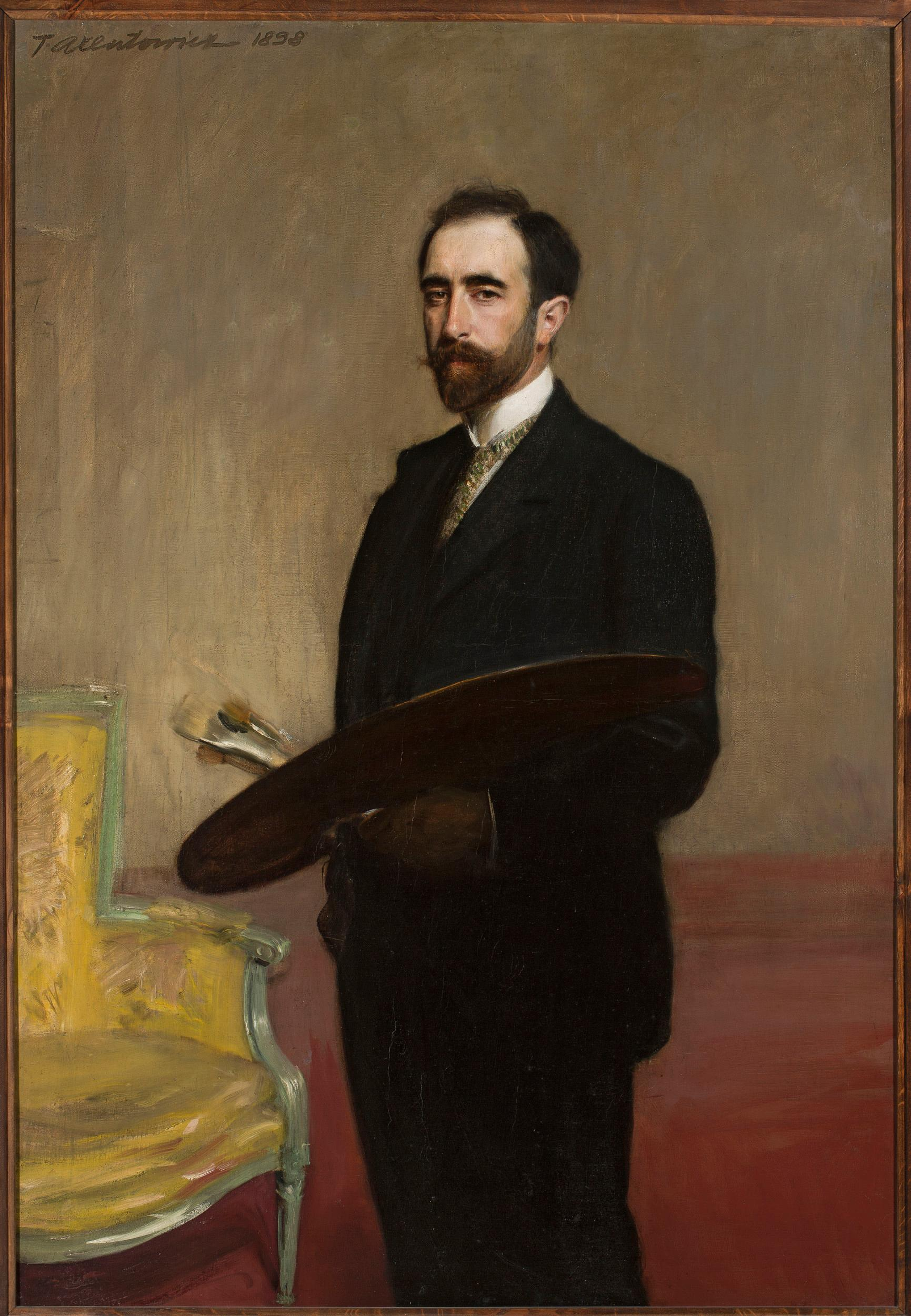
Self-portrait (1898, National Museum, Warsaw)

In 1894 he started collaboration with Wojciech Kossak and Jan Styka during the preparation of the Racławice Panorama, one of the largest panoramic paintings in the history of Polish art. The following year he moved to Kraków, where he became a professor at the local Academy of Fine Arts. He was also active in the local society and cooperated with various societies devoted to propagation of arts and crafts. In 1897 he founded an artistic conservatory for women and soon afterwards became one of the founders of the Sztuka society, whose members were such artists as Józef Chełmoński, Julian Fałat, Jacek Malczewski, Józef Mehoffer, Jan Stanisławski, Włodzimierz Tetmajer, Leon Wyczółkowski and Stanisław Wyspiański. In 1910 he became the rector of the academy and since 1928 was also an honorary member of the Zachęta Society. He died on 26 August 1938 in Kraków.

Throughout his life he had numerous exhibitions, both in Poland and abroad. He was awarded many gold medals at both national and international exhibitions, including those in Berlin (1896, 1913), St. Louis (1904), Munich (1905, 1935), London (1906), Vienna (1908), Rome (1911), Venice (1914, 1926), Paris (1921), Chicago (1927), and Prague (1927). His paintings can be found in almost all public collections in Poland and in numerous private ones there and abroad.

In 1904 at the St. Louis World's Fair, Axentowicz received a Special Commemorative Award in recognition of service in connection with various national sections of the Department of Art.

While in Paris, he received the title of Officier d'Académie Ordre des Palmes académiques and Member of Académie des Beaux-Arts.

In addition to Society of Polish Artists "Sztuka", he was also a member of Hagenbund and a founding member of the Vienna Secession.

== Awards ==
- 1909, knighted by Franz Joseph I of Austria to Order of the Iron Crown (Austria).
- 1923, the Commander's Cross with Star of the Order of Merit of the Republic of Poland.
- 1929, Medal of the Decade by the Second Polish Republic.
- 1929, the Grand Gold Medal at the Universal Exhibition in Poznań.
- 1936, Order of Polonia Restituta.

== See also ==
- List of Poles (visual arts)
