= Adam Giełgud =

Polish-British writer and politician (1832–1920)

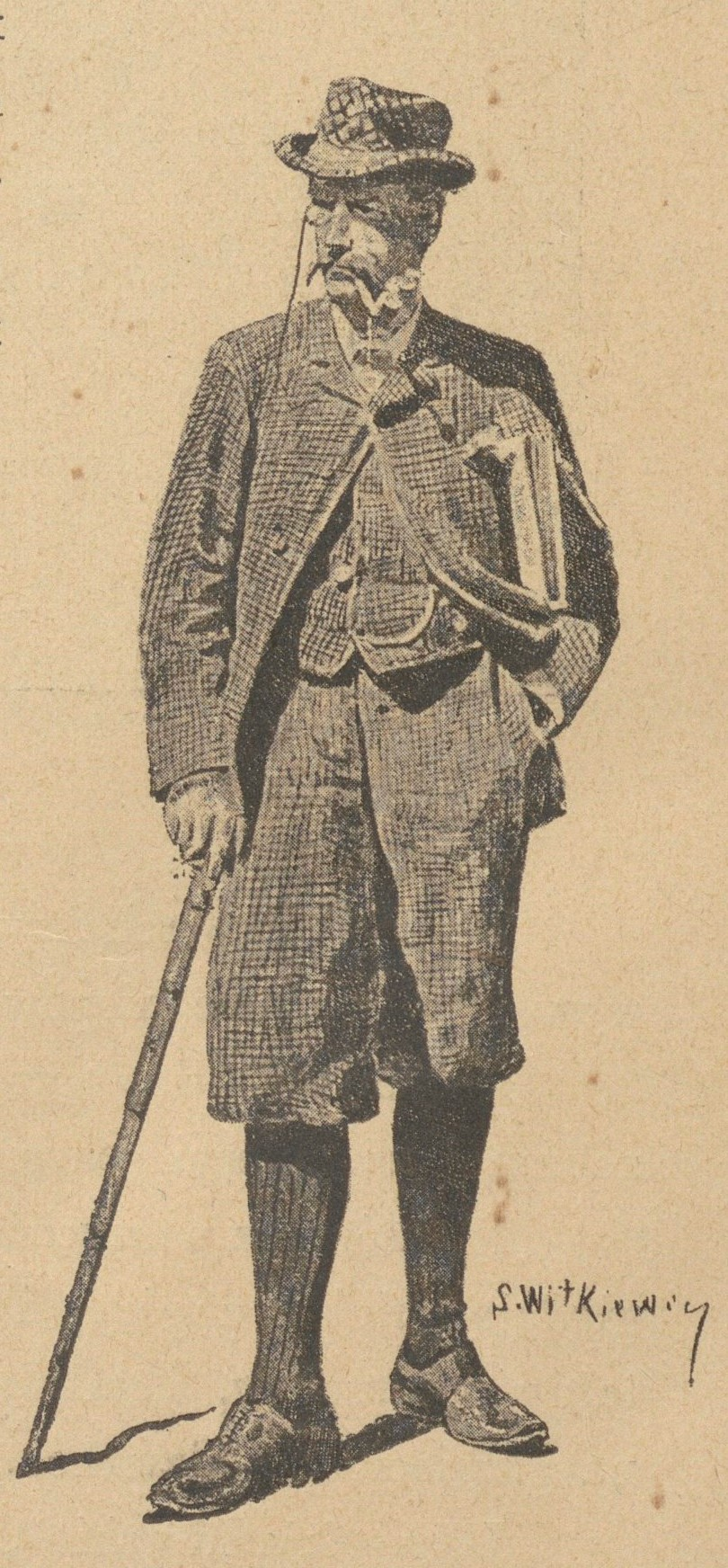
- Adam Giełgud, drawn by Stanisław Witkiewicz
- Born: Adam Jerzy Konstanty Giełgud; December 24, 1834; Königsberg, Prussia
- Died: November 26, 1920 (aged 85); Vevey, Switzerland
- Occupations: Writer; politician
- Relatives: See below

Adam Jerzy Konstanty Giełgud (24 December 1832 - 26 November 1920) was a Polish-British writer and politician. He was a grandfather of famous Shakespearean actor John Gielgud, among other relatives.

== Biography ==
His parents were Jan Giełgud, landowner in Samogitia, and Kunegunda Szemiot. Jan Giełgud fought in the anti-Russian uprisings of 1812 and 1831. After the 1831 uprising, they had to settle in Prussia, where Adam Giełgud was born in Königsberg. Soon the Prussian government forced them to leave the country, so they went to England. The parents were active in Polish emigration organizations, the father in the "Ogół" and historical society, while the mother chaired the Society of Polish Ladies.

Adam Giełgud graduated in law from the University of London. He accepted British citizenship in 1856 and started working for the War Office the same year. After a few years, he was promoted to head the Warrant Department.

He was involved in Polish emigration affairs. In the years 1860–64, he worked in the London Agency of the Hotel Lambert as a translator. During the January Uprising (1863–64), he translated reports of the Polish press for the British press. He wrote for the British press ("Pall Mall Gazette", "Westminster Review", "St. James Gazette" and others) texts about Central and Eastern European affairs. In the "Annual Register" he was responsible for sections on Russia, Germany, Austria-Hungary and the Balkans.

Adam Gielgud also had artistic inclinations. He wrote and acted in a three-act play, The Three Old Bachelors, staged by his family during the Christmas holidays.

In 1887 he went to Krakow. From then on he spent summers every year in Kraków, Zakopane and the Polish Tatra Mountains, which he promoted in London. In 1899 he retired and settled permanently in Kraków. In 1914 the authorities ordered him to go to Vienna and then to Vevey in Switzerland. There he became involved in the activities of the Swiss General Committee for Aid to War Victims in Poland. He was active as a journalist, in which he promoted Poland's right to independence and extensive borders. He died on 26 November 1920.

== Marriage and children ==
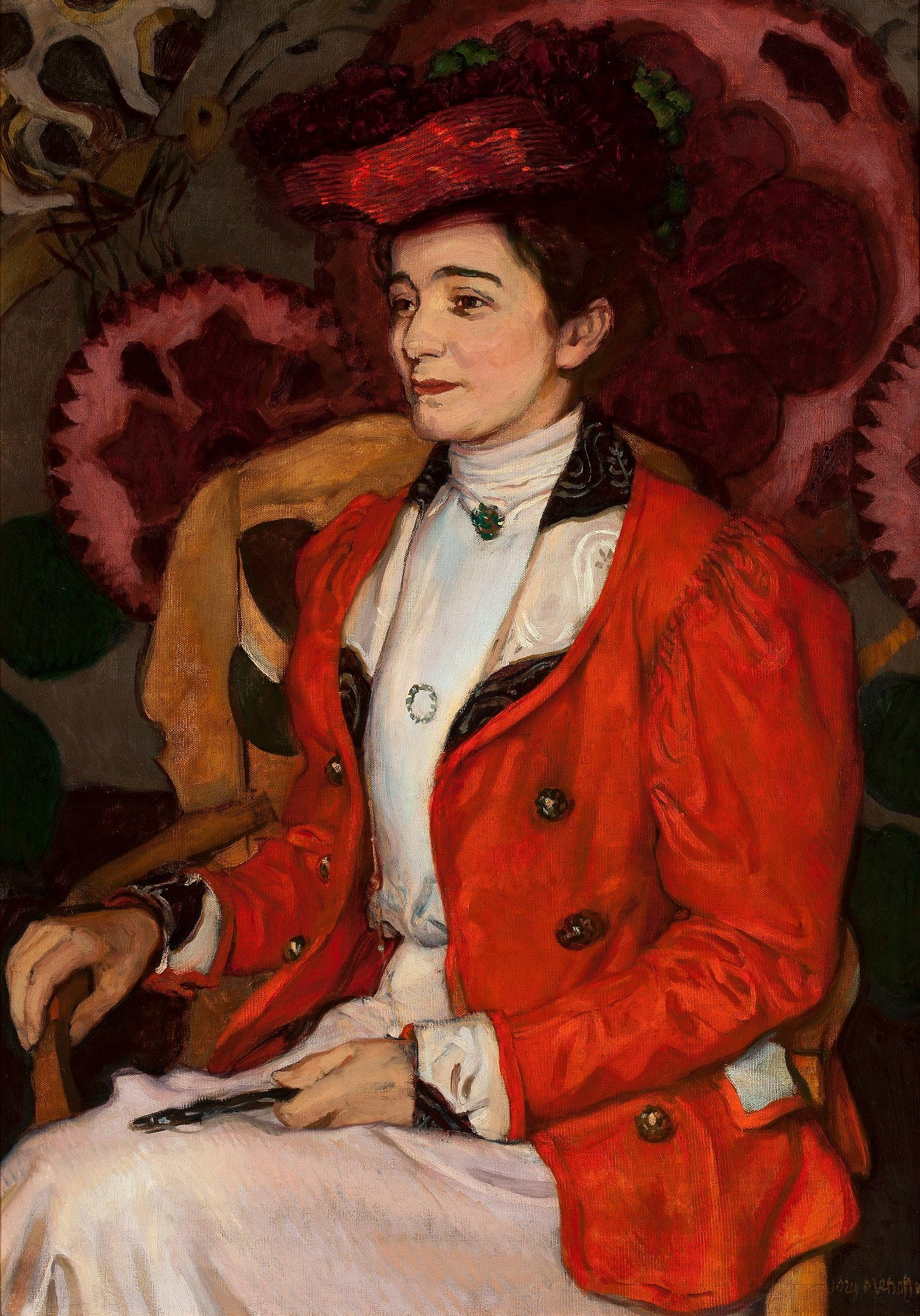
Portrait of Iza Axentowicz née Giełgud, painted by Józef Mehoffer (1907)

Around 1860, he married Leontyna Aniela Aszperger, a graduate of the Institute for Ladies at the Hotel Lambert in Paris, daughter of the Lwów actor couple Wojciech Aszperger and his wife Aniela Aszpergerowa (née Kamińska). They had four children:

- Franciszek "Frank" Gielgud (1860–1949), married Ewelina Welford, and after her death Kate Terry-Lewis, daughter of wealthy haberdasher and silk merchant Arthur James Lewis and actress Kate Terry; their sons were John Gielgud, famous British actor, Lewis Gielgud, British intelligence officer, and Val Gielgud, actor and broadcaster;
- Józef (Joseph) "Hal Lex" Gielgud (1867–1900);
- Włodzimierz "Val" Gielgud (1869–1916), married Violet Harris;
- Iza Henrietta Gielgud (1875–1957), married Polish painter Teodor Axentowicz.

== List of selected publications ==
In Polish:

- Wychodźcy nasi w Anglii (English: Our emigrants in England)

Translations:

- Adam Jerzy Czartoryski, Memoirs of Prince Adam Czartoryski and his correspondence with Alexander I. With documents relative to the prince's negotiations with Pitt, Fox, and Brougham, and an account of his conversations with Lord Palmerston and other English statesmen in London in 1832, London 1888.

== Sources ==
- Croall, Jonathan (2011). John Gielgud – Matinee Idol to Movie Star. London: Methuen. ISBN 1408131064.
- Kieniewicz, Stefan (1958). "Adam Jerzy Konstanty Giełgud". Polski Słownik Biograficzny (in Polish). Vol. 7. Wrocław. pp. 437–438. Archived from the original on 2022-05-22.
