= Maina Gielgud =

British ballet dancer (born 1945)

Maina Gielgud AO
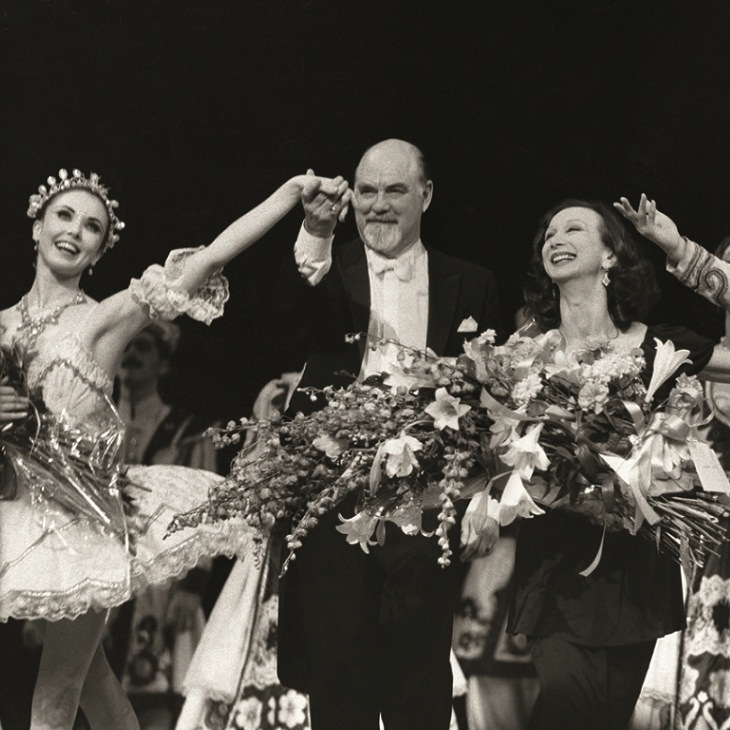
- Christine Walsh, John Lanchbery, and Maina Gielgud, in 1988
- Born: 14 January 1945 (age 81); London, England
- Occupation: Ballet dancer
- Parents: Lewis Gielgud (father); Zita Gordon (mother)
- Relatives: John Gielgud (uncle); Val Gielgud (uncle); Adam Giełgud (great-grandfather); Kate Terry (great-grandmother)

Maina Gielgud AO (born 14 January 1945) is a British former ballet dancer and a veteran ballet administrator. She was artistic director of The Australian Ballet from 1983 to 1996. She had a twenty-year career as a dancer in Europe and the United Kingdom. Gielgud directed the Royal Danish Ballet between 1997 and 1999. Until 2005, she held the artistic associate position at the Houston Ballet. She is a daughter of Lewis Gielgud and actress Zita Gordon and niece of actor Sir John Gielgud.

== Early and personal life ==
Maina Gielgud began dancing when she was six years old while living with her family in Brussels, Belgium. Her teacher at that time was Nadine Nicolaeva-Legat, the wife of renowned ballet dancer Nikolai Legat who taught her Swan Lake at the time. During her childhood she was inspired by such ballet greats as Maya Plisetskaya, Nina Vyroubova, Rosella Hightower and Galina Ulanova. Her favourite authors are Lewis Carroll, Marcel Proust, Iris Murdoch, Charles Dickens and former Prime Minister of the United Kingdom Winston Churchill. When it comes to choreographers, she likes Christopher Wheeldon, Alexei Ratmansky and Wayne McGregor while her favourite directors are Brook and Hall. She also enjoys listening to Maria Callas and watch acting done by Maggie Smith, Glenda Jackson, Judi Dench, Alec Guinness, Colin Firth, Ben Kingsley, John Hurt, Peter O'Toole and her uncle John. The movies that she is fascinated by are: Amour, Slumdog Millionaire, Quartet and The Bridge on the River Kwai.

== Career ==
From 1952 to 1955, Gielgud trained in London and Paris with such artists as George Gontcharov, Olga Preobrajenska, Tamara Karsavina, Lydia Kyasht, Nadine Nicolaeva-Legat, Stanislas Idzikovski and Rachel Cameron. From 1956 to 1961, Gielgud trained in Cannes, Monte Carlo and Paris with such artists as Julie Sedova, Lubov Egorova, Victor Gsovski, Mischa Reznikov, Paul Goubé, Rosella Hightower and Marika Besobrasova. From 1961 to 1962 she danced in the corps de ballet of the Ballet de Roland Petit. In 1962 she was a member of the corps de ballet of the Grand Ballet du Marquis de Cuevas before dancing as a soloist in 1962 with the Ballet de l'Etoile de Milorad Miskovitch. In 1963 she was a soloist for the Hommage au Marquis de Cuevas before joining the Grand Ballet Classique de France as Première Danseuse until 1967. Until 1971 she was the principal artist at the Ballet du XXème Siècle Maurice Béjart. For two years she was the principal artist at the Staatsoper Ballet Berlin. She then joined the London Festival Ballet until 1976. She became a principal artist with the Sadlers Wells Royal Ballet until 1978. In the years 1975-1981 she was the guest artist with the following companies:

- Ballet de l'Opéra de Marseille
- Grand Ballet Théâtre de Nancy
- Ballet du XXème Siècle Maurice Béjart
- The Australian Ballet
- Sadlers Wells Royal Ballet
- Scottish Ballet
- CAPAB (since renamed the Cape Town City Ballet Company)
- PACT Ballet, Johannesburg
- Hungarian National Ballet
- Bucarest Opera
- Ballet Nacional de Cuba

Gielgud joined London Festival Ballet as a Principal Artist in 1972. During her four years there her repertoire included Swan Lake, Giselle, The Sleeping Beauty, Don Quixote, The Nutcracker and Le Baiser de la Fée, which was created for her. In 1976 she joined The Royal Ballet's touring company, now Birmingham Royal Ballet, as a guest artist before joining as a Principal Artist in 1977. With this Company her roles included the Black Queen in Checkmate, the Siren in The Prodigal Son, Swanilda in Coppélia and the Gypsy Girl in The Two Pigeons.

From 1977 Gielgud's career as a freelance dancer took her to Hungary, France, Germany, America, Belgium and Australia. She continued to dance until 1981 when she retired from dancing and became Rehearsal Director of London City Ballet.

In 1983, she was appointed Artistic Director of The Australian Ballet. During her 14 years there she introduced over 40 classical and modern works to the company's repertoire. Her very first ballet that was staged with The Australian Ballet was Spartacus in which Martyn Fleming played the lead role. She considered John Lanchbery to be 'the finest conductor for dance of his generation and probably well beyond".

On 8 February 1991 she was appointed an Honorary Officer of the Order of Australia in recognition of her contribution to the performing arts, and particularly ballet. She has also been the recipient of an Advance Australia award.

From 1997 to 1999 Gielgud was Artistic Director of The Royal Danish Ballet, where she brought many new works to the company. Since 1999, Gielgud has been freelance and has taught, coached and staged works for several different companies including English National Ballet, Bejart Ballet Lausanne, Tokyo Ballet, Boston Ballet, and Ballet du Rhin.

In 2002, despite a hip surgery, she managed to stage a play Happy Days by Samuel Beckett in which she and Martyn Fleming played husband and wife. The same year, she also worked on a new production of Giselle and was hoping for commission to approve hers' Benjamin Britten's opera, Peter Grimes.

In 2003, Maina Gielgud was hired by Stanton Welch, an artistic director of Houston Ballet. After her two years of performance in such plays as Songs of a Wayfarer, Suite en Blanc, and Giselle, she resigned. She later told the Houston Chronicle that she and Welch had disagreements over her position. The final straw that led her to resign the post, was when Welch cancelled her upcoming performance of Giselle.

In August 2008 she performed her farewell to dancing in The Exquisite Hour at the Theatre Royal in Sydney, Australia. This piece was reworked extensively by Maurice Béjart, specifically for Gielgud.

In 2012, Gielgud staged Rudolf Nureyev's Don Quixote for Boston Ballet, and the same year did Maurice Béjart's Song of a Wayfarer for the National Ballet of Canada. In January 2013 she staged Serge Lifar's Suite en Blanc for San Francisco Ballet and in May of the same year revived Erik Bruhn's La Sylphide for the Rome Opera Ballet.

Since 2018, she is an International Master Teacher at the Youth America Grand Prix.

In 2019, Gielgud staged a ballet Sleeping Beauty, Aurora's Wedding which was produced by the Ballet Academy East. In that ballet, she choreographed Bianca Carnovale to play lead role.

== See also ==
- Terry family
