= Crock of Gold (1941 TV film) =

- Written by: Henry C. James; Michael Barry
- Directed by: Michael Barry
- Country of origin: United Kingdom
- Original language: English

Production
- Production company: BBC

Original release
- Network: BBC
- Release: 19 February 1948

Crock of Gold is a 1948 British television play. It was an early television depiction of Australia.

Michael Barry worked on the script and directed. The story came from Henry C. James.

== Cast ==
- Christine Adrian as Daisy
- Allan Bixter as The pianist
- John Boxer as Mr Darlington
- Edward Byrne as Patrick Connor / A man
- Cyril Chamberlain as Mr Lewis / A man
- Joyce Chancellor as Bridget
- Ivan Craig as Lofty Saunders
- Richard Hurndall as Sam Jenkins
- Warren Jenkins as Jack Atherton
- W.A. Kelly as Father Kelly / A man with a barrow
- Charles Lamb as Ted
- Pegeen Mair as Cathleen Connor
- Laurence Naismith as Mr Thomson
- Fred O’Donovan as Dead Sweet Joe Connor
- Charles Rolfe as Arthur NewsteadHorace Sequeira as Will Trelawny
- Morris Sweden as Tom Jones
- Reg Varney as Harry Pickering
- Herbert C. Walton as Jim Escreet
- Marguerite Young as Emigrant
