= Party Manners =

1949 play

- Written by: Val Gielgud
- Original language: English
- Genre: Comedy

Premiere
- Date premiered: 22 August 1949
- Place premiered: Buxton Opera House, Buxton

Party Manners is a comedy play by the British writer Val Gielgud. A political farce it was described in one review as "domestic comedy touched-up with witticism some good, some feeble, about the Labour Party government".

It originally premiered at the Opera House, Buxton on 22 August 1949. It later transferred to the Princes Theatre in London's West End where it ran for 48 performances between 31 October and 9 December 1950. The West End cast included Raymond Lovell, Jill Esmond, Terence Alexander, Michael Hordern, George Merritt, Brown Derby and Diana Calderwood.

== Bibliography ==
- Wearing, J.P. The London Stage 1950-1959: A Calendar of Productions, Performers, and Personnel. Rowman & Littlefield, 2014.
