= Demyship =

Scholarship at Magdalen College, Oxford

A demyship (also "demy" for the recipient) is a form of scholarship or research affiliation at Magdalen College, Oxford.

The title of "demy" is held by undergraduates who have been awarded a scholarship at Magdalen and are members of the college foundation, and is equivalent to "postmaster" at Merton College (see below) and "scholar" at other Oxford colleges. Historical notable demies at Magdalen College include individuals such as Oscar Wilde and T. E. Lawrence.

Historically, the term is derived from demi-socii or half-fellows, being formerly entitled to half the allowance awarded to Fellows. For many years a demyship carried an emolument of £60 per year.

Today, the more senior title of "Senior Demy" describes an honorary research position given to individuals who hold professorial, post-doctoral or fellowship roles elsewhere at the University of Oxford or externally. These individuals are elected to a demyship by the governing body of Magdalen College, with the recipients demonstrating outstanding scholarly and research excellence.

"Demy" and "demies" are pronounced to rhyme with "deny" and "surmise", rather than "semi(s)". Whilst Magdalen is unique amongst Oxbridge colleges in using the term Demies, Merton College, Oxford is similarly unusual in designating their scholars "postmasters", with a Postmasters Hall in ancient times.

== Historical foundation ==
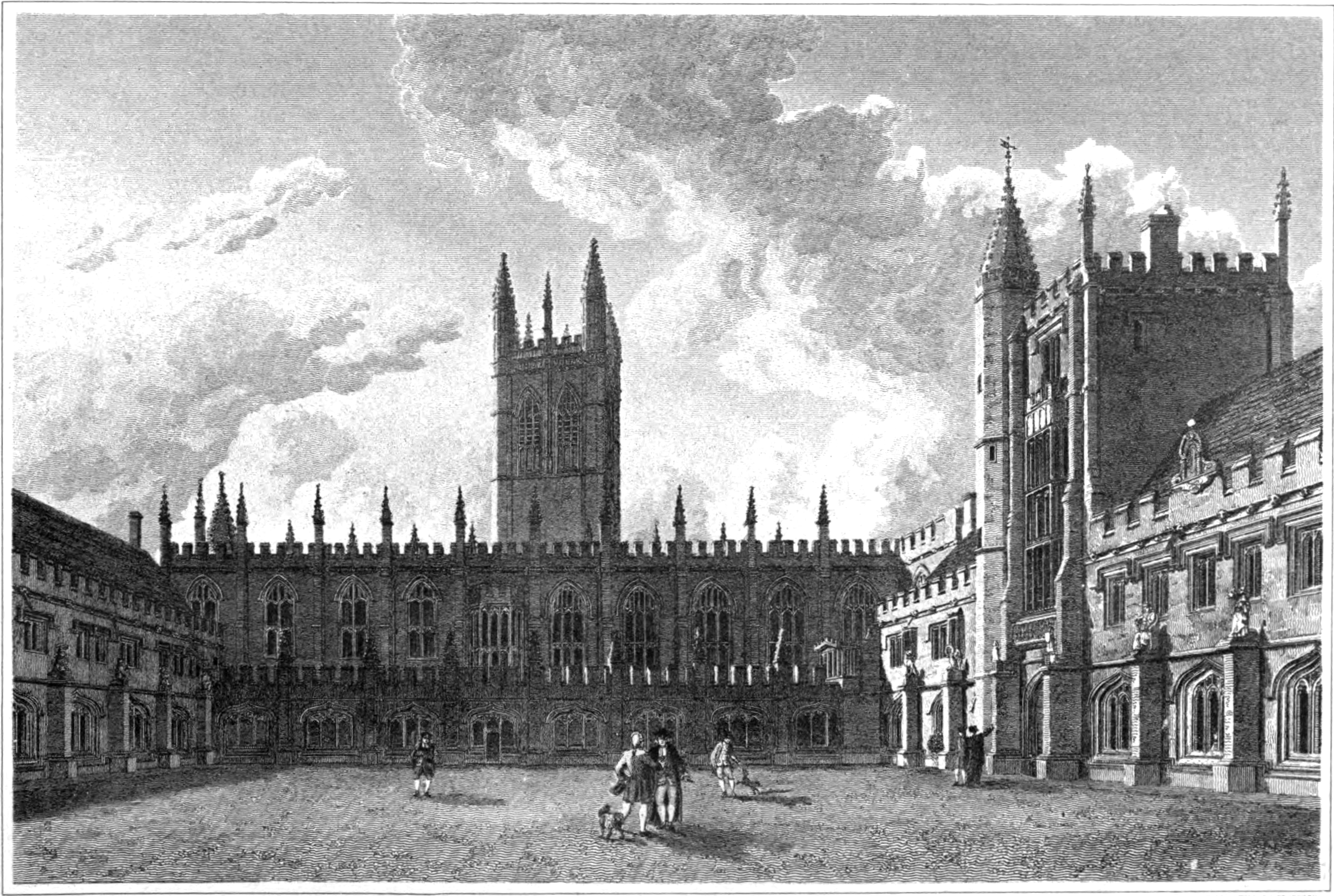
Historic view of Magdalen College

When Magdalen College was founded in 1458 by William of Waynflete, Bishop of Winchester, the Founder ordained that in addition to forty senior scholars, or Fellows, there should be 'thirty poor scholars, commonly called Demies, of good morals and dispositions fully equipped for study'. Recipients are still admitted to the College's Foundation. Whilst the original provision was for 30 scholars, in line with most colleges this number has increased to more than twice that in most years. Richard Mayew, President of the College from 1480 to 1507, added further statutes, resulting in many elections to fellowships and demyships at the College.

== Entitlement ==
Demies are entitled to attend various ceremonies and dinners. Most notably, all demies and scholars attend the annual Restoration Dinner on 25 October, held annually to commemorate the Restoration of the President and Fellows in 1688. Historically, demies and scholars also received a token sum of money, usually 10p, at the giving of Claymond's Dole each year, in a service to commemorate the gift to the College of former President John Claymond (1507–16).

== Admission ceremony ==
The ceremony for admission of new Demies is conducted in the President's lodgings or the College Chapel, immediately before the Restoration Dinner each year. All current Demies observe the ceremony; one by one, each Demy-elect kneels and the President says:

'Tu dabis fidem te statuta et ordinationes huius Collegii quatenus ad te spectant bene ac fideliter observaturum (observaturam) esse?'

(Will you faithfully and fully observe the statutes and regulations of this college in so far as they apply to you?)

The Demy-elect then says:

'Do fidem.'

(I swear)

The President then admits him or her to his or her Demyship with the words:

'Ego auctoritate Praesidis et sociorum admitto te scholarem in annos insequentes.'

(By the authority of the President and fellows I admit you as a scholar for the years to come)

The Demy then rises and shakes hands with the President and each current Demy, each of whom greets the new Demy with the traditional Magdalen words 'I wish you joy'.

== Notable demies ==
- Lord Denning
- Niall Ferguson
- Lewis Gielgud
- Chris Huhne
- T. E. Lawrence
- Peter Medawar
- George Osborne
- Kenneth Tynan
- Oscar Wilde

== See also ==
- Exhibition (scholarship)
- Scholarship — scholar
- Fellows at Oxford and Cambridge
