= Lewis Gielgud =

Lewis Evelyn Gielgud, MBE (11 June 1894 – 25 February 1953) was an English scholar, writer, intelligence officer and humanitarian worker.

== Life ==
=== Early years ===
Gielgud was born in South Kensington, London, first of the four children of Frank Henry Gielgud (1860–1949) and his second wife, Kate Terry-Gielgud, née Terry-Lewis (1868–1958). His younger siblings were Val, later head of BBC radio drama; John, who became a leading actor; and their sister Eleanor, who became John's secretary for many years. On his father's side, Gielgud was of Lithuanian and Polish descent. The surname derives from Gielgaudskis, a village in Lithuania. The Counts Gielgud had owned the Gielgudziszki Castle on the River Niemen, but their estates were confiscated after they took part in a failed uprising against Russian rule in 1830–31. Jan Gielgud took refuge in England with his family. Frank Gielgud was one of his grandchildren. Frank's maternal grandmother was a famous Polish actress, Aniela Aszpergerowa.

Frank Gielgud married into a family with wide theatrical connections. His wife was the daughter of the actress Kate Terry, and a member of the stage dynasty that included Ellen, Fred and Marion Terry, Mabel Terry-Lewis and Edith and Edward Gordon Craig. Frank had no theatrical ambitions and worked all his life as a stockbroker in the City of London. After attending Hillside preparatory school in Surrey, Gielgud went to Eton College as a King's Scholar and then studied at Magdalen College, Oxford, as an exhibitioner in 1912 and a classical demy in 1913.

=== Adult life ===
On the outbreak of the First World War he became an officer in the 6th Battalion, The King's Shropshire Light Infantry, but left active service after being wounded in 1915. He spent the rest of the war with the War Office (1916–17) and the British Military Mission in Paris (1917–19).

After the war Gielgud joined the staff of the International League of Red Cross Societies, rising to Under-Secretary General in 1927. In 1937 he married Zita Gordon; they had one child, a daughter Maina. He travelled far and wide for the organisation, organising international Red Cross conferences and giving lectures and broadcasts for them, but resigned from the organisation on the outbreak of the Second World War. He was given another army commission in 1940, serving in the War Office again and then being transferred to the Intelligence Corps (being promoted to his final rank of Lieutenant-Colonel in the latter in 1942). Released from the army in 1944, he returned to the Red Cross in 1945 as their sub-commissioner in Paris.

He was Co-ordinating Officer of the Inter Allied Reparation Agency in Brussels from 1946 to 1949, a counsellor of the OEEC from 1949 to 1951, and a senior official with UNESCO from 1951. In that year he and his wife divorced. He died in Paris shortly after an operation in 1953.

In addition to his international work, Gielgud wrote two novels, Red Soil and The Wise Child; a travel book, About It and About; and three plays in collaboration with Naomi Mitchison: The Price of Freedom, As It Was in the Beginning, and Full Fathom Five (1932). With his wife he wrote radio plays.

Shortly after Gielgud's death a colleague paid him this tribute:

There are some 50 nationalities represented on the staff of Unesco. Gielgud did much to remove those 50 barriers and make us feel at one. Unassumingly, but constructively, he served the cause of human unity in diversity and, himself not undistinguished in war, made a lasting contribution to peace.
