= Michael Barry (television producer) =

Michael Barry OBE (15 May 1910 – 27 June 1988) was a British television producer, director and executive, who was an important early influence on BBC television drama. He was educated at King's College London.

He was one of the first producers to work in the field of drama for the BBC, producing and directing several plays for the fledgling BBC Television Service in the 1930s, before it was placed on hiatus for the duration of the Second World War in 1939. He also worked occasionally outside of drama, producing episodes of the magazine programme Picture Page during 1938. After the resumption of the service in 1946, Barry returned, and quickly became one of the senior drama producers.

In 1952, he succeeded Val Gielgud to become the Head of Drama at BBC Television, a position he was to occupy for the next decade. He was responsible for commissioning several important productions, including the Quatermass science-fiction serials, and in 1954 an adaptation of George Orwell's Nineteen Eighty-Four. This latter production caused much controversy due to its supposed horrific scenes and subversive content, and Barry appeared on the current affairs programme Panorama the day after broadcast to defend the production, and three days later introduced the second performance live to camera himself.

Barry retired from his position of Head of Drama in 1961, being replaced the following year by his friend Sydney Newman, who oversaw major changes in the department. After a brief and unsuccessful spell in charge of RTÉ's new television service in Ireland, Barry returned for a time to front-line producing work, overseeing an epic series adaptations of William Shakespeare's The Wars of the Roses sequence of plays, before he retired altogether from television work.

The memoirs of his period in television, From the Palace to the Grove, were published by the Royal Television Society in 1992.

Media offices
Preceded by Val Gielgud	BBC Television Head of Drama; 1952–1961	Succeeded by Sydney Newman
