= Aniela Aszpergerowa =

Polish actress (1815–1902)

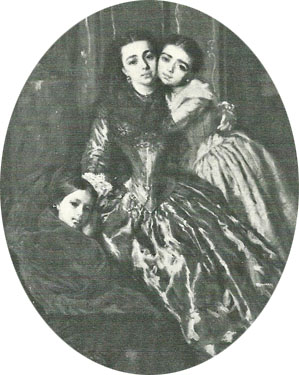
Aszpergerowa and her two daughters, ca. 1850

Leontyna Aniela Aszpergerowa (29 November 1815 – 28 January 1902), known professionally as Aniela Aszpergerowa, was a Polish stage actress who achieved wide fame in Poland and in the former Grand Duchy of Lithuania. She also took part in the January Uprising against Imperial Russia in 1863 and was sent to prison. Her great-grandson was John Gielgud.

== Career ==
Aszpergerowa was born in Warsaw, the daughter of Maria Wasińska and Stefan Kamiński from Bolimów. She began her career at the Warsaw Theatre Directorate in 1835 in the comedy Zazdrośni w miłości (Jealous in Love). A year later she appeared on stage in Vilnius. Then, she worked in Minsk, Lithuania, where she married the actor Wojciech Aszperger. About 1840, they moved to Warsaw and soon afterwards to Lviv, Galicia, where she achieved stardom. She became one of the most famous actresses of her time in Poland and in the former Grand Duchy of Lithuania, and was particularly associated with the theatre in Lviv, where she was active for more than half a century.

She appeared at the Skarbkowskiego Theatre during its grand opening (1842) in the part of Angeles in Maiden Vows by Aleksander Fredro. During its final presentation in the theater in 1900, she sat in one of the boxes as an honorary guest. After a few years in Lviv, Aszpergerowa separated from her husband, who returned to Warsaw. She was a versatile actor, who appeared at many theatres and on foreign stages, including in Berlin, Vienna and London. She was described as stylish, "graceful and elegant". Her repertoire included melodramatic roles as well as tragedy, comedy and contemporary plays. She played in the dramas of William Shakespeare (Ophelia in Hamlet; Mary Stuart; Lady Macbeth), Juliusz Słowacki (Balladyna), and Fredro (Angela; and Klara in Ślubach panieńskich). Her repertoire focused more on tragedies over the years, and she continued to act until 1896. The actress Helena Modrzejewska credited her as being an important mentor.

== Political activities ==
Aszpergerowa became involved in political work and the women's rights movement. She took part in the January Uprising against Imperial Russia in 1863; she was arrested in 1884 and sentenced to one year in prison for her support of Polish independence. After her release, she lived for a time in Kraków, and she returned there after her retirement.

== Family and death ==
Aszpergerowa was the great-grandmother of John Gielgud. He described her as "the greatest Shakespearean actress in all Lithuania". Her husband, Wojciech, was also a famous leading actor. They had two daughters, Waleria (Valerie) and Aniela Leontyna, the latter of whom married Adam Gielgud, who was born at sea during his parents' flight from Poland after the failed rising against Russian rule in 1830. Their son Frank married Kate Terry's daughter, Kate Terry-Lewis.

She died at the age of 86, and her funeral was attended by large crowds.

== See also ==
- List of Poles

== Sources ==
- Gielgud, John (1979). An Actor and His Time. London: Sidgwick and Jackson. ISBN 0283985739.
- Holmgren, Beth (2011). Starring Madame Modjeska: On Tour in Poland and America. Bloomington, Indiana: Indiana University Press. ISBN 978-0253005199.
- Morley, Sheridan (2001). John G – The Authorised Biography of John Gielgud. London: Hodder and Stoughton. ISBN 0340368039.
