= John Gielgud =

English actor and theatre director (1904–2000)

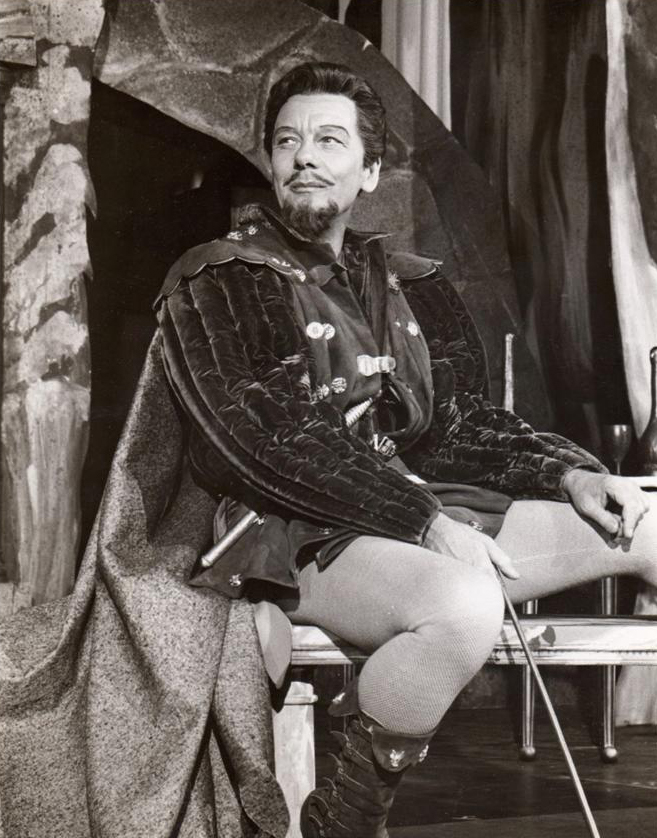
Gielgud in the role of Benedick in a 1959 production of Much Ado about Nothing

Sir Arthur John Gielgud (/ˈɡiːlɡʊd/ GHEEL-guud; 14 April 1904 – 21 May 2000) was an English actor and theatre director. With his contemporaries Laurence Olivier, Michael Redgrave and Ralph Richardson, he made up a quartet of male actors who dominated the British stage of the mid-20th century. A member of the Terry family theatrical dynasty, his career spanned eight decades. He gained his first paid acting work as a junior member of his cousin Phyllis Neilson-Terry's company in 1922. After studying at the Royal Academy of Dramatic Art (RADA), Gielgud worked in repertory theatre and in the West End before establishing himself at the Old Vic as an exponent of Shakespeare from 1929 to 1931.

During the 1930s Gielgud was a stage star in the West End and on Broadway, appearing in new works and classics. He began a parallel career as a director, and set up his own company at the Queen's Theatre, London. He was regarded by many as the finest Hamlet of his era, and was also known for high comedy roles such as John Worthing in The Importance of Being Earnest. In the 1950s Gielgud feared that his career was threatened when he was convicted and fined for a homosexual offence, but his colleagues and the public supported him loyally. When avant-garde plays began to supersede traditional West End productions in the later 1950s he found no new suitable stage roles, and for several years he was best known in the theatre for his one-man Shakespeare show The Ages of Man. From the late 1960s he found new plays that suited him, by authors including Alan Bennett, David Storey and Harold Pinter.

During the first half of his career Gielgud did not take the cinema seriously. Though he made his first film in 1924, and had successes with The Good Companions (1933) and Julius Caesar (1953), he did not begin a regular film career until his sixties. He appeared in more than sixty films between Becket (1964), for which he received his first Academy Award nomination for playing Louis VII of France, and Elizabeth (1998). As the acid-tongued Hobson in Arthur (1981) he won the Academy Award for Best Supporting Actor. His film work further earned him a Golden Globe Award and two BAFTAs.

Although largely indifferent to awards, Gielgud had the rare distinction of winning an Emmy, a Grammy, an Oscar, and a Tony (EGOT). He was famous from the start of his career for his voice and his mastery of Shakespearean verse. He broadcast more than a hundred radio and television dramas between 1929 and 1994, and made commercial recordings of many plays, including ten of Shakespeare's and three recordings from his own "Ages of Man". Among his honours, he was knighted in 1953 and the Gielgud Theatre was named after him in 1994. From 1977 to 1989, he was president of the Royal Academy of Dramatic Art.

== Life and career ==
=== Background and early years ===
Gielgud was born on 14 April 1904, in South Kensington, London, the third of the four children of Frank Henry Gielgud and his second wife, Kate Terry-Gielgud, née Terry-Lewis. Gielgud's elder brothers were Lewis, who became a senior official of the Red Cross and UNESCO, and Val, later head of BBC radio drama; his younger sister Eleanor became John's secretary for many years. On his father's side, Gielgud was of Lithuanian and Polish descent. The surname derives from Gelgaudiškis, a village in Lithuania. The Counts Gielgud had owned the Gelgaudiškis Manor on the Nemunas river, but their estates were confiscated after they took part in a failed uprising against Russian rule in 1830–31. (Note: The date is given by Gielgud as 1830, and by his biographer Jonathan Croall as 1831. The historian Saulius Sužiedėlis dates the uprising as November 1830 to November 1831.) Jan Gielgud took refuge in England with his family; one of his grandchildren was Frank Gielgud, whose maternal grandmother was the Polish actress Aniela Aszpergerowa.

Centre: Marion, Kate and Ellen Terry and, far right, Fred Terry at Ellen's Silver Jubilee matinée, Drury Lane, 12 June 1906. Everyone shown was a member of the Terry family.

Frank married into a family with wide theatrical connections. His wife, who was on the stage until she married, was the daughter of the actress Kate Terry, and a member of the stage dynasty that included Ellen, Fred and Marion Terry, Mabel Terry-Lewis and Edith and Edward Gordon Craig. Frank had no theatrical ambitions and worked all his life as a stockbroker in the City of London.

In 1912, aged eight, Gielgud went to Hillside preparatory school in Surrey as his elder brothers had done. For a child with no interest in sport he acquitted himself reasonably well in cricket and rugby for the school. In class, he hated mathematics, was fair at classics, and excelled at English and divinity. Hillside encouraged his interest in drama, and he played several leading roles in school productions, including Mark Antony in Julius Caesar and Shylock in The Merchant of Venice.

After Hillside, Lewis and Val had won scholarships to Eton and Rugby, respectively; lacking their academic achievement, John failed to secure such a scholarship. He was sent as a day boy to Westminster School (Note: He was briefly a boarder, but he persuaded his parents to let him live at home, which was only three miles (4.8 kilometres) from the school.) where, as he later said, he had access to the West End "in time to touch the fringe of the great century of the theatre". He saw Sarah Bernhardt act, Adeline Genée dance and Albert Chevalier, Vesta Tilley and Marie Lloyd perform in the music halls. The school choir sang in services at Westminster Abbey, which appealed to his fondness for ritual. He showed talent at sketching, and for a while thought of scenic design as a possible career.

The young Gielgud's father took him to concerts, which he liked, and galleries and museums, "which bored me rigid". Both parents were keen theatregoers, but did not encourage their children to follow an acting career. Val Gielgud recalled, "Our parents looked distinctly sideways at the Stage as a means of livelihood, and when John showed some talent for drawing his father spoke crisply of the advantages of an architect's office." On leaving Westminster in 1921, Gielgud persuaded his reluctant parents to let him take drama lessons on the understanding that if he was not self-supporting by the age of twenty-five he would seek an office post.

=== First acting experience ===
In 1921, the 17-year-old Gielgud joined a private drama school run by Constance Benson, wife of the actor-manager Sir Frank Benson. On the new boy's first day Lady Benson remarked on his physical awkwardness: "she said I walked like a cat with rickets. It dealt a severe blow to my conceit, which was a good thing." Before and after joining the school he played in several amateur productions, and in November 1921 made his debut with a professional company, though he himself was not paid. He played the Herald in Henry V at the Old Vic; he had one line to speak and, he recalled, spoke it badly. He was kept on for the rest of the season in walk-on parts in King Lear, Wat Tyler and Peer Gynt, with no lines.

If your great-aunt happens to be Ellen Terry, your great-uncle Fred Terry, your cousins Gordon Craig and Phyllis Neilson-Terry, and your grandmother the greatest Shakespearean actress in all Lithuania, you are hardly likely to drift into the fish trade.

— Gielgud on his theatrical background.

Gielgud's first substantial engagement came through his family. In 1922 his cousin Phyllis Neilson-Terry (Note: Phyllis Neilson-Terry was Gielgud's first cousin once removed, being a first cousin of his mother.) invited him to tour in J. B. Fagan's The Wheel as understudy, bit-part player and assistant stage manager, an invitation he accepted. A colleague, recognising that the young man had talent but lacked technique, recommended him to the Royal Academy of Dramatic Art (RADA). Gielgud was awarded a scholarship to the academy and trained there throughout 1923 under Kenneth Barnes, Helen Haye and Claude Rains.

The actor-manager Nigel Playfair, a friend of Gielgud's family, saw him in a student presentation of J. M. Barrie's The Admirable Crichton. Playfair was impressed and cast him as Felix, the poet-butterfly, in the British premiere of the Čapek brothers' The Insect Play. Gielgud later said that he made a poor impression in the part: "I am surprised that the audience did not throw things at me." The critics were cautious but not hostile to the play; it did not attract the public and closed after a month. While still continuing his studies at RADA, Gielgud appeared again for Playfair in Robert E Lee by John Drinkwater. After leaving the academy at the end of 1923 Gielgud played a Christmas season as Charley in Charley's Aunt in the West End, and then joined Fagan's repertory company at the Oxford Playhouse.

Gielgud was in the Oxford company in January and February 1924, from October 1924 to the end of January 1925, and in August 1925. He played a wide range of parts in classics and modern plays, greatly increasing his technical abilities in the process. The role he most enjoyed was Trofimov in The Cherry Orchard, his first experience of Chekhov: "It was the first time I ever went out on stage feeling that perhaps, after all, I could really be an actor."

=== Early West End roles ===
Between Gielgud's first two Oxford seasons, the producer Barry Jackson cast him as Romeo to the Juliet of Gwen Ffrangcon-Davies at the Regent's Theatre, London, in May 1924. The production was not a great success, but the two performers became close friends and frequently worked together throughout their careers. Gielgud made his screen debut during 1924 as Daniel Arnault in Walter Summers's silent film Who Is the Man? (1924).

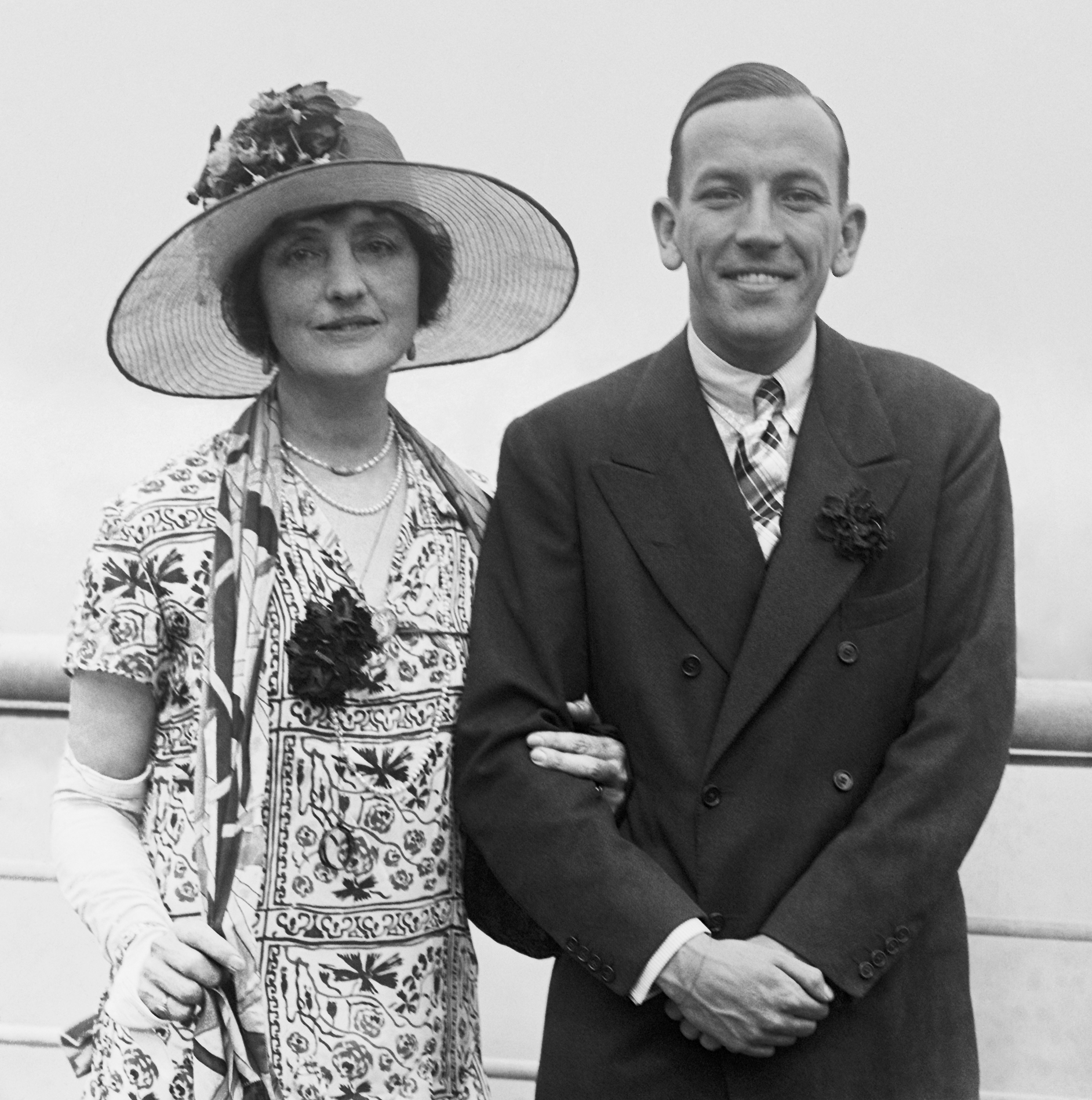
Noël Coward with Lilian Braithwaite, his, and later Gielgud's, co-star in The Vortex

In May 1925 the Oxford production of The Cherry Orchard was brought to the Lyric Theatre, Hammersmith. Gielgud again played Trofimov. His distinctive speaking voice attracted attention and led to work for BBC Radio, which his biographer Sheridan Morley calls "a medium he made his own for seventy years". In the same year Noël Coward chose Gielgud as his understudy in his play The Vortex. For the last month of the West End run Gielgud took over Coward's role of Nicky Lancaster, the drug-addicted son of a nymphomaniac mother. It was in Gielgud's words "a highly-strung, nervous, hysterical part which depended a lot upon emotion". He found it tiring to play because he had not yet learned how to pace himself, but he thought it "a thrilling engagement because it led to so many great things afterwards".

The success of The Cherry Orchard led to what one critic called a "Chekhov boom" in British theatres, and Gielgud was among its leading players. As Konstantin in The Seagull in October 1925 he impressed the Russian director Theodore Komisarjevsky, who cast him as Tusenbach in the British premiere of Three Sisters. The production received enthusiastic reviews, and Gielgud's highly praised performance enhanced his reputation as a potential star. There followed three years of mixed fortunes for him, with successes in fringe productions, but West End stardom was elusive.

In 1926 the producer Basil Dean offered Gielgud the lead role of Lewis Dodd in The Constant Nymph, a dramatisation of Margaret Kennedy's best-selling novel of the same name. Before rehearsals began Dean found that a bigger star than Gielgud was available, namely Coward, to whom he gave the part. Gielgud had an enforceable contractual claim to the role, but Dean, a notorious bully, was a powerful force in British theatre. Intimidated, Gielgud accepted the position of understudy, with a guarantee that he would take over the lead from Coward when the latter, who disliked playing in long runs, left. In the event Coward, who had been overworking, suffered a nervous collapse three weeks after the opening night, and Gielgud played the lead for the rest of the run. The play ran for nearly a year in London and then went on tour.

Mrs Patrick Campbell and Edith Evans, 1920s co-stars with Gielgud

By this time Gielgud was earning enough to leave the family home and take a small flat in the West End. He had his first serious romantic relationship, living with John Perry, an unsuccessful actor, later a writer, who remained a lifelong friend after their affair ended. Morley makes the point that, like Coward, Gielgud's principal passion was the stage; both men had casual dalliances, but were more comfortable with "low-maintenance" long-term partners who did not impede their theatrical work and ambitions.

In 1928 Gielgud made his Broadway debut as the Grand Duke Alexander in Alfred Neumann's The Patriot. The play was a failure, closing after a week, but Gielgud liked New York and received favourable reviews from critics including Alexander Woollcott and Brooks Atkinson. After returning to London he starred in a succession of short runs, including Ibsen's Ghosts with Mrs Patrick Campbell (1928), and Reginald Berkeley's The Lady with a Lamp (1929) with Edith Evans and Gwen Ffrangcon-Davies. In 1928 he made his second film, The Clue of the New Pin. (Note: According to Morley, but not to Gielgud or Croall, Gielgud's second film appearance was in the title role of Komisarjevsky's film Michael Strogoff (1926). No such film is listed by the British Film Institute, and this seems to refer to a live performance given as a prologue to the gala screening of Universal Film de France's 1926 Michel Strogoff at the Albert Hall. The film was directed by Viktor Tourjansky; Komisarjevsky directed the live prologue, in which a scene from the film was enacted "with prominent British stage players taking the principal roles and scores of dancing girls and others making up the colorful Tartar atmosphere".) This, billed as "the first British full-length talkie", was an adaptation of an Edgar Wallace mystery story; Gielgud played a young scoundrel who commits two murders and very nearly a third before he himself is killed. (Note: Both Gielgud and Morley refer to the film as silent, but according to the British Film Institute, it had sound, by the British Phototone sound-on-disc system, and beat Alfred Hitchcock's Blackmail to the distinction of being Britain's first full-length talkie.)

=== Old Vic ===
In 1929 Harcourt Williams, newly appointed as director of productions at the Old Vic, invited Gielgud to join the company for the forthcoming season. The Old Vic, in an unfashionable area of London south of the Thames, was run by Lilian Baylis to offer plays and operas to a mostly working-class audience at low ticket prices. She paid her performers very modest wages, but the theatre was known for its unrivalled repertory of classics, mostly Shakespeare, and Gielgud was not the first West End star to take a large pay cut to work there. It was, in Morley's words, the place to learn Shakespearean technique and try new ideas.

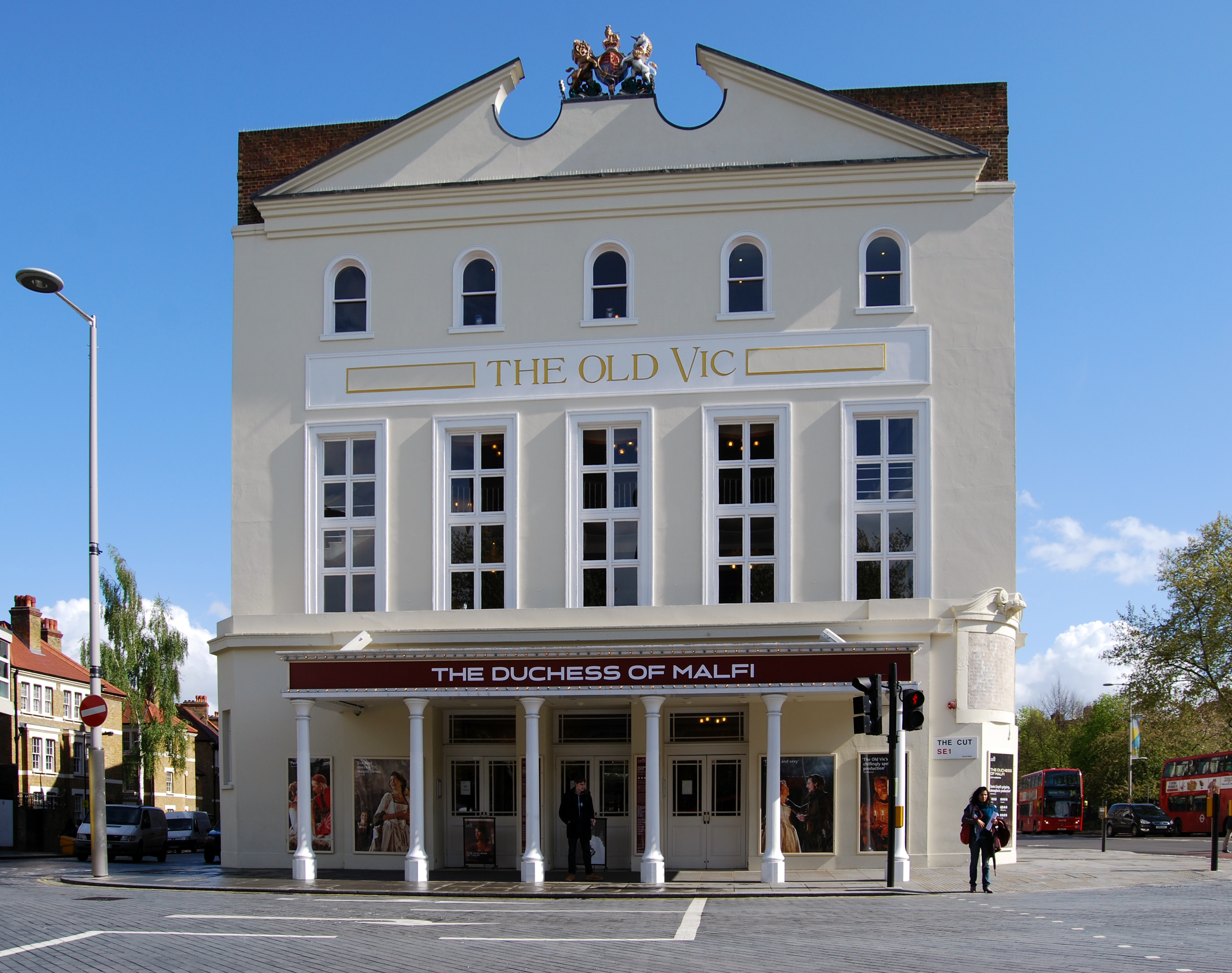
The Old Vic (photographed in 2012), where Gielgud honed his skill as a Shakespearean

During his first season at the Old Vic, Gielgud played Romeo to the Juliet of Adele Dixon, Antonio in The Merchant of Venice, Cleante in The Imaginary Invalid, the title role in Richard II, and Oberon in A Midsummer Night's Dream. His Romeo was not well reviewed, but as Richard II Gielgud was recognised by critics as a Shakespearean actor of undoubted authority. The reviewer in The Times commented on his sensitiveness, strength and firmness, and called his performance "work of genuine distinction, not only in its grasp of character, but in its control of language". Later in the season he was cast as Mark Antony in Julius Caesar, Orlando in As You Like It, the Emperor in Androcles and the Lion and the title role in Pirandello's The Man with the Flower in His Mouth.

In April 1930 Gielgud finished the season playing Hamlet. Williams's production used the complete text of the play. This was regarded as a radical innovation; extensive cuts had been customary for earlier productions. A running time of nearly five hours did not dampen the enthusiasm of the public, the critics or the acting profession. Sybil Thorndike said, "I never hoped to see Hamlet played as in one's dreams ... I've had an evening of being swept right off my feet into another life – far more real than the life I live in, and moved, moved beyond words." The production gained such a reputation that the Old Vic began to attract large numbers of West End theatregoers. Demand was so great that the cast moved to the Queen's Theatre, in Shaftesbury Avenue, where Williams staged the piece with the text discreetly shortened. The effect of the cuts was to give the title role even more prominence. Gielgud's Hamlet was richly praised by the critics. Ivor Brown called it "a tremendous performance ... the best Hamlet of [my] experience". James Agate wrote, "I have no hesitation whatsoever in saying that it is the high water-mark of English Shakespearean acting of our time."

Mabel Terry-Lewis, Gielgud's aunt and co-star in The Importance of Being Earnest

Hamlet was a role with which Gielgud was associated over the next decade and more. After the run at the Queen's finished he turned to another part for which he became well known, John Worthing in The Importance of Being Earnest. Gielgud's biographer Jonathan Croall comments that the two roles illustrated two sides of the actor's personality: on the one hand the romantic and soulful Hamlet, and on the other the witty and superficial Worthing. The formidable Lady Bracknell was played by his aunt, Mabel Terry-Lewis. The Times observed, "Mr Gielgud and Miss Terry-Lewis together are brilliant ... they have the supreme grace of always allowing Wilde to speak in his own voice."

Returning to the Old Vic for the 1930–31 season, Gielgud found several changes to the company. Donald Wolfit, who loathed him and was himself disliked by his colleagues, was dropped, as was Adele Dixon. Gielgud was uncertain of the suitability of the most prominent new recruit, Ralph Richardson, but Williams was sure that after this season Gielgud would move on; he saw Richardson as a potential replacement. The two actors had little in common. Richardson recalled, "He was a kind of brilliant butterfly, while I was a very gloomy sort of boy", and "I found his clothes extravagant, I found his conversation flippant. He was the New Young Man of his time and I didn't like him." The first production of the season was Henry IV, Part 1, in which Gielgud as Hotspur had the best of the reviews. Richardson's notices, and the relationship of the two leading men, improved markedly when Gielgud, who was playing Prospero in The Tempest, helped Richardson with his performance as Caliban:

He gave me about two hundred ideas, as he usually does, twenty-five of which I eagerly seized on, and when I went away I thought, "This chap, you know, I don't like him very much but by God he knows something about this here play." ... And then out of that we formed a friendship.

The friendship and professional association lasted for more than fifty years, until the end of Richardson's life. Gielgud's other roles in this season were Lord Trinket in The Jealous Wife, Richard II again, Antony in Antony and Cleopatra, Malvolio in Twelfth Night, Sergius in Arms and the Man, Benedick in Much Ado About Nothing – another role for which he became celebrated – and he concluded the season as King Lear. His performance divided opinion. The Times commented, "It is a mountain of a part, and at the end of the evening the peak remains unscaled"; in The Manchester Guardian, however, Brown wrote that Gielgud "is a match for the thunder, and at length takes the Dover road with a broken tranquillity that allowed every word of the King's agony to be clear as well as poignant".

=== West End star ===
Returning to the West End, Gielgud starred in J. B. Priestley's The Good Companions, adapted for the stage by the author and Edward Knoblock. (Note: Knoblock was the subject of one of the most repeated Gielgud stories, which, pressed by Emlyn Williams, Gielgud confessed was true. While Knoblock and Gielgud were dining one day at The Ivy a man passed their table, and Gielgud said, "Thank God he didn't stop, he's a bigger bore than Eddie Knoblock – oh, not you, Eddie!" Williams asked how Knoblock reacted, and Gielgud replied, "He just looked slightly puzzled, and went on boring.") The production ran from May 1931 for 331 performances, and Gielgud described it as his first real taste of commercial success. He played Inigo Jollifant, a young schoolmaster who abandons teaching to join a travelling theatre troupe. This crowd-pleaser drew disapproval from the more austere reviewers, who felt Gielgud should be doing something more demanding, but he found playing a conventional juvenile lead had challenges of its own and helped him improve his technique. During the run of the play he made another film, Insult (1932), a melodrama about the French Foreign Legion, and he starred in a cinema version of The Good Companions in 1933, with Jessie Matthews. (Note: In a retrospective survey of Gielgud's film career, Brian Baxter wrote in 2000 that Inigo was Gielgud's first memorable screen role, helped by the direction of Victor Saville, whom Baxter calls the best British director of the period next to Alfred Hitchcock. The film was well received by critics; Mordaunt Hall of The New York Times got Gielgud mixed up with his brother Val but thought his performance "a joy to behold ... extraordinarily real".) A letter to a friend reveals Gielgud's view of film acting: "There is talk of my doing Inigo in the film of The Good Companions, which appals my soul but appeals to my pocket." In his first volume of memoirs, published in 1939, Gielgud devoted two pages to describing the things about filming that he detested. Unlike his contemporaries Richardson and Laurence Olivier, he made few films until after the Second World War, and did not establish himself as a prominent film actor until many years after that. As he put it in 1994, "I was stupid enough to toss my head and stick to the stage while watching Larry and Ralph sign lucrative Korda contracts."

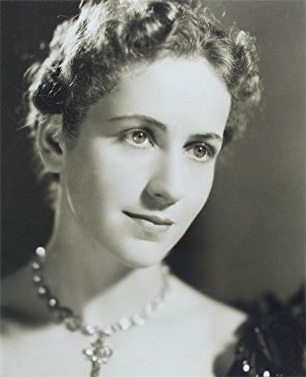
Peggy Ashcroft in 1936

In 1932 Gielgud turned to directing. At the invitation of George Devine, the president of the Oxford University Dramatic Society, Gielgud took charge of a production of Romeo and Juliet by the society, featuring two guest stars: Peggy Ashcroft as Juliet and Edith Evans as the Nurse. The rest of the cast were students, led by Christopher Hassall as Romeo, and included Devine, William Devlin and Terence Rattigan. The experience was satisfactory to Gielgud: he enjoyed the attentions of the undergraduates, had a brief affair with one of them, James Lees-Milne, and was widely praised for his inspiring direction and his protégés' success with the play. Already notorious for his innocent slips of the tongue (he called them "Gielgoofs"), in a speech after the final performance he referred to Ashcroft and Evans as "Two leading ladies, the like of whom I hope I shall never meet again".

During the rest of 1932 Gielgud played in a new piece, Musical Chairs by Ronald Mackenzie, and directed one new and one classic play, Strange Orchestra by Rodney Ackland in the West End, and The Merchant of Venice at the Old Vic, with Malcolm Keen as Shylock and Ashcroft as Portia. In 1932 he starred in Richard of Bordeaux by Elizabeth MacKintosh. (Note: MacKintosh wrote under the pen name Gordon Daviot, and wrote novels under the name Josephine Tey.) This, a retelling in modern language of the events of Richard II, was greeted as the most successful historical play since Shaw's Saint Joan nine years earlier, more faithful to the events than Shakespeare had been. After an uncertain start in the West End it rapidly became a sell-out hit and played in London and on tour over the next three years.

Between seasons of Richard, in 1934 Gielgud returned to Hamlet in London and on tour, directing and playing the title role. The production was a box-office success, and the critics were lavish in their praise. In The New York Times, Charles Morgan wrote, "I have never before heard the rhythm and verse and the naturalness of speech so gently combined. ... If I see a better performance of this play than this before I die, it will be a miracle." Morley writes that junior members of the cast such as Alec Guinness and Frith Banbury would gather in the wings every night "to watch what they seemed intuitively already to know was to be the Hamlet of their time".

Mr Olivier was about twenty times as much in love with Peggy Ashcroft as Mr Gielgud is. But Mr Gielgud spoke most of the poetry far better than Mr Olivier ... Yet – I must out with it – the fire of Mr Olivier's passion carried the play along as Mr Gielgud's doesn't quite.

— Herbert Farjeon on the rival Romeos.

The following year Gielgud staged perhaps his most famous Shakespeare production, a Romeo and Juliet in which he co-starred with Ashcroft and Olivier. Gielgud had spotted Olivier's potential and gave him a major step up in his career. (Note: Olivier's biographer Michael Billington writes under the heading "Rescued by Gielgud" that Olivier "had appeared in a string of commercial flops, had flirted unrewardingly with Hollywood, and had largely avoided the classics".) For the first weeks of the run Gielgud played Mercutio and Olivier played Romeo, after which they exchanged roles. (Note: The original casting applied from 18 October to 28 November 1935; the two leading men then switched roles for alternating periods of several weeks at a time during the run. For the last week, ending on 28 March 1936, Olivier was Mercutio and Gielgud Romeo.) As at Oxford, Ashcroft and Evans were Juliet and the nurse. The production broke all box-office records for the play, running at the New Theatre for 189 performances. (Note: The previous record was 161 performances, by Henry Irving and Gielgud's great-aunt Ellen Terry in 1882.) Olivier was enraged at the notices after the first night, which praised the virility of his performance but fiercely criticised his speaking of Shakespeare's verse, comparing it with his co-star's mastery of the poetry. The friendship between the two men was prickly, on Olivier's side, for the rest of his life.

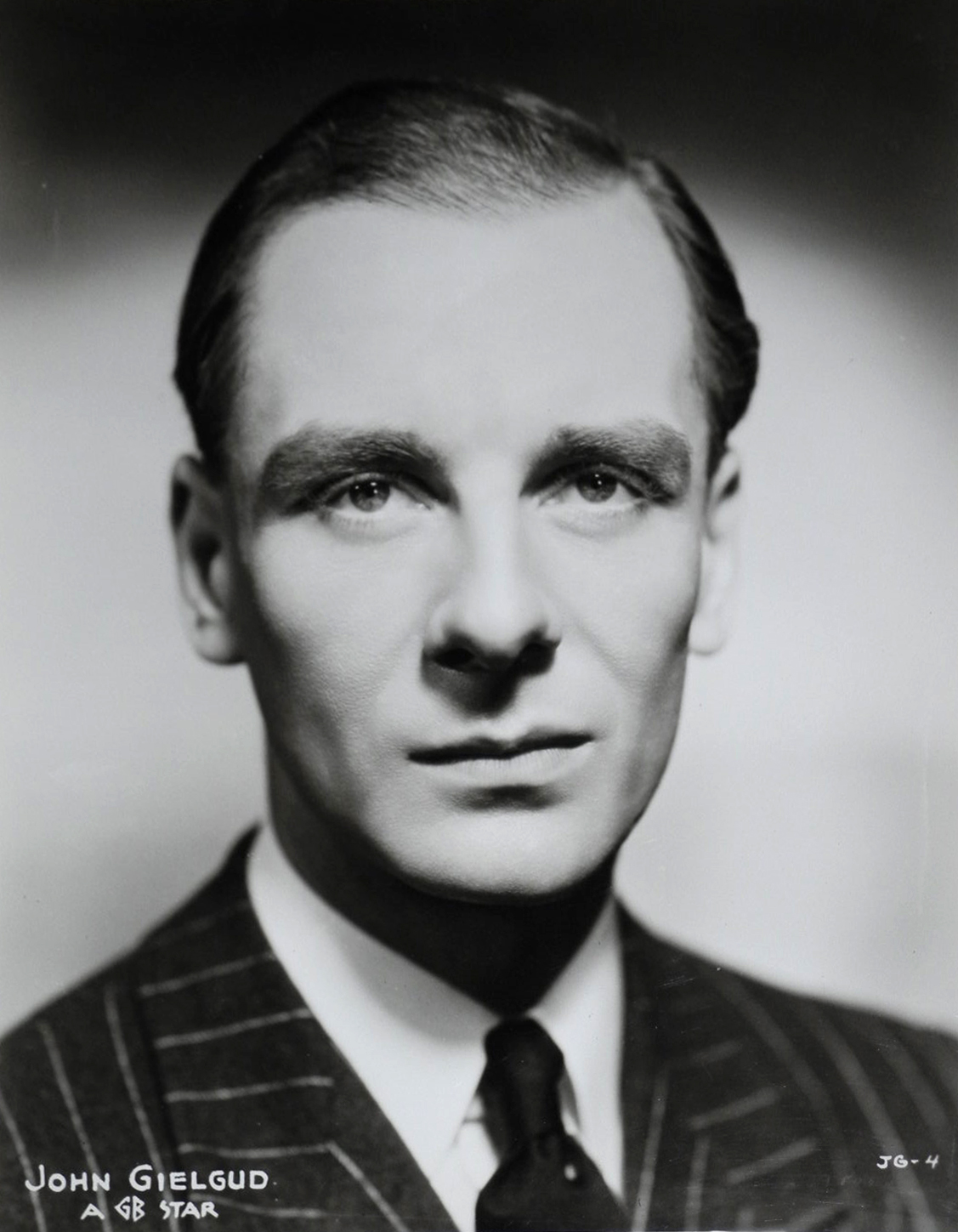
Gielgud in a publicity photograph for Secret Agent (1936)

In May 1936 Gielgud played Trigorin in The Seagull, with Evans as Arkadina and Ashcroft as Nina. Komisarjevsky directed, which made rehearsals difficult as Ashcroft, with whom he had been living, had just left him. Nonetheless, Morley writes, the critical reception was ecstatic. In the same year Gielgud made his last pre-war film, co-starring with Madeleine Carroll in Alfred Hitchcock's Secret Agent. The director's insensitivity to actors made Gielgud nervous and further increased his dislike of filming. The two stars were praised for their performances, but Hitchcock's "preoccupation with incident" was felt by critics to make the leading roles one-dimensional, and the laurels went to Peter Lorre as Gielgud's deranged assistant.

From September 1936 to February 1937 Gielgud played Hamlet in North America, opening in Toronto before moving to New York and Boston. He was nervous about starring on Broadway for the first time, particularly as it became known that the popular actor Leslie Howard was to appear there in a rival production of the play. When Gielgud opened at the Empire Theatre in October the reviews were mixed, (Note: Brooks Atkinson commented that Gielgud's performance "requires comparison with the best. But there is a coarser ferocity to Shakespeare's tragedy that is sound theatre, and that is wanting in Mr Gielgud's art.") but, as the actor wrote to his mother, the audience response was extraordinary. "They stay at the end and shout every night and the stage door is beset by fans." Howard's production opened in November; it was, in Gielgud's words, a débâcle, and the "battle of the Hamlets" heralded in the New York press was over almost as soon as it had begun. Howard's version closed within a month; the run of Gielgud's production beat Broadway records for the play.

=== Queen's Theatre company ===
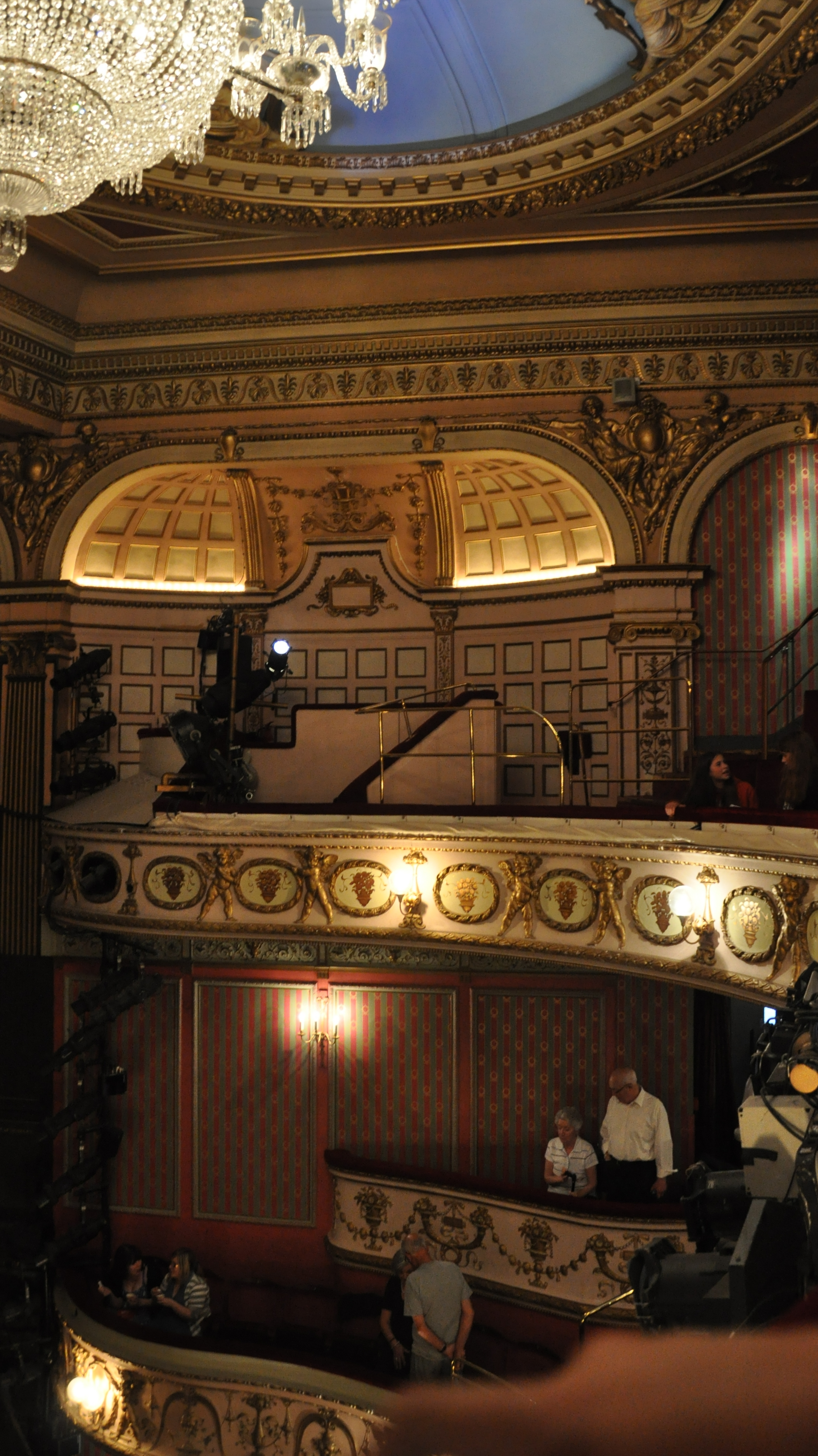
Interior of the Queen's Theatre

After his return from America in February 1937 Gielgud starred in He Was Born Gay by Emlyn Williams. This romantic tragedy about French royalty after the Revolution was quite well received during its pre-London tour, but was savaged by the critics in the West End. The Times said, "This is one of those occasions on which criticism does not stand about talking, but rubs its eyes and withdraws hastily with an embarrassed, incredulous, and uncomprehending blush. What made Mr Emlyn Williams write this play or Mr Gielgud and Miss Ffrangcon-Davies appear in it is not to be understood." The play closed after twelve performances. Its failure, so soon after his Shakespearean triumphs, prompted Gielgud to examine his career and his life. His domestic relationship with Perry was comfortable but unexciting, he saw no future in a film career, and the Old Vic could not afford to stage the classics on the large scale to which he aspired. He decided that he must form his own company to play Shakespeare and other classic plays in the West End.

Gielgud invested £5,000, most of his earnings from the American Hamlet; Perry, who had family money, put in the same sum. From September 1937 to April 1938 Gielgud was the tenant of the Queen's Theatre, where he presented a season consisting of Richard II, The School for Scandal, Three Sisters, and The Merchant of Venice. His company included Harry Andrews, Peggy Ashcroft, Glen Byam Shaw, George Devine, Michael Redgrave and Harcourt Williams, with Angela Baddeley and Gwen Ffrangcon-Davies as guests. His own roles were King Richard, Joseph Surface, Vershinin and Shylock. Gielgud's performances drew superlatives from reviewers and colleagues. Agate considered his Richard II, "probably the best piece of Shakespearean acting on the English stage today". Olivier said that Gielgud's Joseph Surface was "the best light comedy performance I've ever seen, or ever shall see".

The venture did not make much money, and in July 1938 Gielgud turned to more conventional West End enterprises, in unconventional circumstances. He directed Spring Meeting, a farce by Perry and Molly Keane, presented by Binkie Beaumont, for whom Perry had just left Gielgud. Somehow the three men remained on excellent terms. In September of the same year Gielgud appeared in Dodie Smith's sentimental comedy Dear Octopus. The following year he directed and appeared in The Importance of Being Earnest at the Globe, with Evans playing Lady Bracknell for the first time. They were gratified when Allan Aynesworth, who had played Algernon in the 1895 premiere, said that the new production "caught the gaiety and exactly the right atmosphere. It's all delightful!"

=== War and post-war ===
At the start of the Second World War Gielgud volunteered for active service, but was told that men of his age, thirty-five, would not be wanted for at least six months. The government quickly came to the view that most actors would do more good performing to entertain the troops and the general public than serving, whether suitable or not, in the armed forces. (Note: Among Gielgud's colleagues who managed to join up, Alec Guinness and Anthony Quayle earned distinguished war records, but, more typically in Morley's view, the authorities were very glad to release Richardson and Olivier from the Fleet Air Arm to rejoin the theatre. Gielgud told Jeremy Paxman in 1999 that he had recently discovered that Binkie Beaumont secretly told the authorities that Gielgud was unfit for military service, purely to retain his services for Beaumont's productions.)

Gielgud directed Michael Redgrave in a 1940 London production of The Beggar's Opera for the Glyndebourne Festival. This was a chaotic affair: Gielgud's direction confused his star, and when Redgrave lost his voice Gielgud had to step in and sing the role as best he could. Gielgud felt that something serious or even solemn was necessary for wartime London, where most entertainment was light-hearted. Together with Harley Granville-Barker and Guthrie he reopened the Old Vic with Shakespeare. His King Lear once again divided the critics, but his Prospero was a considerable success. He played the role quite differently from his attempt on the same stage in 1930: in place of the "manic conjurer" his Prospero was "very far from the usual mixture of Father Christmas, a Colonial Bishop, and the President of the Magicians' Union ... a clear, arresting picture of a virile Renaissance notable", according to Brown. The critics singled out, among the other players, Jack Hawkins as Caliban, Marius Goring as Ariel, Jessica Tandy as Miranda and Alec Guinness as Ferdinand.

Following the example of several of his stage colleagues, Gielgud joined tours of military camps. He gave recitals of prose and poetry, and acted in a triple bill of short plays, including two from Coward's Tonight at 8.30, but he found at first that less highbrow performers like Beatrice Lillie were better than he at entertaining the troops. He returned to filming in 1940, as Disraeli in Thorold Dickinson's The Prime Minister. In this morale-boosting film he portrayed the politician from ages thirty to seventy; this was, in Morley's view, the first time he seemed at home before the camera. Gielgud made no more films for the next ten years; he turned down the role of Julius Caesar in the 1945 film of Shaw's Caesar and Cleopatra with Vivien Leigh. He and Leigh were close friends, and Shaw tried hard to persuade him to play the part, but Gielgud had taken a strong dislike to the director, Gabriel Pascal. Caesar was eventually played by Gielgud's former teacher, Claude Rains. (Note: Although Rains had enjoyed a long and successful career as a film actor, Gielgud was so out of touch with the film world that, according to Peter Ustinov, he once said in an interview that at drama school he had a wonderful teacher. "His name was Claude Rains. ... I don't know what happened to him. I think he failed and went to America.")

Throughout 1941 and 1942 Gielgud worked continually, in Barrie's Dear Brutus, another Importance of Being Earnest in the West End, and Macbeth on tour. Returning, with more assurance than before, to entertaining the troops, he so far departed from his classical style as to join Lillie and Michael Wilding singing a comic trio. His 1943 revival of William Congreve's Love for Love on tour and then in London received high praise from reviewers. In 1944 he was approached by Ralph Richardson, who had been asked by the governors of the Old Vic to form a new company. Unwilling to take sole charge, Richardson proposed a managing triumvirate of Gielgud, Olivier and himself. Gielgud declined: "It would be a disaster, you would have to spend your whole time as referee between Larry and me."

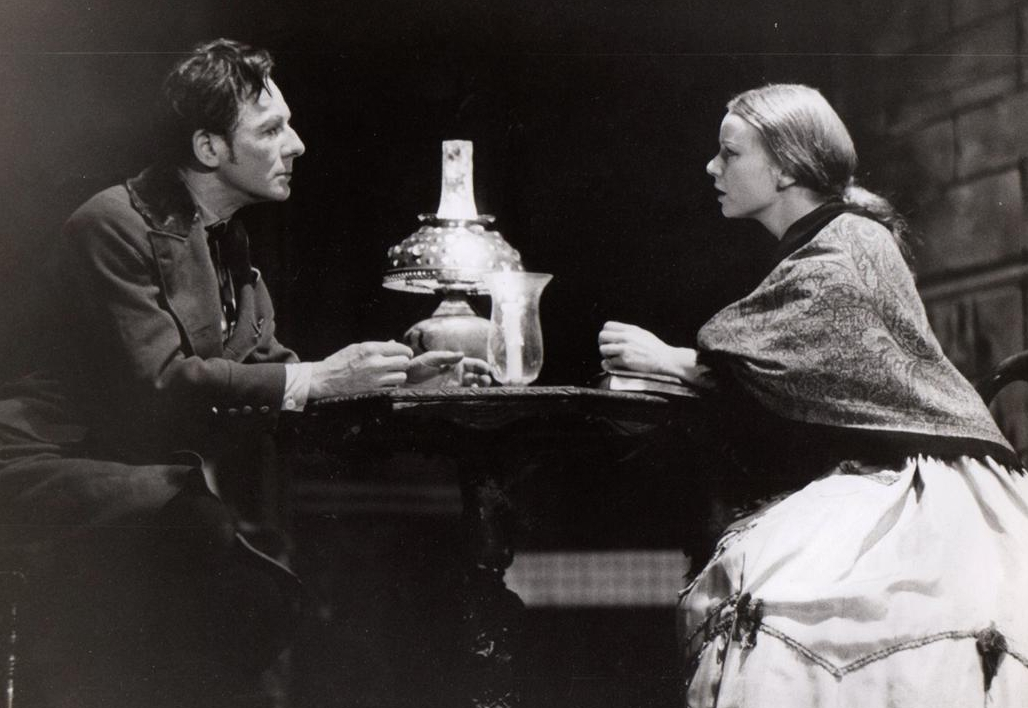
Gielgud and Dolly Haas in Crime and Punishment, Broadway, 1947

A 1944–45 season at the Haymarket for Beaumont included a Hamlet that many considered his finest. Agate wrote, "Mr Gielgud is now completely and authoritatively master of this tremendous part. ... I hold that this is, and is likely to remain, the best Hamlet of our time." Also in the season were A Midsummer Night's Dream, The Duchess of Malfi and the first major revival of Lady Windermere's Fan (1945). These productions attracted much praise, but at this point in his career Gielgud was somewhat overshadowed by his old colleagues. Olivier was celebrated for his recent film of Henry V, and with Richardson (and John Burrell in Gielgud's stead) was making the Old Vic "the most famous theatre in the Anglo-Saxon world" according to the critic Harold Hobson.

In May 1945 Gielgud bought No.16, Cowley Street, a Georgian townhouse in Westminster, central London, which remained his home for the next 31 years. (Note: In 2017 Dame Judi Dench unveiled an English Heritage Blue plaque at the house, commemorating Gielgud's 31-year residence.) In late 1945 and early 1946 he toured for ENSA in the Middle and Far East with Hamlet and Coward's Blithe Spirit. During this tour he played Hamlet on stage for the last time. He was Raskolnikoff in a stage version of Crime and Punishment, in the West End in 1946 and on Broadway the following year. Agate thought it the best thing Gielgud had done so far, other than Hamlet. Between these two engagements Gielgud toured North America in The Importance of Being Earnest and Love for Love. Edith Evans was tired of the role of Lady Bracknell, and refused to join him; Margaret Rutherford played the part to great acclaim. Gielgud was in demand as a director, with six productions in 1948–49. They included The Heiress in 1949, when he was brought in at the last moment to direct Richardson and Ashcroft, saving what seemed a doomed production; it ran for 644 performances. His last big hit of the 1940s was as Thomas Mendip in The Lady's Not for Burning, which he also directed. The London cast included the young Claire Bloom and Richard Burton, who went with Gielgud when he took the piece to the US the following year.

=== 1950s – Film success and personal crisis ===
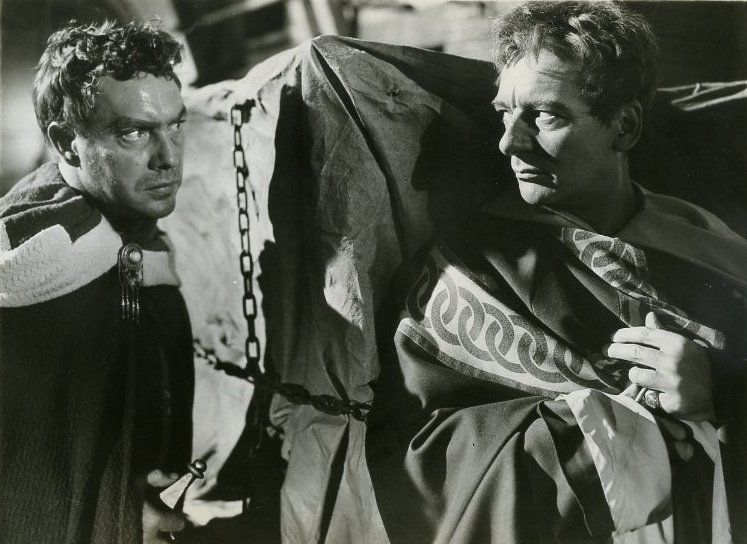
Edmond O'Brien (Casca, left) and Gielgud (Cassius) in Julius Caesar (1953)

At the Shakespeare Memorial Theatre, Stratford-upon-Avon, Gielgud did much to reclaim his position as a leading Shakespearean. His cold, unsympathetic Angelo in Peter Brook's production of Measure for Measure (1950) showed the public a new, naturalistic manner in his playing. He followed this with three other Shakespeare productions with Brook, which were well received. His own attempt at direction in Stratford, for Richardson's Macbeth in 1952, was much less successful, with poor notices for the star and worse ones for the director.

In 1953 Gielgud made his first Hollywood film, the sole classical actor in Joseph L. Mankiewicz's Julius Caesar, playing Cassius. Marlon Brando (Mark Antony) was in awe of him, and James Mason (Brutus) was disheartened at Gielgud's seemingly effortless skill. Gielgud, for his part, felt he learned much about film technique from Mason. Gielgud enjoyed his four-month stay in California, not least, as Morley comments, for the relaxed attitude there to homosexuality.

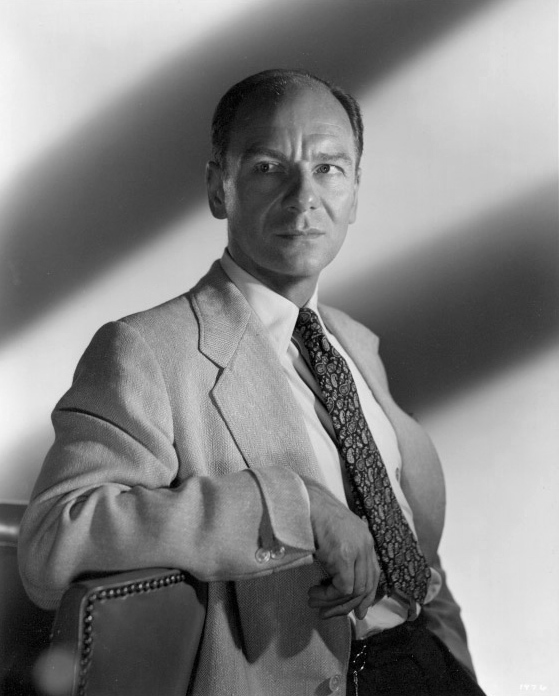
Gielgud, 1953

Returning to London later in 1953 Gielgud took over management of the Lyric, Hammersmith, for a classical season of Richard II, Congreve's The Way of the World, and Thomas Otway's Venice Preserv'd, directing the first, acting in the last, and doing both in the second. Feeling he was too old for Richard, he cast the young Paul Scofield; both the actor and the production were a critical and commercial success. During the season Gielgud was knighted in the 1953 Coronation Honours.

On the evening of 20 October 1953, Gielgud, usually highly discreet about casual sex, was arrested in Chelsea for cottaging (i.e. cruising for sex in a public lavatory). Until the 1960s sexual activity of any kind between men was illegal in Britain. (Note: The principal law against homosexual acts was the Criminal Law Amendment Act 1885, in which Section 11 made any kind of sexual activity between men illegal. It was not repealed until the passage of the Sexual Offences Act 1967.) The Home Secretary of the day, David Maxwell Fyfe, was fervently homophobic, urging the police to arrest anyone who contravened the Victorian laws against homosexuality. Gielgud was fined; when the press reported the story, he thought his disgrace would end his career. When the news broke he was in Liverpool on the pre-London tour of a new play, A Day by the Sea. According to the biographer Richard Huggett, Gielgud was so paralysed by nerves that the prospect of going onstage as usual seemed impossible, but his fellow players, led by Sybil Thorndike, encouraged him:

She grabbed him and whispered fiercely, "Come on, John darling, they won't boo me", and led him firmly on to the stage. To everybody's astonishment and indescribable relief, the audience gave him a standing ovation. They cheered, they applauded, they shouted. The message was quite clear. The English public had always been loyal to its favourites, and this was their chance to show that they didn't care tuppence what he had done in his private life ... they loved him and respected him dearly. It was a moment never to be forgotten by those who witnessed it.

An opposing account of the above is put forth in "After Oscar" by Oscar Wilde's grandson Merlin Holland. He writes:

Beaumont's biographer, Richard Huggett, ignored the very subdued reception that opening night in Liverpool and merely described Gielgud's entrance on the first night in London a month later. . . By contrast the reception in Liverpool, according to a news agency telex of the time which my father had carefully preserved with other cuttings, was somewhat different: 'Almost unnoticeably, in one of the most cleverly contrived moves onto the stage, Sir John Gielgud took the floor. There was no applause; there were no boos; a faint suggestion of a sigh.' Manipulating history to prove what a liberal-minded, tolerant society we were about homosexuality in 1953 is pointless when contemporary evidence suggests quite the opposite.

His career was safe, but the episode briefly affected Gielgud's health; he suffered a nervous breakdown some months afterwards. He never spoke publicly about the incident, and it was quickly sidelined by the press and politely ignored by writers during his lifetime. Privately he made donations to gay campaign groups, but did not endorse them in public. In his later years he said to the actor Simon Callow, "I do admire people like you and Ian McKellen for coming out, but I can't be doing with that myself."

Between December 1953 and June 1955 Gielgud concentrated on directing and did not appear on stage. His productions ranged from a revival of Charley's Aunt with John Mills to The Cherry Orchard with Ffrangcon-Davies, and Twelfth Night with Olivier. His return to the stage was in a production of King Lear, which was badly hampered by costumes and scenery by Isamu Noguchi that the critics found ludicrous. A revival of Much Ado About Nothing with Ashcroft in 1955 was much better received; in The Manchester Guardian, Philip Hope-Wallace called it "Shakespearean comedy for once perfectly realised". In 1955 Gielgud made his second appearance in a film of Shakespeare, portraying Clarence in Olivier's Richard III.

In the second half of the 1950s Gielgud's career was in the doldrums as far as new plays were concerned. British theatre was moving away from the West End glamour of Beaumont's productions to more avant-garde works. Olivier had a great success in John Osborne's The Entertainer in 1957, but Gielgud was not in tune with the new wave of writers. (Note: In 1955 Gielgud advised Richardson not to accept the role of Estragon in Beckett's Waiting for Godot, describing the piece as rubbish. Richardson later deeply regretted taking his friend's advice, recognising the work as "the greatest play of my generation".) He remained in demand as a Shakespearean, but there were few new plays suitable for him. He directed and played the lead in Coward's Nude with Violin in 1956, which was dismissed by the critics as old-fashioned, though it ran for more than a year. He made two film appearances, playing a cameo comedy scene with Coward as a prospective manservant in Michael Anderson's Around the World in 80 Days (1956), and as the father of Elizabeth Barrett Browning in Sidney Franklin's 1957 remake of The Barretts of Wimpole Street. He did not consider his performance as the tyrannical father convincing, and confessed that he undertook it only for the large fee ("it will set me up for a couple of years") and to keep him before the public in America, where he had not performed for over four years.

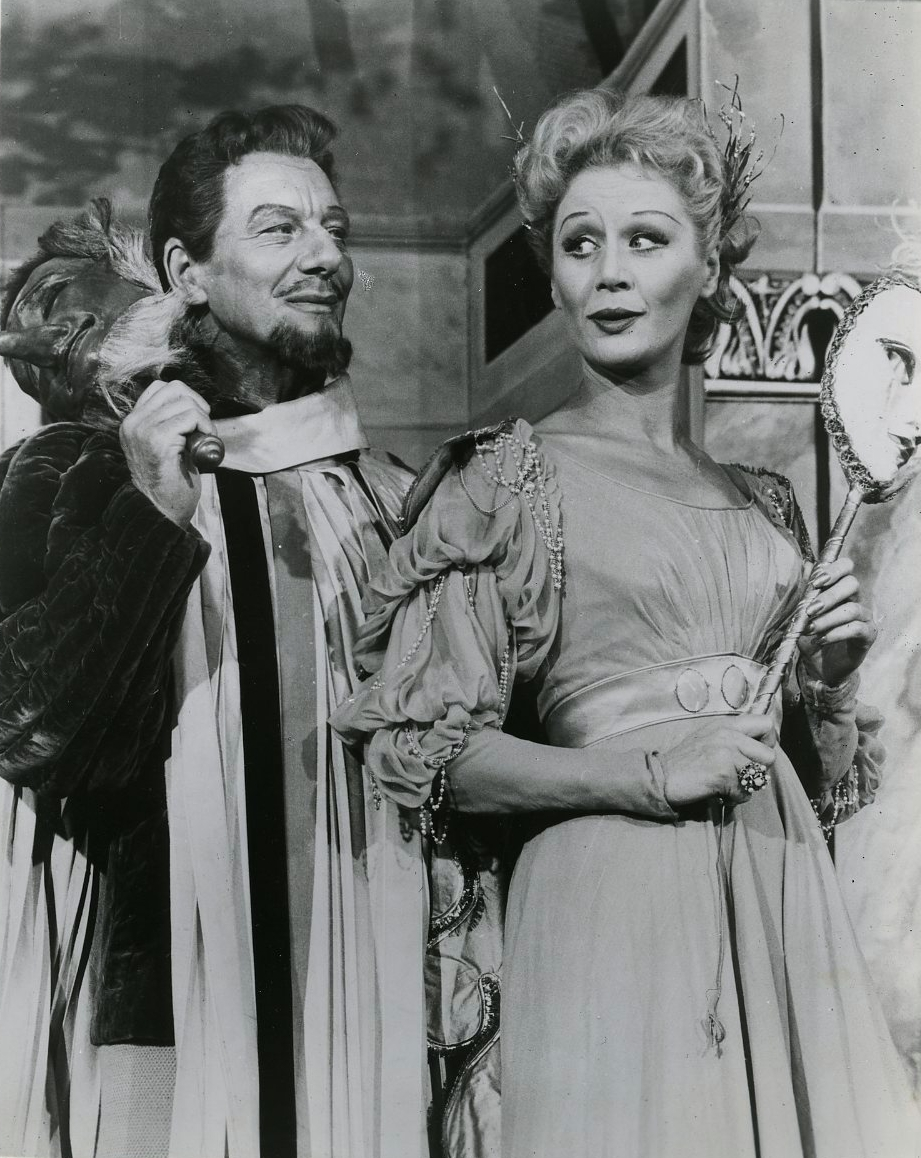
Much Ado About Nothing: Gielgud as Benedick and Margaret Leighton as Beatrice, 1959

During 1957 Gielgud directed Berlioz's The Trojans at Covent Garden and played Prospero at Drury Lane, but the production central to his career over the late 1950s and into the 1960s was his one-man show The Ages of Man. He first appeared in this in 1956 and revived it every year until 1967. It was an anthology of Shakespearean speeches and sonnets, compiled by George Rylands, in which, wearing modern evening clothes on a plain stage, Gielgud recited the verses, with his own linking commentary. He performed it all over Britain, mainland Europe, Australasia and the US, including a performance at the White House in 1965. He found there were advantages to performing solo: "You've no idea how much easier it is without a Juliet. When there's a beautiful girl above you on a balcony, or lying on a tomb with candles round her, naturally the audience look at her the whole time, and Romeo has to pull out all the stops to get any attention." His performance on Broadway won him a Special Tony Award in 1959, and an audio recording in 1979 received a Grammy Award. He made many other recordings, both before and after this, including ten Shakespeare plays.

Gielgud continued to try, without much success, to find new plays that suited him as an actor, but his direction of Peter Shaffer's first play, Five Finger Exercise (1958), received acclaim. While in the US for the Shaffer play, Gielgud revived Much Ado About Nothing, this time with Margaret Leighton as his Beatrice. Most of the New York critics praised the production, and they all praised the co-stars. He gave his first performances on television during 1959, in Rattigan's The Browning Version for CBS and N. C. Hunter's A Day by the Sea for ITV. He appeared in more than fifty more plays on television over the next four decades.

=== 1960s ===
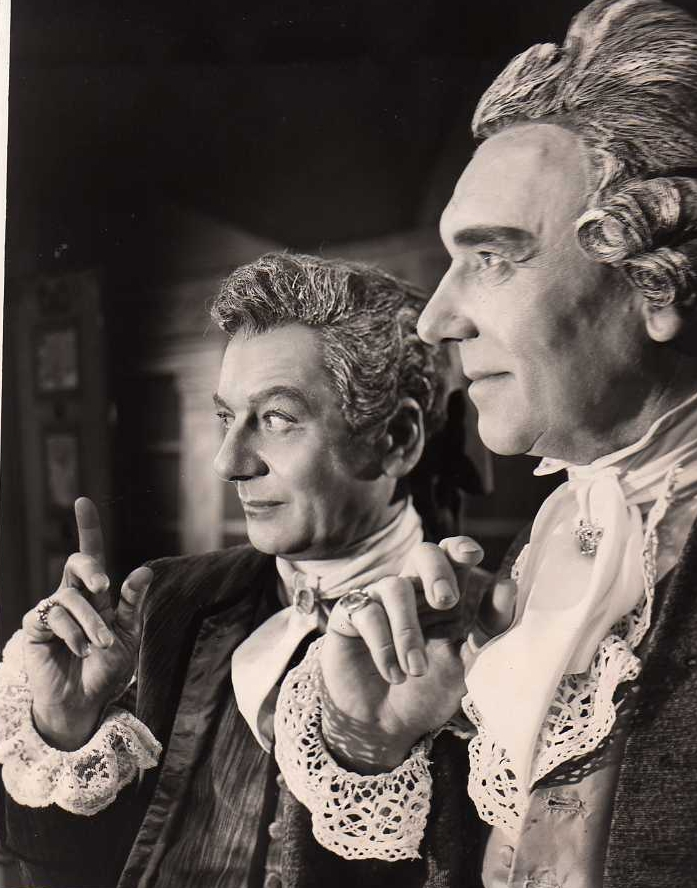
Gielgud (left) as Joseph Surface, and Ralph Richardson as Sir Peter Teazle, The School for Scandal, 1962

During the early 1960s Gielgud had more successes as a director than as an actor. He directed the first London performance of Britten's opera A Midsummer Night's Dream (1961) at Covent Garden (Note: The assistant director, John Copley, recalled Gielgud's remark on Britten's music for the rude mechanicals, "Why did he write this dreadful music for those beautiful words?", but both the music and the staging won enthusiastic reviews.) and Hugh Wheeler's Big Fish, Little Fish on Broadway, the latter winning him a Tony Award for Best Direction of a Play in 1961. His performance as Othello at Stratford in the same year was less successful; Franco Zeffirelli's production was thought ponderous and Gielgud "singularly unvehement". As Gaev in The Cherry Orchard to the Ranevskaya of Ashcroft he had the best of the notices; his co-star and the production received mixed reviews. The following year Gielgud directed Richardson in The School for Scandal, first at the Haymarket and then on a North American tour, which he joined as, in his words, "the oldest Joseph Surface in the business".

In 1962 Gielgud met Martin Hensler (1932–99), an interior designer exiled from Hungary. He was temperamental, and Gielgud's friends often found him difficult, but the two became a long-term couple and lived together until Hensler's death. Under his influence Gielgud moved his main residence from central London to the South Pavilion of Wotton House at Wotton Underwood in Buckinghamshire.

Gielgud received an Oscar nomination for his performance as King Louis VII of France in Becket (1964), with Richard Burton in the title role. Morley comments, "A minor but flashy role, this had considerable and long-lasting importance; his unrivalled theatrical dignity could greatly enhance a film." In 1964 Gielgud directed Burton in Hamlet on Broadway. Burton's performance received reviews ranging from polite to hostile, but the production was a box-office success, and a film was made of it. Gielgud finally began to take the cinema seriously, for financial and sometimes artistic reasons. He told his agent to accept any reasonable film offers. His films of the mid-1960s were Tony Richardson's The Loved One (1965), which Croall termed a disaster despite later acclaim, and Orson Welles's Falstaff film Chimes at Midnight (1966), which was unsuccessful at the time but has since been recognised as "one of the best, albeit most eccentric, of all Shakespearean movies", according to Morley. (Note: Gielgud played Henry IV of England; Welles played Sir John Falstaff.)

Much of Gielgud's theatre work in the later 1960s was as a director: Chekhov's Ivanov at the Phoenix in London and the Shubert in New York, Peter Ustinov's Half Way Up the Tree at the Queen's and Mozart's Don Giovanni at the Coliseum. One potentially outstanding acting role, Ibsen's Bishop Nicholas, fell through in 1967 when Olivier, with whom he was to co-star at the National Theatre in The Pretenders, was ill. Gielgud played Orgon in Tartuffe and the title role in Seneca's Oedipus during the National's 1967–68 season, but according to Croall neither production was satisfactory. After this, Gielgud at last found a modern role that suited him and which he played to acclaim: the Headmaster in Alan Bennett's first play, Forty Years On (1968). The notices for both play and star were excellent. John Barber wrote in The Daily Telegraph that "Gielgud dominates all with an unexpected caricature of a mincing pedant, his noble features blurred so as to mimic a fussed and fatuous egghead. From the great mandarin of the theatre, a delicious comic creation."

Having finally embraced film-making, Gielgud appeared in six films in 1967–69. His most substantial role was Lord Raglan in Tony Richardson's The Charge of the Light Brigade. His other roles, in films including Michael Anderson's The Shoes of the Fisherman (1968) as a fictional pope and Richard Attenborough's Oh! What a Lovely War (1969) as Count Leopold Berchtold, were cameo appearances in character roles.

=== 1970s – Career revival ===
In 1970 Gielgud played another modern role in which he had great success; he joined Ralph Richardson at the Royal Court in Chelsea in David Storey's Home. The play is set in the gardens of a nursing home for mental patients, though this is not clear at first. The two elderly men converse in a desultory way, are joined and briefly enlivened by two more extrovert female patients, are slightly scared by another male patient, and are then left together, conversing even more emptily. The Punch critic Jeremy Kingston wrote:

At the end of the play, as the climax to two perfect, delicate performances, Sir Ralph and Sir John are standing, staring out above the heads of the audience, cheeks wet with tears in memory of some unnamed misery, weeping soundlessly as the lights fade on them. It makes a tragic, unforgettable close.

The play transferred to the West End and then to Broadway. In The New York Times Clive Barnes wrote, "The two men, bleakly examining the little nothingness of their lives, are John Gielgud and Ralph Richardson giving two of the greatest performances of two careers that have been among the glories of the English-speaking theater." The original cast recorded the play for television in 1972.

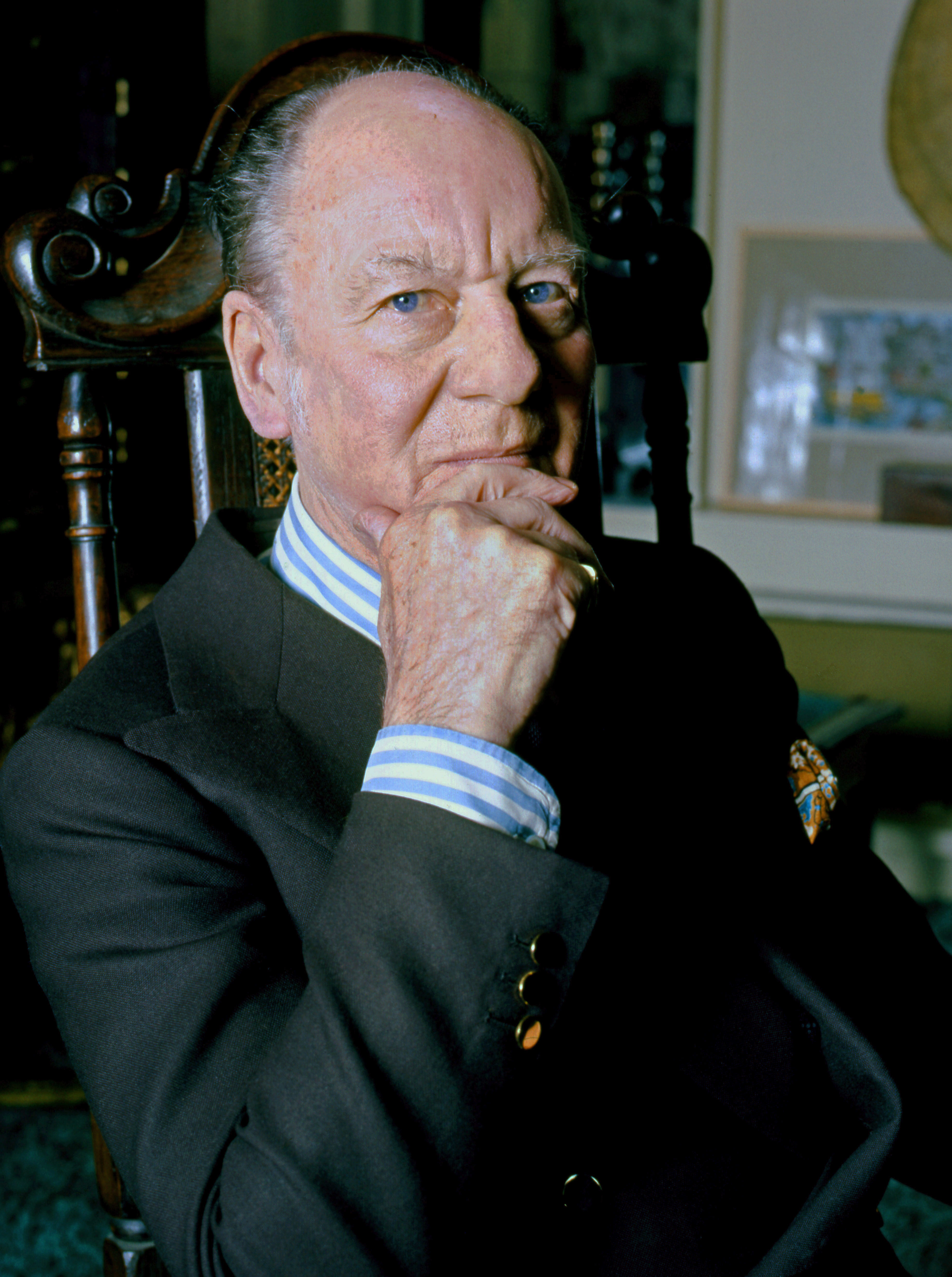
Gielgud in 1973, by Allan Warren

In the first half of the decade Gielgud made seven films and six television dramas. Morley describes his choice as indiscriminate, but singles out for praise his performances in 1974 as the Old Cardinal in Joseph Losey's Galileo and the manservant Beddoes in Sidney Lumet's Murder on the Orient Express. In a 1971 BBC presentation of James Elroy Flecker's Hassan, Gielgud played the Caliph to Richardson's Hassan. The critic of The Illustrated London News said that viewers would "shiver at a towering performance by Gielgud, as a Caliph with all the purring beauty and ruthlessness of a great golden leopard". In the theatre Gielgud directed Coward's Private Lives and Somerset Maugham's The Constant Wife (both 1973, London and 1974, New York). His final production as a director was Pinero's The Gay Lord Quex (1975).

Gielgud continued his long stage association with Richardson in Harold Pinter's No Man's Land (1975), directed by Hall at the National. Richardson played Hirst, a prosperous but isolated and vulnerable author, and Gielgud was Spooner, a down-at-heel sponger and opportunist. Hall found the play "extremely funny and also extremely bleak". (Note: The long pauses in the middle of the dialogue troubled both actors during early rehearsals, and they had to relearn their stage technique to accommodate them. Gielgud told Hall, "I never pause in the West End. The first time I played there I took a big pause, and a woman cried out in the balcony, 'Oh, you beast. You've come all over my umbrella!'") The production was a critical and box-office success and, over a period of three years, played at the Old Vic, in the West End, at the Lyttelton Theatre in the new National Theatre complex, on Broadway and on television. In Julian Mitchell's Half-Life (1977) at the National, Gielgud was warmly praised by reviewers; he reprised the role at the Duke of York's Theatre in the West End in 1978 and on tour the following year.

In the latter part of the decade Gielgud worked more for cinema and television than on stage. His film work included what Morley calls "his most embarrassing professional appearance", in Caligula (1979), Gore Vidal's story of Ancient Rome, spiced with pornographic scenes. In Gielgud's ten other films from this period, his most substantial role was Clive Langham in Alain Resnais' Providence (1977). Gielgud thought it "by far the most exciting film I have ever made". He won a New York Film Critics Circle award for his performance as a dying author, "drunk half the time ... throwing bottles about, and roaring a lot of very coarse dialogue". His other film parts included the Head Master of Eton in Jack Gold's Aces High (1976) and Tomlinson in Otto Preminger's The Human Factor (1979). For television his roles included Lord Henry Wotton in The Picture of Dorian Gray (1976), John of Gaunt in Richard II (1978) and Chorus in Romeo and Juliet (1978).

=== Later years ===
In the 1980s Gielgud appeared in more than twenty films. Morley singles out as noteworthy The Elephant Man (1980), as the chairman of the Royal London Hospital; Chariots of Fire (1981), as the Master of Trinity College, Cambridge; Gandhi (1982), as Lord Irwin (the latter two winning Academy Awards as Best Picture); and The Shooting Party (1984) and Plenty (1985), directed by David Lynch, Hugh Hudson, Richard Attenborough, Alan Bridges and Fred Schepisi respectively. Tony Palmer's Wagner (1983) was the only film in which Gielgud, Richardson, and Olivier played scenes together. (Note: The three are seen together in long shot near the opening of Olivier's film of Richard III but with no shared dialogue.) Gielgud made cameo appearances in films of little merit, lending distinction while not damaging his own reputation. He told an interviewer, "They pay me very well for two or three days' work a month, so why not? It's nice at my age to be able to travel all over the world at other people's expense."

Gielgud's most successful film performance of the decade was Steve Gordon's comedy Arthur (1981), which starred Dudley Moore as a self-indulgent playboy. Gielgud played Hobson, Moore's butler. He turned the part down twice before finally accepting it, nervous, after the Caligula débâcle, of the strong language used by the acerbic Hobson. He won an Oscar as Best Supporting Actor and other awards for the performance. (Note: He also won a Golden Globe and awards from both the New York and Los Angeles Critics' Circles.) He placed little value on awards, and avoided presentation ceremonies whenever he could: "I really detest all the mutual congratulation baloney and the invidious comparisons which they evoke."

For television Gielgud played nineteen roles during the 1980s; they included Edward Ryder in an eleven-part adaptation of Waugh's Brideshead Revisited (1982). The Times said that he gave the role "a desolate and calculated malice which carries almost singlehandedly [the] first two episodes". Near the end of the decade, Gielgud was nominated for a Primetime Emmy Award for his role as Aaron Jastrow, a Jewish professor murdered in the Holocaust, in the mini-series War and Remembrance. At the decade's end he played a rakish journalist, Haverford Downs, in John Mortimer's Summer's Lease, for which he won an Emmy.

Gielgud's final West End play was Hugh Whitemore's The Best of Friends (1988). He played Sir Sydney Cockerell, director of the Fitzwilliam Museum, in a representation of a friendship between Cockerell, Bernard Shaw and Laurentia McLachlan, a Benedictine nun. Gielgud had some trouble learning his lines; at one performance he almost forgot them, momentarily distracted by seeing in a 1938 copy of The Times, read by his character, a review of his own portrayal of Vershinin in Three Sisters fifty years earlier.

In 1990 Gielgud made his last film appearance in a leading role, playing Prospero in Prospero's Books, Peter Greenaway's adaptation of The Tempest. Reviews for the film were mixed, but Gielgud's performance in one of his signature roles was much praised. He continued to work on radio, as he had done throughout his career; Croall lists more than fifty BBC radio productions of plays starring Gielgud between 1929 and 1994. To mark his ninetieth birthday he played Lear for the last time; for the BBC Kenneth Branagh gathered a cast that included Judi Dench, Eileen Atkins and Emma Thompson as Lear's daughters, with actors such as Bob Hoskins, Derek Jacobi and Simon Russell Beale in supporting roles. He continued to appear on television until 1998; his last major role in the medium was in a BBC production in 1994 of J. B. Priestley's rarely-revived Summer Day's Dream. Subsequently, he made further cameo appearances in films including Branagh's Hamlet (as King Priam, 1996), (Note: Priam and his wife Hecuba, played by Judi Dench, were interpolations of the director, portrayed in flashback during the Player King's speech.) Dragonheart (as the voice of King Arthur, 1996), and Shine (as Cecil Parkes, 1996). His last feature film appearance was as Pope Pius V in Shekhar Kapur's Elizabeth (1998). In 2000 he had a non-speaking role alongside Pinter in a film of Beckett's short play Catastrophe directed by David Mamet.

Gielgud's partner, Martin Hensler, died in 1999. After this, Gielgud went into a physical and psychological decline; he died at home on 21 May 2000, at the age of 96. At his request there was no memorial service, and his funeral at All Saints' Church, Wotton Underwood, was private, for family and close friends.

== Honours, character and reputation ==
Gielgud's state honours were Knight Bachelor (1953), Legion of Honour (France, 1960), Member of the Order of the Companions of Honour (1977), and Member of the Order of Merit (UK, 1996). He was awarded honorary degrees by St Andrews, Oxford and Brandeis universities.

From 1977 to 1989 Gielgud was president of the Royal Academy of Dramatic Art – a symbolic position – and was the academy's first honorary fellow (1989). In 1994 the Globe Theatre in Shaftesbury Avenue was renamed the Gielgud Theatre. He had not acted on stage for six years, and felt out of touch with the West End: he commented on the renaming of the theatre, "At last there is a name in lights on the Avenue which I actually recognise, even if it is my own."

Gielgud was uninterested in religion or politics. As a boy he had been fascinated by the rituals at Westminster Abbey, but his brief attraction to religion quickly faded, and as an adult he was a non-believer. His indifference to politics was illustrated at a formal dinner not long after the Second World War when he asked a fellow guest, "Whereabouts are you living now?", unaware that, as he was talking to Clement Attlee, the answer was "10 Downing Street".

In his Who's Who entry Gielgud listed his hobbies as music and painting, but his concentration on his work, which Emlyn Williams called fanatical, left little scope for leisure activities. His dedication to his art was not solemn. The critic Nicholas de Jongh wrote that Gielgud's personality was "such infinite, mischievous fun", and Coward's biographer Cole Lesley recalled the pleasure of Gielgud's company, "the words tumbling out of his mouth in an avalanche, frequently having to wipe away his own tears of laughter at the funniness of the disasters he recounted, disasters always against himself".

Together with Richardson and Olivier, Gielgud was internationally recognised as one of the "great trinity of theatrical knights" who dominated the British stage for more than fifty years during the middle and later decades of the 20th century.

The critic Michael Coveney wrote, for Gielgud's ninety-fifth birthday:

I have seen Olivier, Ralph Richardson, Alec Guinness and Peggy Ashcroft but John Gielgud is something else. Gielgud is the lone survivor of those great actors whose careers laid the foundation stones of modern theatre. He is acclaimed as the greatest speaker of Shakespearean verse this century. People my age and younger can only take on trust the impact of the Hamlet whose influence lasted more than 30 years. Even the recordings do not quite convey the mellifluous magic of the voice once described by Guinness as a "silver trumpet muffled in silk". He is indelibly linked with the roles of Prospero and King Lear – regarded as pinnacles of theatrical achievement – yet he is also widely remembered for his wonderful comic touch as Jack Worthing in Wilde's The Importance of Being Earnest. But his influence goes far beyond his performances. Without Gielgud there would be no National Theatre or Royal Shakespeare Company. He was a pioneer in establishing the first permanent companies in the West End.

In an obituary in The Independent Alan Strachan, having discussed Gielgud's work for cinema, radio and television, concluded that "any consideration of Gielgud's rich and often astonishing career must return to the stage; as he wrote at the close of An Actor and His Time (1979), he saw the theatre as 'more than an occupation or a profession; for me it has been a life'."

== Books by Gielgud ==
=== Autobiography ===
- Early Stages. London: Macmillan. 1939. OCLC 250105547.
- Stage Directions. London: Heinemann. 1963. OCLC 255709348.
- Distinguished Company. London: Heinemann. 1972. ISBN 0435183532.
- An Actor and His Time. London: Sidgwick and Jackson. 1979. ISBN 0283985739.
- Backward Glances. London: Hodder & Stoughton. 1989. ISBN 0340429259.
- John Miller, ed. (1991). Acting Shakespeare. New York: Scribner, Maxwell, Macmillan. ISBN 0684195119.
- Richard Mangan, ed. (1994). John Gielgud's Notes from the Gods – Playgoing in the Twenties. London: Nick Hern. ISBN 1854591053.
- Richard Mangan, ed. (2004). Gielgud's Letters. London: Weidenfeld and Nicolson. ISBN 0297829890.

=== Anthology ===
- Sir John Gielgud's Ages of Man. New York: Caedmon. 1979. OCLC 15733016.

=== Acting versions ===
- Chekhov, Anton (1963). The Cherry Orchard. New York: Theatre Arts Books. OCLC 1669979.
- Chekhov, Anton (1966). Ivanov. New York: Theatre Arts Books. OCLC 1380663. Based on a translation by Edward Nicolaeff.

== See also ==
- List of Academy Award winners and nominees from Great Britain
- List of actors with Academy Award nominations
- List of actors with more than one Academy Award nomination in the acting categories
- List of Golden Globe winners
- List of LGBTQ Academy Award winners and nominees – Confirmed individuals for Best Supporting Actor
- List of oldest and youngest Academy Award winners and nominees — Oldest winners for Best Supporting Actor
- List of Royal National Theatre Company actors
- List of Primetime Emmy Award winners

== Notes and references ==
Notes

== Sources ==
- Agate, James (1939). The Amazing Theatre. London: Harrap. OCLC 9430902.
- Carpenter, Humphrey (1992). Benjamin Britten: A Biography. London: Faber and Faber. ISBN 0571143245.
- Croall, Jonathan (2000). Gielgud – A Theatrical Life, 1904–2000. London: Methuen. ISBN 0413745600.
- Croall, Jonathan (2011). John Gielgud – Matinee Idol to Movie Star. London: Methuen. ISBN 1408131064.
- Croall, Jonathan, ed. (2013). Gielgoodies – The Wit and Wisdom and Gaffes of John Gielgud. London: Oberon Books. ISBN 1783190078.
- Findlater, Richard (1983). These our Actors – A Celebration of the Theatre Acting of Peggy Ashcroft, John Gielgud, Laurence Olivier, Ralph Richardson. London: Elm Tree Books. ISBN 0241111358.
- Gaye, Freda, ed. (1967). Who's Who in the Theatre (fourteenth ed.). London: Sir Isaac Pitman and Sons. OCLC 5997224.
- Gielgud, John (1979). An Actor and His Time. London: Sidgwick and Jackson. ISBN 0283985739.
- Gielgud, John (2000) [1939 and 1989]. Gielgud on Gielgud – volume comprising reprints of Early Stages and Backward Glances. London: Hodder and Stoughton. ISBN 0340795026.
- Gielgud, John (2004). Richard Mangan (ed.). Gielgud's Letters. London: Weidenfeld and Nicolson. ISBN 0297829890.
- Gielgud, Val (1965). Years in a Mirror. London: Bodley Head. OCLC 1599748.
- Gilbert, Susie (2009). Opera for Everybody. London: Faber and Faber. ISBN 0571224938.
- Harwood, Ronald (1984). The Ages of Gielgud – An Actor at Eighty. London: Hodder and Stoughton. ISBN 0340348283.
- Hayman, Ronald (1971). Gielgud. London: Heinemann. ISBN 0435184008.
- Hobson, Harold (1958). Ralph Richardson. London: Rockliff. OCLC 3797774.
- Holland, Merlin (2026). After Oscar (1st ed.). New York: Europa Editions. ISBN 979-8-88966-176-4.
- Huggett, Richard (1989). Binkie Beaumont – Éminence Grise of the West End Theatre, 1933–1973. London: Hodder and Stoughton. ISBN 0340412690.
- Lesley, Cole (1976). The Life of Noel Coward. London: Cape. ISBN 0224012886.
- Lyttelton, George; Rupert Hart-Davis (1982). Lyttelton/Hart-Davis Letters, Volume 4. London: John Murray. ISBN 0719539412.
- Miller, John (1995). Ralph Richardson – The Authorized Biography. London: Sidgwick and Jackson. ISBN 0283062371.
- Morley, Sheridan (2001). John G – The Authorised Biography of John Gielgud. London: Hodder and Stoughton. ISBN 0340368039.
- Page, Malcolm (1993). File on Pinter. London: Methuen. ISBN 0413536203.
- Sužiedėlis, Saulius (2011). Historical Dictionary of Lithuania. Lanham, Maryland, US: Scarecrow Press. ISBN 0810849143.
- Tanitch, Robert (1988). Gielgud. London: Harrap. ISBN 0245545603.
- Tynan, Kenneth (1964). Tynan on Theatre. London: Penguin Books. OCLC 949598.
- Ustinov, Peter (1978) [1977]. Dear Me. Harmondsworth, UK: Penguin. ISBN 0140049401.
- Weeks, Jeffrey (1989). Sex, Politics and Society. London: Longman. ISBN 0582483336.
- White, Rob; Edward Buscombe (2003). British Film Institute Film Classics. London and New York: BFI and Fitzroy Dearborn. ISBN 1579583288.
