= Val Gielgud =

English actor, writer and director (1900–1981)

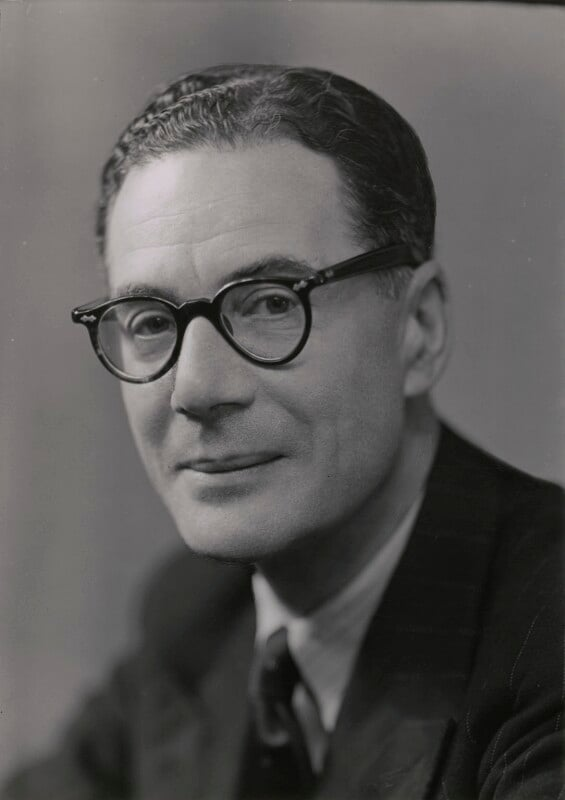
Gielgud in 1949

Val Henry Gielgud CBE (28 April 1900 – 30 November 1981) was an English actor, writer, director and broadcaster. He was a pioneer of radio drama for the BBC, and also directed the first ever drama to be produced in the newer medium of television.

Val Gielgud was born in London, into a theatrical family, being the brother of Sir John Gielgud (who acted in several of his productions) and a great-nephew of the Victorian actress Dame Ellen Terry.

== BBC radio ==
Following education at Oxford University, Gielgud began his career as a secretary to a member of parliament, before moving into writing when he took a job as the sub-editor of a comic book / magazine. It was this job that led him to work for the BBC's own listings magazine, the Radio Times, as the assistant to the editor Eric Maschwitz. This was Gielgud's first connection to the corporation, and although he was not yet involved in any radio production, he often used his position at the magazine to make his thoughts on radio dramas felt: in his autobiography, he later confessed to having written several of the letters appearing on the magazine's correspondence page, supposedly from listeners, criticising various aspects of the corporation's drama productions.

Maschwitz and Gielgud were close friends, and even wrote detective fiction together – Gielgud would later on go on to be responsible in whole or part for twenty-six detective / mystery novels, one short story collection, two historical novels, nineteen stage plays, four film screenplays, forty radio plays, seven non-fiction books and be the editor of a further two books.

In January 1929, Gielgud was appointed Head of Productions at the BBC (BBC Radio Drama), responsible for all radio drama, when he had never previously directed a single radio play. He succeeded R. E. Jeffrey, whose output he had been so regularly criticising in his abuse of the Radio Times letters page. He proved to be highly successful in this role, remaining in it for the next twenty years and overseeing all of the radio drama produced during the period, writing many plays himself and worked as an actor in small parts in six of them.

Gielgud is often praised with inventing many of the techniques of radio drama still common in the form today. He constantly reminded those working with and under him that radio drama could employ vastly larger casts and place itself in more exotic settings than was possible with regular stage plays, and held a theory that while stage plays could show the actions of characters, in radio it was possible to get inside their minds.

He was not an advocate of the soap opera genre – which was rising to prominence on radio in the United States at the time – instead, he preferred to concentrate on producing a variety of one-off dramas, rather than continuing series. He was not averse to producing the popular as well as the cultural though, with various mysteries and thrillers being broadcast as well as classical productions of Shakespeare plays among others.

== BBC television ==
In July 1930, Gielgud was invited in his position as the senior drama producer at BBC radio to oversee the experimental transmission of a short play on the new medium of television. The play, The Man With the Flower in His Mouth by Italian playwright Luigi Pirandello, was chosen because of its confined setting, small cast of characters and short length of around half an hour. Transmitted live on the evening of 14 July, the primitive state of television technology at the time allowed for only tiny 30-line pictures with one actor visible at a time, but the experiment was nonetheless judged to have been a success, and was watched by the then Prime Minister, Ramsay MacDonald.

Gielgud remained in radio for the rest of the decade, also working occasionally in film, adapting his thriller Death at Broadcasting House, in which he also appeared in a small acting role. In 1939 he returned to television for a time on a secondment to the BBC Television Service at Alexandra Palace, which was now a full-fledged, high-definition television network broadcasting to the London area. On secondment from his radio job, he produced one short play called Ending It, an adaptation of one of his own short stories starring John Robinson and Joan Marion, transmitted on 25 August 1939. However, a full-length play he was due to direct, and which had even been rehearsed, was cancelled from its planned slot on the evening of 1 September due to the television service having been suspended earlier that day in anticipation of the declaration of war.

Gielgud returned to radio for the duration of the Second World War, but shortly after the return of the television service in 1946, he moved across on a more permanent basis to become the Head of BBC television drama. Although the BBC hoped he would have the same impact on shaping the genre in the new medium as he had done in radio, his time in charge was not regarded as a success, as many of the producers working under him felt he had no great liking for television or appreciation for what it could achieve that radio could not. In 1952, he left the television service, being replaced by the experienced producer Michael Barry.

In the 1950s, Gielgud was involved in directing a run of Sherlock Holmes radio plays starring his brother John as the lead character, with Ralph Richardson as Dr Watson and Gielgud himself once appearing as Mycroft Holmes. These were broadcast on the BBC's Light Programme. By this time Gielgud was in conflict with junior colleagues in the drama department; unlike them he was unable to appreciate the work of playwrights such as Harold Pinter and Samuel Beckett. Beckett's Waiting for Godot would have made its English début in a radio production had Gielgud not rejected it.

== Private life ==
Gielgud was married five times, the first in 1921 while he was still an undergraduate at Oxford, where he married an eighteen-year-old schoolgirl who was a student at Cheltenham Ladies College. She was Natalia Mamontov (1903–1969), daughter of musician Sergei Mamontov (1877—1938) and Natalia Sheremetievskaya Brasova; her mother's third husband was Grand Duke Michael, brother of Tsar Nicholas II. This lasted for only two years, however, and they divorced in 1926.

Gielgud in 1928 married Barbara Dillon, an actress, who was born Mabel Barbara Joan Druce and was the daughter of the actor Hubert Druce and actress Frances Dillon (real name Ethel Buckle). She divorced him on the grounds of his desertion in 1943; he went on holiday alone in 1931 and they did not live together thereafter. The marriage produced a son, Adam, born in 1930 – father of the dancer and choreographer Piers Gielgud.

His following three marriages produced no further offspring.

He was awarded the CBE in 1958. He published "One Year of Grace" – A Fragment of Autobiography (Longmans, Green) in 1950 and also the autobiographical My Cats and Myself (Michael Joseph) in 1972. Val Gielgud died in London in 1981 at the age of eighty-one.

== Portrayal in fiction ==
Gielgud appears as a character in the 2023 BBC radio play, A Wireless War, which tells the story of the relocation of the Radio Drama Company to Evesham at the start of World War II. Gielgud is played by Carl Prekopp.

== Selected filmography ==
- Death at Broadcasting House (1934)
- Men Are Not Gods (1936)
- Cafe Colette (1937)

== Selected works ==
- Imperial Treasure (1931)
- Death at Broadcasting House (1934)
- Under London (1934)
- Death in Budapest (1937)
- The First Television Murder (1940)
- Years of the Locust (1947)
- Gallows' Foot (1958)
- A Necessary End (1969)

== Selected plays ==
- Party Manners (1949)

Media offices
Preceded by New position	BBC Television Head of Drama; 1949-1952	Succeeded by Michael Barry
