= Telstra Ballet Dancer Awards =

Australian ballet dancer awards

The Telstra Ballet Dancer Award has been made annually since 2003, in support of the aspirations of The Australian Ballet's elite young dancers. The winner receives a cash prize of $20,000. This is the biggest prize available specifically to a dancer in Australia.

Nominees are selected by The Australian Ballet and previous award winners. A judging panel composed of representatives from The Australian Ballet, Telstra and the media selects the winner based on "the artistic quality of their work, the strength of a written submission, their personal development, and future potential."

== History of the awards ==
The awards are announced in early December, usually in the Joan Sutherland Theatre, Sydney Opera House (venue for Sydney seasons by The Australian Ballet).

In 2019, the awards were announced on the Sydney opening night of Peter Wright's The Nutcracker on 30 November 2019.

The 2018 awards were announced on the opening night of Alexei Ratmansky's Cinderella on 30 November 2018.

In 2017, as the Joan Sutherland Theatre was unavailable, the company's Sydney November–December season took place at the Capitol Theatre. The announcement of the award winners was made on 5 December 2017, opening night of Alice's Adventures in Wonderland.

The 2016 awards were announced on the opening night of Coppélia on 2 December 2016.

The 2015 awards were announced on the opening night of The Sleeping Beauty on 3 December 2015.

The 2014 awards were announced after a dress rehearsal of The Nutcracker on 27 November 2014.

The 2013 awards were announced on the opening night of Cinderella (choreography by Alexei Ratmansky) on 29 November.

The 2012 award winners were announced on the Sydney opening night of Stephen Baynes' Swan Lake on 30 November.

The 2011 awards were announced on the opening night of Romeo & Juliet (choreography by Graeme Murphy) on 2 December.

The 2010 announcement of both Award winners was made on the opening night of The Nutcracker on 3 December 2010. For the first time since the inauguration of the awards, the judging panel was unable to separate two dancers for the main award, and each received $20,000.

== Telstra People's Choice Award ==
In addition, the Telstra People's Choice Award, with a cash prize of $5,000, is made to the most popular of the nominees in that year, as determined by internet and SMS votes from the public. From 2010, competitors began to report on their activities via an individual Twitter account as part of the competition, and in 2013 competitors began using Instagram as a publicity tool. Amber Scott was the first dancer to win both awards (in 2004) followed by Stephanie Williams, Chengwu Guo and Jade Wood. Danielle Rowe, Amy Harris, Jake Mangakahia and Marcus Morelli have each won the People's Choice Award twice. Amy Harris has won a total of three awards.

== Recipients ==
=== Ballet Dancer Award ===
- 2025 Adam Elmes
- 2024 Sara Andrlon
- 2023 Lilla Harvey
- 2022 Rina Nemoto
- 2020/21 Nathan Brook
- 2019 Jill Ogai
- 2018 Jade Wood
- 2017 Valerie Tereshchenko
- 2016 Callum Linnane
- 2015 Benedicte Bemet
- 2014 Dimity Azoury
- 2013 Christopher Rodgers-Wilson
- 2012 Amy Harris
- 2011 Chengwu Guo
- 2010 Ty King-Wall and Dana Stephensen
- 2009 Stephanie Williams
- 2008 Kevin Jackson
- 2007 Daniel Gaudiello
- 2006 Gina Brescianini
- 2005 Lana Jones
- 2004 Amber Scott
- 2003 Matthew Lawrence

=== People's Choice Award ===
- 2023 Isobelle Dashwood
- 2022 Lilly Maskery
- 2020/21 Nathan Brook
- 2019 Marcus Morelli
- 2018 Jade Wood
- 2017 Jake Mangakahia
- 2016 Jarryd Madden
- 2015 Marcus Morelli
- 2014 Imogen Chapman
- 2013 Benedicte Bemet
- 2012 Jake Mangakahia
- 2011 Chengwu Guo
- 2010 Amy Harris
- 2009 Stephanie Williams
- 2008 Amy Harris
- 2007 Luke Ingham
- 2006 Madeleine Eastoe
- 2005 Danielle Rowe
- 2004 Amber Scott
- 2003 Danielle Rowe

== Nominees ==
The nominees for these awards were, until 2015, announced in the first three months of the year.

The 2019 nominees were Isobelle Dashwood, Cristiano Martino, Marcus Morelli, Jill Ogai, Sharni Spencer and Yichuan Wang.

The 2018 nominees were Nathan Brook, Corey Herbert, Brodie James, Rina Nemoto, Jade Wood and Lucien Xu.

The 2017 nominees were announced on 4 November 2017 at a free performance at Penrith Lakes, Sydney, with for the second year in a row, three male and three female nominees: first-timers Isobelle Dashwood, Drew Hedditch and François-Eloi Lavignac, 2012 People's Choice winner Jake Mangakahia, and 2013 nominees Sharni Spencer and Valerie Tereshchenko.

The 2016 nominees were announced on 18 August 2016 at the Australian Ballet Centre. Second-timers Jarryd Madden and Jade Wood were joined by Nicola Curry, Brodie James, Callum Linnane and Jill Ogai in the first evenly-distributed set of nominations.

The 2015 nominees were announced on 10 July 2015 at the Australian Ballet Centre in Southbank. Previous People's Choice winner Benedicte Bemet joined Ako Kondo in celebrating a second nomination, while Robyn Hendricks was nominated for a fourth time. The first-time nominees joining them were Marcus Morelli, Amanda McGuigan, and Jasmin Durham.

The 2014 nominees were announced on 7 March 2014 at a free performance at the Sidney Myer Music Bowl in Melbourne and were Dimity Azoury, Imogen Chapman, Ingrid Gow, Cristiano Martino, Rina Nemoto, and Jade Wood.

The 2013 nominees were announced on 13 February 2013 and were Benedicte Bemet, Cameron Hunter, Natasha Kusen, Christopher Rodgers-Wilson, Sharni Spencer, and Valerie Tereshchenko.

The 2012 nominees were Dimity Azoury, Calvin Hannaford, Amy Harris, Ako Kondo, Jarryd Madden and Jake Mangakahia.

The 2011 nominees were announced at a full meeting of The Australian Ballet's company and artistic staff on 15 February. They were Brett Chynoweth, Chengwu Guo, Rudy Hawkes, Robyn Hendricks, Luke Marchant and Karen Nanasca.

The 2010 nominees were Amy Harris, Ty King-Wall, Miwako Kubota, Natasha Kusen, Dana Stephensen, and Vivienne Wong (now retired).

The 2009 nominees were Juliet Burnett (now with Royal Ballet of Flanders), Robyn Hendricks (current principal artist), Andrew Killian (current principal artist), Leanne Stojmenov, Laura Tong (retired) and Stephanie Williams (corps de ballet, American Ballet Theatre).

The 2008 nominees were Tzu-Chao Chou (principal artist, Birmingham Royal Ballet), Amy Harris (current senior artist), Reiko Hombo (retired senior artist), Kevin Jackson, Ty King-Wall (current principal artist) and Andrew Wright (current soloist).

The 2007 nominees were Jane Casson, Daniel Gaudiello (left in 2016), Rudy Hawkes (retired in 2016), Robyn Hendricks (current principal artist), Luke Ingham (principal artist, San Francisco Ballet), and Leanne Stojmenov.

The 2006 nominees were Adam Bull, Annabel Bronner Reid (retired), Andrew Killian (current principal artist), Gina Brescianini (retired), Kevin Jackson (current principal artist), and Madeleine Eastoe.

The 2005 nominees were Marc Cassidy (retired), Gaylene Cummerfield (retired principal artist, Birmingham Royal Ballet), Lana Jones (current principal artist), Paul Knobloch (Ballet Master, The Australian Ballet), Danielle Rowe, and Leanne Stojmenov (current principal artist).

The 2004 nominees were Adam Bull (current principal artist), Jane Casson (Principal Teacher, City Adult Ballet), Craig Cathcart (company manager, Queensland Ballet), Miwako Kubota (retired senior artist), Rachel Rawlins (retired principal artist), and Amber Scott (current principal artist).

The inaugural nominees, in 2003, were Olivia Bell (retired principal artist), Annabel Bronner Reid, Madeleine Eastoe (retired principal artist), Tim Harbour (retired, now choreographer), Matthew Lawrence (retired, former principal artist Queensland Ballet, Birmingham Royal Ballet, The Australian Ballet), and Danielle Rowe (Nederlands Dans Theater, former principal artist The Australian Ballet, Houston Ballet).
