= Natalya Kusch =

Ukrainian ballet dancer and teacher

- Natalya Kusch, 2026
- Born: Nikopol, Ukraine
- Other names: Natalya Fichtenbaum-Kusch; Natalie Kusch; Natasha Kush
- Occupations: Ballet dancer, ballet teacher
- Spouse: Thomas Fichtenbaum (m. 2023)

Natalya Kusch (also known as Natalya Fichtenbaum-Kusch, Natalie Kusch and Natasha Kush) is a Ukrainian ballet dancer and ballet teacher. She has held engagements as a soloist with the Vienna State Ballet, a principal dancer with Queensland Ballet, a senior artist with the Australian Ballet, and a resident guest principal with Universal Ballet in Seoul. Her subsequent engagements included the ballet companies in Košice and Odesa.

== Early life and training ==
Kusch was born in Nikopol, Ukraine. She trained in Dnipro and continued her studies at the ballet conservatory in St. Pölten under Shida Mubaryakova. Before her engagement in Vienna, she worked at the opera and ballet theatre in Dnipropetrovsk and at theatres in Magdeburg and Cairo.

== Company engagements ==
=== Vienna State Ballet ===
From 2005 to 2013, Kusch danced with the ballet company of the Vienna State Opera and the Vienna State Ballet. She was promoted to soloist under Manuel Legris. On 26 June 2011, she performed the title role in Giselle at the Vienna State Opera. She also appeared in the filmed ballet sequences for the Vienna Philharmonic's 2011 New Year's Concert.

Her repertoire in Vienna also included George Balanchine's Rubies, Jerome Robbins' In the Night and Glass Pieces, William Forsythe's The Vertiginous Thrill of Exactitude, David Dawson's A Million Kisses to My Skin and Nils Christe's Before Nightfall.

=== Queensland Ballet ===
In 2013, Kusch joined Queensland Ballet in Brisbane as a principal dancer at the invitation of Li Cunxin. In 2014, she danced Juliet in Kenneth MacMillan's Romeo and Juliet, opposite Steven McRae. Her roles with the company also included Swanilda in Greg Horsman's Coppélia, partnered by Qi Huan. She also danced the Sugar Plum Fairy in The Nutcracker, with Hao Bin as the Prince.

=== The Australian Ballet ===
In 2015, she joined the Australian Ballet as a senior artist. In March of that year, she performed the title role in Maina Gielgud's Giselle in Melbourne, partnered by Chengwu Guo. She also danced Aurora in David McAllister's The Sleeping Beauty, including performances with Brett Chynoweth as Prince Désiré.

Her roles with the company included the Ballerina, representing Tamara Karsavina, in John Neumeier's Nijinsky. She also appeared in Twyla Tharp's In the Upper Room. In 2016, she was cast as Odette/Odile in Stephen Baynes's Swan Lake, with Andrew Killian as Siegfried.

=== Universal Ballet, Seoul ===
Kusch joined Universal Ballet in Seoul in 2017; contemporary coverage in 2018 described her position as resident guest principal. In December 2017, she was announced as a lead in the company's production of Vasily Vainonen's The Nutcracker at the Universal Art Center. For its April 2018 Giselle season, she was cast opposite Matthew Golding, a former principal dancer of The Royal Ballet.

=== Košice ===
Kusch subsequently worked with the ballet company of the State Theatre in Košice, Slovakia. During her time in Slovakia, she worked with Vladimir Malakhov, a former artistic director of the Staatsballett Berlin, and performed in his ballet productions.

She was among the dancers cast as Dorothy in Giorgio Madia's The Wizard of Oz, which premiered at the theatre on 29 November 2019.

=== Odesa ===
Kusch appeared as a guest in Odesa before joining its opera and ballet theatre in 2020. A 2021 report described her as a leading ballerina of the company. In March 2018, she danced Nikiya in La Bayadère at the theatre's festival marking Marius Petipa's bicentenary. In September of the same year, she performed Aurora in The Sleeping Beauty, partnered by Maxim Chashchegorov during the Velvet Season festival.

On 20 December 2020, she danced Masha in Serhiy Bondur's new version of The Nutcracker, with Danyil Pashchuk as the Nutcracker Prince. In 2021, she was featured in a report on the company's Swan Lake and was listed as Odette/Odile opposite Pashchuk as Siegfried for the performance on 10 October.

Kusch in Swan Lake, Odesa, 2020.

== Guest appearances and tours ==
=== Carmen ===
In 2017, Kusch toured New Zealand as a guest artist with the Royal New Zealand Ballet, dancing the title role in Roland Petit's Carmen, opposite Joseph Skelton as Don José. That year, she also performed the role at the Teatro dell'Opera di Roma and with the Rome company at the Festival de Danse de Cannes, where her partner was Michele Satriano.

On 5 June 2018, she performed the Carmen and Don José duet with Satriano at the Benois de la Danse gala on the historic stage of the Bolshoi Theatre in Moscow.

=== Galas ===
Before joining Queensland Ballet, Kusch appeared in its 2012 International Gala, dancing the Bluebird pas de deux with Yu Hui and the Le Corsaire grand pas with Daniel Gaudiello. At the Munich International Ballet School gala in 2018, she danced excerpts from Giselle with Alexandr Trusch and Medora in Le Corsaire with Alejandro Virelles as Conrad.

Kusch was announced as an international guest soloist, alongside Ivan Putrov, for the International Ballet and Dance Gala at Theater Augsburg on 11 and 12 January 2019. Later that year, she and Matthew Golding appeared together at Odesa's Classic & Modern gala during the Velvet Season festival.

In May 2022, she performed at the Dance for Peace benefit gala in Fürstenfeldbruck, Germany. The event raised approximately €22,000 for aid projects supporting Ukraine.

=== Plzeň ===
Kusch made guest appearances with the ballet company of the J. K. Tyl Theatre in Plzeň, Czech Republic. She took part in the theatre's Balet tančí republice gala in November 2018. She also danced Odette/Odile in the theatre's Swan Lake, partnered by Karel Audy. The two were also listed in those roles for the performance on 24 March 2022. In 2023, she was announced for another ballet gala at the theatre alongside Stuttgart Ballet soloist Ciro Ernesto Mansilla.

=== Other guest appearances and tours ===
In 2019, Kusch was listed as Odette/Odile in Swan Lake with Andrey Batalov's St. Petersburg Classical Ballet at the Teatro Gran Vía in Madrid. The programme scheduled her performances from 23 July to 4 August, with Ievgen Lagunov as Siegfried. She has also been announced as a guest Odette/Odile at the National Opera of Ukraine in Kyiv.

In 2023, she toured Australia and New Zealand with the Royal Czech Ballet as Aurora in The Sleeping Beauty.

== Selected repertoire ==
Her repertoire includes the following roles:

Ballet	Role	Selected company or production
Giselle	Title role	Vienna State Opera (2011); Australian Ballet (2015)
La Bayadère	Nikiya	Odesa (2018)
The Sleeping Beauty	Aurora	Australian Ballet (2015); Odesa (2018); Royal Czech Ballet tour (2023)
Swan Lake	Odette/Odile	Australian Ballet; Odesa; J. K. Tyl Theatre, Plzeň
Coppélia	Swanilda	Queensland Ballet (2014)
Romeo and Juliet	Juliet	Queensland Ballet (2014)
La Sylphide	The Sylph; Effie	Vienna State Opera
The Nutcracker	Clara	Vienna State Opera
The Nutcracker	Sugar Plum Fairy	Queensland Ballet (2014)
The Nutcracker	Masha	Odesa (2020)
Onegin (John Cranko)	Olga	Vienna State Opera
Mayerling	Crown Princess Stéphanie	Vienna State Opera
Nijinsky	The Ballerina (Tamara Karsavina)	Australian Ballet (2016)
Carmen (Roland Petit)	Title role	Royal New Zealand Ballet; Teatro dell'Opera di Roma (2017)
Le Corsaire	Medora	Munich International Ballet School gala, excerpts (2018)
The Concert (Jerome Robbins)	The Ballerina	Vienna State Opera
Suite en blanc (Serge Lifar)	La Flûte	Vienna State Opera

Kusch in Giselle, 2022.

== Teaching ==
Following the Russian invasion of Ukraine, Kusch left the country in 2022 and moved to Munich, where she taught at the Munich International Ballet School. She returned to Austria in 2023 and subsequently worked as a coach with Europaballett St. Pölten. In 2024, she coached the principal roles in the company's production of Swan Lake.

== Personal life ==
Kusch married Thomas Fichtenbaum in 2023.
