= Benedicte Bemet =

Australian Ballet Dancer

- Born: Mackay, Queensland
- Education: Australian Ballet School
- Occupation: Dancer
- Known for: Principal dancer with The Australian Ballet
- Awards: Telstra Ballet Dancer Award

Benedicte Bemet is an Australian ballet dancer. She is a principal dancer for The Australian Ballet.

== Early life and education ==
Bemet was born in Mackay, Queensland, in about 1994, the daughter of Steven and Andrée Bemet, who are both school teachers. She has one brother. She grew up on the Gold Coast, Queensland, where she learned ballet at the Ransley Ballet Centre, and then lived in Hong Kong with her family. There, she trained at the Jean M. Wong School of Ballet. She then returned to Queensland to live with her grandparents in order to apply to the Australian Ballet School, which she entered in 2008, aged 14.

== Career ==
Bemet began dancing with the Australian Ballet in 2012. She was promoted from coryphée to soloist in 2016, after having been chosen in 2015 by the then artistic director of the Australian Ballet David McAllister to take on the role of Aurora in The Sleeping Beauty. A dance reviewer commented that, "in her 40 years of "ballet-watching", [she] ha[d] not witnessed a debut like it ... it was extraordinary."

In 2017, Bemet suffered a severe tendon injury which caused her to take a year off from ballet, during which she explored psychology and read books about resilience and wellness. By September 2018, she was dancing as a soloist again, in the role of Flavia in Spartacus. A reviewer commented, "Benedicte Bemet paints a fragile yet fiercely passionate persona as Flavia, and her commitment to emotive storytelling through dance is stunning to watch." She was promoted to principal dancer in December 2019. In 2023, The Australian Ballet, with Bemet, performed at Covent Garden for the first time in 35 years. A reviewer wrote of her performance there in George Balanchine's Jewels:

"Bemet’s musicality was notable, allowing her to shade between her movements and to let the choreography breathe; she made the overlong central pas de deux into a vision of classical purity, while the third and fourth sections saw her unleash impressive but never over-showy virtuosity. This was a notable assumption of a very difficult role; while Caley is a familiar dancer one was delighted to see again, Bemet is an unfamiliar artist one longs to see again."

== Selected roles ==
Bemet's repertoire with The Australian Ballet includes:

Year	Ballet	Choreographer(s)	Role
2024	Alice’s Adventures in Wonderland	Christopher Wheeldon	Alice
2023	Swan Lake	Anne Woolliams	Odette/Odile
2023	Jewels	George Balanchine	Diamonds - Lead Couple
2023	Don Quixote	Rudolf Nureyev (after Marius Petipa)	Kitri
2023	The Dream	Frederick Ashton	Titania
2022	Romeo and Juliet	John Cranko	Juliet
2022	Harlequinade	Marius Petipa and Alexei Ratmansky	Columbine
2022	Kunstkamer	Sol León, Paul Lightfoot, Crystal Pite and Marco Goecke	Performer
2022	Anna Karenina	Yuri Possokhov	Kitty
2020	Capriccio	François-Eloi Lavignac	Solo dancer
2019	Giselle	Maina Gielgud	Giselle
2018	Spartacus	Aram Khachaturian and Lucas Jervies	Flavia
2016	Coppélia	George Ogilvie and Peggy van Praagh	Swanilda
2016	In the Middle, Somewhat Elevated	William Forsythe	Performer
2016	Grand pas classique	Viktor Gvosky	Performer
2016	DGV©: Danse à grande vitesse	Christopher Wheeldon	"Second Region" Pas de deux
2016	Symphony in C	George Balanchine	Third Movement Principal
2015	The Sleeping Beauty	David McAllister	Aurora
2015	The Sleeping Beauty	David McAllister	Princess Florine
2015	Giselle	Maina Gielgud	Peasant Pas de deux
2014	The Nutcracker	Peter Wright	Clara
2014	Suite en Blanc	Serge Lifar	Sérénade Variation

== Awards ==
- Telstra Ballet Dancer Award, 2015
- Green Room Award nomination for Clara in The Nutcracker, 2014
- Telstra People’s Choice Award, 2013

== Personal life ==
Bemet loves baking and cooking anything involving chocolate and has an aversion for tight fitting clothes. In order to relieve stress before shows, Bemet likes to sew pointe shoes.
