= Dana Stephensen =

Australian ballet dancer

- Born: 21 July 1985 (age 41); Brisbane, Queensland, Australia
- Occupation: Ballet dancer
- Years active: 2005–present
- Spouses: Michael Kai (divorced) Lachlan Gillespie (m. 2022)
- Children: 3
- Dancing career
- Current group: The Australian Ballet

Dana Stephensen (born 21 July 1985) is an Australian ballet dancer. She is a soloist of The Australian Ballet.

== Dance career ==
Stephensen started her dance training at the age of three in Brisbane. In 2001 she joined the Queensland Dance School of Excellence and obtained the Royal Academy of Dance Solo Seal. After becoming an Interstate Associate of The Australian Ballet School, she joined the senior school in 2002. She performed several seasons seconded to The Australian Ballet and joined full-time in 2005. She was promoted to coryphée in 2010 and soloist in 2013.

Stephensen won the Telstra Ballet Dancer Award for 2010, jointly with Ty King-Wall.

== Selected repertoire ==
- Lead Cupid in Molto Vivace, 2010
- Guardian Swan in Graeme Murphy's Swan Lake, 2008–2010
- Kitri in Don Quixote, 2010 (as Guest Artist with Australian touring company The Dancers Company)

== Other activities ==
Stephensen played an Australian Ballet dancer in the 2009 film Mao's Last Dancer.

== Personal life ==
Stephensen has a son, Jasper, born on 23 September 2015 with her former husband Michael Kai.

As of early 2020, Stephensen was engaged to Lachlan Gillespie of The Wiggles, whom she met while filming a Wiggles DVD special in December 2018. They wed in late November 2022.

On 11 September 2020, Stephensen and Gillespie announced via Instagram the arrival of their newborn twin daughters, Lulu and Lottie.

== Awards ==
- Telstra Ballet Dancer Award 2010
- Khitercs Scholarship, 2008
- James and Pamela Mills Scholarship, 2004
- Graeme Murphy Award for Excellence in Contemporary Dance, 2003
