= Stephanie Williams (dancer) =

Australian ballet dancer (born 1987 or 1988)

- Born: 1987 or 1988 (age 38–39); Newcastle, New South Wales
- Occupation: ballet dancer
- Employer: American Ballet Theatre

Stephanie Williams (born in Newcastle, New South Wales) is an Australian ballet dancer, a member of the corps de ballet of the American Ballet Theatre.

== Dance career ==
Stephanie Williams started learning ballet with the Marie Walton-Mahon (founder & creator of Progressing Ballet Technique) Dance Academy in Newcastle at the age of 8. She joined The Australian Ballet School and performed the double rôle of Odette and Odile in Swan Lake at her graduation performance in 2006. She then joined The Australian Ballet and was promoted to coryphée. She was a guest artist with Morphoses/The Wheeldon Company at the Sydney Festival in 2009.

She won both the Telstra Ballet Dancer Award and Telstra People's Choice Award for 2009, the second dancer to win both awards.

Williams joined the corps de ballet of the Dutch National Ballet in 2011.

In January 2012 she joined American Ballet Theatre as a member of the corps de ballet.

== Selected repertoire ==
- Odette and Odile in Graeme Murphy's Swan Lake, 2006
- Idée fixe in Krzysztof Pastor's Symphonie fantastique
- Maiden in Alexei Ratmansky's Firebird, world première 2012

== Awards ==
- Gold Medal, 10th Asian Pacific International Ballet Competition in Tokyo, 2005
- Telstra Ballet Dancer Award and People's Choice Award, 2009
