= Ako Kondo =

Japanese ballet dancer

Ako Kondo 近藤亜香
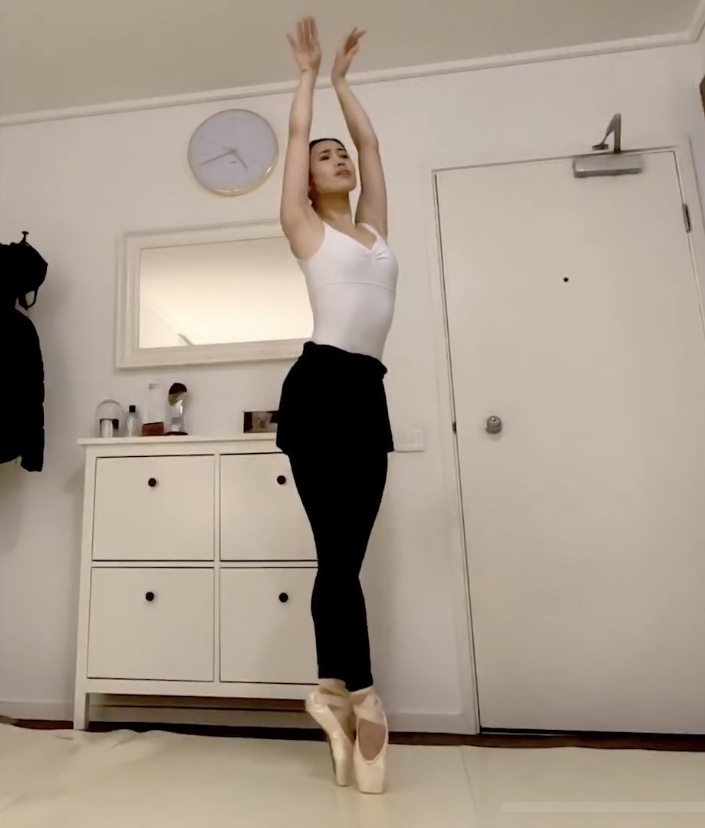
- Ako Kondo dances for Swans for Relief in May 2020
- Born: 1991 (age 34–35); Nagoya, Japan
- Occupation: Ballet dancer
- Spouse: Chengwu Guo (m. 2019)
- Career
- Current group: The Australian Ballet
- Dances: Ballet

Ako Kondo (近藤亜香, Kondo Ako, born 1991) is a Japanese ballet dancer. She is a principal artist at The Australian Ballet.

== Early life ==
Kondo was born in Nagoya, Japan. She began ballet classes when she was three. She attended normal school during the day and took ballet classes after school. In 2007, when she was 16, she was awarded a scholarship at Youth America Grand Prix and relocated to Australia to train The Australian Ballet School, at the time she didn't speak English.

== Career ==
Kondo toured The Dancers Company in 2008. In 2010, Kondo joined The Australian Ballet. In 2015, at age 24, she was promoted to Principal Artist on stage following her debut as the title role in Giselle. In 2013, while she was a coryphée, she made her debut as Kitri in Don Quixote. She is the first Japanese Principal Artist of the company. She has danced roles such as the title role in Cinderella and Princess Aurora in The Sleeping Beauty. Kondo had made guest appearances in China and Japan.

On Giselle, Bachtrack praised Kondo's performance and wrote "it is rare to see a Giselle so able to combine the technical assurance of a dancer of Kondo’s experience with such fresh innocence of character. Even her musicality was youthful, lacing every sequence with fresh and surprising emotion." Reviewing Kondo's performance in Stanton Welch's Sylvia, The Sydney Morning Herald noted that Kondo "creates a strong personality and dances exquisitely."

In 2020, Kondo participated in Misty Copeland's fundraiser, Swans for Relief, by dancing The Swan, in light of the impacts of the COVID-19 coronavirus pandemic on the dance community. The fund will go to participating dancers' companies and other related relief funds.

== Selected repertoire ==
- Sylvia in Stanton Welch's Sylvia
- Alice in Alice's Adventures in Wonderland
- Infra
- Aurora in The Sleeping Beauty
- Swanilda in Coppélia

- Odette/Odile in Swan Lake
- Cinderella in Cinderella
- Giselle in Giselle
- Lescaut's Manon
- Kitri in Don Quixote

== Personal life ==
In 2019, Kondo and Chengwu Guo, also a Principal Artist as the Australian Ballet, married in Japan. Kondo is currently learning Chinese.
