= Stephanie Williams =

Stephanie Williams may refer to:

- Stephanie Williams (Miss District of Columbia) (born 1987), Miss District of Columbia, 2010
- Stephanie Williams (dancer), Australian ballet dancer
- Stephanie Williams (Welsh footballer) (born 1992), Welsh footballer
- Stephanie Williams (Australian footballer) (born 2002), Australian rules footballer
- Stephanie Williams (comics), American comic book writer
- Stephanie E. Williams (born 1957), actress
- Stephanie Turco Williams, United States diplomat specialising in the Arab world
