= David Hallberg =

American classical ballet dancer (born 1982)

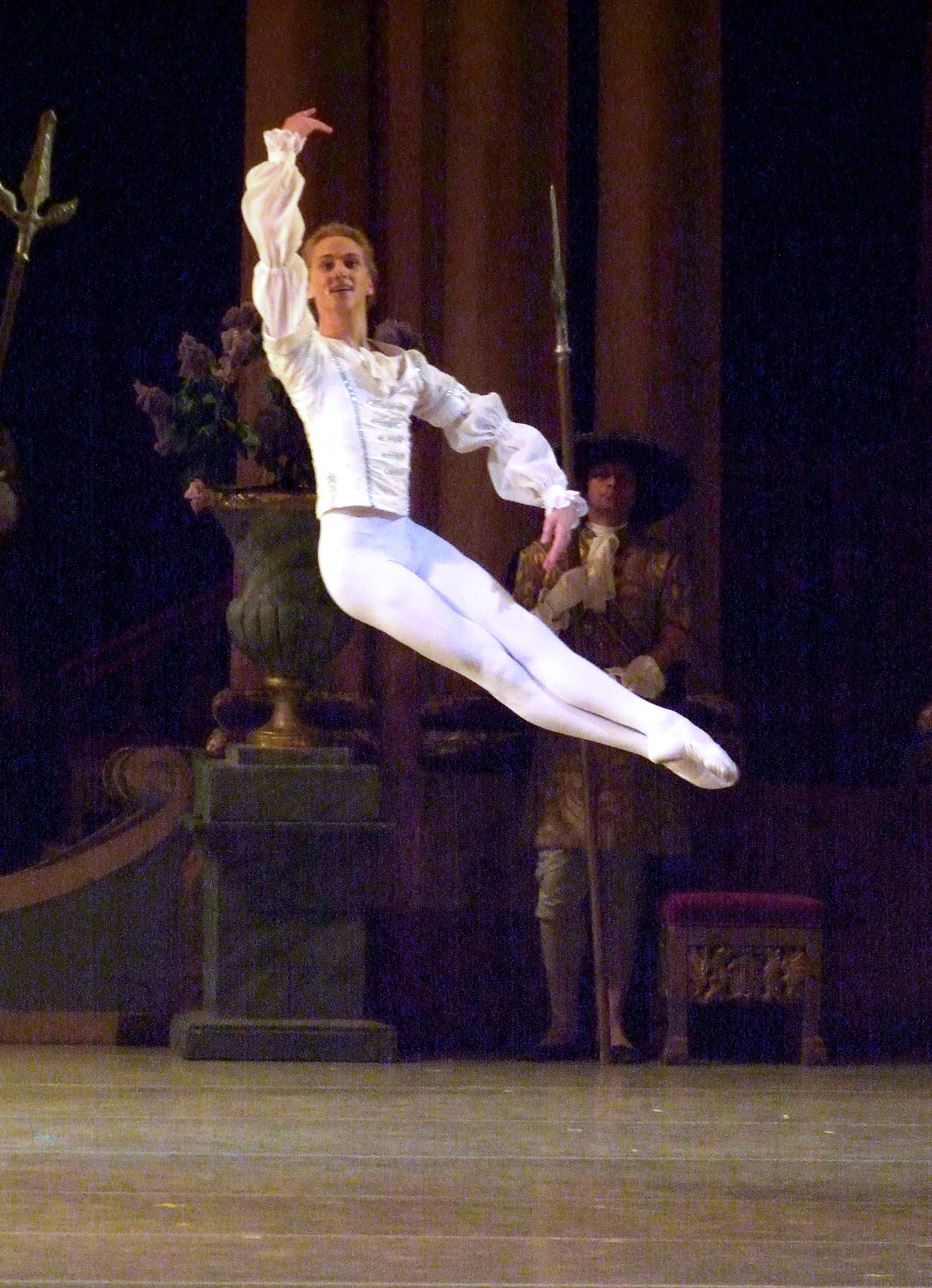
- Hallberg in The Sleeping Beauty, 2010
- Born: May 18, 1982 (age 44); Rapid City, South Dakota, U.S.
- Occupation: Ballet dancer
- Dancing career
- Current group: American Ballet Theatre; The Australian Ballet
- Website: davidhallberg.com

David Hallberg (born May 18, 1982) is an American classical ballet dancer. He was a principal dancer with American Ballet Theatre and resident guest artist at The Australian Ballet, as well as a principal dancer with the Bolshoi Ballet. In 2021, Hallberg became the artistic director of The Australian Ballet.

== Early life ==
Hallberg was born in Rapid City, South Dakota, and grew up in Phoenix, Arizona. He was inspired to dance when he saw a Fred Astaire film in the family living room. With his family's support, he trained at the Ballet Arizona School under the direction of Kee Juan Han. In 1999 he studied for one year at the Paris Opera Ballet School, then joined American Ballet Theatre's Studio Company in 2001.

== Career ==
Hallberg joined American Ballet Theatre's (ABT) corps de ballet in 2001, was promoted to soloist in 2004, then principal in 2006. He has been a guest artist with many different companies around the world, including the Mariinsky Ballet, the Paris Opera Ballet, Royal Swedish Ballet, The Australian Ballet, Kyiv Ballet in Ukraine, and Ballet Estable del Teatro Colón in Buenos Aires. He has also performed at galas around the world from Japan to the Bolshoi Ballet in Moscow. In 2010, Hallberg won the Prix Benois de la Danse for his portrayal of Count Albrecht in Giselle.

In 2011 Hallberg became the first American to become a principal dancer with the Bolshoi Ballet. Hallberg was invited by Sergei Filin, Bolshoi Ballet's artistic director to join as either a guest artist or principal. His decision to join was made, in part, to dance with ballerina Natalia Osipova with whom he had danced previously. However, owing to a severe ankle injury, he did not perform with the Bolshoi after July 2014, and the association ended formally in 2017.

During two years off stage due to complications recovering from surgery on his left foot, Hallberg spent 15 months working with The Australian Ballet's physiotherapy and rehabilitation team, building a relationship with the company that resulted in his being named Resident Guest Artist. He finally returned to the stage in a role début, that of Franz in Coppélia, with The Australian Ballet and partnered with Amber Scott in December 2016.

In 2015, Halberg collaborated with the artist Francesco Vezzoli creating the performance Fortuna Desperata for Performa 15.

Hallberg starred in the 2017 Nike campaign, "I, David", directed by Niclas Gillis with set design by James Casebere.

Hallberg published a memoir, A Body of Work: Dancing to the Edge and Back, with the Touchstone imprint of Simon & Schuster in November 2017.

Hallberg established the David Hallberg Scholarship to mentor aspiring male dancers at American Ballet Theatre's Studio Company and Ballet Arizona. Hallberg has directed ABT Incubator, a two-week choreographic program at Ballet Theater, since 2018.

In March 2020 The Australian Ballet announced Hallberg as the new artistic director, succeeding David McAllister. He assumed the position in January 2021. Hallberg's final tour as a dancer was cancelled due to the COVID-19 pandemic. He was set to have "a proper farewell performance" during ABT's 2021 Metropolitan Opera House season.

== Selected repertoire ==
- The Boy in Afternoon of a Faun
- The title role in Apollo
- Solor in La Bayadère
- The Prince in Frederick Ashton's Cinderella
- Her Prince Charming in James Kudelka's Cinderella
- Conrad in Le Corsaire
- Basilio and Espada in Don Quixote
- Oberon in The Dream
- Albrecht in Giselle
- Pierrot in Harlequinade
- Des Grieux in Lady of the Camellias
- Des Grieux in Manon
- Beliaev in A Month in the Country
- The Cavalier in Kevin McKenzie's The Nutcracker
- The title role in Onegin
- Other Dances
- Bernard and Jean de Brienne in Raymonda
- Romeo, Paris and Benvolio in Romeo and Juliet
- Prince Désiré in The Sleeping Beauty
- Prince Siegfried, von Rothbart (Act III) and Benno in Swan Lake
- James in La Sylphide
- Aminta in Sylvia
- The first movement in Symphony in C
- Tchaikovsky Pas de Deux
- Les Sylphides
- Symphonic Variations
- Theme and Variations
- Drink to Me Only With Thine Eyes
- Petite Mort

=== Created roles ===
- Robert Hill's Dorian
- Kaschei in Alexei Ratmansky's The Firebird
- The Nutcracker Prince in Ratmansky's The Nutcracker
- Olga's Fiancé in On the Dnieper
- Prince Coffee in Whipped Cream
- Chamber Symphony
- I Feel the Earth Move
- Rabbit and Rogue
- Thirteen Diversions
- Citizen
