= Faye Leung (dancer) =

Chinese ballet dancer (born 1979)

- 梁菲
- Born: 18 March 1979 (age 46); Shanghai
- Education: Shanghai Ballet School
- Occupation(s): Ballet dancer, model
- Years active: 1996–present
- Employer: Hong Kong Ballet (until 2008)
- Title: Principal dancer
- Successor: Margarita Demjanoka
- Awards: First Prize and Special Award at Shanghai International Ballet Competition (Teenage Group) 1995 "Best PN Look" and "Colour 18 Girls" at "Marie Claire Best Model Competition"; RTHK's The best 10 of the Artists 2006 and 2008

Faye Leung (Chinese: 梁菲; born 18 March 1979) is the former senior principal dancer of the Hong Kong Ballet (HKB), from 1996 to 2008. She speaks fluent English, Cantonese and Mandarin. She appeared in many leading roles, in such classic works as Swan Lake, The Nutcracker, Cinderella, Romeo and Juliet and The Merry Widow.

== Biography ==
Faye was born in Shanghai as the only child of a writer and a former businesswoman. She started dancing at the age of four years and was soon recruited by the Shanghai Junior Academy of Arts for further ballet training. At ten, she joined and trained at the Shanghai Ballet School. In 1995, Faye won a special award and First Prize in the Shanghai International Ballet Competition (Teenage Group) as well as a scholarship acknowledging her outstanding ballet technique, unique presentation style and musical talent. She represented China on tours to North Korea and the United States.

In 1999, she entered the "Marie Claire Best Model Competition", and won the "Best PN Look" and "Colour 18 Girls" awards. And in 2002 she was listed in Eve Magazine as one of "Eve's 10 Most Envied Women".

== Career ==
Faye joined the Hong Kong Ballet in October 1996, after completing her scholarship in 1995–1996, and was promoted to principal dancer in the 2001 season and senior principal in 2005.

Faye has danced all the leads in the classics, including Swan Lake, The Sleeping Beauty, Giselle, The Nutcracker and Romeo and Juliet. A variety of choreographers have also created roles specially for her, such as Princess Jade in Legend of the Great Archer, Valeria in Spartacus (Irek Mukhamadov), Lady White in The White Snake (Domy Reiter-Soffer) and roles in Tango Ballet Tango (Stephen Jefferies), Turandot (Natalie Weir), and Dreams of Tenderness and Solitude (David Allan).

In 2004, she was invited to perform at the Shanghai International Ballet Competition and the International Ballet Festival of Miami. In 2005, she was nominated for the Prix Benois de la Danse for her characterization of Princess Jade in Legend of the Great Archer and performed The Nutcracker pas de deux at the Gala performance at the Bolshoi Theatre in Moscow. In August 2005, she danced at the Ballet Festival in Vail, Colorado.

=== 2009 dismissal from Hong Kong Ballet ===
Leung was dismissed from the Hong Kong Ballet with immediate effect on the evening of Friday 23 January 2009. She was in rehearsal for the "All Bach" mixed bill programme which was to be held in three weeks at the Hong Kong Arts Festival, and which marked HKB's 30th anniversary. She was advised of the dismissal by board member Linda Fung, who said it was a board decision. When she asked why she was being dismissed, Leung says Fung told her that the board felt she and the company were "going in different directions". Leung, who has said she has "done nothing wrong" then retracted a termination agreement she feels was signed under duress, and is asking for a proper explanation of her dismissal. After the dismissal, Leung broke her usual silence and became more open to media attention. In its January 2010 issue, local cultural magazine Muse published an in-depth interview with Leung regarding this difficult period in her career.

=== Career after the Hong Kong Ballet ===
In August 2009, Leung appeared as guest artist in HKB's Cinderella as a "farewell performance". In September 2009, she appeared in a music video for the new single "1+1" of local singer Jonathan Wong Chee Hynn (王梓軒).

As of 2011, she is the lead actress in The House of Dancing Water, a water-based show in City of Dreams, Macau, directed by Franco Dragone (Cirque du Soleil, Celine Dion: A New Day). The show includes high-caliber acrobats from all over the world. Leung plays a princess who is captured by an "Evil Queen" character.
