= Lana Jones =

Australian ballet dancer

- Born: 1982 or 1983 (age 42–43); Coffs Harbour, Australia
- Occupation: ballet dancer
- Years active: 2002-2019
- Spouse: Daniel Gaudiello
- Children: 1
- Career
- Former groups: The Australian Ballet
- Dances: Ballet

Lana Jones is an Australian retired ballet dancer. She was a principal dancer with The Australian Ballet, and danced with the company for 16 years.

== Early life and training ==
Jones was born in Coffs Harbour, but soon relocated to Canberra. She started her ballet training at the Canberra Youth Ballet School, where her principal trainer was Lorraine Bennett. Lana competed in the Genée Awards in London at the end of 1998, gaining a silver medal, In 1999, she relocated to Melbourne to train at the Australian Ballet School and graduated in 2002.

== Career ==
Jones joined The Australian Ballet in 2002. She was named to coryphée in 2005, and principal artist in 2005. During her time at the company, she has danced Princess Aurora in The Sleeping Beauty, the title role in Cinderella and the title role in The Firebird.

Outside of The Australian Ballet, she made guest appearances in different companies, including galas of Northern Ballet, Singapore Dance Theatre and West Australian Ballet, as well as in Hong Kong Ballet's Rubies.

Jones retired from the Australian Ballet in 2019.

== Post-dance career ==
After her retirement, Jones retrained as a midwife.

== Selected repertoire ==
- The Firebird in The Firebird
- Cinderella in Alexei Ratmansky's Cinderella
- Kitri in Rudolf Nureyev's Don Quixote
- Odette/Odile in Stephen Baynes’ Swan Lake
- Manon in Kenneth MacMillan's Manon
- Giselle in Maina Gielgud's Giselle
- Odette and Baroness von Rothbart in Graeme Murphy's Swan Lake
- Aurora in David McAllister's The Sleeping Beauty
- Pas de deux from After the Rain
- Apollo

== Awards ==
- Lissa Black Scholarship 2010
- Khitercs Hirai Foundation Scholarship 2009
- Australian Dance Award for outstanding performance by a female dancer in The Firebird 2009
- Green Room Award for best female dancer in The Firebird 2009
- Helpmann Award for best female dancer in The Firebird 2009
- Helpmann Award for best female dancer in Forgotten Land 2006
- Freda May Irving Scholarship 2006

== Personal life ==
Jones is married to fellow Australian Ballet principal artist Daniel Gaudiello. They have a son and two dogs. Outside of ballet, Jones enjoy photography and jet skiing.
