= Kusch =

Kusch is a German surname. Notable people with the surname include:

- Carsten Kusch (born 1967), German water polo player
- Frank Kusch (born 1959), American historian
- Garret Kusch (born 1973), Canadian soccer player
- Marius Kusch (born 1993), German swimmer
- Martin Kusch (born 1959), German philosopher
- Matthias Kusch, American politician
- Natalya Kusch, Ukrainian ballet dancer
- Oskar Kusch (1918–1944), German U-boat commander
- Polykarp Kusch (1911–1993), German-American physicist
- Uli Kusch (born 1967), German drummer
- Walter Kusch (born 1954), German swimmer

== See also ==
- Petra Kusch-Lück (born 1948), German singer
