= Faye Leung =

Faye Leung may refer to:

- Faye Leung (dancer) (born 1979) from Hong Kong
- Faye Leung (businesswoman) from Canada
