= Ty King-Wall =

- Born: 1986 (age 39–40); Waihi, New Zealand
- Occupation: Artistic Director
- Employer: Royal New Zealand Ballet
- Spouse: Amber Scott

Ty King-Wall is a New Zealand ballet dancer, an ex principal dancer with The Australian Ballet and current Artistic Director of the Royal New Zealand Ballet.

== Dance career ==
King-Wall was born in Waihi, New Zealand. He started dancing aged seven and trained at the Dance Education Centre, Tauranga. He was a Junior Associate of the New Zealand School of Dance before joining the Australian Ballet School at the age of 16.

After graduating Dux with Honours he joined The Australian Ballet in 2006 becoming soloist in 2010, senior artist in 2011 and principal artist in 2013. King-Wall won the Telstra Ballet Dancer Award in 2010. He retired from dancing in 2022, became the Dancers' Director on the Board of the Australian Ballet and a classical teacher at the Australian Ballet School. Whilst dancing he also earned a Bachelor of Arts from Massey University in Classical Studies and Psychology, and holds a Master of Arts (Distinction) from the University of Melbourne in Arts and Cultural Management.

In 2023, King-Wall was appointed the Artistic Director of the Royal New Zealand Ballet.

He is married to Amber Scott, also an ex principal dancer with the Australian Ballet. They have two daughters.

== Selected repertoire ==
- Ceyx in Tim Harbour's Halcyon (2006) (Harbour created the role on King-Wall)
- Prince Florimund in Stanton Welch's The Sleeping Beauty (2009)
- Scuola di Basllo Alexei Ratmansky (2009)
- The Prince in Peter Wright's The Nutcracker (2010)
- Octavian in Graeme Murphy's The Silver Rose (2010)
- Lensky in John Cranko's Onegin (2012)
- Prince Siegfried in Stephen Baynes' Swan Lake (2012)
- Principal Man in Harald Lander's Études (2012)
- Basilio in Rudolf Nureyev's Don Quixote (2013)
- Solor in Stanton Welch's La Bayadère (2014)
- Albrecht in Maina Gielgud's Giselle (2015)
- Prince Dēsirē in David McAllister's Sleeping Beauty (2015)
- Knave in Christopher Wheeldon's Alice's Adventures in Wonderland (2017)
- Crassus in Lucas Jervies' Spartacus (2018)
- Vronsky in Yuri Possokhov Anna Karenina (2022)

== Dance awards ==
- PACANZ Young Performer of the Year Award, 2002
- Silver Medal, Asia Pacific International Ballet Competition, 2005
- Lissa Black scholarship, 2009
- Telstra Ballet Dancer Award, 2010 (also nominee in 2008)
