= Daniel Gaudiello =

Australian ballet dancer (born 1982)

- Born: 18 October 1982 (age 44); Brisbane, Australia
- Occupation: Ballet dancer
- Employer: The Australian Ballet
- Spouse: Lana Jones
- Children: 1
- Awards: Telstra Ballet Dancer Award (2007)

Daniel Gaudiello (born 1982) is an Australian ballet dancer. He performed with The Australian Ballet from 2004 until his retirement as a principal artist in March 2016 to dance and teach as a freelancer.

== Dance career ==
Daniel Gaudiello began dance lessons aged six, studying at the Johnny Young Talent School and the Promenade Dance Studio in Brisbane. He then attended The Australian Ballet School during which time he was an exchange student with the National Ballet School of Canada and the School of American Ballet. He joined The Australian Ballet in 2004 and was promoted to soloist in 2007. He was promoted to principal artist in 2010, at the same time as his wife Lana Jones.

He won the Telstra Ballet Dancer Award for 2007 and was guest artist with the English National Ballet for performances of Le Spectre de la Rose in London and Barcelona, 2009.

Since leaving The Australian Ballet, Gaudiello has performed as guest artist with the Royal New Zealand Ballet, dancing Count Albrecht in Giselle in 2016 and Don José in Carmen in 2017.

== Selected repertoire ==
- Des Grieux and Lescaut in Kenneth MacMillan's Manon, 2014 and 2008
- Petrouchka in Petrouchka, 2009
- Franz in Coppélia, 2010
- Basilio in Don Quixote, 2010
- Camille in Ronald Hynd's The Merry Widow, 2011
- Romeo and Mercutio in Graeme Murphy's Romeo and Juliet, 2011
- Red Knight in Ninette de Valois' Checkmate, 2011
- Lensky in John Cranko's Onegin, 2012
- Albrecht in Giselle, Queensland Ballet, 2013
- The Prince in Alexei Ratmansky's Cinderella, 2013
- Prince Désiré in David McAllister's Sleeping Beauty, 2015

== Choreography ==
- Tristan and Isolde for Bodytorque.Muses, 2011
- South of Eden for Bodytorque.a la Mode, 2010

== Awards ==
- Australian Dance Awards, Outstanding Performance by a Male Dancer, 2011 for Franz in Coppelia
- Telstra Ballet Dancer Award, 2007
