= Grahame Garner =

Australian photographer and political activist

Grahame Garner (1928–2015) was an Australian photographer and political activist for peace in Brisbane, Queensland.

Grahame John Garner was a marine engineer in the merchant navy during the 1940s and 1950s, before becoming a fitter and turner for the Brisbane tramways.

== Photographic career and political activism ==
Garner took up photography as a hobby forming a Tramways Photographic Society with colleague, Ross Callcott. Their photographs attracted the attention of the Queensland Police's Special Branch, as some of their photographs of Brisbane trams were sent to the Soviet Union as part of the Australian Soviet Friendship Society of which Garner was a member. He organised the last tram ride through Brisbane to celebrate the passing of the tram network.

Garner was an active amateur photographer and amassed a huge collection of photographs of subjects ranging from his dogs, trams in Brisbane and political marches during the 1960s. He submitted photographs to the Queensland Guardian, the newspaper of the Communist Party of Australia. He took many photographs of the Vietnam Moratorium marches of Brisbane in 1970 and other student protests between 1963 and 1971.

He had an interest in ballet and took many photographs of the visiting Bolshoi Ballet and Moscow Circus in Brisbane, as well as over 900 photographs of the Lisner Ballet Academy, which would later become the Queensland Ballet.

After his retirement he moved to the Nambour area of Queensland where he continued his campaigns opposing high rise growth along the Sunshine Coast and stood for council election. His house and camera was destroyed by fire, although his photographic negative collection survived.

Many of these photographs are now held in the University of Queensland Fryer Library and National Library of Australia collections.

He and his wife, Esme were awarded the Eureka Australia Day Award in 2011 for their lifelong political activity.
