= Greg Horsman =

Australian ballet choreographer and former dancer

- Born: 1963 (age 62–63); Victoria, Australia
- Years active: 1982–present
- Career
- Current group: West Australian Ballet
- Former groups: Australian Ballet; English National Ballet; Royal New Zealand Ballet; Queensland Ballet

Greg Horsman is an Australian ballet choreographer, teacher, and retired dancer. In 2022, Dance Magazine Australia described him as "formerly one of the Australian Ballet's most poetic and classical of principal artists." He and his then-wife Lisa Pavane were a popular partnership during the 1980s and early 1990s, with the Washington Post referring to their "conspicuously poised, elegant dancing" and the New York Times calling them "two perfectly trained and appealing first-class dancers" during a performance of Giselle. Horsman was Acting Artistic Director Queensland Ballet from July 2024- February 2025. Horsman has been Assistant Artistic Director Queensland Ballet since 2023 and was previously the Chief Ballet Master and Director of Artistic Operations for the Queensland Ballet since 2013. Horsman has been a Rehearsal Director with the West Australian Ballet since 2026.

== Early life and education ==
Horsman was born in Geelong, Victoria, Australia in 1963. At age 12, he saw Rudolph Nureyev and the London Festival Ballet perform The Sleeping Beauty in Melbourne. He was already studying ballet under Peter Dickinson at that time but credits that moment as when he decided to commit his life to ballet. He attended Victorian College of the Arts Secondary School, where he had the opportunity to dance as a guest artist with the Philippine Ballet Theatre and the North Queensland Ballet. He then attended the Victorian College of the Arts and studied under Anne Woolliams.

== Career ==
Horsman joined the Australian Ballet in 1982 and was promoted to principal artist in 1987. During this time, he was a guest artist with the Kirov Ballet and the Boston Ballet and was part of Rudolph Nureyev's farewell tour. Reported disagreements with artistic director Maina Gielgud saw Horsman and his then-wife, principal artist Lisa Pavane, leaving the company in 1994. They left Australia and joined the English National Ballet.

London's Central School of Ballet appointed Horsman as artistic director in 1998 and he officially retired from dancing in 1999., He became ballet master at the Northern Ballet Theatre in Leeds in 2001 then rejoined the English National Ballet as a ballet master and répétiteur in 2003. In 2006, he returned to Oceania to be a ballet master at the Royal New Zealand Ballet. He spent seven years there and choreographed his first full-length ballet: The Sleeping Beauty. In 2013, Li Cunxin, the new artistic director of the Queensland Ballet, appointed him as ballet master.

Throughout his career, he has been a guest principal artist, ballet master, and teacher with the Royal Danish Ballet, the Tokyo Ballet, the Houston Ballet, the Scottish Ballet, the Birmingham Royal Ballet, La Scala Ballet, and the Staatballett Berlin. He performed the Sleeping Beauty at the Mariinsky Theatre in Saint Petersburg, Russia, where the ballet was premiered in 1890. In 1991, he and Miranda Coney won a Mo Award for "dance performance of the year." He won a Green Room Award for Leading Male Dancer in 1992 in recognition of his performance in Romeo and Juliet.

== Personal life ==
Horsman was married to Lisa Pavane, his dance partner of many years. They have a daughter, Cassandra, and separated in 1998. Pavane was the Director of the Australian Ballet School from 2015 until 2024 and has since remarried.

== Selected works ==
=== As a dancer ===
- 1986: Études. Maina Gielgud, Australian Ballet.
- 1990: Giselle as Albrecht. Maina Gielgud, Australian Ballet.
- 1992: The Nutcracker as the Nutcracker Prince. Australian Ballet.
- 1994: Swan Lake. Australian Ballet.
- 1995: Romeo and Juliet as Mercutio. Rudolf Nureyev, English National Ballet.
- 1996: Cinderella as the Prince. Michael Corder, English National Ballet.
- 2000: Alice's Adventures in Wonderland as the Mad Hatter. Derek Deane, English National Ballet.
- 2015: La Sylphide as Madge. Li Cunxin, Queensland Ballet.

=== As a choreographer ===
- 2013: Verdi Variations Queensland Ballet.
- 2014: Coppélia at the Queensland Performing Arts Centre (QPAC). Queensland Ballet.
- 2015: The Sleeping Beauty at the QPAC. Queensland Ballet.
- 2017: Glass Concerto at the QPAC. Queensland Ballet.
- 2018: La Bayadère at the QPAC. Queensland Ballet.
- 2021: The Sleeping Beauty at the Lyric Theatre, Brisbane. Queensland Ballet.
- 2022: A Rhapsody in Motion at the Talbot Theatre. Queensland Ballet.
- 2022: Peter and the Wolf at the Thomas Dixon Centre. Queensland Ballet.
