= Kevin Jackson (dancer) =

Australian ballet dancer (born 1984)

- Born: 1984 (age 40–41); Perth, Western Australia
- Occupation: Ballet dancer
- Employer: The Australian Ballet

Kevin Jackson (born 1984) is an Australian ballet dancer and choreographer, a principal artist with The Australian Ballet.

== Biography ==
Born in Perth, Jackson commenced his dance training at the age of seven with the Shirley Farrell Academy of Dance. He started training at The Australian Ballet School at age 15. In 2002 he graduated from The Australian Ballet School; he joined The Australian Ballet in 2003 and was promoted to principal artist in 2010. In his time with the company, he has performed many lead roles in both classical and contemporary works by choreographers including John Neumeier, Alexei Ratmansky, Wayne McGregor, Jiří Kylián and Graeme Murphy.

In 2014, Jackson became the second Australian Ballet dancer (after Steven Heathcote) to make a guest appearance with the American Ballet Theatre, as Des Grieux in Kenneth MacMillan's Manon.

In 2016, Jackson made a guest appearance in Houston Ballet, as The Prince in Stanton Welch's The Nutcracker.

Jackson holds a Vocational Graduate Diploma in Elite Dance Instruction from The Australian Ballet School.

== Selected repertoire ==
- George Balanchine's Apollo, 2007
- Jerome Robbins’ A Suite of Dances, 2008
- des Grieux in Kenneth MacMillan's Manon 2008
- Prince Siegfried in Graeme Murphy's Swan Lake, 2009
- Romeo in Graeme Murphy's Romeo & Juliet, 2011
- Onegin and Lenksy in John Cranko's Onegin, 2012
- Oberon in Frederick Ashton's The Dream, 2015
- Albrecht in Maina Gielgud's Giselle, 2015
- Prince Désiré in David McAllister's The Sleeping Beauty, 2015
- Vaslav Nijinsky in John Neumeier's Nijinsky, 2016

== Choreography ==
- Encomium for Bodytorque.Muses, 2011
- Enter Closer for Bodytorque.2.2, 2009

== Awards ==
- Khitercs Hirai Foundation Scholarship 2007
- Telstra Ballet Dancer Award 2008
