= Natalie Weir =

Australian contemporary dance choreographer

Natalie Weir (born 1967, Townsville, Queensland) is an Australian choreographer and former artistic director of Expressions Dance Company (now Australasian Dance Collective).

== Education and career ==
Natalie Weir began her dance training with Ann Roberts and performed with Roberts' North Queensland Ballet Company (now Dancenorth) in Townsville. She then attended Kelvin Grove College (now Queensland University of Technology) studying under Sietsma, and moved to Sietsma's Expressions Dance Company as founding member.

Weir has choreographed for the Queensland Ballet (from 1994) and The Australian Ballet (from 2000) (both as resident choreographer); and also choreographed for the American Ballet Theatre, Houston Ballet, Hong Kong Ballet, Singapore Dance Theatre, Tanzcompagnie Giessen, the Royal Ballet School, Queensland Ballet, West Australian Ballet, Queensland Ballet, the Australian Dance Theatre, Dancenorth, and Tasdance.

== Works ==
Weir has choreographed both original works and restaged a number of older works:

- Expressions Dance Company
  - Jigsaw, (1999 and 2007), choreographer: Natalie Weir
- The Australian Ballet
  - Dark Lullaby, (1998)
  - Mirror, Mirror, (2000)
  - Carmina Burana, (2001)
- Royal Academy of Dance's Genee competition 2002
  - created the contemporary male and female solos
- American Ballet Theatre
  - Jabula
  - a contribution to the Harrison Project Within You Without You
  - a solo for Ethan Stiefel, performed at the International Ballet Festival Mariinsky
  - Heaven, (2003) danced to John Adams' Harmonium, as part one of a two act work called HereAfter.
- Houston Ballet
- In a Whisper, (2000)
  - Steppenwolf, (2001)
  - The Host (2004);
- Hong Kong Ballet
  - Turandot, (2003)
  - Madama Butterfly
- Singapore Dance Theatre
  - a restaging of Dark Lullaby, (2003)
- Tanzcompagnie Giessen
  - Icarus
- Royal Ballet School
  - Jabula
  - Unwritten
- Queensland Ballet
  - Wuthering Heights
  - Petroushka
- Tasdance
  - In Her Footsteps
- West Australian Ballet
  - Lacrimosa
- Queensland Ballet
  - Orpheus.
