= Charles Lisner =

French-Australian ballet dancer

Charles Maurice Lisner OBE (1928 - 1988) was a French-Australian dancer and the founder and first artistic director of the Queensland Ballet.

== Early life ==
Charles Lisner was born in Paris in 1928 and emigrated to Australia with his parents in 1937. He started dancing late in life, first becoming a pupil of Borovansky, and later joined his company. In 1947, Lisner traveled to London where he spent time with the Sadler's Wells Ballet and dance with The Royal Ballet.

== Creation of Lisner Ballet Academy and Queensland Ballet ==
In 1953, Lisner returned to Queensland after the death of his father, and established the Lisner Ballet Academy with virtually no money. From that academy grew Lisner's privately owned company, the Lisner Ballet, which was established in 1960. The company was the first professional state company in Australia to tour regional centres throughout the country.

In 1962, the company was renamed Queensland Ballet. Lisner stepped down as Artistic Director and Chief Executive Officer of the company in 1974.

Lisner married Valerie, one of his dancers. He was an uncredited dancer in the film, The Red Shoes (1948)

He was appointed OBE in the 1976 New Year Honours.

Many photographs of the academy were taken by Grahame Garner, as a regular photographer for the Queensland Guardian newspaper. 911 negatives from his collection of the Lisner Academy were lodged with the National Library of Australia in 2009.

== Bibliography ==
- My Journey through Dance (1979) ISBN 0-7022-1429-9 (autobiography)
- The Australian Ballet: Twenty-one years (1983) ISBN 0-7022-1844-8
