= Sharni Spencer =

Sharni Spencer is an Australian ballet dancer. She is a Principal Artist at The Australian Ballet.

== Biography ==
Spencer was born in Lismore, New South Wales, Australia, and grew up in Tamworth. She started taking dance classes when she was three years old at Sally Kefts School of Dance. When she was 14 years old, the family moved to Newcastle so Spencer could attend Marie Walton Mahon Dance Academy. Spencer also studied dance at the Elmhurst Ballet School in Birmingham, England for six months. She then moved to Wellington, New Zealand and studied at the New Zealand School of Dance for two years, graduating in 2007.

In 2008 Spencer joined The Australian Ballet; in 2012 she was promoted to coryphée. In 2012 she received the Khitercs Hirai Foundation Scholarship, and spent three months rehearsing and performing Giselle with Dutch National Ballet. In 2017 she was promoted to soloist and in 2020 to senior artist, and Principal artist in 2022.

Spencer has been nominated for the Telstra Ballet Dancer Awards three times: in 2013, 2017 and 2019.
