= Anne Woolliams =

English artistic director, ballet choreographer, dancer and teacher

- Born: 3 August 1926; Folkestone, Kent, England
- Died: 8 July 1999 (aged 72); Canterbury, Kent, England
- Citizenship: British
- Occupations: Artistic director; Choreographer; Dancer; Teacher
- Years active: 1942–1995
- Spouse: Jan Stripling (m. 1963)
- Career
- Dances: Ballet

Anne Woolliams (3 August 1926 – 8 July 1999) was an English artistic director, ballet choreographer, dancer and teacher. She began studying dance at age five, performing with the Russian Opera and Ballet, the Ballet de la Jeunesse Anglaise and the St. James' Ballet and danced in the film The Red Shoes and stage musicals. Woolliams taught at Folkwang School, was appointed ballet mistress of Stuttgart Ballet, founded the John Cranko School with the director John Cranko, was the third artistic director of The Australian Ballet, was dean of dance at Victoria College of Arts, Melbourne and was artistic director of the Vienna State Ballet.

== Biography ==
=== Early life ===
Woolliams was born in the English coastal town of Folkestone, Kent, on 3 August 1926. Her father was a Group Captain in the Royal Air Force and her mother was named Mrs Frank Hawker Woolliams. She had one brother and one sister. Woolliams was taken by her mother to a ballet class at 3½ years old but her left foot had an instep. At the age of five, she began studying dance in Jerusalem. Her first teacher had studied under Mary Wigman, before learning classical ballet under Judith Espinosa, Noreen Bush, George Goncharov and Vera Volkova. Woolliams passed every major examination at the Royal Academy of Dance before turning 13.

=== Early career ===
At age 16, she made her professional debut in dance. Woolliams joined the Russian Opera and Ballet led by Jay Pomeroy, which was made up of Eastern European expatriates. Adopting the stage name Anne de Mohan, she joined Lydia Kyasht Ballet de la Jeunesse Anglaise the following year, and then danced with the small St James's Ballet, a minor Arts Council England touring group for towns lacking decent theatres, with whom she became assistant ballet mistress. There, Woolliams became friends with Peter Wright, with the duo dancing together in Alan Carter's comedy ballet The Catch. From 1948 on, she danced in the film The Red Shoes as part of a corps de ballet, and in London stage musicals, such as Brigadoon and Paint Your Wagon. However, Woolliams was more interested in teaching off-stage.

She taught in Chicago and Florence while still in her 20s, before taking charge of the ballet syllabus at the Folkwang School in Essen, Germany, for seven years between 1956 and 1963, serving as ballet mistress and character artist. There, Woolliams met Antony Tudor, who cast her in his Lilac Garden, playing the role of Caroline in the "Episode from His Past". She performed in Kurt Jooss' The Green Table, and danced in the Folkwang Tanzstudio ensemble. Deciding that she wanted to advance her career, she was invited by John Cranko, the director of Stuttgart Ballet in West Germany who had learnt of Woolliams' ability, invited her to join his institution as ballet mistress responsible for classes and rehearsals in 1963. Woolliams mounted Cranko's ballets in major European cities and choreographed ballets. She danced as Lady Capulet in Romeo and Juliet and Queen Mother in Swan Lake.

=== Directorial career ===
In 1964, she and Cranko co-founded the John Cranko School as the first in West Germany to combine general education and ballet tutoring, and she was made Cranko's assistant director by the choreographer five years later. According to John Percival, Cranko's biographer, Woolliams had ""fierce rows, after which he would say 'I hate her, loathe her", and the dancer was assigned the task of informing dancers they were no longer needed. The 1973 death of Cranko saw her, the prima ballerina Marcia Haydée and Cranko's hair Dieter Graefe formed a directorial triumvirate to keep the Stuttgart Ballet together during its tours of London, Japan and Australia. Woolliams became associate director after Cranko's death, and remained at Stuttgart until September 1976 when she was invited to become The Australian Ballet's artistic director, which she accepted.

She was The Australian Ballet's third artistic director, and began work at the company on 1 September on a two-year contract, overseeing productions of Cranko's Onegin in December 1976, Don Asker's Monkeys in a Cage as part of a triple bill in March 1977, Eugene Loring's Billy The Kid, along with revivals of The Sleeping Beauty, Sebastian, Giselle, The Merry Widow, Les Patineurs, Serenade and Raymonda (Act 3), Swan Lake. Over the course of the 1977 season, she invited Walter Bourke, Julia Cotton, Paul Saliba and Meryl Tankard to create works for the programmes Ballet ‘77 and Dance Horizons to support young choreographers. In July 1977, Woolliams offered her resignation to the board of The Australian Ballet foundation because her plans and policies caused friction with administrator Peter Bahen from 1976 to 1977. Her contract stipulated Bahen could overrule her in certain circumstances, which she believed could only occur through dialogue with the board. The resignation was not accepted by the board on the condition that a successor could be found to take over her role. She agreed to the terms and left the role in December 1978. That same year, Woolliams' book Ballet Studio was published in English after a German version had been released as Ballettsaal in 1973.

In 1978, she was invited to become the new Dean of Dance at Victoria College of Arts, Melbourne. Woolliams allowed dancers who had left The Australian Ballet to practise at the School of Dance at the college on a daily basis. She began a student touring group to represent Australia in overseas youth festivals and domestically, directed Tchaikovsky's Eugene Onegin for the Victoria State Opera in 1982, and remained associated with The Australian Ballet with revivals of Romeo and Juliet and Swan Lake. Woolliams returned to Europe in 1987. She established the Schweizerische Ballettberufsschule, a vocational ballet school in Zürich, and continued to stage the ballets of Cranko. In 1993, she was appointed artistic director of the Vienna State Ballet, presenting Wright's new production of The Sleeping Beauty. Woolliams eventually became disillusioned with ballet, and retired to Canterbury, Kent, in 1995, devoting herself to her lifelong interests of line drawing and painting in her studio.

== Personal life ==
She married the principal dancer and choreographer Jan Stripling in 1963. There were no children of the marriage. In 1999, Woolliams was diagnosed with cancer of the spine, and died from the disease on 8 July 1999 in Canterbury. On the afternoon of 30 July, a memorial service was held in her honour at St Paul's Cathedral, Melbourne.

== Personality and legacy ==
According to the press, Woolliams was instrumental in building the Stuttgart Ballet's international reputation, and Nadine Meisner of The Independent noted she was able to get dancer to understand their inner discipline, and was "very forthright" with a strong personality. Cranko said of her, "Miss Woolliams’ teaching has been of inestimable value to the Stuttgart Ballet. She is to be felt everywhere, from our prima ballerina to our kindergarten.” She won the first John Cranko Medal in 1976, and the 1978 Australian Critics' Award for Dance for her staging of Cranko's Onegin.
