= Amy Harris (dancer) =

Australian ballet dancer

- Born: 1983 or 1984 (age 42–43); Ararat, Victoria, Australia
- Education: The Australian Ballet School
- Occupation: Ballet dancer
- Spouse: Jarryd Madden
- Children: 2
- Career
- Current group: The Australian Ballet

Amy Harris (born 1983) is an Australian ballet dancer, principal artist with The Australian Ballet.

== Early life and training ==
Harris was born in Ararat, Victoria. At the age of three, she started attending ballet, jazz and tap dancing classes, and began Cecchetti training at the age of 10. In 1999, at the age of 15, Harris relocated to Melbourne to train at The Australian Ballet School.

== Career ==
Harris graduated into The Australian Ballet in 2002. She was named coryphée in 2007, soloist in 2011 and became a senior artist in 2012. Her very first principal role was Carabosse in The Sleeping Beauty. She has also performed roles such as Hannah Glawari in The Merry Widow, Romola in Nijinsky and Princess Aurora in The Sleeping Beauty. In 2018, after her performance as Tertulla in the world premiere of Lucas Jervies' Spartacus, she was promoted to principal artist on stage.

== Personal life ==
Harris is married to fellow company member Jarryd Madden. They have a daughter and a son.

== Selected repertoire ==
- The Queen of Hearts in Alice's Adventures in Wonderland
- Infra
- Aurora and the Lilac Fairy in The Sleeping Beauty
- The Stepmother in Cinderella
- Baroness von Rothbart in Graeme Murphy's Swan Lake
- Swanilda in Coppélia
- Romola in Nijinsky
- Hanna in The Merry Widow

== Awards ==
- Telstra Ballet Dancer Award 2012
- Telstra People's Choice Award 2010, 2008
