= Stephen Jefferies (dancer) =

English ballet dancer and artistic director

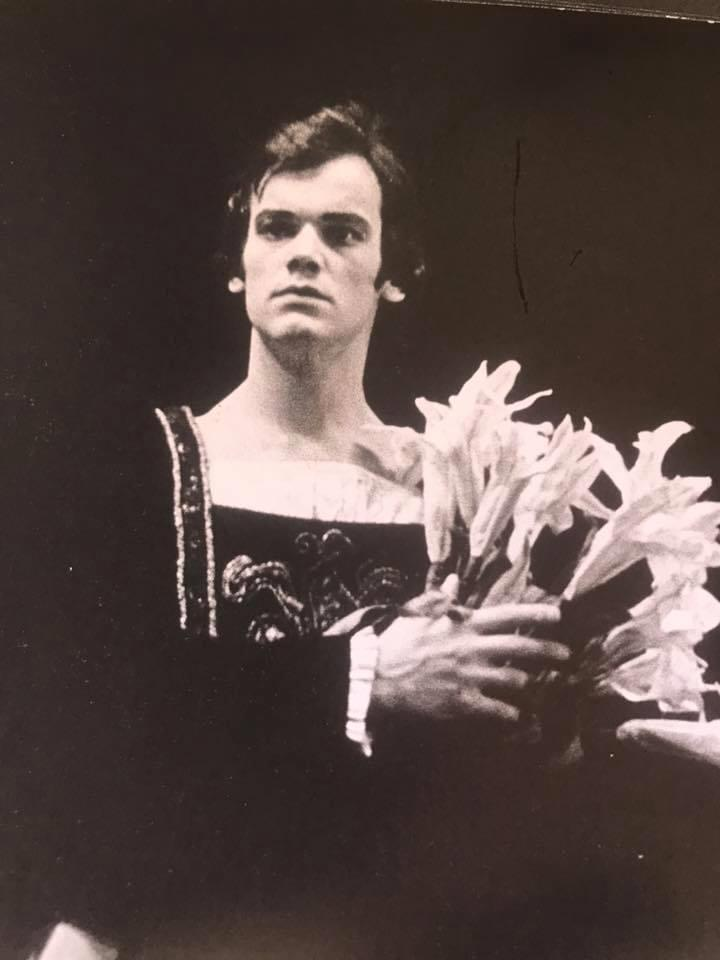
- Born: Stephen Jefferies; 24 June 1951 (age 75); Reintelm, Germany
- Occupations: Ballet Dancer and Artistic Director

Stephen Jefferies (born 24 June 1951) is a retired ballet dancer, artistic director and choreographer. He was a senior principal dancer for The Royal Ballet and The National Ballet of Canada.

Jefferies was named artistic director of the Hong Kong Ballet in 1996 and the Suzhou Ballet Theatre in 2006, before becoming a Governor of The Royal Ballet, Birmingham Royal Ballet and the Royal Ballet School in 2017.

He is also an international ballet competition judge and advisor.

He appeared in the world premiere of Minoru Miki's An Actor's Revenge (based on the film) by the English Music Theatre at the Old Vic in London, 1979, as the mime version of Yukinojo.

He married Rashna Homji in 1972 and has two children.

== Roles created ==
For The Royal Ballet

Principal dancer in Adieu (Bintley)

Principal dancer in Dances of Albion (Tetley)

Esenin in Isadora (MacMillan)

Principal dancer in L’Invitation au voyage (Corder)

Principal dancer in Consort Lessons (Bintley)

Drum Major in Different Drummer (MacMillan)

Dr. Frankenstein in Frankenstein, the Modern Prometheus (Eagling)

Hapi in The Songs of Horus (Bintley)

Brazilian Woolly Monkey in ‘Still life’ at the Penguin Café (Bintley)

Uranus in The Planets (Bintley)

Title role in Cyrano (Bintley)

The Steward in The Grand Tour (Layton)

Principal dancer in St. Thomas’ Wake (Drew)

Servant / Young Chap in O.W. (Layton)

Principal Dancer in Ballade (MacMillan)

Harlequin in The Poltroon (MacMillan)

Eitenne in Sword of Alsace (Drew)

Principal dancer in Unfamiliar Playground (Bruce)

A Brother in Shukumei (Jack Carter)

Dr. Coppélius in Coppélia (new production; Wright after Petipa, Cecchetti.)

The Ghost in El amor brujo (Wright)

Zeus in Pandora (Morse)

The Ringmaster / Jack the Ripper in Lulu (Carter)

For The National Ballet of Canada

Principal Dancer in A Party (Kudelka)

Morris in Washington Square (Kudelka)

== Guest performances ==
Romeo in John Cranko’s Romeo and Juliet, with Marcia Haydee and Natalia Makarova;

Dalal Achcar’s Something Special, with Marcia Haydee, Rio de Janeiro

Edmonton Commonwealth Festival, with Lynn Seymour in Canada

PACT Ballet in South Africa

Two World Festivals of Dance, with Lesley Collier and Alessandra Ferri, Tokyo Japan

Created principal role in Bolero (Okomota), Fukuoka, Japan

Stuttgart Ballet: Prince Albrecht in Giselle, with Yoko Morishita

Pas de deux with Carla Fracci for video & television productions "(Esmerelda)," Italy

Anna, a feature film with Silvia Seidel in Germany, where he starred as himself

Created mime role of Yukinojo in the world première of Minoru Miki’s An Actor’s Revenge at The Old Vic, London

Lead role in Andrew Lloyd-Webber’s Song and Dance at The Palace Theatre, in the West End, London

== Works Choreographed ==
Voyages for the Suzhou Science and Cultural Arts Centre, 2008

Suzie Wong (Hong Kong Ballet)

Legend of the Great Archer (Hong Kong Ballet)

The Sleeping Beauty (Hong Kong Ballet)

Tango Ballet Tango (Hong Kong Ballet)

The Nutcracker (Hong Kong Ballet)

Swan Lake (Hong Kong Ballet)

The Magic Toyshop for Granada Television, based on a novel by Angela Carter

Mes Souvenirs for a charity gala, organized by Leslie Edwards, at the London Coliseum, later taken into the London City Ballet’s repertoire

Bits and Pieces for a workshop for The National Ballet of Canada, later televised in Canada, co-choreographed with Rashna Homji

== Nominations and awards ==
Nominated for the most outstanding performance for the Laurence Olivier awards for Sons of Horos (Bintley)

Nominated for the most outstanding performance for the Laurence Olivier awards for title role in Cyrano (Bintley)

Voted dancer of the year in 1984, by Dance and Dancers Magazine

== Other ==
In 1982, he produced a charity gala at Sadlers Wells Theatre in aid of mentally handicapped children.
