= Marie Walton-Mahon =

Australian ballet dancer and teacher (born 1953)

Marie Walton-Mahon OAM
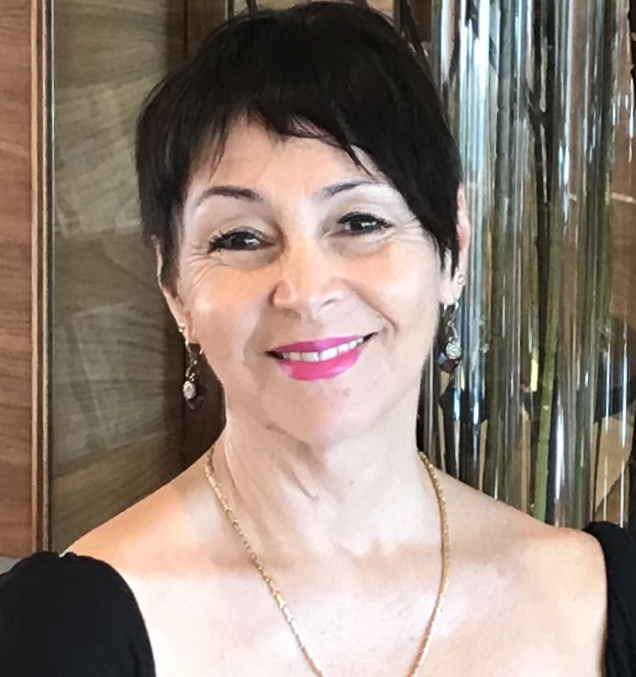
- Marie Walton-Mahon, Sydney 2019
- Born: Maitland, NSW, Australia

Marie Walton-Mahon OAM (born 14 September 1953) is an Australian ballet dancer, ballet teacher and adjudicator. She is the founder of National College of Dance, Marie Walton-Mahon Dance Academy and the founder of the Progressing Ballet Technique.

== Dancing career ==
Marie Walton-Mahon's former ballet training was in Newcastle, Australia. Upon completing her Royal Academy of Dance qualifications, including honours in advanced RAD qualifications, she received the Solo Seal award in 1970. She continued her studies in France with a scholarship at Rosella Hightower school in Cannas before joining Les Ballet de Marseille. The company toured in Europe with Maya Plisetskaya.. Later Walton-Mahon had to return to Australia ending her solo dance career prematurely in 1974, due to her father's ill health.

== Teaching career ==
Upon returning to Australia she opened her own dance academy, the Marie Walton-Mahon Dance Academy, and went on to produce many famous ballet dances with successful solo careers. Walton-Mahon remained as the artistic director/principle at the academy for almost 38 years. In early 1980s her students were able to secure places at prestigious ballet companies such as Australian Ballet Company, New York Ballet Theatre, Royal New Zealand Ballet Company and Birmingham Royal ballet. During this period her students also won awards at the Geneé international ballet competition including two gold awards.

In 2005, Walton-Mahon was invited to the board of examiners for the Royal Academy of Dance. In 2007 she founded the National College of Dance in Newcastle. She was a Royal Academy of Dance Examiner and a tutor until she resigned from its duties in 2018.

In 2016 Walton-Mahon was invited by the RAD as a standardization and Solo Seal Examiner. She was also awarded life membership of the Royal Academy of dance.

She was awarded the Medal of the Order of Australia in the 2021 Queen's Birthday Honours for "service to dance as a teacher".

== Innovations and teaching technique ==
Walton-Mahon started studying books on anatomy and in 1979 started training with Valarie Grieg who is the author of inside ballet technique. This experience inspired Walton-Mahon to learn and create innovative and safe teaching styles.

In the mid 90s Walton-Mahon commenced working with a group of 10 year old students with the use of stability balls and found that they became more aware of their posture, alignment and weight placement within just three months. This finding made her explore further into this concept of teaching. In 2006 she further experimented with these exercises and started creating PBT using a 16 year old male student, Daniel Roberge who had no former ballet training at that time and given instructions to practice according to the PBT technique. Two years later he went on completing all senior examinations, winning the silver award at Genée International Competition 2007 held in Singapore.

Walton-Mahon created the Progressing Ballet Technique which is used as a teaching technique around the world. As part of her passion for safe training and innovation, she launched "backalast" a special posture jacket to assist with the famous "tech-neck" condition. She was able to launch the product after four years on research in the field.

== Personal life ==
Marie Walton-Mahon married Paddy Mahon in 1979. Together they have two children: a daughter Veronica and son Laurie. Marie and Paddy have a grandson named Riley and granddaughter named Hadley.d
