= Joseph Caley =

English ballet dancer

- Born: Hull, England
- Education: The Royal Ballet School
- Occupation: ballet dancer
- Years active: 2005-present
- Career
- Current group: English National Ballet
- Former groups: Birmingham Royal Ballet

Joseph Caley is an English ballet dancer. He joined the Birmingham Royal Ballet and became a principal dancer in 2011. He left in 2017 to join the English National Ballet and was promoted to lead principal months later. Caley joined the Australian Ballet in 2022 as a principal artist.

== Early life ==
Caley was born in Hull. He started dancing when his mother sent him to the same dance school his sister went, and had two afternoon sessions per week. He was then sent to audition for the Royal Ballet Lower School and was accepted. He later progressed to the Upper School.

== Career ==
In his second year at the Royal Ballet Upper School, Caley was invited by Birmingham Royal Ballet's then-artistic director David Bintley to join the company, but the school's director at the time Gailene Stock convinced him to have one more year of training, before he joined the company in 2005, and became a principal dancer in 2011. Among the ballets he danced lead roles in are Giselle, Swan Lake, The Sleeping Beauty, The Nutcracker and Cinderella.

In July 2017, Caley announced that he would join the London-based English National Ballet as a principal for "diversity of repertoire." In the first few months in the company, the roles he danced included Romeo in Nureyev's Romeo and Juliet, James in La Sylphide, The Man in Song of the Earth. In December that year, his promotion to lead principal was announced at backstage, following a performance of The Nutcracker, in which he danced The Nephew. The promotion was effective the following month. One of the lead roles he had danced since was Des Grieux in Manon.

He made an appearance with the Birmingham Royal Ballet in June 2018. Other guest appearances he made includes Miyako Yoshida's Stars Dancer Ballet in Japan, The Australian Ballet, and at the opening of Hull UK City of Culture 2017.

In 2022, Caley left the English National Ballet to join the Australian Ballet as a principal artist.
