= Thomas Dixon Centre =

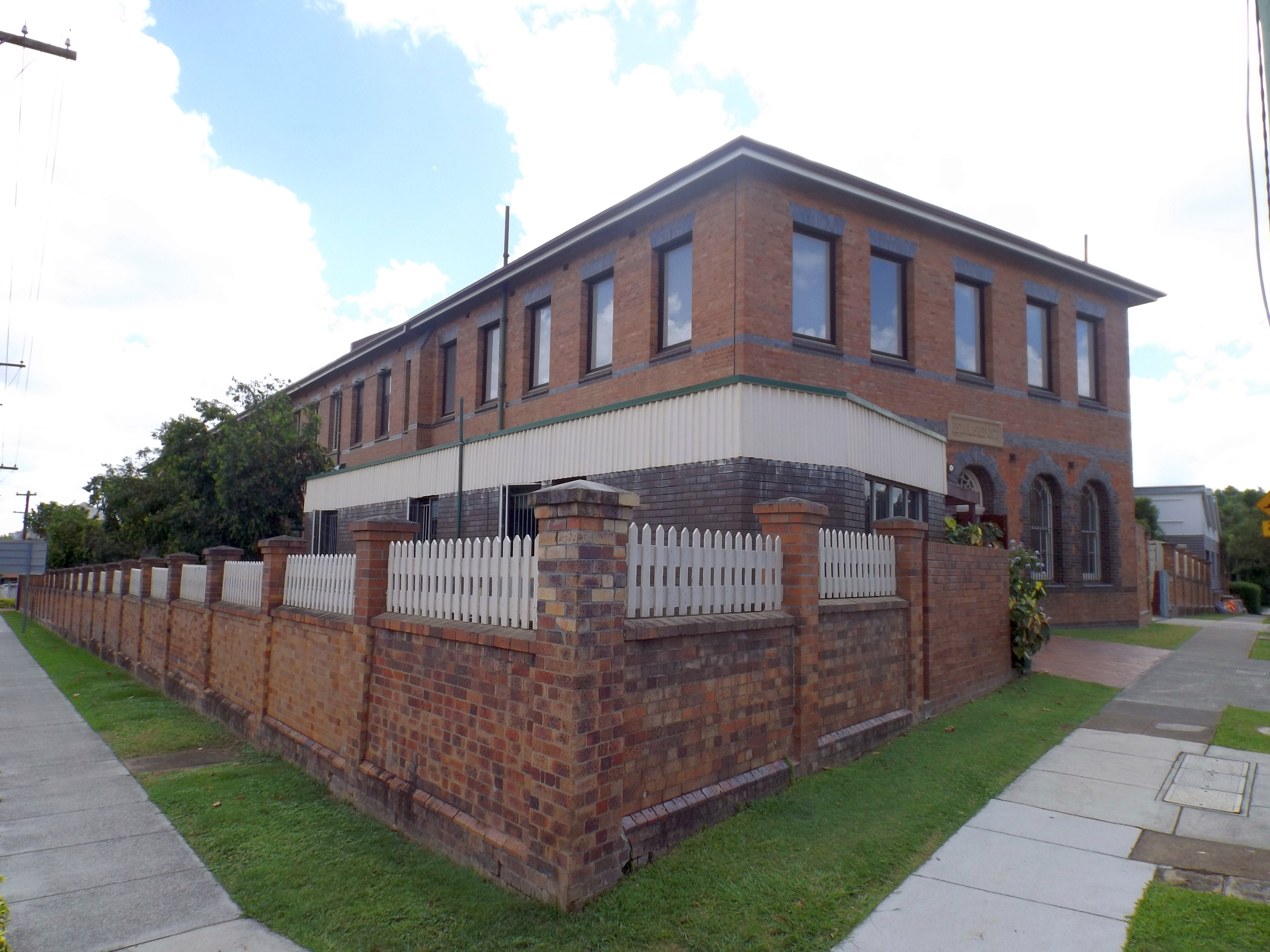
- Building in 2015

- Location within Queensland Location within Australia
- 27.4862°S 153.0018°E
- Location: 406 Montague Road, West End, Queensland, Australia

History
- Design period: 1900–1914 (early 20th century)
- Built: 1908

Site notes
- Architectural style: Georgian Revival

Queensland Heritage Register
- Official name: Thomas Dixon Centre, Dixon's Shoe Centre, T C Dixon & Sons
- Type: state heritage (built)
- Designated: 5 October 1998
- Reference no.: 601024
- Significant period: 1908–1920, c. 1942, 1965 (fabric); 1908–1973, 1991 (historical)
- Significant components: factory building, machinery/plant/equipment – manufacturing/processing, store/s / storeroom / storehouse, showroom, air raid shelter, engine/generator shed/room / power supply

Thomas Dixon Centre is a heritage-listed former factory and now a venue for the performing arts at 406 Montague Road, West End, Queensland, Australia. It was built in 1908. It is also known as Dixon's Shoe Centre and T C Dixon & Sons. It was added to the Queensland Heritage Register on 5 October 1998.

== History ==
The Thomas Dixon Centre was constructed in 1908 as premises for the expanding business of Thomas Dixon, bootmaker and tanner. A substantial two-storey brick building, it was designed by Richard Gailey Architects.

In 1869, encouraged by his brother who was already residing in Brisbane, Thomas Coar Dixon relocated from New South Wales, where he had established a small tannery, to Brisbane. Shortly after his arrival, Dixon established a tannery at West End, which was expanded in 1878 to incorporate a boot and shoe manufacturing business, with equipment, machinery and lasts brought by Dixon from Sydney.

Tanneries and boot and shoe manufacturing were among the earliest established industries in Brisbane. In Barton's Jubilee History of Queensland it is stated that by 1909 there were 21 boot making factories, employing over 1000 people in the metropolitan area. T C Dixon and Sons are mentioned as one of the companies having recently constructed a large factory.

The first Dixon shoe factory was opened in Russell Street and was announced in The Queenslander on 6 July 1878. The advertisement guaranteed that the TCD Brand was "equal to any boot manufactured" due to use of machines of the 'latest and most approved construction and the best materials only being used.'

Disruptions to the business occurred in 1885 when fire destroyed the buildings and again in 1893 when floods damaged goods and swept the tannery shed away. By the early 1900s, Thomas Dixon's son was urging him to construct larger premises. This was partially due to the loss of the previous buildings, but also due to delays of customer orders due to the lack of space available for the employment of additional hands.

In 1906, Dixon purchased the land bounded by Montague Road, and Raven and Drake Streets prior to travelling to Sydney to view the most recently constructed boot manufacturing premises. On his return to Brisbane, Dixon engaged architect Richard Gailey and (according to Dixon) with Dixon's suggestions and Gailey's skill they designed 'the present magnificent building.'

Richard Gailey was one of Queensland's most prolific architects. Born in Ireland, he emigrated to Australia in 1864. Described as the 'doyen of Brisbane's architects,' he is responsible for the design of many substantial buildings in Brisbane, including the Baptist City Tabernacle, a number of hotels including the Regatta and the Orient, private homes including Moorlands and Verney, and commercial buildings and warehouses including Smellie and Co.'s Warehouse, the Metro Arts building and Finney Isles and Co. He also designed many buildings in various towns throughout Queensland. The contractor of the new Dixon's factory was Mr Burton. Constructed of brick, the warehouse was described by Thomas Dixon as second to none in appearance in the Commonwealth.

The building is symmetrically composed and uses materials which were uncommon for factory buildings of the period. It is Georgian Revival in style, with details including sills, banding and dressings picked out in dark blue salt glazed bricks. The roof was originally covered with diagonally laid asbestos-cement slates which were developed in France and not imported to Australia until c. 1904. They were not manufactured in Australia until after the First World War. The slates survive under the present super-six sheeting.

The front elevation features windows with arched glazing bars, whilst the fanlight above the door features scalloped glazing bars. The remainder of the windows were originally nine paned in rows of three which pivoted inwards or outwards, however most were replaced with sheet glass or glass louvres in 1983.

Internally, the ground floor originally consisted of an office and storerooms which were located at the southern end of the building. A brick fire wall divided them from the larger area which housed the workroom. The first floor was similarly divided, with the southern end housing a warehouse for finished shoes and a small showroom. The remainder of the first floor contained presses to cut uppers and an area for sewing the uppers. The engine room was located in a single storey building attached to the eastern side of the main building and the original gas engine which drove power shafts suspended beneath the first floor was replaced with an electric motor c. 1920. This method of power was replaced by self-contained sewing machines c. 1965.

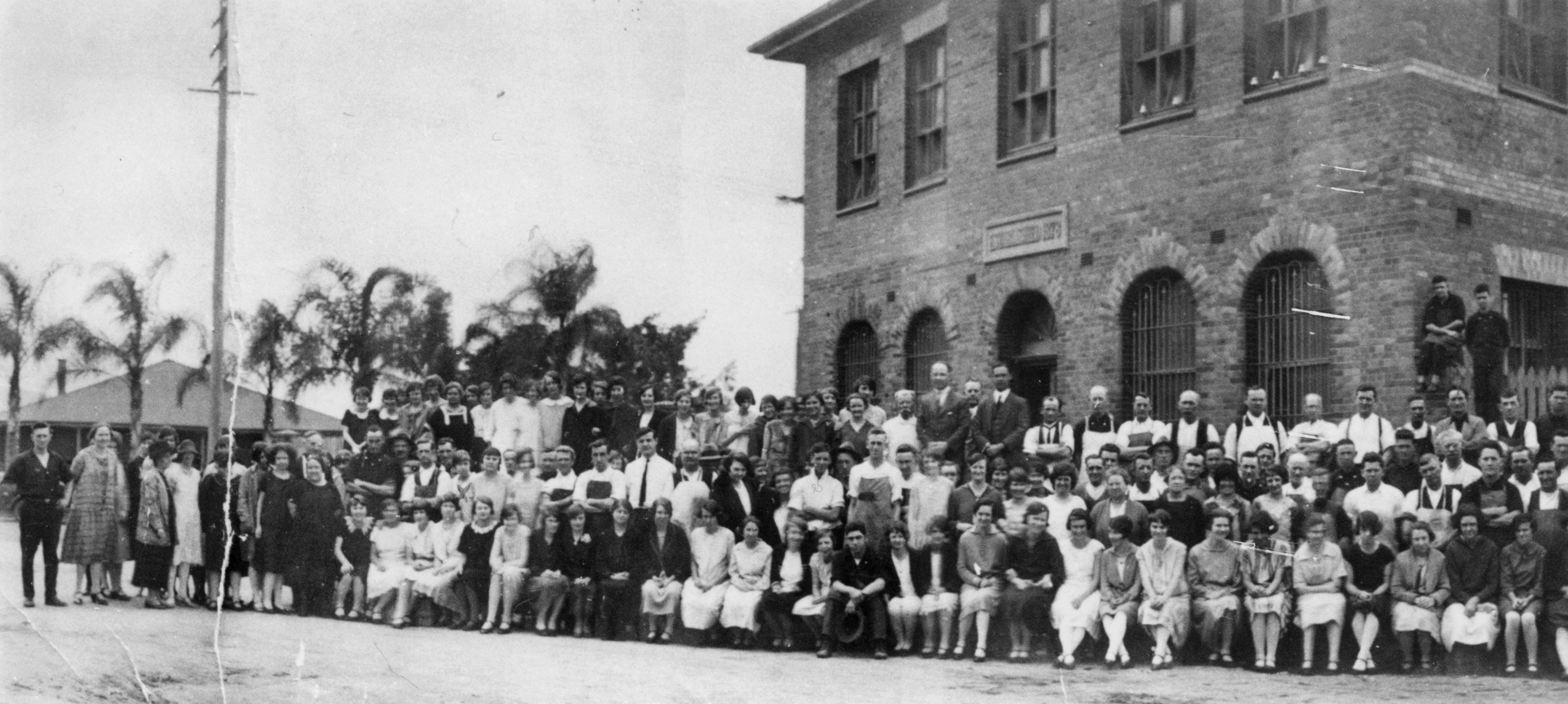
Staff pictured outside Dixons Shoe Factory, West End

The new factory was in close proximity to residential dwellings, indicative of the nineteenth century/early twentieth century practice of workers living close to their place of employment. It appears that Thomas Dixon also resided in West End upon his arrival in Brisbane, and the Post Office Directories record him residing near the factory from 1883 until his death in 1909.

After Dixon's death, the business continued under the management of his sons, one of whom managed the shoe factory whilst the other managed the tannery.

Additional buildings were constructed on the site, including a store for wooden lasts constructed prior to 1920, an air raid shelter constructed during the Second World War, and an addition to the south western corner of the factory comprising air conditioned office and showroom, constructed in 1965, all of which survive on the site. A staff amenities block and garage were also constructed, however these no longer survive.

The company of T C Dixon and Sons continued to operate from the West End factory until 1973 when they sold the factory to K D Morris and moved to new and larger premises at Wacol.

In 1975, the building was purchased by the Queensland Government and used as a store until 1991 when it became the home of the Queensland Ballet and the Queensland Philharmonic Orchestra after undergoing a $1.8 million refurbishment.

In August 2019, the Queensland Government and Queensland Ballet begin a $62 million renovation adding a new theatre, additional dance studios, eateries and three public art instillations: a carpet by local Brisbane artist Judy Watson, an ever-evolving digital artwork by Singaporean art groupTeamLab titled ‘Continuous Life and Death at the Now of Eternity II’ and a trilogy of outdoor sculptures titled ‘Ensemble' in the entrance forecourt by Sydney-based artist Jamie North. The building reopened in 2022.

== Description ==
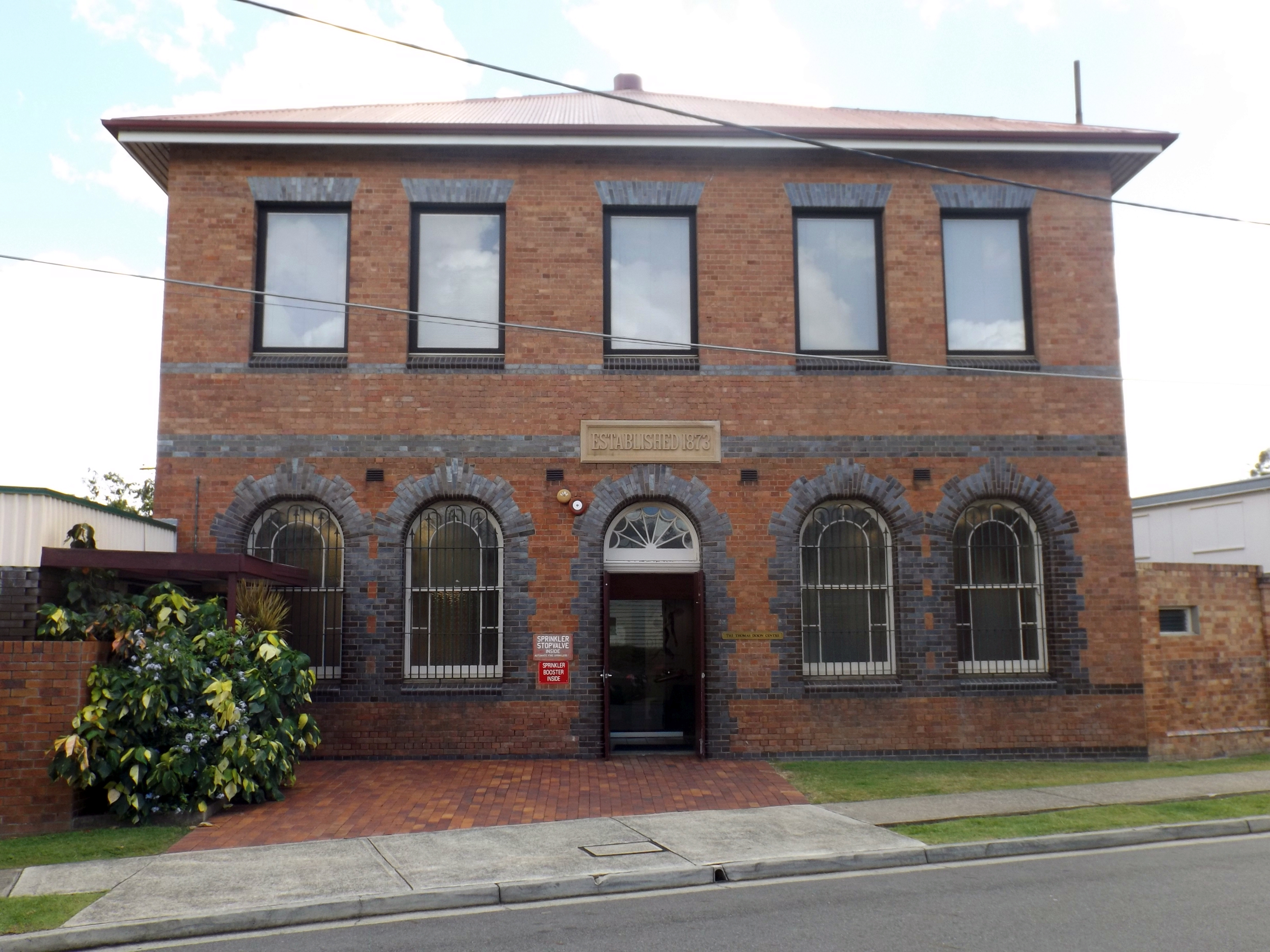
Drake Street entrance, 2015

The Dixon Centre is a substantial two storey brick building, rectangular in plan with a super six asbestos-cement roof covering the original roof of asbestos-cement slates. The site is bounded by Montague Road and Drake and Raven Streets, along which are located a substantial brick fence (which becomes a retaining wall in places) surmounted by regularly spaced brick piers. The timber picket fence which original enclosed the space between the piers is no longer extant. Also located on the site is the store for the Queensland Ballet props (formerly the store for wooden lasts), the engine house, air raid shelter and 1965 brick addition to the main building.

The main building is located at the front of the site with the long axis following the Montague Road boundary. The foundations and ground floor are constructed of concrete which support load bearing walls of plain red machine-made bricks laid in English bond pattern. Attached buttresses are evenly spaced along the walls on the long axis, and sills, dressings and banding at the first floor and sill levels and are highlighted with dark blue salt glazed bricks. Two sets of new metal fire stairs are located on the eastern side of the building.

A single storey brick air raid shelter is located on the eastern side of the main building, the top of which is used as an outdoor seating area opening from the former engine room, now a kitchenette. The 1965 brick showroom at the southwestern corner also survives.

The front entrance, facing Drake Street is symmetrically composed, with a centrally located doorway flanked by windows on either side. The doorway features a pair of five panel bolection moulded doors, surmounted by a fanlight with scalloped glazing bars. The windows to the ground level have arched headers, and they and the entrance are surrounded by dark blue salt glazed voussoirs set out in the manner of a Gibbs surround. A sandstone tablet above the entrance is relief carved with the words "ESTABLISHED 1873". The original nine paned windows to the first floor have been replaced with single panes of sheet glass and have flat arches of dark blue salt glazed voussoirs.

The rear elevation, facing Raven Street is similarly composed to the front elevation, but with a less decorative central doorway and rectangular windows featuring three vertical rows of glass louvres to both floors.

Each of the side elevations are also symmetrically composed with a regular fenestration pattern. All windows to the side and rear elevation have three vertical rows of glass louvres with flat arches of dark blue salt glazed voussoirs.

The brick fire wall is evident approximately one third from the Drake Street end of the building. It divides both the walls and the hipped roof which has ventilators evenly spaced along its ridge.

Internally, the space is divided into offices around a central corridor on the ground floor and four practice rooms, three of which are interconnecting, on the first floor. Stairs are internally located both centrally and at the northern end on the Montague Road side of the building. The former engine room is now utilised as a kitchenette.

The first floor practice rooms have exposed king post trusses which span the width of the building.. Evidence of the original use and form of the building includes a piece of equipment suspended within the roof trusses of the practice room at the southern end, hardwood columns in the reception space and exposed brick walls to some areas and an early fire system in the entrance.

A timber framed weatherboard building with a saw tooth roof is located in the south-eastern corner of the site. It is now used as a store for the Queensland Ballet and is an open space divided by wire mesh screens. The walls are unlined and the floor is timber. Light is provided by windows on the side elevations and on the vertical planes of the saw tooth roof.

== Heritage listing ==
Thomas Dixon Centre was listed on the Queensland Heritage Register on 5 October 1998 having satisfied the following criteria.

The place is important in demonstrating the evolution or pattern of Queensland's history.

Constructed in 1908 as a shoe and boot manufacturing factory, the Thomas Dixon Centre provides evidence of an early Brisbane industry which is now obsolete.

Surrounded by residential dwellings, the location of the factory demonstrates the former practice of workers to live close to their place of employment.

The place demonstrates rare, uncommon or endangered aspects of Queensland's cultural heritage.

The Thomas Dixon Centre provides evidence of early manufacturing industries in Queensland. The significance of the building is further enhanced as few buildings providing evidence of early manufacturing industries survive in Brisbane.

The Thomas Dixon Centre is a rare surviving example of an early twentieth century industrial factory in West End and demonstrates the principal characteristics of a building of its type through its form and use of materials. It also incorporates unusually decorative features for a building of its type, such as feature brickwork and decorative glazing bars to the front windows.

The place is important in demonstrating the principal characteristics of a particular class of cultural places.

The Thomas Dixon Centre is a rare surviving example of an early twentieth century industrial factory in West End and demonstrates the principal characteristics of a building of its type through its form and use of materials. It also incorporates unusually decorative features for a building of its type, such as feature brickwork and decorative glazing bars to the front windows.

The place is important because of its aesthetic significance.

It is a landmark within the streetscape due to its scale and elevated location. The symmetrical design and repetitive fenestration pattern, as well as details including the decorative windows to the front elevation and the use of dark blue salt glazed bricks contribute to the aesthetic significance of the place.

The place has a strong or special association with a particular community or cultural group for social, cultural or spiritual reasons.

As the headquarters of both the Queensland Ballet and the Queensland Philharmonic Orchestra since 1991, the Thomas Dixon Centre has strong associations with these particular cultural groups and the community of West End.

The place has a special association with the life or work of a particular person, group or organisation of importance in Queensland's history.

The Centre has strong association with the Dixon Family who held a high reputation in Brisbane as a "family" company with management providing good working conditions for their staff.

The place also has special association with architect Richard Gailey, as an example of his work.
