= Hong Kong Ballet =

Classical ballet company founded in 1979

General information
- Name: Hong Kong Ballet
- Year founded: 1979
- Website: hkballet.com

Artistic staff
- Artistic Director: Septime Webre (since June 2017)

Hong Kong Ballet
- Traditional Chinese: 香港芭蕾舞團
- Simplified Chinese: 香港芭蕾舞团
Transcriptions
Standard Mandarin
- Hanyu Pinyin: Xiānggǎng Bālěiwǔ Tuán
Yue: Cantonese
- Jyutping: hoeng1 gong2 baa1 leoi4 mou5 tyun4

The Hong Kong Ballet (香港芭蕾舞團) is a classical ballet company founded in 1979.

== History ==
The company was created in 1979.

Since 1997, The Hong Kong Ballet has concluded more than 30 tours to 10 countries in North and South America, Europe and Asia.

In January 2010, Faye Leung, the company's former top ballerina, revealed in a book that she was sacked from the HK Ballet on suspicious that she was dividing dancers and organizing a strike.

In June 2010, the Company took part in Expo 2010 Shanghai, presenting a mixed bill production and performing as part of Festive Hong Kong Celebration. The Hong Kong Ballet’s dancers also performed at the 4th and 5th International Dance Festivals held in Cali, Colombia; the 50th Anniversary International Gala in Brisbane, Australia; and the International Ballettgala XI in Dortmund, Germany. Most recently, the Company presented Firecracker in Macau in January 2012. In the summer of 2012, The Hong Kong Ballet toured the United States and Canada with a mixed bill featuring two specially commissioned contemporary ballets. The company made its debut appearance at Jacob’s Pillow Dance Festival and then performed in Aspen, Montreal and Santa Fe.

In October 2013, the company was accused of self-censorship during a production of The Dream of Red Chamber. Originally shown at the end of the ballet, the 12-minute projection sequence depicted different stages in China's history. In the part depicting the Cultural Revolution, dancers in Red Guards uniforms waved copies of Mao Ze Dong's little red book. Following the premiere, the sequence was cut from the show. Wang Xinpeng, the choreographer, claimed he did not agree with the deletion of the scene.

In June 2017, Septime Webre, of Cuban-American origins, previously the artistic director of The Washington Ballet for 17 years, was named Artistic Director of the Ballet. For 2018, he planned a contemporary program which featured the music of the Beatles. He also organized Ballet in the City, outdoors dancing events in different art galleries of the city, and a series of other events "to insert the company and its dancers into the social fabric of the city".

== Description ==
=== Repertoire ===
The Company performs a repertoire that combines 19th to 21st century classical, contemporary works and newly commissioned ballets. This repertoire reflects both the heritage and origin of ballet in Europe as well as contemporary influences, and includes commissions focused on Hong Kong's culture and history, such as Firecracker by local choreographer Yuri Ng. The company's repertoire encompasses full-length ballets such as Swan Lake, The Sleeping Beauty, The Nutcracker and Giselle, and the finest classical and neo-classical works of the 20th and the 21st centuries, including George Balanchine's Rubies and Tchaikovsky Pas de Deux; Rudi van Dantzig's Romeo and Juliet; Ronald Hynd's The Merry Widow and Coppélia; and Wang Xin Pang's Serenade and Pas de Six from Mozart. The company has also performed contemporary ballets such as William Forsythe's Steptext, Nils Christe's Symphony in Three Movements, Stephen Mills's Hush, and Stanton Welch's Clear. The Hong Kong Ballet's commissions include Natalie Weir's Turandot, and Stephen Baynes's The Way Alone.

=== Company ===
The Hong Kong Ballet has an artistic team of over 40 dancers. The majority of the dancers are from China, others are international recruits.

- Artistic Director – Septime Webre (衛承天) (since June 2017)
- Chief Representative, Mainland, China – Tang Min
- Ballet Master – Luis R. Torres
- Ballet Master – Yuh Egami (江上悠)
- Associate Ballet Master – Wei Wei
- Guest Ballet Master – Liang Jing
- Choreographer-in-Residence: Hu Song Wei Ricky
- Pianist – Nicholas Lau
- Sports Practitioner – Arlene Mackinlay

==== Principal dancers ====
Name	Nationality	Training	Status
Ye Feifei	People's Republic of China	Xun Yan Ballet School; Goh Ballet Academy	
Shen Jie	People's Republic of China	Zhejiang Vocational Academy of Art; Guangzhou Dance School; Hong Kong Academy for Performing Arts	
Wei Wei	People's Republic of China	Shenyang Conservatory of Music (Dance Major)	Principal Character Dancer (Retired as principal dancer on 17-Oct-2021)

==== Soloists ====
Name	Nationality	Training
Jessica Burrows	Canada	Canada's National Ballet School
Dong Ruixue	People's Republic of China	Beijing Dance Academy
Gao Ge	People's Republic of China	Beijing Dance Academy
Amber Lewis	Australia	Ecole Studios; The Washington School of Ballet
Wang Qingxin	People's Republic of China	Ballet School of Liaoning
Yang Ruiqi	People's Republic of China	Shanghai Dance School; John Cranko School
Garry Corpuz	Philippine	Philippine High School for the Arts
Albert Gordon	United Kingdom	The Washington School of Ballet
Ma Renjie	People's Republic of China	Hang Zhou Art School; Hong Kong Academy for Performing Arts
Jonathan Spigner	United States of America	South Carolina Governor's School of Arts and Humanities; Académie Princesse Grace

==== Retired dancers ====
Name	Nationality	Training	Retired Date	Status
Venus Villa	Cuba	Cuban National Ballet; La Scala Theatre Ballet School	20-Jun-2021	

==== Leave dancers ====
Name	Nationality	Training	Leave Date	Status
Chen Zhiyao	People's Republic of China	Beijing Dance Academy	16-Jun-2021	First soloist of Finnish_National_Ballet
Li Jiabo	People's Republic of China	Shanghai Far East Ballet School; Hong Kong Academy for Performing Arts		
Li Lin	People's Republic of China	Beijing Dance Academy		

== See also ==
- Shanghai Ballet Company
