= Robyn Hendricks =

South African ballet dancer

- Born: 1985 or 1986 (age 40–41); South Africa
- Occupation: ballet dancer
- Employer: The Australian Ballet
- Spouse: Charles Thompson

Robyn Hendricks is a South African ballet dancer who is a principal artist with The Australian Ballet.

== Biography ==
Hendricks grew up in Port Elizabeth, South Africa. She started ballet late, at the age of eight, after her grandfather recognised her potential. She studied in the Cecchetti method and qualified for the Cecchetti International Competition in Melbourne in 2001, during which she was invited to audition for The Australian Ballet School. While at the school, she studied with The National Ballet School of Canada for four weeks. In 2005 she joined The Australian Ballet and was promoted soloist in 2011. She was promoted to senior artist in 2016 and named principal artist later the same year.

Hendricks is married to former fellow company member Charles Thompson.

== Selected repertoire ==
- Jiří Kylián's Petite Mort (2005, 2014)
- Christopher Wheeldon's After the Rain (2011)
- Gamzatti in Stanton Welch’s La Bayadère (2014)
