= Amber Scott =

Australian ballet dancer

- Born: 1982 or 1983 (age 41–42); Brisbane, Queensland, Australia
- Occupation: Ballet dancer
- Spouse: Ty King-Wall
- Children: 2
- Career
- Current group: The Australian Ballet
- Dances: Ballet

Amber Scott is an Australian ballet dancer. She was a principal artist at The Australian Ballet before retiring in 2023 after 22 years with the company.

== Early life ==
Scott was born and raised in Brisbane, Australia. She started dance classes at age three and ballet at age five. She also attended jazz and tap classes. When Scott was eleven, her family relocated to Melbourne, and she started training at The Australian Ballet School.

== Career ==
Scott joined The Australian Ballet in 2001, at age 17. In 2003, she spent five months at the Royal Danish Ballet and learned the Bournonville method there. In 2011, Scott was promoted to Principal Artist after dancing the second movement in Kenneth MacMillan's Concerto. She has danced classical roles such as Princess Aurora and the Lilac Fairy in The Sleeping Beauty, Odette/Odile in Swan Lake, Sugar Plum Fairy in The Nutcracker, the title role in Manon and Tatiana in Onegin, as well as contemporary pieces such as Chroma and After the Rain.

== Personal life ==
Scott is married to the Artistic Director of the RNZB Ty King-Wall. They have two daughters.

== Selected repertoire ==
- Swanilda in Coppélia
- Aurora and the Lilac Fairy in The Sleeping Beauty
- Giselle in Giselle
- Nikiya in La Bayadère
- The Sugar Plum Fairy in The Nutcracker
- Odette/Odile in Swan Lake
- Odette in Graeme Murphy's Swan Lake
- Manon in Manon
- Tatiana in Onegin
- Hanna in The Merry Widow
- Second movement in Concerto
- Chroma
- After the Rain

== Awards ==
- Helpmann Award nomination for Stephen Baynes’ Swan Lake, 2013
- Telstra Ballet Dancer Award and Telstra People's Choice Award, 2004
- First Place Junior Asian Pacific Competition, Tokyo, 1999
- Adeline Genée Awards, bronze medal, 1998
