= Progressing Ballet Technique =

Program for students of dance

Progressing Ballet Technique (PBT) is a program developed by Marie Walton-Mahon to help students advance in all dance forms by training muscle memory.

PBT focuses on core stability, weight placement and alignment. PBT is practiced internationally.
