= Matthew Golding =

Matthew Golding may refer to:

- Matthew Golding (footballer)
- Matthew Golding (dancer)
