= David McAllister (dancer) =

Australian ballet dancer (born 1963)

David Graeme McAllister AC
- Born: 25 November 1963 (age 62); Perth, Western Australia
- Education: Australian Ballet School
- Occupations: Dancer, artistic director
- Known for: Former principal dancer with The Australian Ballet
- Awards: Queen Elizabeth II Coronation Medal, Centenary Medal

David Graeme McAllister AC (born 25 November 1963) is the former artistic director and principal dancer of The Australian Ballet.

== Biography ==
David McAllister was born in 1963 in Perth, Western Australia. A graduate of the Australian Ballet School, he joined The Australian Ballet in 1983. He was promoted to senior artist in 1986 and to principal artist in 1989. His many principal roles with the company included those in Onegin, Romeo and Juliet, La fille mal gardée, The Sleeping Beauty, Don Quixote, The Sentimental Bloke, Coppélia, and Manon.

In 1985, he won a bronze medal at the fifth Moscow International Ballet Competition, which saw him invited to return to the USSR as a guest artist, where he made numerous appearances with the Bolshoi Ballet, the Kirov Ballet, the Georgian National Ballet and other companies. In 1989, McAllister was guest artist with the National Ballet of Canada, dancing John Cranko's Romeo and Juliet as well as Études and The Four Temperaments. He has also been a guest artist with Birmingham Royal Ballet and Singapore Dance Theatre. In London in 1992, he took part in the royal gala performance of Coppélia in the presence of the Princess of Wales.

McAllister has worked as a guest teacher with The McDonald College, the Australian Ballet School, the Dancers Company, the Royal Academy of Dance, the Cecchetti Society, and the Australian Institute of Classical Dance. In November 2000, he completed a graduate diploma in Arts and Entertainment Management at Deakin University.

McAllister danced for the final time in Giselle on 24 March 2001 at the Sydney Opera House and became artistic director of The Australian Ballet in July 2001. He was elected vice president of the Royal Academy of Dance in 2005. In March 2020, it was announced that David Hallberg would succeed McAllister as the new artistic director of The Australian Ballet, effective January 2021.

== Personal life ==
McAllister is as of 2021 the domestic partner of Australian playwright and artistic director Wesley Enoch.

== Bibliography ==
- McAllister, David; Amanda Dunn (September 2020). Soar: A Life Freed by Dance. Thames & Hudson. ISBN 9781760761356.
- Ballet Confidential: A personal behind-the-scenes guide. Thames & Hudson. 2023. ISBN 9781760763312.

== Honours ==
In 2001, McAllister was awarded a Centenary Medal.

In the 2004 Australia Day Honours he was appointed a Member of the Order of Australia for his services to ballet and was promoted to Companion of the Order of Australia in the 2021 Queen's Birthday Honours on 14 June 2021.

In April 2021, McAllister was awarded the Queen Elizabeth II Coronation Award by the Royal Academy of Dance (RAD).

=== Helpmann Awards ===
The Helpmann Awards is an awards show, celebrating live entertainment and performing arts in Australia, presented by industry group Live Performance Australia (LPA) since 2001. In 2020, McAllister received the JC Williamson Award, the LPA's highest honour, for his life's work in live performance.

Year	Nominee / work	Award	Result
2020	Himself	JC Williamson Award	awarded
