= Chengwu Guo =

Chinese ballet dancer (born 1988/89)

- Born: 1988 or 1989 (age 36–37); Jiujiang, Jiangxi, China
- Occupation: ballet dancer
- Employer: The Australian Ballet

Guo Chengwu (Chinese: 郭承武; pinyin: Guō Chéngwǔ), also known as Chengwu Guo, is a Chinese ballet dancer, and a principal artist with The Australian Ballet.

== Dance career ==
Guo was born in China. At the age of 11 he joined the Beijing Dance Academy. After he won a scholarship in the 2006 Prix de Lausanne ballet competition he joined The Australian Ballet School at the age of 17. While at the school Guo toured with The Dancers Company (the graduate year touring programme). He joined The Australian Ballet in 2008. In 2011 he was promoted to coryphée and to soloist in 2012. In April 2013 Guo was promoted to senior artist, and on 25 November 2013 Guo was promoted to principal artist.

Guo won both the Telstra Ballet Dancer Award and Telstra People's Choice Award for 2011. He was the first male dancer to win both awards.

== Selected repertoire ==
- Mercutio and Tybalt in Graeme Murphy's Romeo & Juliet 2011 (Guo received the Telstra awards at the end of the Sydney first night of this production)
- First Red Knight in Dame Ninette de Valois' Checkmate 2011

== Other activities ==
Guo was invited back to China in 2009 to compete in a Chinese television show, So You Think You Can Dance, which he won, with an audience of 80 million people.

Guo played the young Li Cunxin in the 2009 film Mao's Last Dancer.

== Awards ==
- Tao Li Bei of China Competition (Chinese: 桃李杯; pinyin: Táolǐ bēi; lit. 'Peaches and Plums Cup', the Tao Li Cup), gold medal
- Prix de Lausanne 2006, scholarship
- Telstra Ballet Dancer Award and Telstra People's Choice Award 2011
