= Stephen Baynes =

Australian ballet dancer

Stephen Baynes (born 1956 in Adelaide, South Australia) has been Resident Choreographer with The Australian Ballet since 1995. He trained with Joanne Priest and graduated from The Australian Ballet School in 1975. He has danced with the Australian Ballet (1976–81, 1985 and promoted to Soloist in 1992), the Stuttgart Ballet (1981–84) and worked with choreographers such as Kenneth MacMillan, John Neumeier, William Forsythe and Hans van Manen.

He has also created works for La Scala Ballet, Sydney Dance Company, West Australian Ballet, the Queensland Ballet, Pacific Northwest Ballet and New York City Ballet's Diamond Project.

== Choreography ==
- Strauss Songs (1986) (Note: for the Australian Ballet.)
- Ballade (for The Australian Ballet's 25th Anniversary Choreographic Competition, 1988–1989)
- Catalyst (1988)
- Andante (1990)
- Four Reflections of a Quintet (1993, The Dancers Company)
- Souvenirs (1994)
- Episodes (for La Scala Theatre Ballet)
- Beyond Bach
- Into the Darkness (for the West Australian Ballet)
- At the edge of night (Note: for the Australian Ballet at the Melbourne International Arts Festival.)
- Into Dharma (1986, Sydney Dance Company)
- Shadow in the Facet (1986)
- 1914 (1997)
- The Fold (1999, The Queensland Ballet)
- Lachrimae (2000, West Australian Ballet)
- Molto Vivace (2003)
- Unspoken dialogues (2004, to the music of Sonata No. 1 for violin and piano by Alfred Schnittke
- restaged "Raymonda (2006)
- Constant Variants (2007)
- Night Path (2008)

== Awards ==
- 1988 Qantas Youth Award
- 1995 Kelvin Coe Memorial Scholarship
