= Queensland Ballet =

Dance company in Queensland, Australia

General information
- Name: Queensland Ballet
- Previous names: Lisner Ballet Company
- Year founded: 1960
- Founders: Charles Lisner
- Principal venue: Thomas Dixon Centre, West End, Brisbane, Australia
- Website: queenslandballet.com.au

Artistic staff
- Artistic Director: Greg Horsman
- Assistant Artistic Director Ballet Mistress Ballet Masters Music Director: Greg Horsman Mary Li; Zenia Tatcheva; Jillian Vanstone; Matthew Lawrence; Nigel Gaynor

Other
- Associated schools: Queensland Ballet Academy
- Formation: Principal Artist; Senior Soloist; Soloist; First Company Artist; Company Artist; Young Artist

Queensland Ballet, founded in 1960 by Charles Lisner, is the premier ballet company of Queensland, Australia, and is based in Brisbane. It is one of only three full-time, professional classical ballet companies in Australia. The company has had six previous Artistic Directors, and is currently led by Ivan Gil-Ortega.

In 2023, the company consists of 60 dancers, including 12 Jette Parker Young Artists.

== History ==
=== Charles Lisner (1960–1974) ===
Queensland Ballet’s founding Artistic Director, Charles Lisner, trained with Edouard Borovansky and danced with the Borovansky Australian Ballet prior to traveling to London to continue his dance studies with the Sadlers Wells Ballet School. He later joined The Royal Ballet, Convent Garden. In 1953, Charles returned to Australia to open the Lisner Ballet Academy, which became the Lisner Ballet Company in 1960. The company was re-named Queensland Ballet in 1962 and became one of the first ballet ensembles in Australia to tour regionally, a commitment that continues today.

=== Harry Haythorne (1974–1978) ===
Lisner stepped down as Artistic Director in 1974 and was replaced by Harry Haythorne, who was previously Assistant Director of the Scottish ballet. During his tenure, Haythorne presented works by Australian choreographers including Graeme Murphy, Garth Welch, and Don Asker, and had Hans Brenaa stage La Sylphide and other Bournonville ballets. His contract with the company ended in 1978.

=== Harold Collins (1978–1997) ===
A former Principal Dancer of Queensland Ballet, Harold Collins was appointed Artistic Director in 1978, and led the company until his retirement in 1997. During that time, he presented memorable productions, among them Jacqui Carroll's Scheherazade and Carmina Burana and Collin's Salome, Carmen and Romeo & Juliet. Following Lisner's vision, Collins continued to commission new Australian works in contemporary and classical styles, and forged the enduring relationship between Queensland Ballet and the Queensland Dance School of Excellence.

=== François Klaus (1998–2012) ===
François Klaus was appointed Artistic Director and Chief Choreographer of Queensland Ballet in 1988. Over fifteen years, Klaus contributed nearly 100 new ballet works to the company's repertoire, from new productions of classic ballets to works designed especially to appeal to families. Included in his repertoire is the immensely popular Cloudland, a tribute to Brisbane's post-war era set in the once famous Cloudland Ballroom.

Under his directorship, Queensland Ballet undertook three tours to Europe (2006, 2007, and 2009), to great public and critical acclaim. The company also toured to Singapore in March 2007, Japan in 2009, and China in 2011 to perform Alice in Wonderland and The Little Mermaid.

During his tenure, Klaus also established training programs which are now an integral part of the company's operations, providing pathways for talented young people who are committed to a career in dance.

=== Li Cunxin (2013–2023) ===
In 2012, Li Cunxin, acclaimed former dancer and author of the best-selling autobiography, Mao's Last Dancer, was appointed as the new Artistic Director. Having no desire to choreograph himself, Li became the first curatorial director in the company's history.

Li has been recognised for his dedication and commitment to growing the size and calibre of the company, having programmed adventurous works into their repertoire, incorporated additional international tours, and founding the development of the Queensland Ballet Academy and Thomas Dixon Centre.

In August 2015, the company performed Peter Schaufuss' La Sylphide at the London Coliseum.

In November 2018, they embarked on a China tour, performing Liam Scarlett's A Midsummer Night's Dream to audiences in Shanghai, Suzhou, Beijing, and Xi'an.

Li retired for health reasons at the end of 2023.

=== Leanne Benjamin (2024) ===
Rockhampton-born former principal dancer with The Royal Ballet, Leanne Benjamin was appointed Artistic Director in 2024.

=== Greg Horsman ( July 2024) ===
Ivan Gil-Ortega (2025)

== Performances ==
Queensland Ballet averages six main-stage productions per season, in addition to smaller, more intimate performances and regional tours. They have performed Ben Stevenson OBE’s The Nutcracker annually from 2013 to 2025. The company regularly performs at Queensland Performing Arts Centre (QPAC) as well as in the Talbot Theatre at the Thomas Dixon Centre.

== Dancers ==
List of Queensland Ballet dancers, as of 2023:

=== Principal artists ===
| Name | Nationality | Training | Other companies |
|---|---|---|---|
| Lucy Green | Australia | Victorian College of the Arts | Royal New Zealand Ballet |
| Alexander Idaszak | Australia | Australian Ballet School | |
| Yanela Piñera | Cuba | Cuban National Ballet School | Cuban National Ballet |
| Patricio Revé | Cuba | Cuban National Ballet School | Cuban National Ballet |
| Joel Woellner | Australia | Houston Ballet's Ben Stevenson Academy | Houston Ballet |
| Neneka Yoshida | Japan | Fundación para la Danza (Spain); Conservatoire de Paris | |

=== Senior soloists ===
- Chiara Gonzalez
- Kohei Iwamoto
- Alison McWhinney

=== Soloists ===
- Vito Bernasconi
- Lina Kim
- Georgia Swan
- Laura Tosar

=== First company artist ===
- D'Arcy Brazier
- Luke DiMattina
- Vanessa Morelli
- LIbby-Rose Niederer
- David Power
- Ivan Surodeev
- Rian Thompson
- Sophie Zoricic

=== Company artists ===
- Luca Armstrong
- Mali Comlekci
- Shaun Curtis
- Sean Ferenczi
- Lewis Formby
- Clayton Forsyth
- Heidi Freeman
- Renee Freeman
- Ines Hargreaves
- Kaho Kato
- Bronte Kielly-Coleman
- Dylan Lackey
- Callum Mackie
- Edison Manuel
- Briana McAllen
- Amber Mitchell-Knight
- Frederick Montgomery
- Joshua Ostermann
- Alisa Pukkinen
- Brooke Ray
- Paige Rochester
- Leisel Rose
- Alfie Shacklock
- Jessica Stratton-Smith
- Isabella Swietlicki
- Ari Thompson
- Kayla Van Den Bogert
- Eliza Wenham

=== Jette Parker Young Artists ===
- Ashlee Basford
- Joshua Douglas
- Taron Geyl
- Milana Gould
- Jack Jones
- Gina Lee
- Seth Marshall
- Annabelle McCoy
- Ethan Mrmacovski
- Joseph Moss
- Alyssa Park
- Corina Poh
