= The Australian Ballet =

Classical ballet company in Australia

General information
- Name: The Australian Ballet
- Predecessor: Borovansky Ballet
- Year founded: 1962; 64 years ago
- Founding artistic director: Dame Peggy van Praagh
- Principal venue: Level 6; 2 Kavanagh Street; Southbank; Victoria, Australia
- Website: www.australianballet.com.au

Artistic staff
- Artistic director: David Hallberg
- Resident choreographers: Stephen Baynes; Tim Harbour; Alice Topp; Stanton Welch

Other
- Associated schools: Australian Ballet School
- Formation: Principal Artist; Senior Artist; Soloist; Coryphée; Corps de Ballet

The Australian Ballet (TAB) is the largest classical ballet company in Australia. It was founded by J. C. Williamson Theatres Ltd and the Australian Elizabethan Theatre Trust in 1962, with the English-born dancer, teacher, repetiteur and director Dame Peggy van Praagh as founding artistic director. Today, it is recognised as one of the world's major international ballet companies and performs upwards of 150 performances (both in Australia and overseas) a year.

== History ==
The roots of the Australian Ballet can be found in the Borovansky Ballet, a touring repertory company founded in 1940 by the Czech dancer Edouard Borovansky. Borovansky had been a dancer in the touring ballet company of the famous Russian ballerina Anna Pavlova and, after visiting Australia on tour with the Covent Garden Russian Ballet, he decided to remain in Australia, establishing a ballet school in Melbourne in 1939, out of which he developed a performance group which became the Borovansky Ballet. The company was supported and funded by J. C. Williamson Theatres Ltd from 1944. Following Borovansky's death in 1959, the British dancer and administrator Dame Peggy van Praagh was invited to become artistic director of the company. J. C. Williamson Theatres Ltd decided to disband the Borovansky Ballet in 1961.

In 1961, J. C. Williamson Theatres Ltd and the Australian Elizabethan Theatre Trust received federal subsidy towards the establishment of a national ballet company. These organisations established the Australian Ballet Foundation to assist with the establishment of a new company, which in 1962 became the Australian Ballet. Peggy van Praagh, who had been kept on a retainer by J. C. Williamson Theatres Ltd through the intervening year between the disbanding of the Borovansky Ballet and the establishment of the Australian Ballet, was invited to become the founding artistic director of the company. The majority of the dancers employed by the fledgling company were drawn from former members of the Borovansky Ballet. The company was founded with a charter to use Australian choreographers and produce Australian work.

The first performance by the Australian Ballet was Tchaikovsky's Swan Lake, staged at Her Majesty's Theatre, Sydney on 2 November 1962. The principal dancers in the first season were Kathleen Gorham, Marilyn Jones, Garth Welch, and the Swedish-born Caj Selling (1935–2005). Van Praagh also invited the Royal Ballet's Ray Powell to temporarily become the company's first ballet master, with Leon Kellaway (brother of Cecil Kellaway), a former dancer with the Covent Garden Russian Ballet, as the company's first ballet teacher. In later years Sir Robert Helpmann, Marilyn Jones and Maina Gielgud made major contributions as artistic directors of the Australian Ballet.

In 1964, the first fully Australian performance, Helpmann's The Display was performed. In the same year, van Praagh established the Australian Ballet School, which was formed specially to train dancers for the company. Dame Margaret Scott was the founding director of the school, followed by Gailene Stock, Marilyn Rowe, and then Lisa Pavane, all three former company principal artists.

Choreographers including Graeme Murphy, Meryl Tankard, and Natalie Weir rose to prominence at TAB from the 1970s to the 1990s.

=== Former artistic directors ===
The company's previous artistic directors were:

- Dame Peggy van Praagh (1962–74; 1978)
- Sir Robert Helpmann (1965–76)
- Anne Woolliams (1976–77)
- Marilyn Jones (1979–82)
- Maina Gielgud (1983–96)
- Ross Stretton (1996–2001)
- David McAllister (2001-2021)

== Description and governance ==
The Australian Ballet (TAB) is based in Melbourne; its Southbank headquarters is the Primrose Potter Australian Ballet Centre, named after its long-term supporter Lady (Primrose) Potter. The company tours to mainland state capital cities within Australia, with annual seasons in Melbourne at the State Theatre (accompanied by Orchestra Victoria) and in Sydney at the Sydney Opera House accompanied by the Opera Australia Orchestra. Other venues are the Lyric Theatre at the Queensland Performing Arts Centre in Brisbane, and the Adelaide Festival Centre in Adelaide. The company also tours internationally.

The Australian Ballet works in close cooperation with the Australian Ballet School, of which many of the company's dancers are graduates.

The company's income is derived from box office sales, along with funding from the Australian, Victorian, and New South Wales governments; corporate sponsors; private donors; and bequests.

== People ==
Since 2021 and as of 2023 the company's artistic director is David Hallberg, who was a principal dancer with the American Ballet Theatre until 2020.

In December 2022, Lissa Twomey was appointed as Executive Director of the Company.

The music director and chief conductor of The Australian Ballet appointed in 2022 is Jonathan Lo, replacing Nicolette Fraillon, the world's only woman chief conductor of a ballet company.

== Dancers ==
The Australian Ballet has five levels within the company. They are (in ascending order): corps de ballet, coryphée, soloist, senior artist, and principal dancer.

== Telstra Ballet Dancer Award ==
The Telstra Ballet Dancer Awards have been made annually since 2003, in support of the aspirations of The Australian Ballet's elite young dancers. It is the biggest prize available specifically to a dancer in Australia, with a cash prize of $20,000 to the winner. The Telstra People's Choice Award is made to the most popular of the nominees in that year, using internet and SMS voting. The winner of the People's Choice receives a cash prize of $5,000.

== Notable performances ==
In 1964, Robert Helpmann's work The Display was the first TAB production in which the music, designer, theme, and choreographer were all Australian; included were Australian rules football, lyrebirds, and a picnic in the bush.

In 1992, Clara, an adaptation of The Nutcracker by choreographer Graeme Murphy, was a significant work, as he turned it into a story about migration to Australia.

In 1997, TAB commissioned Stephen Page, artistic director of Indigenous dance company Bangarra Dance Theatre, to choreograph a piece for dancers from both companies, which resulted in Rites, which was set to Igor Stravinsky's The Rite of Spring. For its 60th anniversary in 2023, TAB presented Identity, a double bill commissioned by Hallberg, which premiered in May 2023 at the Sydney Opera House before moving to Arts Centre Melbourne in June. The performance comprises two works: The Hum, composed by Yorta Yorta woman Deborah Cheetham Fraillon and with costumes designed by Taungurung designer Annette Sax (the first Indigenous women to perform these roles in a TAB production), by Wiradjuri choreographer Daniel Riley of ADT; and Paragon, by resident choreographer Alice Topp. While The Hum represents Indigenous dance, Paragon focuses on the history of The Australian Ballet.

== Company ==
Dancers with The Australian Ballet are:

=== Principal artists ===
Name	Nationality	Training	Joined TAB	Promoted to Principal	Other companies (incl. guest performances)
Dimity Azoury	Australia	Kim Harvey School of Dance in Canberra; The Australian Ballet School	2008	2019	
Benedicte Bemet	Australia	Ransley's Ballet Centre; Jean M. Wong School of Ballet; The Australian Ballet School	2012	2019	
Joseph Caley	United Kingdom	Skelton Hooper School of Dance; Royal Ballet School	2022	N/A Joined as Principal	Birmingham Royal Ballet; English National Ballet
Brett Chynoweth	Australia	The Australian Ballet School	2009	2018	Nederlands Dans Theatre; Birmingham Royal Ballet
Chengwu Guo	China	Beijing Dance Academy; The Australian Ballet School	2008	2013	
Robyn Hendricks	South Africa	The Australian Ballet School; National Ballet School	2005	2016	
Ako Kondo	Japan	Shiho Kanazawa Ballet Studio; The Royal Ballet School’s International Summer School; The Australian Ballet School	2010	2015	
Callum Linnane	Australia	Ballarat Centre of Music and the Arts; The Australian Ballet School	2015	2022	
Marcus Morelli	Australia	Jane Moore Academy of Ballet; The Australian Ballet School	2014	2023	
Jill Ogai	Australia	The Australian Ballet School	2012	2023	
Sharni Spencer	New Zealand	Sally Kefts School of Dance; Marie Walton Mahon Dance Academy; New Zealand School of Dance	2008	2022	

=== Senior Artists ===
Name	Nationality	Training	Joined TAB	Promoted to Soloist	Other companies (incl. guest performances)
Imogen Chapman	Australia	The Australian Ballet School; Royal Ballet School	2011	2022	Scottish Ballet
Jarryd Madden	Australia	Melbourne’s National Theatre Ballet School	2008	2017	
Rina Nemoto	Japan	trained with Daini Kudo and Dominique Khalfouni	2011	2022	The Royal Ballet
Valerie Tereshchenko	Ukraine	West Point Ballet Academy; Ballet Theatre of Victoria; Australian International School of Coaching; The Australian Ballet School	2009	2018	
Jade Wood	Australia	Jillanne Reynolds School of Dance; The Australian Ballet School	2011	2018	
Yuumi Yamada	Japan	Sakurai Classical Ballet Studio; The Australian Ballet School	2017	2023	

=== Soloists ===
- Mishi Barkidjija
- Isobelle Dashwood
- Victor Estevez
- Ingrid Gow
- Mia Heathcote
- Cameron Holmes
- Brodie James
- Mason Lovegrove
- Jake Mangakahia
- Luke Marchant
- Davi Ramos
- Katherine Sonnekus
- Aya Watanabe
- Lucien Xu
- Maxim Zenin

=== Coryphées ===
- Sara Andrlon
- Timothy Coleman
- Saranja Crowe
- Hugo Dumapit
- Adam Elmes
- Evie Ferris
- Rohan Furnell
- Lillia Harvey
- Drew Hedditch
- Larissa Kiyoto-Ward
- Riley Lapham
- Montana Rubin

=== Corps de ballet ===
- Karina Arimura
- Mio Bayly
- Henry Berlin
- Harrison Bradley
- Matthew Bradwell
- Daniel Bryne
- Grace Carroll
- Jacob De Groot
- Thomas Gannon
- Benjamin Garrett
- Corey Gavan
- Serena Graham
- Laura Griffiths
- Jeremy Hargreaves
- Alain Juelg
- Bryce Latham
- Lilly Maskery
- Alice McArthur
- Samara Merrick
- Jett Ramsay
- Joseph Romancewicz
- Amy Ronnfeldt
- Hannah Sergi
- Isabella Smith
- Charlton Tough
- Macy Trethewey
- Elijah Trevitt
- Belle Urwin
- Alexandra Walton
- Yichuan Wang
- Annabelle Watt
- Yaru Xu

== Orchestra Victoria ==
Following a period of turmoil, Orchestra Victoria became a wholly owned subsidiarity of The Australian Ballet in July 2014

== See also ==
- Australian Archives of the Dance, created by TAB in 1972
