= Jane Scott (film producer) =

British-born Australian film producer

Jane Scott is a British-born Australian film producer.

Scott was born in Epsom, Surrey. From a background in magazine journalism in the UK, she started out in the film industry at The British Film Institute Production Board working for three years as Production Coordinator.

In 1972 Scott began her association with Australian film-making with Bruce Beresford on The Adventures of Barry McKenzie, setting up the production in London and completing the film in Australia. Jane returned to Australia in 1973 for Reg Grundy Enterprises to work on a number of productions and again in 1974 as associate producer on Barry Mckenzie Holds His Own.

Over more than thirty years in the film industry Scott has worked on a number of feature films, television productions and television commercials. Titles of some of the films she has been involved with include My Brilliant Career, Crocodile Dundee, Crocodile Dundee II, and Strictly Ballroom.

Shine, which Scott produced in 1996, received worldwide acclaim and a large number of local and international awards and nominations including nine AFI Awards and seven nominations at the 1996 Academy Awards with Geoffrey Rush winning the Best Actor Oscar. As well as being nominated herself for an Academy Award, a Golden Globe and a BAFTA as the producer of Shine, Scott was also nominated for the Darryl F. Zanuck Theatrical Motion Picture Producer of the Year Award (1996) by the Producers Guild of America.

Scott's next feature, Head On directed by Ana Kokkinos, was officially selected for screening at the 30th Quinzaine des Réalisateurs (Directors' Fortnight), 1998 Cannes Film Festival and also received critical acclaim with its Australian and international release. More recently, Love's Brother, an Italian love story, written and directed by Jan Sardi, won the Grand Prize at the Heartland Film Festival, Indianapolis.

Scott is currently developing two films adapted from books – A Suitable Boy by Vikram Seth, and Mao's Last Dancer by Li Cunxin, adapted by screenwriter Jan Sardi, due to commence shooting early 2008 with Bruce Beresford directing.

According to Australia's Inside Film magazine:

"The $25.8 million budget of Mao's Last Dancer was financed via the now defunct 10BA scheme, which provided private investors with a 100 per cent tax deduction.

Mao's Last Dancer is now the twelfth biggest Australian film of all time at the local box office – passing Lantana this week – with $12,586,534 in total takings."

== Select films ==
- Barry McKenzie Holds His Own (1974) - associate producer
- Oz (1976) - associate producer
- Storm Boy (1976) - associate producer
- The Sound of Love (1977) - producer
- In Search of Anna (1978) - production manager
- Harvest of Hate (1978) - producer
- My Brilliant Career (1979) - production supervisor, associate producer
- Harlequin (1980) - associate producer
- That Dangerous Summer (1980) - producer
- The Survivor (1981) - associate producer
- Goodbye Paradise (1983) - producer
- Winners (1985) - producer
- Crocodile Dundee (1986) - line producer
- Echoes of Paradise (1987) - producer
- Danger Down Under (1988) - producer
- Crocodile Dundee II (1988) - producer
- Boys in the Island (1989) - producer
- Boys from the Bush (1991–92) - producer
- Strictly Ballroom (1992) - line producer
- The Tommyknockers (1993) - producer
- Shine (1996) - producer
- Under the Lighthouse Dancing (1997) - line producer
- Head On (1998) - producer
- Love's Brother (2004) - producer
- Mao's Last Dancer (2009) - producer
