= Mao's Last Dancer =

Mao's Last Dancer may refer to:

- Mao's Last Dancer (book), an autobiography written by Li Cunxin
- Mao's Last Dancer (film), a 2009 film directed by Bruce Beresford
