= Charles Foster (attorney) =

American lawyer

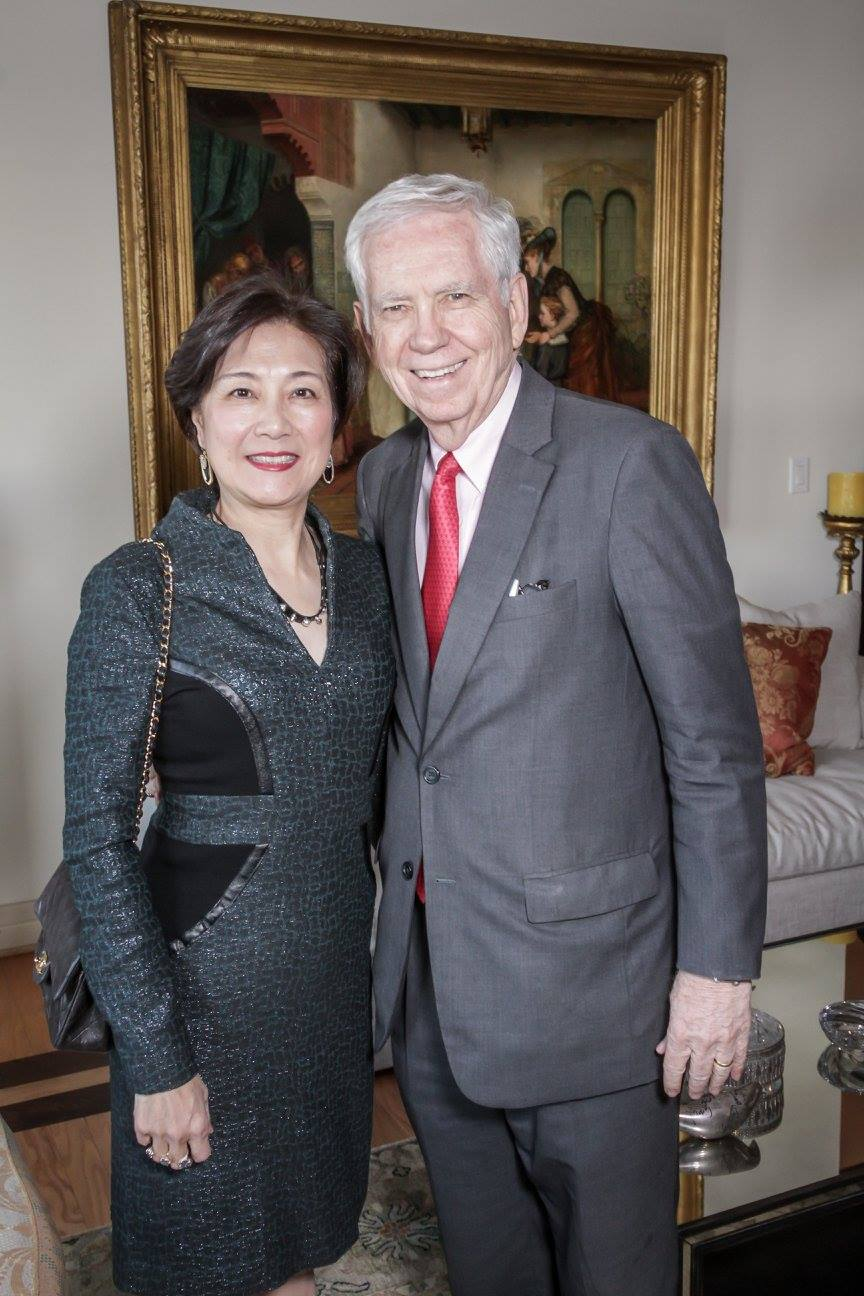
Charles and Lily Foster

Charles C. Foster is an American immigration attorney and chairman of the Houston-based law firm Foster LLP. Foster has earned top awards from organizations including Chambers and Partners, Texas Monthly magazine, and the American Immigration Law Foundation. He also serves as the honorary consul general of the Kingdom of Thailand in Houston and has received four royal decorations from His Majesty, King Bhumibol Adulyadej of Thailand.

In addition to his work as an attorney, Foster's past activities include a membership on the Bush-Cheney Presidential Transition Committee for the Department of Justice in 2001, a position as a senior immigration policy advisor for the George W. Bush presidential campaigns in both 2000 and 2004, and an immigration policy advisory role in Barack Obama's 2008 presidential campaign. His political contributions also include testimonies before the U.S. House and Senate subcommittees on immigration.

Foster is best known for his role in helping ballet performer Li Cunxin stay in the United States over the objections of Chinese Communist Party officials, which was memorialized in Cunxin's autobiography Mao's Last Dancer and later in a film by the same name.

== Mao’s Last Dancer ==
Foster played a pivotal role in preventing Houston ballet performer Li Cunxin from being forcibly repatriated to Communist China. After performing for the Houston Ballet, Cunxin decided that he wished to stay in the United States. Cunxin, aware of the potentially severe political implications of this action, hired Foster as his immigration attorney. Upon informing officials at the Chinese Consulate of his decision, Cunxin was forcibly detained and prepared for repatriation back to China. Foster worked tirelessly behind the scenes to keep his client in the United States, contacting senior U.S. officials and convincing a Houston federal judge to issue a restraining order. After a 21-hour ordeal, Cunxin was ultimately allowed to stay in the United States at the expense of his Chinese citizenship.

== Personal life ==
Foster was born in Galveston, Texas. He earned both his bachelor's degree and Juris Doctor at the University of Texas at Austin. He is active in several community organizations, including serving on the boards of InterFaith Ministries, the Houston Ballet, the Hobby Center for Public Policy, the International Institute of Education – Southern Region, and Neighborhood Centers, Inc. He was recognized with the Refugee Services Humanitarian Award in November 2010.

Foster holds and has held a number of positions at professional and philanthropic organizations. He is the former president of the American Immigration Lawyers Association, the founding chairman of the State Bar of Texas Immigration and Nationality Law Section, past chair of the American Bar Association Coordinating Committee on Immigration Law, and past vice chairman of the Houston Bar Foundation. He is board member of Americans for Immigration Reform, vice chairman of the George H. W. Bush Foundation for U.S. China Relations, board member of the Houston Ballet, board member of the Holocaust Museum - Houston, board member for the Hobby School of Public Affairs, executive committee of the Greater Houston Partnership (and former chairman of its Economic Development and World Trade Divisions), board member and past chairman of the Asia Society – Texas Center, former trustee at the Asia Society – New York, and board member and past chairman of the Inter Faith Ministries of Greater Houston. Foster is also past chairman of the Houston International Festival, and former president of the Houston Forum and Houston Club. He also initiated and co-chaired the George H. W. Bush and James Baker monuments in Sesquicentennial Park, Houston.

Foster currently resides in Houston, Texas. He is married with four children.
