= OON =

Oon or OON may refer to:

- Oon Brothers, Malaysian badminton players
- Oberösterreichische Nachrichten (OÖN), an Austrian newspaper
- Önge language, a language of the Andaman Islands
- Order of Orange-Nassau
- Officer of the Order of the Niger
- Oon, a Chinese surname
