= Sun Rui =

Sun Rui is the name of:

- Sun Rui (footballer, born 1978), Chinese female association footballer
- Sun Rui (footballer, born 1999), Chinese male association footballer
- Sun Rui (ice hockey) (born 1982), Chinese female ice hockey player
- Sun Rui (dancer) (born 1984), Chinese male dancer
- Sun Rui (singer) (born 1995), Chinese female singer and actress
