= Nulla in mundo pax sincera =

Sacred motet by Antonio Vivaldi

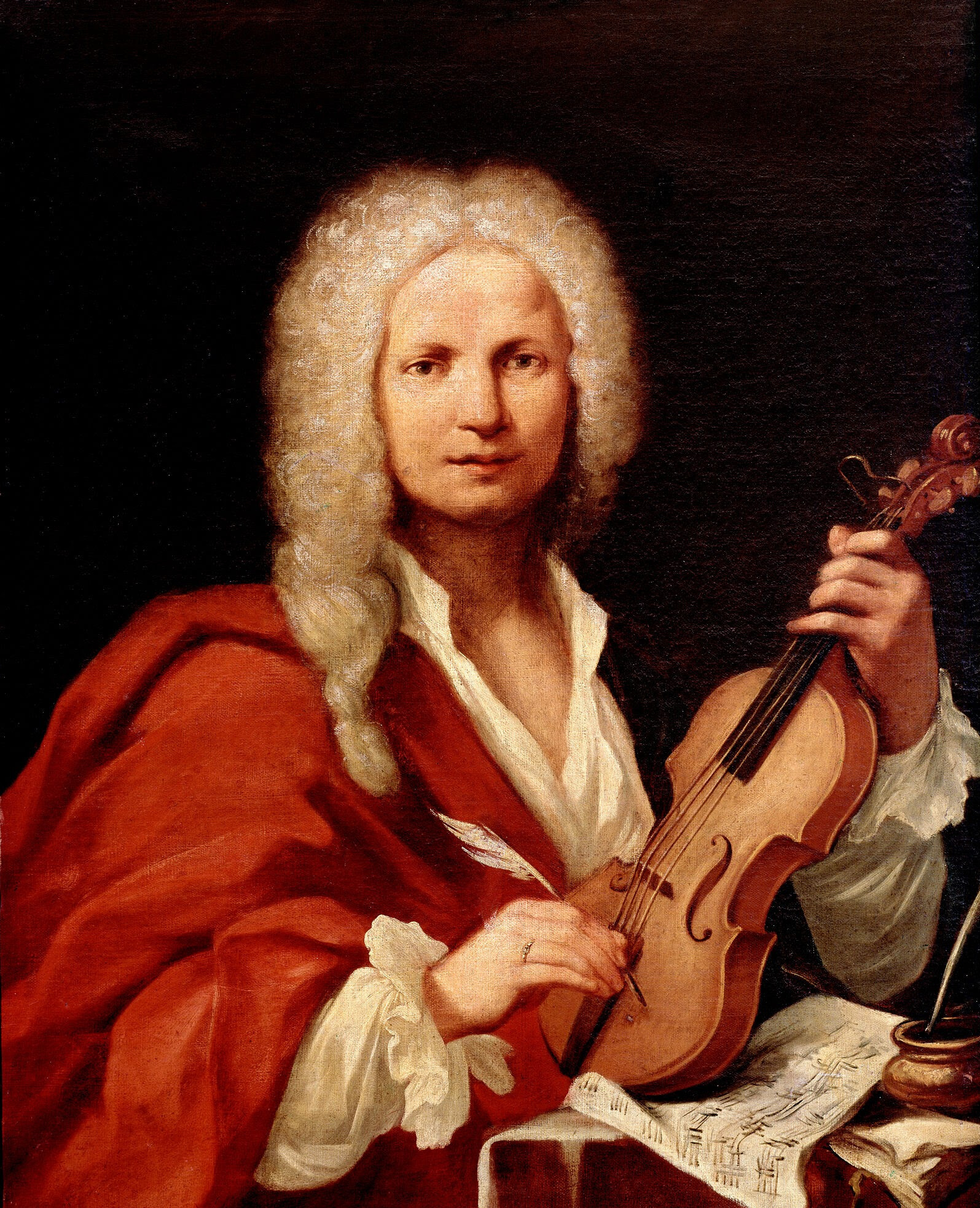
Probable portrait of Antonio Vivaldi, c. 1723

Nulla in mundo pax sincera (RV 630)
1. Larghetto

2. Recitativ

3. Allegro
Performed by the Advent Chamber Orchestra with soprano Cristina Piccardi

Nulla in mundo pax sincera, RV 630, is a sacred motet composed by Antonio Vivaldi around 1713–1719 to an anonymous Latin text, the title of which may be translated as "In this world there is no honest peace" or "There is no true peace in this world without bitterness".

Written in the key of E major and in the typical lyrical Italian Baroque style, it is scored for solo soprano, two violins, viola and basso continuo, this would normally be a cello and keyboard instrument, in Vivaldi's case often the organ. The text dwells on the imperfections of a world full of evil and sin, and praises Jesus for the salvation he offers from it.

The motet consists of three parts (Aria; Recitative; Aria), followed by a concluding Alleluia. Scholar and Vivaldi expert Michael Talbot wrote that it has "a ravishing central recitative." However, Talbot (2006) also notes that this whole piece "fail[s] to achieve the psychological penetration of a cantata such as Quad per ignoto calle." A full performance of the piece takes approximately 13 minutes.

== Text ==
Aria.

Nulla in mundo pax sincera
sine felle; pura et vera,
dulcis Jesu, est in te.

Inter poenas et tormenta
vivit anima contenta
casti amoris sola spe.

Recitative.

Blando colore oculos mundus decepit
at occulto vulnere corda conficit;
fugiamus ridentem, vitemus sequentem,
nam delicias ostentando arte secura
vellet ludendo superare.

Aria.

Spirat anguis
inter flores et colores
explicando tegit fel.
Sed occulto factus ore
homo demens in amore
saepe lambit quasi mel.

Alleluia.

Aria.

In this world there is no honest peace
free from bitterness; pure and true (i.e. peace)
sweet Jesus, lies in Thee.

Amidst punishment and torment
lives the contented soul,
chaste love its only hope.

Recitative.

This world deceives the eye by surface charms,
but corroded hearts with hidden wounds.
Let us flee him who smiles, shun him who follows us,
for by skilfully displaying its pleasures, this world
overwhelms us by deceit.

Aria.

The serpent's hiss conceals its venom,
as it uncoils itself
among blossoms and beauty.
But with a furtive touch of the lips,
a man maddened by love
will often kiss as if licking honey.

Alleluia.

== In popular culture ==
The first aria, sung by Jane Edwards, was featured in the 1996 film Shine.

== Media ==
- The instrumental version of Nulla in mundo pax sincera is used as the song for the phonograph in the video game We Need to Go Deeper
