= Sun Rui (dancer) =

Chinese classical dancer (born 1984)

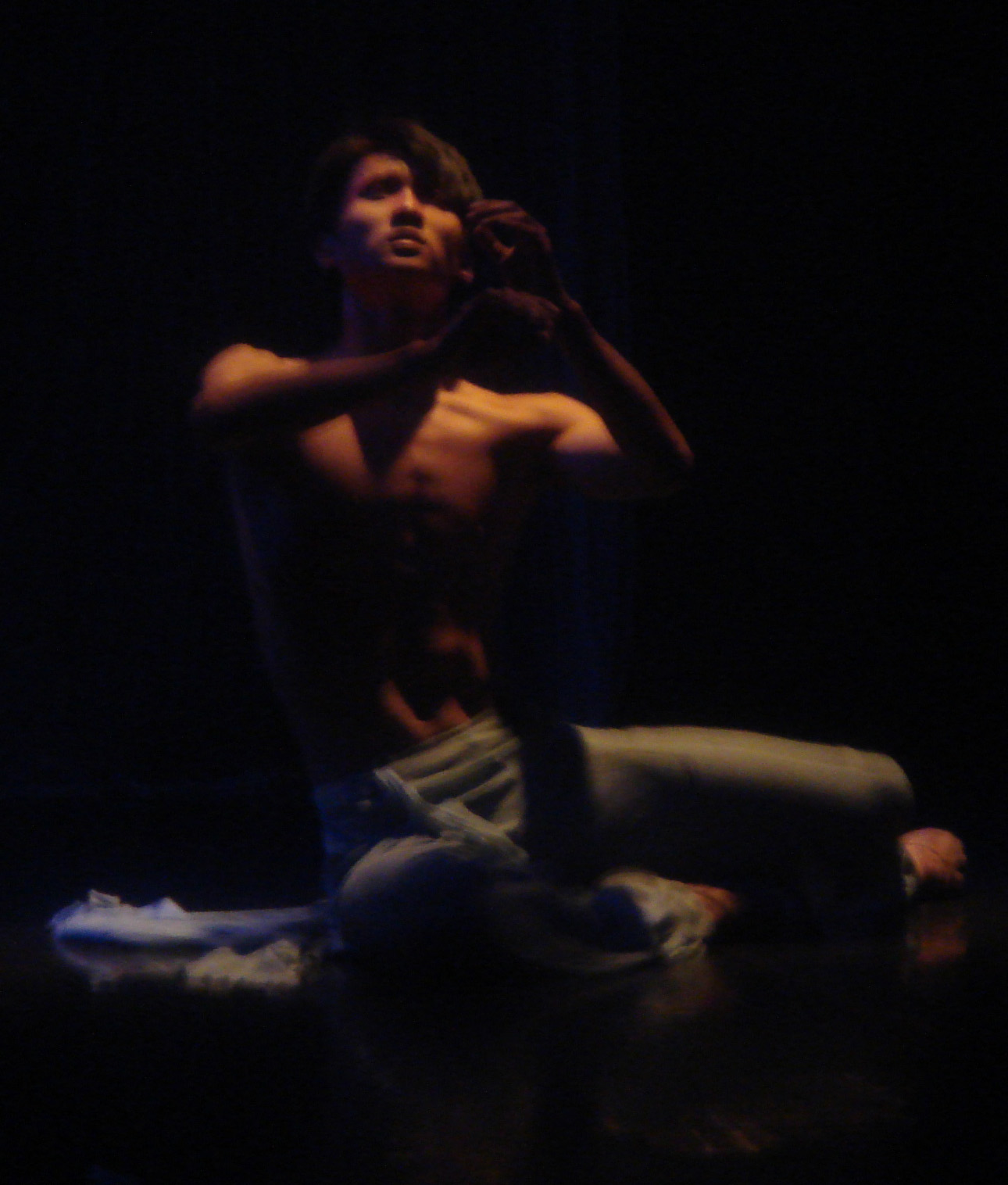
- Born: November 9, 1984 (age 40); Hubei, China
- Occupation: Dancer
- Years active: 2000-present

Chinese name
- Traditional Chinese: 孫銳
- Simplified Chinese: 孙锐
Transcriptions

Sun Rui (Chinese: 孙锐) is a Chinese classical dancer. He was born on November 9, 1984, in Wuhan, Hubei Province, China. He is now a classical dancer of Beijing Dance Academy Youth Troupe and a performer of Beijing Contemporary Dance Theatre.

== Early life ==
Sun Rui started to practice dancing at the age of 6, and was admitted to the Secondary School of Beijing Dance Academy at the age of 10. Since then, he had to leave his family and live by himself as the school is in Beijing, which is thousands of kilometers away from his hometown. As the only kid, this was a huge decision to both him and his family. Although painful, he survived loneliness and tough training in the school. Later, he continued with his bachelor of Chinese classical dance at Beijing Dance Academy, one of the best dance institutions in China.

== Career ==
After his graduation from Beijing Dance Academy in 2005, Sun Rui joined Beijing Dance Academy Youth Troupe as a classical dancer. In 2008, he joined Beijing Contemporary Dance Theatre. Because of his outstanding dancing skills and styles, Sun Rui showed up in numerous performances both nationally and internationally.

=== Selected National Performances ===
- Sep 2005: dance show ‘Song of Phoenix’ (凤鸣和祥), lead dancer, opening ceremony of the 17th Dalian Fashion Festival
- Jan 2006: dance ‘Youth Melody’ (青春旋律), 2006 Beijing Spring Festival Gala by Beijing TV
- Jan 2006: dance ‘Passion of Spring’ (春的激情), 'Harmonious Homes' TV Spring Festival Gala 2006 by Chinese Ministry of Culture
- Jul 2006: CCTV ‘Graduation Song’ Entertainment Show 2006 by Chinese art schools
- Dec 2006 – Apr 2007: Han Dynasty dance poem ‘Song of the Big Wind’ (大风歌) by Beijing Dance Academy Youth Troupe, plays ‘Fan Zeng’ (范增)
- May 2007: dance show ‘Pine and Bamboo’ (竹松), lead dancer, ‘Legend of Rocks, Mount Hua’ Show Night
- Nov 2007: dance show 'Harmony of Heaven and Earth' (天地和鸣), lead dancer, opening ceremony of the 8th China Arts Festival
- Mar 2008: dance drama 'Tang Wan' (唐琬) by Beijing Dance Academy
- May 2008: dance show ‘Immortal at the Magpie Bridge’ (鹊桥仙), ‘Poems and Songs of the Song Dynasty’ – Charity Night for the Wenchuan Earthquake
- Nov 2008: dance solo ‘Chant of the Yellow River’ (长河吟), ‘Soul of Dance’ Theme Show – Exhibition Week of Art Schools
- Nov 2008: dance solo ‘Ocean Waves’ (海浪), ‘30th Anniversary of Reform and Opening Up of China’ Top Dance Shows
- Dec 2008: modern ballet drama 'Space Diary' (空间日记) by Beijing Contemporary Dance Theatre, 6th Beijing International Theater Dance Festival
- Jan 2009: dance show 'Butterfly Love for Flowers' (蝶恋花), lead dancer, CCTV Spring Festival Gala 09
- Feb-Apr 2009: contemporary dance drama 'Stirred from a Dream' (惊梦) by Beijing Contemporary Dance Theatre, plays Liu Mengmei (柳梦梅), leading role

=== Selected International Performances ===
- Nov 2005: dance show ‘Drum Dance of China’ (鼓舞中国), ‘Beijing Olympics 1000 Days Countdown & Disclosure of Olympic Mascots’ Ceremony, Beijing, China
- May 2007: tour with Beijing Dance Academy Youth Troupe, Sydney, Australia
- Aug 2007: tour with Beijing Dance Academy Youth Troupe, Japan
- Dec 2007: dance solo 'Debut' (粉墨登场), 'Special Spirit in China' Award and Entertainment Show, Shanghai, China
- May 2008: dance solo 'Debut' (粉墨登场), 'China Night' at the 60th Festival de Cannes, France
- Dec 2008: modern ballet drama 'Space Diary' (空间日记) by Beijing Contemporary Dance Theatre, United Arab Emirates

== Dancing Style ==
Sun Rui's dancing style is unique and outstanding. His height, 183 cm, and flexible body (partially due to long-time hard training) enable him to display both strength and flexibility in his dance. Other than that, he mixes rhythmic gymnastics and ballet into his classical dancing, and makes it more aesthetic. He is also involved and excels in contemporary dance.

== Awards ==
=== Chinese Classical Dance ===
Since his early years, Sun Rui started to stand out of classical dancers of his age and win multiple awards in the national competitions. In 2000, at the age of 16, he won silver in the junior group of the 6th 'Peach & Plum Cup' Dance Competition (桃李杯), which is one of the highest-level dance competitions in China. His performance in that competition, 'Little Boy' (小儿郎), is so successful that it has been repeated by many juveniles in all kinds of dance competitions since then. In 2003, by the dance 'Bamboo Dream' (竹梦), he won silver in the classical dance category (senior group) of the 7th 'Peach & Plum Cup' Dance Competition (桃李杯). In 2005, his another version of 'Bamboo Dream' (竹梦) won him silver in the classical dance category of the 3rd CCTV Dance Competition. In 2005, his presentation of 'Plum' (梅) was awarded bronze in the classical dance category and gold in performing category of the 5th 'Lotus' Dance Competition of China.

=== Contemporary Dance ===
In addition to classical dance, he also received awards for his contemporary dance. In 2007, his solo dance 'Chant of the Yellow River' (长河吟) brought him the 'Wen Hua' award (文华奖) (the highest honor awarded to dancers in China) in the 7th National Dance Competition. In 2008, he finished first in the contemporary dance event and third in the mixed finale of the 7th Premio Roma Concorso Internazionale di Danza, Italy.

== Car Accident ==
Months after Sun Rui won his first national dance award, a tragedy struck him. In Feb 2001, a car accident happened to him and some other junior dancers when he was on a tour with the Secondary School of Beijing Dance Academy in the United States. Although he survived the tragic accident, his pelvis was fractured. As this part of bone is critical to a dancer, his dancing career seemed to be doomed. However, Sun Rui did not give up. After painful rehabilitation and even harder training, he stood on the stage again. His journeys to the podiums of various national and international dance competitions resumed.

== Popularity ==
Although Sun Rui is well-known within the dance communities and small groups of dance fans, his name was not familiar to the audience for long time. In Jan of 2009, he was chosen as the lead dancer of the dance 'Butterfly Love for Flowers' (蝶恋花) in the CCTV Spring Festival Gala. His performance showed the life of a butterfly and its love for flowers. 'Butterfly Love for Flowers' was later voted by the national audience as 'My Favorite Dancing and Singing Show' of the CCTV Spring Festival Gala 09. Since then, his popularity expands from the dance communities and dance fans to more and more Chinese audience.

== Other activities ==
- ‘Chant of the Yellow River’, Sun Rui (performer). (2007). Journal of Beijing Dance Academy.
- Course of Sword Dance in Chinese Classical Dance (VCD). Editor: Hu Wei. Invited performer: Sun Rui.
- Basic training course teacher, Secondary School of Beijing Dance Academy, 2007-2008.
