= The Sound of Love =

- Based on: screenplay by Lew Hunter
- Written by: John Power
- Directed by: John Power
- Starring: John Jarratt; George Ogilvie
- Country of origin: Australia
- Original language: English

Production
- Producer: Jane Scott
- Running time: 75 minutes
- Production company: South Australian Film Corporation
- Budget: $105,000

Original release
- Network: Nine Network
- Release: 1977

The Sound of Love is a 1977 Australian television film directed by John Power and starring John Jarratt and George Ogilvie. Its plot concerns a deaf mechanic who falls in love with a mute girl.
