= Wēn =

Chinese family name

Wen is a Chinese surname. simplified Chinese: 温; traditional Chinese: 溫; pinyin: Wēn), meaning "warm", is sometimes romanised as Wen or Vun in Taiwan, Ôn in Vietnamese Wan in Cantonese, or Wen/Won/Wan/Bong/Voon/Oon/Woon/Man/Mun in Malaysia. According to a 2013 study it was found to be the 104th-most common surname, shared by 2,170,000 people or 0.160% of the population, with the province with the most people being Guangdong.

== Origins ==
- from Wen (溫), the name of an ancient state during the Western Zhou dynasty. During the Spring and Autumn period this state was annexed by Di and the Prince of Wen fled to the state of Wey (simplified Chinese: 卫; traditional Chinese: 衞). His descendants acquired then name of their origins state as their surname.
- from the place-name Wen (溫), a fief granted to Wen Ji (溫季), an official in Jin during the Spring and Autumn period
- from the Chi Wen (叱溫), Wen Pen (溫盆), and Wen Gu (溫孤) families of the Xianbei people
- from the personal name of Wen Sheng (溫昇), who went into exile and changed his original surname, Liu (劉), to Wen after his father, Liu Yicong (劉易從), an official in the Tang dynasty, suffered persecution and death.

== Notable people ==
- Wen Jiao (溫嶠) (288–329), courtesy name Taizhen (太真), formally Duke Zhongwu of Shi'an (始安忠武公), was a renowned Jin Dynasty (266–420) general and governor.
- Wen Dalin (575–637), courtesy name Yanbo,[1] better known as Wen Yanbo, posthumously known as Duke Gong of Yu, was a Chinese official who lived in the early Tang Dynasty
- Ming-Na Wen (溫明娜; born 1963) a Chinese–American actress
- Wen Tingyun (812–870), Tang dynasty poet
- Wen Yang (chess player) (温阳; born 1988) Chinese chess player who became China's 25th Grandmaster
- Wen Jiabao (born 1942), Premier of the People's Republic of China from 2003 to 2013
- Wen Junfeng (温俊峰; 1929–2025), Chinese aircraft engine designer
- Deric Wan (born 1964), Hong Kong actor and singer
- Wen Hui (born 1960), Chinese dancer and choreographer
- Irene Wan (born 1967), Hong Kong actress
- James Wan (born 1977), Australian filmmaker
- Leana Wen (born 1983), Chinese-born American physician
- Wen Shang-yi (Monster) (溫尚翊; born 1976), is one of the two guitarists and leader of the Taiwanese rock band, Mayday
- Oon Shu An (温淑安; born 1986), Singaporean actress and host
- Walter Woon Cheong Ming (温长明; born 1956), Singaporean judge and former attorney-general of Singapore
- Woon Sui Kut (温瑞吉; 1929–2013), Singaporean sports official
- Woon Swee Oan (溫瑞安; born 1954), Malaysian writer
- Woon Khe Wei (温可微; born 1989), Malaysian badminton player
