= Chi Cao =

British ballet dancer (born 1978)

Chi Cao (Chinese: 曹驰; pinyin: Cáo Chí; b. March 22, 1978) is a British ballet dancer born in China.

== Early life ==
Cao was born in Shanghai, the son of a dance teacher and a musician. When he was four years old, the family moved to Beijing. He received training in classical dance at the Beijing Dance Academy, where his father was director.

== Career ==
In 1993, he won a scholarship to train at the Royal Ballet School in London. Two years later, in 1995, he became a member of the Birmingham Royal Ballet. In 1998 he won the Gold Medal at the Varna International Ballet Competition. Together with his long-time dance partner Nao Sakuma, he represented the company, among other things, at the NATO gala in 2000 in Birmingham and the Golden Jubilee of Elizabeth II in 2002. In June 2018, he ended his long career with Birmingham Royal Ballet.

== Film ==
Cao portrayed the Chinese ballet dancer Li Cunxin in the biographical film Mao's Last Dancer (2009). For this role he was nominated for Best Actor in the Inside Film Awards. Li Cunxin himself had recommended Chi Cao for this role because he knew his father.
