= Beijing Dance Academy =

Dance school in Beijing, China

- 北京舞蹈学院
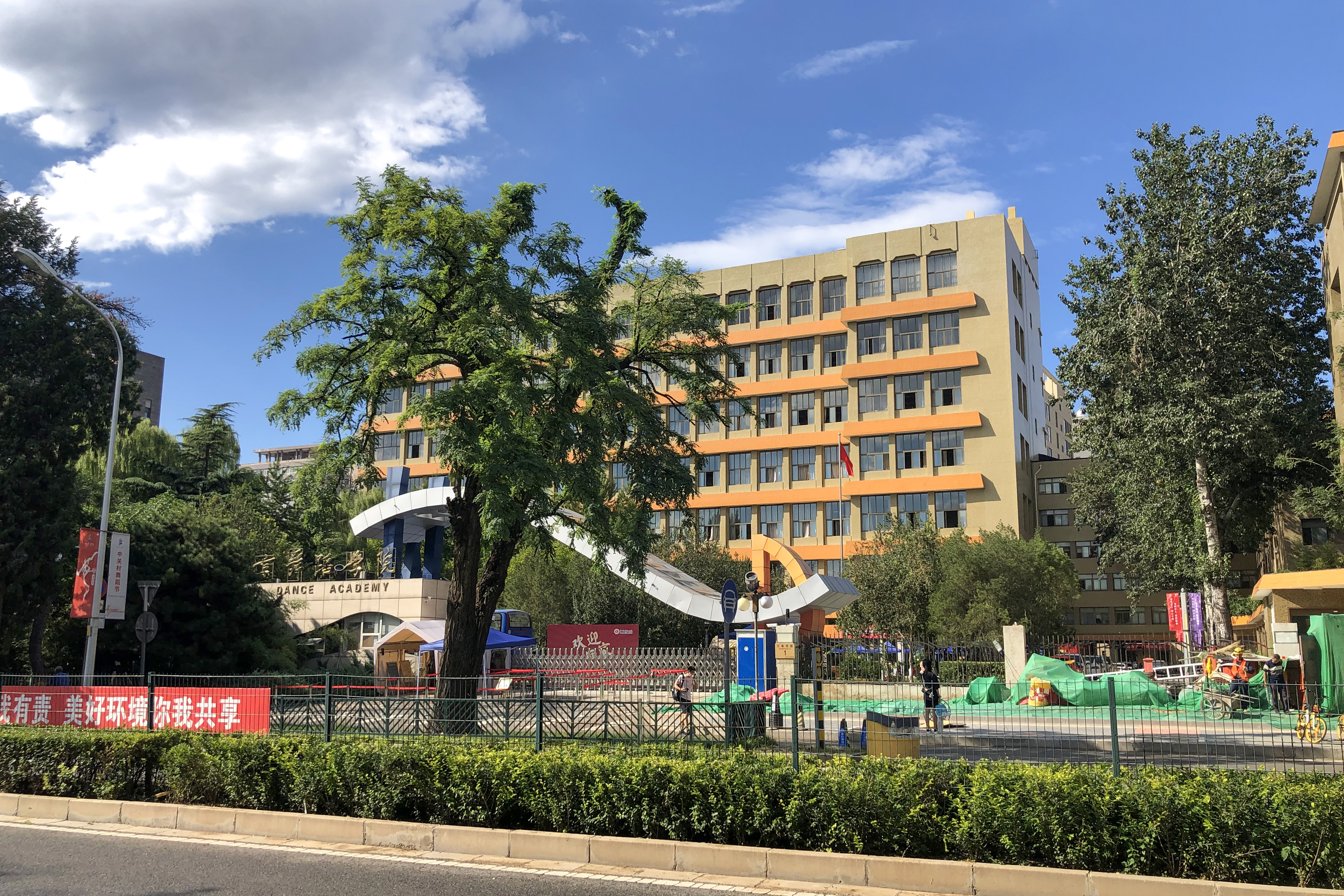
- Type: Public
- Established: 1954; 72 years ago
- Parent institution: Beijing Municipal People's Government
- President: Xu Rui (许锐)
- Location: Haidian District, Beijing, China
- Campus: Urban
- Website: www.bda.edu.cn

The Beijing Dance Academy (BDA, Chinese: 北京舞蹈学院) is a municipal public professional dance college at Haidian, Beijing. The academy is the highest institution for dance education and assessment in the People's Republic of China, conducting the nationwide teacher qualification level examinations in Chinese dance.

The Beijing Dance Academy was established as the Beijing Dance School (Chinese: 北京舞蹈学校) in 1954, and turned into the Beijing Dance Academy with the approval of State Council and the sponsorship of the Ministry of Culture in 1978. In 2000, its sponsorship was transferred to the Beijing Municipal People's Government. The Academy provides BA and MA degrees and has become the only institution of higher learning for professional dance education in China.

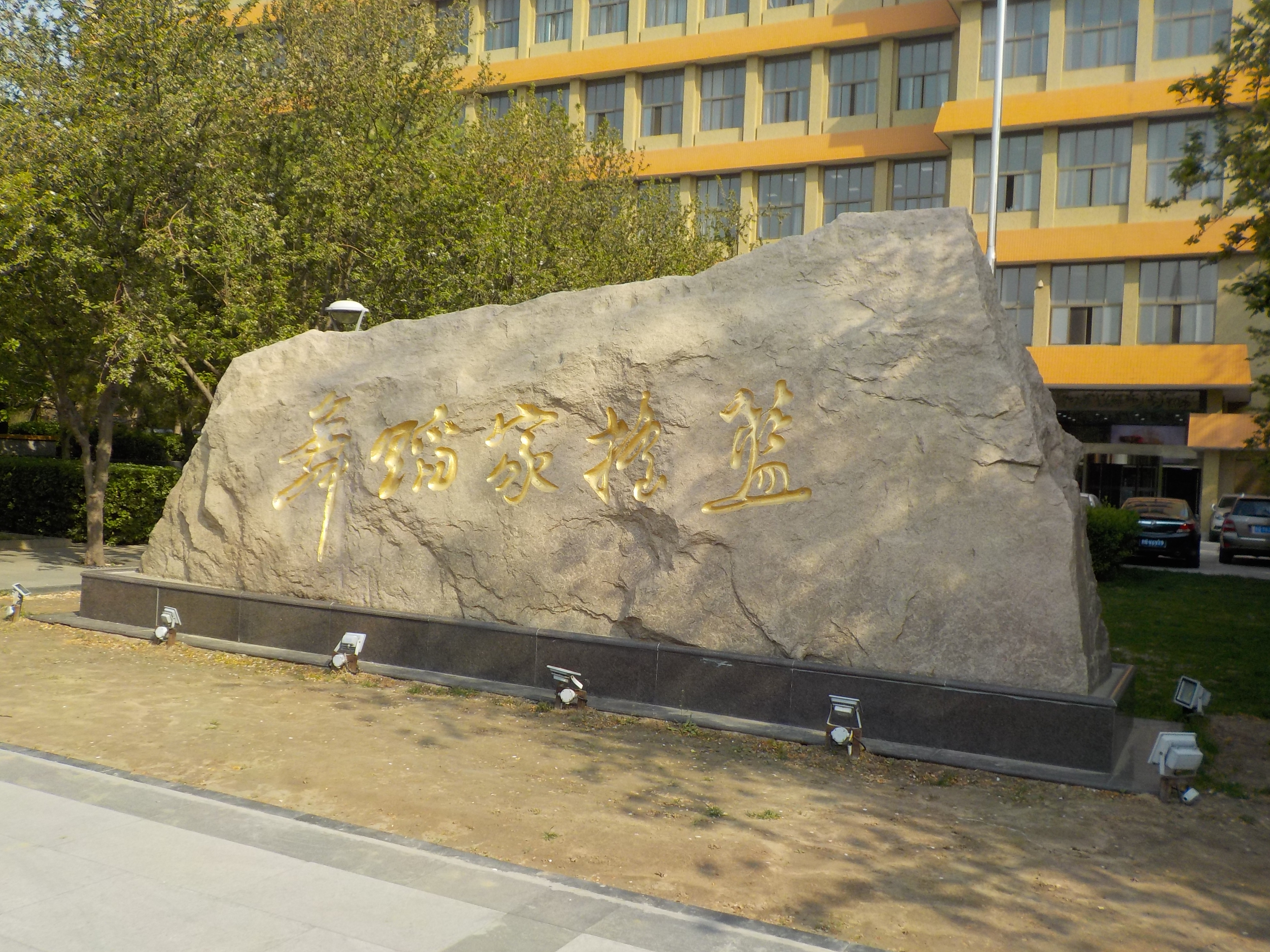
Words meaning "the Cradles of Dancers" inside the campus of Beijing Dance Academy.

The Academy, known as "the Cradle of Dancers" (Chinese: 舞蹈家的摇篮) and adjacent to Zizhuyuan Park, Haidian District, has over 500 faculty and staff, and over 2,000 full-time students. The Chinese government provides significant funding to the Academy and directly oversees its operations.

== Notable alumni ==
- An Yuexi (born 1989), actress
- Ayanga (born 1989) actor, singer, and songwriter of Mongol ethnicity
- Chi Cao (born 1978), Chinese-born British ballet dancer
- Li Cunxin (born 1961), Chinese-Australian retired ballet dancer, stockbroker and artistic director
- Elena Gutiérrez (born 1944), Costa Rican-Chilean ballet dancer and choreographer
- Chengwu Guo, ballet dancer
- Gina Jin (born 1990), actress
- Huang Xuan (born 1985), actor
- Jiang Mengjie (born 1989), actress
- Li Yitong (born 1990), actress and singer
- Liu Shishi (born 1987), actress
- Liu Yan (born 1982), classical dancer, choreographer, theatre director and professor
- Victoria Song (born 1987), singer, dancer, actress, model, host, author and member of f(x)
- Wan Peng (born 1996), actress
- Wang Likun (born 1985), actress and dancer
- Wei Wang, ballet dancer and principal dancer at the San Francisco Ballet
- Wang Yan, (born 1974) actress
- Wang Yijin (born 1996), idol, actress and member of BonBon Girls 303
- Wang Yuwen (born 1997), actress
- Wen Hui (born 1960) dancer, choreographer, and filmmaker
- Lulu Xuan (born 1991), actress
- Zhang Huiwen (born 1993), actress
- Zhang Yifan, idol, actress and member of BonBon Girls 303
- Zhang Ziyi (born 1979), actress
- Zhao Xiaotang, idol, actress and former member of The9
- Zheng Yunlong (born 1990), actor
