= Shine (film) =

1996 film by Scott Hicks

- Theatrical release poster
- Directed by: Scott Hicks
- Screenplay by: Jan Sardi
- Story by: Scott Hicks
- Produced by: Jane Scott
- Starring: Armin Mueller-Stahl; Noah Taylor; Geoffrey Rush; Lynn Redgrave; Googie Withers; Sonia Todd; John Gielgud
- Cinematography: Geoffrey Simpson
- Edited by: Pip Karmel
- Music by: David Hirschfelder
- Production companies: Australian Film Finance Corporation; Pandora Cinema; South Australian Film Corporation; British Broadcasting Corporation; Film Victoria; Momentum Films
- Distributed by: Ronin Films; Roadshow Entertainment
- Release dates: 21 January 1996 (Sundance); 15 August 1996 (Australia); 22 November 1996 (United States)
- Running time: 105 minutes
- Country: Australia
- Language: English
- Budget: $6 million
- Box office: $36 million

Shine is a 1996 Australian biographical psychological drama film directed by Scott Hicks from a screenplay by Jan Sardi, based on the life of David Helfgott, a pianist who suffered a mental breakdown and spent years in institutions. The film stars Geoffrey Rush and Noah Taylor as the adult and adolescent Helfgott, respectively, while Armin Mueller-Stahl, Lynn Redgrave, and John Gielgud appear in supporting roles.

Shine had its world premiere at the Sundance Film Festival on January 21, 1996, followed by a theatrical release in Australia on August 15. At the 69th Academy Awards, the film was nominated for seven awards including Best Picture, with Rush winning Best Actor.

== Plot ==
A man wanders through a heavy rainstorm, finding his way into a nearby restaurant. The restaurant's employees try to determine if he needs help. Despite his manic mode of speech being difficult to understand, a waitress, Sylvia, learns that his name is David Helfgott and that he is staying at a local hotel. Sylvia returns him to the hotel, and despite his attempts to impress her with his musical knowledge and ownership of various musical scores, she leaves.

As a child, David is growing up in suburban Adelaide, South Australia, and competing in the musical competition of a local Eisteddfod. Helfgott has been taught to play by his father, Peter, who is obsessed with winning and has no tolerance for imperfection, dishonour and disobedience. While playing at the Eisteddfod, David is noticed by Mr. Rosen, a local piano teacher who, after initial resistance from Peter, takes over David's musical instruction.

As a teenager, David wins the state musical championship and is invited by concert violinist Isaac Stern to study in the United States. Plans are made to raise money to send David off to America. Initially, his family is supportive, but then Peter forbids David to leave, thinking his absence would destroy the family. Peter begins physically and mentally abusing David, which upsets the rest of the family.

Crushed, David continues to study and befriends local novelist and co-founder of the Communist Party of Australia, Katharine Susannah Prichard. David is eventually offered a scholarship to the Royal College of Music in London. This time, David is able to break away from Peter with the encouragement of Katharine. However, Peter issues an ultimatum, effectively banishing David and saying that David will never return home and never be anybody's son.

In London, David studies under Dr. Cecil Parkes and enters a music competition, choosing to play Sergei Rachmaninoff's demanding 3rd Piano Concerto, a piece he had attempted to learn as a young child to make his father proud. As David practices, he shows signs of mental stress. He wins the competition, but collapses from a mental breakdown and is admitted to a psychiatric hospital where he receives electroshock therapy. After recovering to the point he is able to return to Adelaide, David attempts to reconcile with Peter over the phone, only to be ignored by him due to the latter's belief that David had abandoned his family.

Years later, David, now living in a mental institution, is recognised by a volunteer who knows of his musical talent. The woman takes him home but discovers that he is difficult to control, unintentionally destructive, and needs more care than she can offer. As time passes, David has difficulty adjusting to life in broader society again, and often leaves the hotel to stimulate his interests.

The next day, David returns to the restaurant where the patrons are astounded by his skill at the piano. Sylvia, who had encountered David earlier, befriends and looks after him, and in return, David plays at the restaurant. Through Sylvia, David is introduced to an employee named Gillian. David and Gillian soon fall in love and marry. With Gillian's help and support, David is able to come to terms with his father's death and to stage a well-received comeback concert, presaging his return to professional music.

== Cast ==
- Geoffrey Rush as David Helfgott
  - Alex Rafalowicz as young David Helfgott
  - Noah Taylor as teenage David Helfgott
- Justin Braine as Tony
- Sonia Todd as Sylvia
- Chris Haywood as Sam
- Gordon Poole as Eisteddfod presenter
- Armin Mueller-Stahl as Peter Helfgott
- Nicholas Bell as Ben Rosen
- Danielle Cox as Suzie
- Rebecca Gooden as Margaret
- Marta Kaczmarek as Rachel
- John Cousins as Jim Minogue
- Randall Berger as Isaac Stern
- Googie Withers as Katharine Susannah Prichard
- John Gielgud as Cecil Parkes
- David King as Viney
- Robert Hands as Robert
- Marc Warren as Ray
- Neil Thomson as RCOM conductor
- Joey Kennedy as Suzie (adult)
- Beverley Dunn as Beryl Alcott
- Lynn Redgrave as Gillian
- Ella Scott Lynch as Jessica
- John Martin as Roger Woodward (older)
- Stephen Sheehan as Roger Woodward (younger)
- Edwin Hodgeman as Soviet Society Secretary
- Brenton Whittle as Announcer
- Louise Siversen as Extra in ballroom scene

== Production ==
Scott Hicks decided to make a film about David Helfgott after seeing him perform in Adelaide in 1985. It took a year for Hicks to persuade Helfgott and his wife Gillian, persevering "because he was so inspired by the pianist's story."

Hicks brought on friend and colleague John MacGregor to help with research and interviewing Helfgott's friends, family, and teachers. Hicks wrote a first-draft script titled Flight of the Bumblebee. In 1990, Hicks asked Jan Sardi to join the project as the screenwriter in order to get a fresh take on the material. Hicks explained: "I was very embedded in the biographical details and I wanted to lift the film out of simply being a biopic. Jan's enormous contribution was to lift the story into a wonderful place of storytelling which was very direct and very emotive. The screenplay became the calling-card both for cast, and ultimately money." During the scripting stage, Ronin Films signed on as the Australasian distributor for the film.

Hicks met with Geoffrey Rush in 1992, having been familiar with his work in Adelaide theatre. "He was mesmerising on stage and he had the physiognomy, and physiology and the hands to play David," said Hicks. However, Hicks faced resistance from investors in his decision to cast Rush, who was then a theatre actor with no major projects to his name. A crucial deal in the film getting made was Pandora Cinema's acquisition of the international and U.S. distribution rights. "The difference there was the person we were dealing with had seen Geoffrey Rush on stage in Sydney and so knew what I was talking about when I said this actor is extraordinary," Hicks said.

Geoffrey Rush resumed piano lessons—suspended when he was 14—in order not to require a hand double.

Hicks published a book in 2026 about the difficulties getting Shine made, Shine: Persistence of Vision.

== Release ==
Shine grossed $35,892,330 in the United States and Canada. The film also grossed $10,187,418 at the box office in Australia.

=== Home media ===
Roadshow Entertainment released the film on VHS on 4 July 1997, and on DVD on 18 November 1997. Umbrella Entertainment released the film on the 20th anniversary DVD on 5 May 2015.

== Reception ==
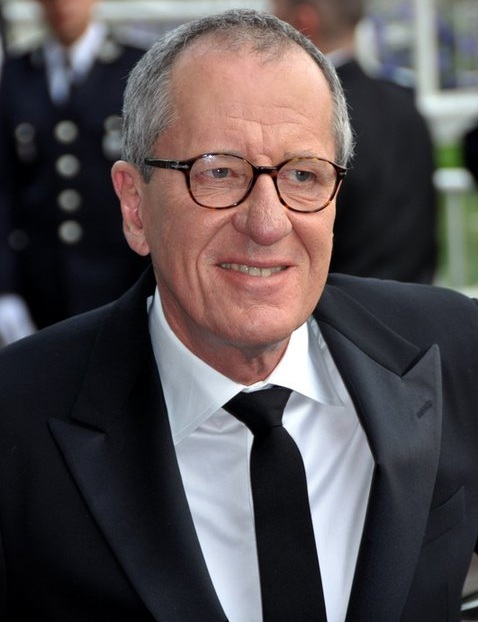
Geoffrey Rush's breakthrough performance as David Helfgott received widespread praise, which earned him the Academy Award for Best Actor.

Shine was met with acclaim from critics. On Rotten Tomatoes, it holds a 91% approval rating based on 44 reviews, with an average rating of 8/10. The critical consensus states, "featuring a strong performance from Geoffrey Rush, Shine succeeds in telling a compelling, inspirational story without resorting to cheap sentimentality". On Metacritic, the film holds an 87 rating out of a possible 100 from 27 critic reviews, indicating "universal acclaim". Critic Roger Ebert rated the film four out of four stars, stating "There has been much talk in 1996 about films whose filmmakers claim they were based on true stories but were kidding (Fargo), and films whose filmmakers claimed they were based on true stories but might have been lying (Sleepers). Here is a movie that is based on the truth beneath a true story."

=== Accolades ===
Award	Category	Nominee(s)	Result	Ref.
Academy Awards	Best Picture	Jane Scott	Nominated	
Academy Awards	Best Director	Scott Hicks	Nominated	
Academy Awards	Best Actor	Geoffrey Rush	Won	
Academy Awards	Best Supporting Actor	Armin Mueller-Stahl	Nominated	
Academy Awards	Best Screenplay – Written Directly for the Screen	Screenplay by Jan Sardi; Story by Scott Hicks	Nominated	
Academy Awards	Best Film Editing	Pip Karmel	Nominated	
Academy Awards	Best Original Dramatic Score	David Hirschfelder	Nominated	
American Cinema Editors Awards	Best Edited Feature Film	Pip Karmel	Nominated	
Art Film Festival Awards	Art Fiction: Best Director	Scott Hicks	Nominated	
Australian Film Institute Awards	Best Film	Jane Scott	Won	
Australian Film Institute Awards	Best Direction	Scott Hicks	Won	
Australian Film Institute Awards	Best Actor in a Leading Role	Geoffrey Rush	Won	
Australian Film Institute Awards	Best Actor in a Leading Role	Noah Taylor	Nominated	
Australian Film Institute Awards	Best Screenplay, Original	Jan Sardi	Won	
Australian Film Institute Awards	Best Achievement in Cinematography	Geoffrey Simpson	Won	
Australian Film Institute Awards	Best Achievement in Costume Design	Louise Wakefield	Nominated	
Australian Film Institute Awards	Best Achievement in Editing	Pip Karmel	Won	
Australian Film Institute Awards	Best Original Music Score	David Hirshfelder	Won	
Australian Film Institute Awards	Best Achievement in Production Design	Vicki Niehus	Nominated	
Australian Film Institute Awards	Best Achievement in Sound	Toivo Lember, Roger Savage, Livia Ruzic, and Gareth Vanderhope	Won	
Australian Performing Rights Association Awards	Best Film Score	David Hirschfelder	Won	
Australian Writers Guild Awards	Feature Film – Original	Jan Sardi	Won	
Boston Society of Film Critics Awards	Best Actor	Geoffrey Rush	Won	
British Academy Film Awards	Best Film	Jane Scott and Scott Hicks	Nominated	
British Academy Film Awards	Best Direction	Scott Hicks	Nominated	
British Academy Film Awards	Best Actor in a Leading Role	Geoffrey Rush	Won	
British Academy Film Awards	Best Actor in a Supporting Role	John Gielgud	Nominated	
British Academy Film Awards	Best Actress in a Supporting Role	Lynn Redgrave	Nominated	
British Academy Film Awards	Best Screenplay – Original	Jan Sardi	Nominated	
British Academy Film Awards	Best Editing	Pip Karmel	Nominated	
British Academy Film Awards	Best Original Music	David Hirschfelder	Nominated	
British Academy Film Awards	Best Sound	Jim Greenhorn, Toivo Lember, Livia Ruzic, Roger Savage, and Gareth Vanderhope	Won	
Camerimage Awards	Golden Frog	Geoffrey Simpson	Nominated	
Camerimage Awards	Bronze Frog	Geoffrey Simpson	Won	
Chicago Film Critics Association Awards	Best Actor	Geoffrey Rush	Nominated	
Chicago Film Critics Association Awards	Most Promising Actor	Geoffrey Rush	Nominated	
Chlotrudis Awards	Best Actor	Noah Taylor	Nominated	
Critics' Choice Awards	Best Picture		Nominated	
Critics' Choice Awards	Best Actor	Geoffrey Rush	Won	
Dallas–Fort Worth Film Critics Association Awards	Best Picture		Nominated	
Dallas–Fort Worth Film Critics Association Awards	Best Actor	Geoffrey Rush	Won	
Directors Guild of America Awards	Outstanding Directorial Achievement in Motion Pictures	Scott Hicks	Nominated	
Fantasporto Awards	Best Director	Scott Hicks	Won	
Film Critics Circle of Australia Awards	Best Film		Won	
Film Critics Circle of Australia Awards	Best Actor – Male	Geoffrey Rush	Won	
Film Critics Circle of Australia Awards	Best Supporting Actor – Male	Noah Taylor	Won	
Florida Film Critics Circle Awards	Best Actor	Geoffrey Rush	Won	
Ft. Lauderdale International Film Festival	Best Film (Jury Award)	Scott Hicks	Won	
Ft. Lauderdale International Film Festival	Best Actor (President Award)	Noah Taylor	Won	
Golden Globe Awards	Best Motion Picture – Drama		Nominated	
Golden Globe Awards	Best Actor in a Motion Picture – Drama	Geoffrey Rush	Won	
Golden Globe Awards	Best Director – Motion Picture	Scott Hicks	Nominated	
Golden Globe Awards	Best Screenplay – Motion Picture	Jan Sardi	Nominated	
Golden Globe Awards	Best Original Score – Motion Picture	David Hirschfelder	Nominated	
Hawaii International Film Festival	Best Narrative Feature	Scott Hicks	Won	
Humanitas Prize	Feature Film Category	Screenplay by Jan Sardi; Story by Scott Hicks	Nominated	
Japan Academy Film Prize	Outstanding Foreign Language Film		Nominated	
London Film Critics Circle Awards	Actor of the Year	Geoffrey Rush	Won	
Los Angeles Film Critics Association Awards	Best Actor	Geoffrey Rush	Won	
Los Angeles Film Critics Association Awards	Best Supporting Actor	Armin Mueller-Stahl	Runner-up	
National Board of Review Awards	Best film		Won	
National Board of Review Awards	Top Ten Films		Won	
National Society of Film Critics Awards	Best Actor	Geoffrey Rush	3rd Place	
New York Film Critics Circle Awards	Best Actor	Geoffrey Rush	Won	
Online Film & Television Association Awards	Best Picture	Jane Scott	Nominated	
Online Film & Television Association Awards	Best Drama Picture	Jane Scott	Nominated	
Online Film & Television Association Awards	Best Director	Scott Hicks	Nominated	
Online Film & Television Association Awards	Best Actor	Geoffrey Rush	Won	
Online Film & Television Association Awards	Best Drama Actor	Geoffrey Rush	Won	
Online Film & Television Association Awards	Best Screenplay – Written Directly for the Screen	Jan Sardi	Nominated	
Online Film & Television Association Awards	Best Score	David Hirschfelder	Nominated	
Producers Guild of America Awards	Outstanding Producer of Theatrical Motion Pictures	Jane Scott	Nominated	
Rotterdam International Film Festival Awards	Audience Award	Scott Hicks	Won	
San Diego Film Critics Society Awards	Best Supporting Actor	Armin Mueller-Stahl	Won	
Satellite Awards	Best Motion Picture – Drama		Nominated	
Satellite Awards	Best Director	Scott Hicks	Nominated	
Satellite Awards	Best Actor in a Motion Picture – Drama	Geoffrey Rush	Won (Note: Tied with James Woods for Killer: A Journal of Murder)	
Satellite Awards	Best Supporting Actor in a Motion Picture – Drama	Armin Mueller-Stahl	Won	
Satellite Awards	Best Screenplay – Original	Jan Sardi	Nominated	
Screen Actors Guild Awards	Outstanding Performance by a Cast in a Motion Picture	John Gielgud, Armin Mueller-Stahl, Lynn Redgrave, Geoffrey Rush, Noah Taylor, and Googie Withers	Nominated	
Screen Actors Guild Awards	Outstanding Performance by a Male Actor in a Leading Role	Geoffrey Rush	Won	
Screen Actors Guild Awards	Outstanding Performance by a Male Actor in a Supporting Role	Noah Taylor	Nominated	
Society of Texas Film Critics Awards	Best Actor	Geoffrey Rush	Won	
Southeastern Film Critics Association Awards	Best Picture		6th Place	
Southeastern Film Critics Association Awards	Best Actor	Geoffrey Rush	Runner-up	
St. Louis International Film Festival	Audience Choice Award	Scott Hicks	Won	
Toronto International Film Festival	People's Choice Award	Scott Hicks	Won	
Toronto International Film Festival	Metro Media Award	Scott Hicks	Won	
Turkish Film Critics Association Awards	Best Foreign Film		15th Place	
Writers Guild of America Awards	Best Screenplay – Written Directly for the Screen	Screenplay by Jan Sardi; Story by Scott Hicks	Nominated	
Yoga Awards	Worst Foreign Actor	Geoffrey Rush	Won	

== Soundtrack ==
1. "With a Girl Like You" (Reg Presley) – The Troggs
2. "Why Do They Doubt Our Love" written and performed by Johnny O'Keefe
3. Polonaise in A♭ major, Op. 53 (Frédéric Chopin) – Ricky Edwards
4. "Fast zu Ernst" – Scenes from Childhood, Op. 15 (Robert Schumann) – Wilhelm Kempff
5. La campanella (Franz Liszt) – David Helfgott
6. Hungarian Rhapsody No. 2 in C♯ minor (Liszt) – David Helfgott
7. "Flight of the Bumblebee" (Nikolai Rimsky-Korsakov) – David Helfgott
8. Gloria, RV 589 (Antonio Vivaldi)
9. "Un sospiro" (Liszt) – David Helfgott
10. "Nulla in mundo pax sincera" (Vivaldi) – Jane Edwards (soprano), Geoffrey Lancaster (harpsichord), Gerald Keuneman (cello)
11. "Daisy Bell" (Harry Dacre) – Ricky Edwards
12. "Funiculì, Funiculà" (Luigi Denza)
13. Piano Concerto No. 3 in D minor, Op. 30 (Sergei Rachmaninoff) – David Helfgott
14. Prelude in C♯ minor, Op. 3, No. 2 (Rachmaninoff) – David Helfgott
15. Symphony No. 9 in D minor, Op. 125 (Ludwig van Beethoven)
16. Sonata No. 23 in F minor, "Appassionata", Op. 57 (Beethoven) – Ricky Edwards
17. Prelude in D♭ major, "Raindrop", Op. 28, No. 15 (Chopin)

=== Charts ===
Chart (1996)	Peak position
Australian Albums (ARIA Charts)	14

=== Certifications ===
Region	Certification	Certified units/sales
Australia (ARIA)	Gold	35,000^{^}
^{^} Shipments figures based on certification alone.

== Historical accuracy ==
Some family members have stated that certain events and relationships in David Helfgott's life are portrayed inaccurately in the film. Helfgott's sister Margaret Helfgott, in her book Out of Tune, states that Helfgott's father Peter Helfgott was a loving husband, over-lenient parent and not the abusive tyrant portrayed in Shine. She states that Peter Helfgott's decision to prevent David from going overseas at the age of 14 was a reasonable judgment that he was not ready for such independence.

Margaret and Les Helfgott (David's brother) have stated that "there was no estrangement from members of David's family following his return to Australia. On the contrary, he moved straight back into the family home, and was cared for by our family. Dad was not 'overbearing', and his main objection to David's going abroad was his concern for his son's welfare."

Les Helfgott has described the portrayal of their father both in Shine and in Gillian Helfgott's biography as "all outright lies". David Helfgott's first wife Clare Papp has also said that Peter Helfgott was "quite badly maligned" in the film. Helfgott's mother said the film haunted her and that she felt "an evil had been done".

Scott Hicks has defended the authenticity of the movie's portrayal of Helfgott's childhood and suggested that David's other siblings, Susie and Les, were at odds with Margaret's claims and were happy with the movie. John Macgregor—who was involved in the research and wrote an early treatment for Shine—claimed that the portrayal of the Helfgotts' father was supported not only by David but (with the exception of Margaret) by every family member and family friend he and Scott Hicks interviewed, as well as by every interviewee who had a professional or musical connection with David throughout his early life.

=== Pianistic ability ===
The New Zealand philosopher Denis Dutton claimed that the film grossly exaggerates Helfgott's pianistic ability, drawing public attention away from pianists who are more talented and disciplined.

== See also ==
- Cinema of Australia
- Trauma model of mental disorders
- South Australian Film Corporation
