= Mao's Last Dancer (film) =

- Theatrical film poster
- Directed by: Bruce Beresford
- Screenplay by: Jan Sardi
- Based on: Mao's Last Dancer by Li Cunxin
- Produced by: Jane Scott
- Starring: Bruce Greenwood; Kyle MacLachlan; Joan Chen; Amanda Schull; Chi Cao
- Cinematography: Peter James
- Edited by: Mark Warner
- Music by: Christopher Gordon
- Production company: Great Scott Productions Pty. Ltd.
- Distributed by: Roadshow Films (Australia); Samuel Goldwyn Films (United States)
- Release date: 13 September 2009 (TIFF)
- Running time: 117 minutes
- Countries: Australia; United States
- Languages: English; Mandarin Chinese
- Budget: A$25 million
- Box office: US$22.3 million

Mao's Last Dancer is a 2009 Australian film based on professional dancer Li Cunxin's 2003 autobiographical memoir of the same name. Li Cunxin is portrayed by Birmingham Royal Ballet Principal Dancer Chi Cao, Australian Ballet dancer Chengwu Guo and Huang Wen Bin. The film also stars Bruce Greenwood, Kyle MacLachlan, Joan Chen and Amanda Schull.

The film premiered on 13 September 2009, at the Toronto International Film Festival. General release in Australia and New Zealand began on 1 October 2009. It began screening in the United States on 33 screens in August 2010.

== Plot ==
During Mao's Cultural Revolution, 11-year-old Chinese boy Li Cunxin resides in a rural village commune in Shandong Province, destined to labour in the fields. As often occurred in those times, government officials fanning out across the nation seeking young candidates for centralized training arrive at his school. At first bypassed but selected after a plea by his teacher during the school visit, Li seems bewildered although piqued by the gruff preliminary inspection screening at the provincial capital city of Qingdao. Forwarded to a Beijing audition for a place in Madame Mao's Dance Academy, he is admitted for ballet training based on a series of physique and flexibility examinations.

Years of arduous training follow, Li surpassing his initial lukewarm interest and mediocre performance after inspiration from senior teacher Chan (whose advocacy of classical Russian ballet as opposed to the politically aimed, physically strident form required by Madame Mao leads to the teacher's apparent banishment). Later during the course of a groundbreaking cultural visit to China, American-based English ballet director Ben Stevenson, impressed by Li's standout talent, seeks him as an exchange student at the Houston Ballet. Li's determined courage garners a formerly disparaging teacher to influence the Academy to allow him the opportunity for a three-month stay in the United States.

Li's encounters with US life cause questioning of the Chinese Communist Party dictates upon which he has been raised, and he begins a relationship with an aspiring American dancer, Elizabeth Mackey. Quickly attracting the attention of the local ballet scene, Li together with Stevenson requests a time extension in America, but the Chinese government refuses. Overwhelmed by the opportunities offered in America and in love with Mackey, Li is determined to stay. With legal advice that the Chinese government would recognize certain residence rights arising from an international marriage, Li and Mackey rush into a marriage. To declare personal responsibility for his decision and hopefully avoid consequences for his family and Stevenson, Li visits the Chinese Consulate in Houston. The Chinese resident diplomat forcibly detains Li in an attempt to coerce his return to China. Unknown to Li, the situation quickly evolves when the media and high level government agents both in the US and China become involved. When Li perseveres in his refusal to repatriate, the Chinese Government agrees to release him but revokes his citizenship and declares he can never return to the land of his birth.

Li and Elizabeth are set to depart for Florida but Li is persuaded to stay by Stevenson for his ballet company, dooming Elizabeth's prospects of dancing success. Burdened by this, plus concerned for and unable to communicate with his family, Cunxin continues to excel as a dancer, but his relationship with Elizabeth disintegrates and their marriage ends. Five years later, as a show of goodwill the Chinese government allows Li's parents to visit him in the US where they finally witness his performance of The Rite of Spring and even reunite with him on stage. Li is eventually granted permission to visit China. Together with his new wife Mary McKendry, an Australian ballerina, and coming back to the village of his youth, he rejoins his family and his former teacher Chan, who expresses regret that he never got to see Li perform. Li and McKendry give an impromptu outdoor ballet performance to the village's uproarious cheer.

Closing credits announce that Li Cunxin danced in China with the Houston Ballet in 1995 in a performance broadcast to an audience of over 500 million people. He and Mary McKendry now live in Australia with their three children. Ben Stevenson left the Houston Ballet after 27 years as Artistic Director. Acclaimed as one of the world's leading choreographers, he is now Artistic Director of the Texas Ballet Theater. Charles C. Foster still practices law in Houston and is recognized internationally as an authority on Immigration Law. Elizabeth Mackey danced with the Oklahoma Ballet for some years and is now a speech therapist working mainly with children.

== Cast ==
- Chi Cao as Li Cunxin
  - Chengwu Guo as teenage Li Cunxin
  - Huang Wen Bin as child Li Cunxin
- Joan Chen as Li Cunxin's mother
- Wang Shuang Bao as Li Cunxin's father
- Bruce Greenwood as Ben Stevenson
- Kyle MacLachlan as Charles Foster
- Penne Hackforth-Jones as Cynthia Dodds
- Amanda Schull as Elizabeth "Liz" Mackey
- Jack Thompson as Judge Woodrow Seals
- Camilla Vergotis as Mary McKendry
- Aden Young as Dilworth

== Music ==
The soundtrack score was composed by Australian composer Christopher Gordon. The score utilises a standard Western orchestra, with the addition of a number of Chinese instruments. The score won the Best Original Music Score prize at the 2009 AFI Awards (now AACTA) as well as Best Feature Score and Best Soundtrack Album at the Screen Music Awards Australia, Federation Square in Melbourne. An ensemble led by composer and pianist Paul Grabowsky performed excerpts from the nominated scores including Pas de Deux and Madame's Model Ballet from Mao's Last Dancer. The night closed with a performance of Out of the Well and Free Dance conducted by the composer.

== Reception ==
The film received mixed reviews, with a score of 55% on Rotten Tomatoes based on 76 reviews. Metacritic, which uses a weighted average, assigned the film a score of 55 out of 100, based on 23 critics, indicating "mixed or average" reviews.

The film was the 15th highest-grossing film in Australia in 2009 and was the 12th highest grossing Australian film of all time as of 2010.

=== Accolades ===
Award	Category	Subject	Result
AACTA Awards (2009 AFI Awards)	Best Film	Jane Scott	Nominated
AACTA Awards (2009 AFI Awards)	Best Direction	Bruce Beresford	Nominated
AACTA Awards (2009 AFI Awards)	Best Adapted Screenplay	Jan Sardi	Nominated
AACTA Awards (2009 AFI Awards)	Best Editing	Mark Warner	Nominated
AACTA Awards (2009 AFI Awards)	Best Original Music Score	Christopher Gordon	Won
AACTA Awards (2009 AFI Awards)	Best Sound	Yulia Akerholt	Nominated
AACTA Awards (2009 AFI Awards)	Best Sound	Mark Franken	Nominated
AACTA Awards (2009 AFI Awards)	Best Sound	David Lee	Nominated
AACTA Awards (2009 AFI Awards)	Best Sound	Andrew Neil	Nominated
AACTA Awards (2009 AFI Awards)	Best Sound	Roger Savage	Nominated
AACTA Awards (2009 AFI Awards)	Best Production Design	Herbert Pinter	Nominated
AACTA Awards (2009 AFI Awards)	Best Costume Design	Anna Borghesi	Nominated
FCCA Awards	Best Film	Jane Scott	Nominated
FCCA Awards	Best Director	Bruce Beresford	Nominated
FCCA Awards	Best Editing	Mark Warner	Nominated
FCCA Awards	Best Music Score	Christopher Gordon	Nominated
Inside Film Awards	Best Feature Film	Jane Scott	Nominated
Inside Film Awards	Best Direction	Bruce Beresford	Nominated
Inside Film Awards	Best Script	Jan Sardi	Nominated
Inside Film Awards	Best Actor	Chi Cao	Nominated
Inside Film Awards	Best Actress	Joan Chen	Nominated
Inside Film Awards	Best Cinematography	Peter James	Nominated
Inside Film Awards	Best Music	Christopher Gordon	Nominated
Movieguide Awards	Faith & Freedom Award for Movies	Mao's Last Dancer	Nominated

== Box office ==
Mao's Last Dancer grossed $15,440,315 at the box office in Australia.
