= Love's Brother =

- Directed by: Jan Sardi
- Written by: Jan Sardi
- Starring: Giovanni Ribisi; Adam Garcia; Joe Petruzzi; Amelia Warner
- Release date: 2004
- Running time: Palace Films
- Country: Australia
- Language: English

Love's Brother is a 2004 film written and directed by Jan Sardi.

== Plot ==
Angelo Donnini and his younger brother Gino are of Italian origin, living in Australia in the 1950s. Angelo is insecure, silent and introverted and not at all good-looking, while Gino is the complete opposite: outgoing, funny and handsome. Angelo looks for a wife and writes letters to Italian girls in hope of a match. But his letters are always returned with his photograph. One day, he desperately sends a new letter with a picture of his brother to Rosetta, who falls in love instantly with the man in the picture and therefore accepts his marriage proposal. When she arrives in Australia she is, of course, appalled that Angelo does not look like the man she thought she had married. However, she stays, to try to gain Gino's affections. But Gino has a girlfriend, Connie, a wise and tough girl who knows exactly what she wants. She loves Gino but wishes he possed more of Angelo's qualities. Though Gino tries to avoid Rosetta, he cannot help but eventually fall in love with her. Gino and Connie have an argument and they call it quits, and Angelo and Connie start to develop a romance. In the end, Rosetta, believing that she has failed to gain Gino's affections, decides to return to Italy with the help of Father Alfredo. Gino follows her onto the ship and they embrace. The couple then marry. In the final scene of the film, which seems to be a few years later, it shows the wedding party of Connie and Angelo, while Gino is married to Rosetta and they have a newborn baby.

== Cast ==
- Giovanni Ribisi as Angelo Donnini
- Adam Garcia as Gino Donnini
- Joe Petruzzi as Zio Luigi
- Amelia Warner as Rosetta
- Silvia De Santis as Connie
- Barry Otto as Father Alfredo
- Bruno Lucia as Paolo

== Locations ==
Love's Brother was filmed on location at Daylesford and Hepburn Springs, Glenlyon, Smeaton and Talbot, Victoria, Australia, and on location at Civita di Bagnoregio, Italy.

The storyline had some similarities with They Knew What They Wanted.

== Budget ==
The budget for the film was reported to be approximately $10million. This figure would have included the additional costs necessary for official co-productions.

== Box office ==
Love's Brother grossed $977,106 at the box office in Australia.

== See also ==
- Cinema of Australia
