= Purple Bamboo Park =

Urban park in Beijing, China

Coordinates: 39.941366°N 116.313145°E

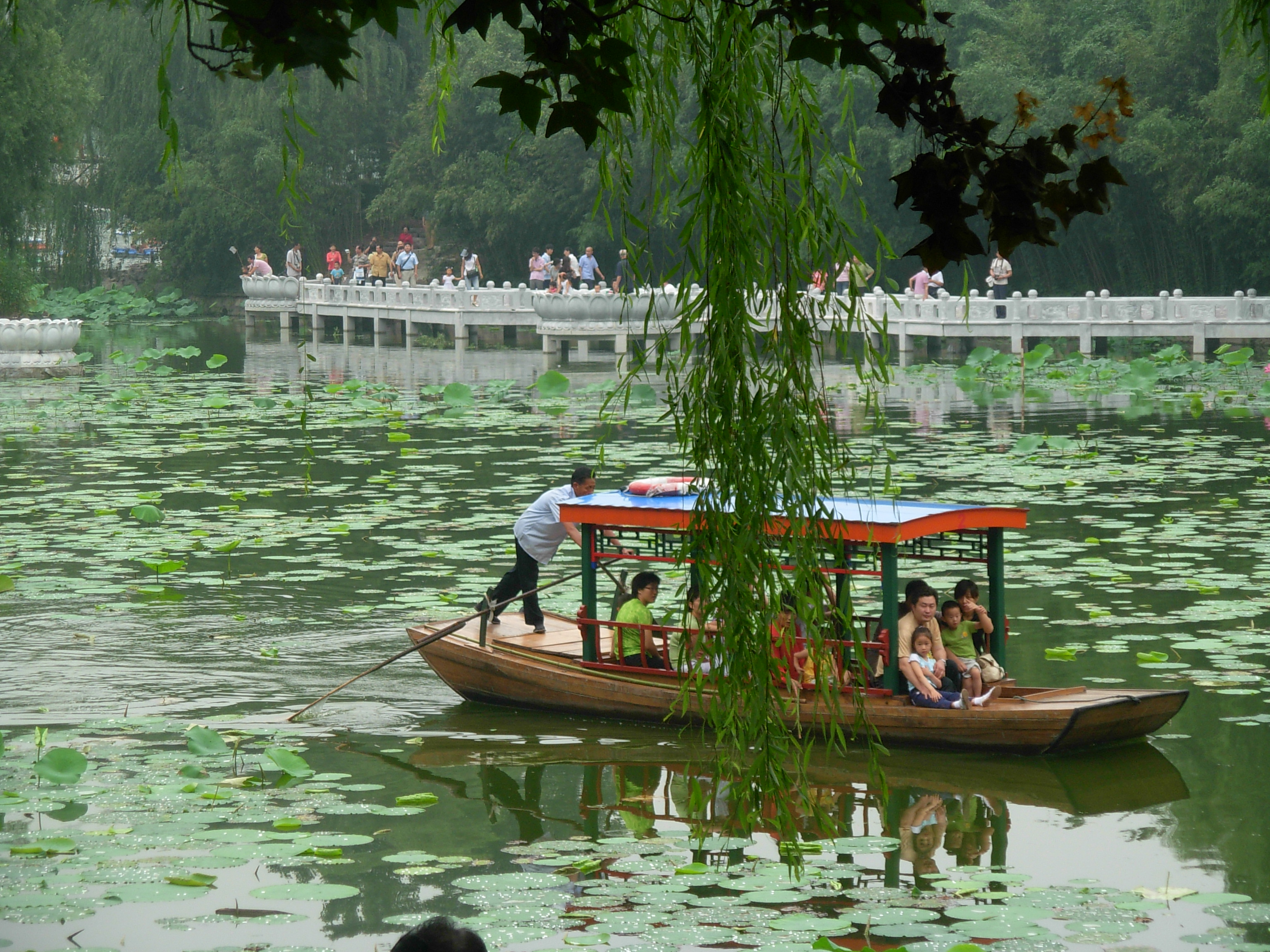
- Interactive map of Purple Bamboo Park
- Type: Urban park
- Location: Beijing, China
- Area: 47.35 hectares (117.0 acres)
- Created: 1159 (Lake); 1577 (Original); 1954 (Current Park)
- Owner: Beijing Municipal Administration Center of Parks
- Status: Open all year

Purple Bamboo Park (Chinese: 紫竹院公园; pinyin: Zǐzhúyuàn Gōngyuán; also called Zizhuyuan Park or Black Bamboo Park) is one of the seven largest parks in Beijing, China. It is located in the Haidian District of northwestern Beijing.

The park consists of three connecting lakes covering over a total area of 48 hectares. The lakes' eastern shores consist of several small hills, and they were formed with the earth dredged from the lakes, to balance the natural hills on the western shores of the lakes. There are five bridges connecting the lakes, islands and hills into a single integrated area. To the north of the lakes the Changhe River flows through.

Typical of classical Chinese garden style, and like many of Beijing's parks and gardens, it is a mountain-water landscaped garden. Constructed around canals and large lakes, the Bamboo Park is known for its liberal use of verdant bamboo groves. The garden has a variety of bamboos on display, with the variety ranging as much as up to 50 species. There is also an art museum located within the park.

The three major lakes in the park were formed in 1159. During the Ming Dynasty, the Wanli Emperor built a royal garden on the bank of the lake in 1577, and the bamboo was planted following that. In 1954, the park was rebuilt and open to public.

During the 2008 Summer Olympics, it was selected as one of the three protest zones.

== Gallery ==
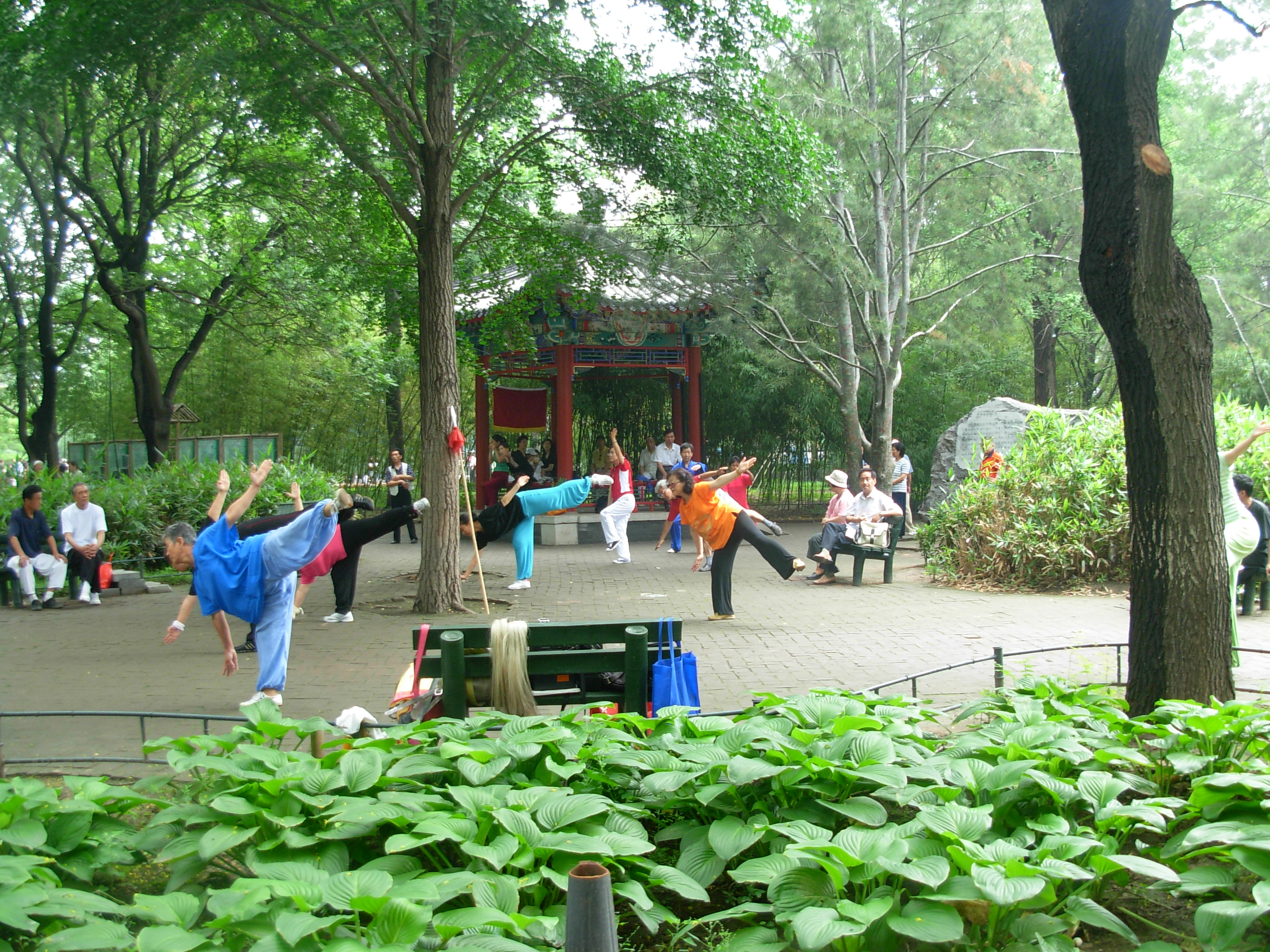
As with many of Beijing's parks, it is also a place for people to exercise

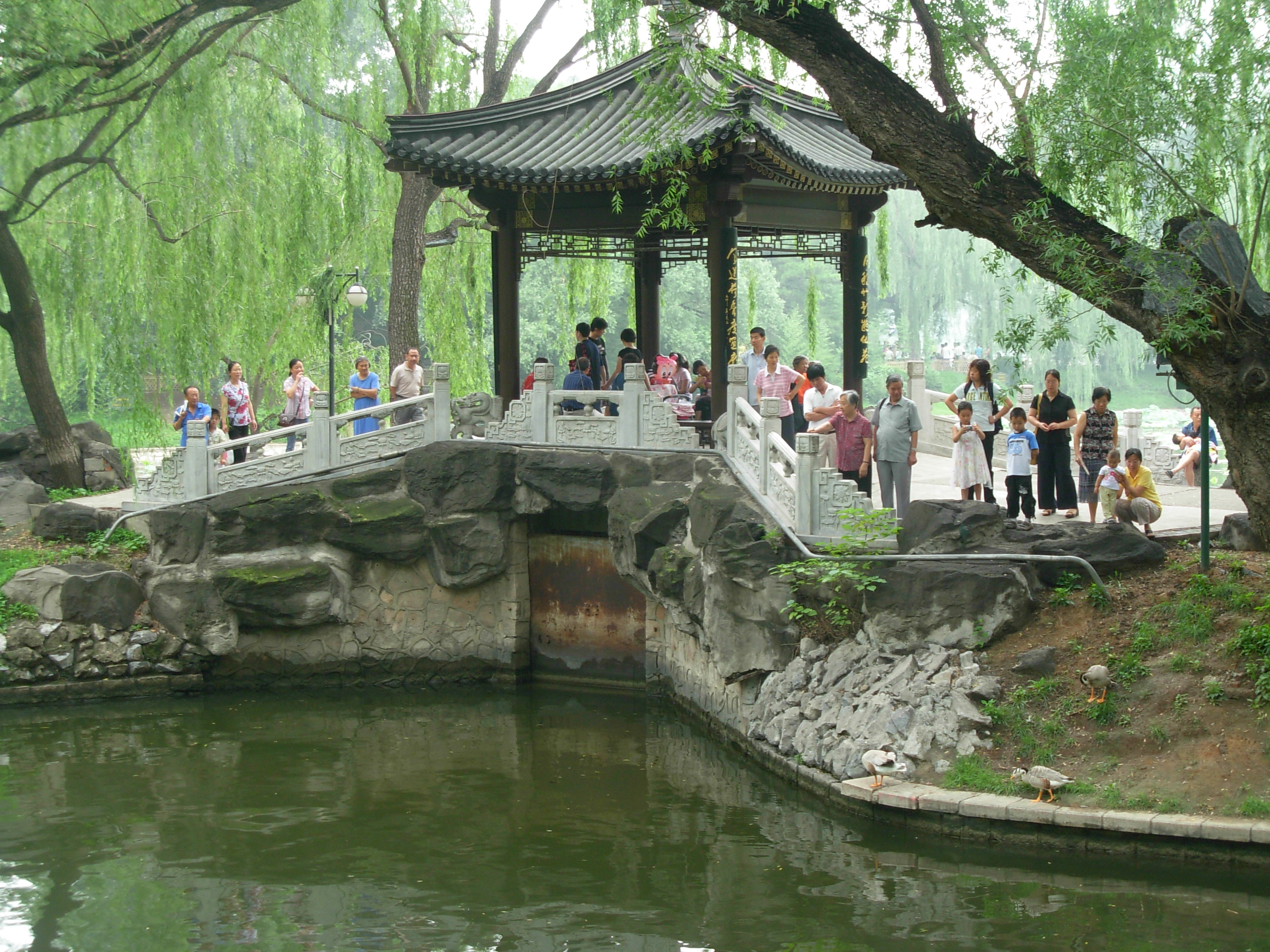

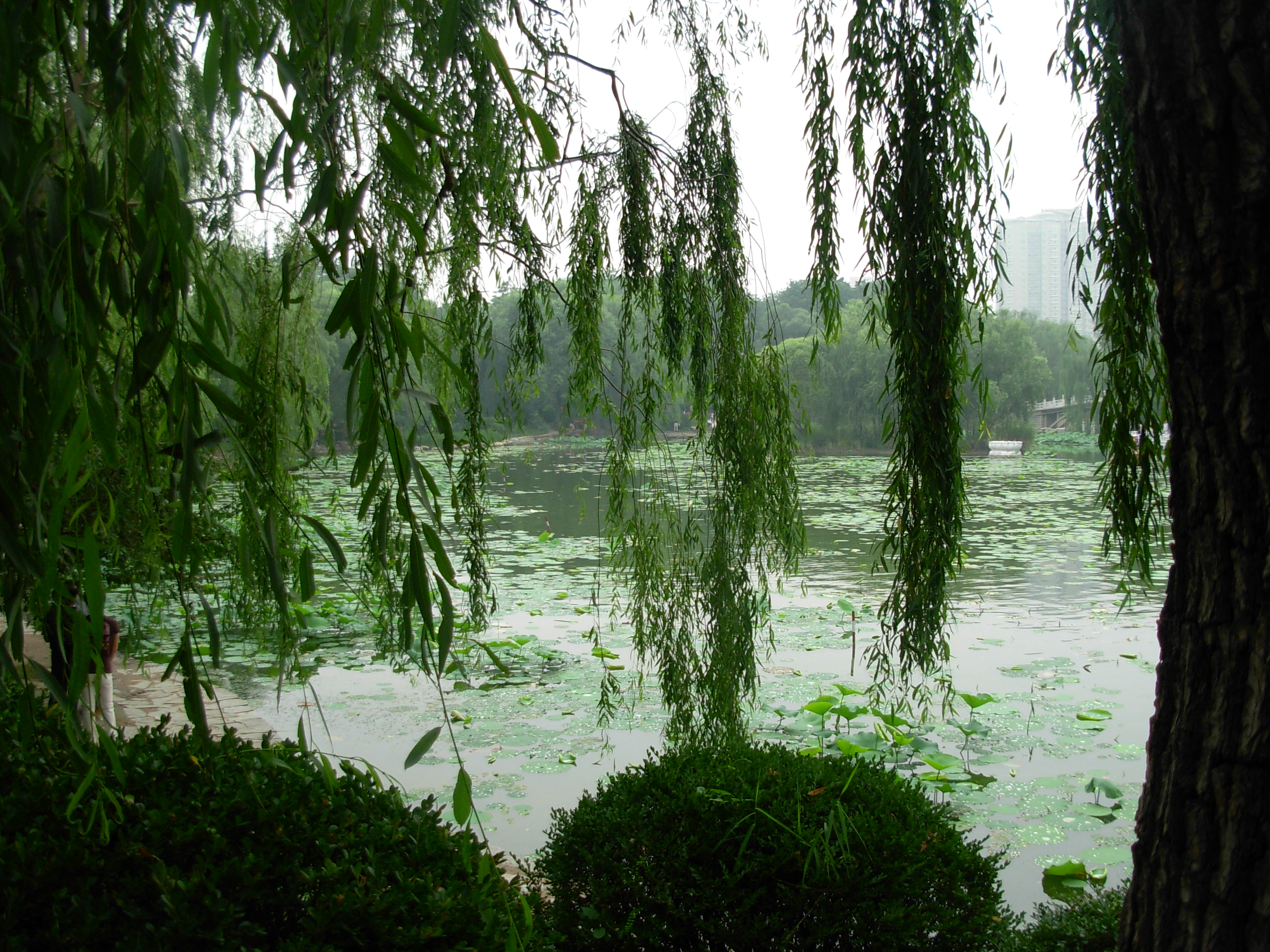

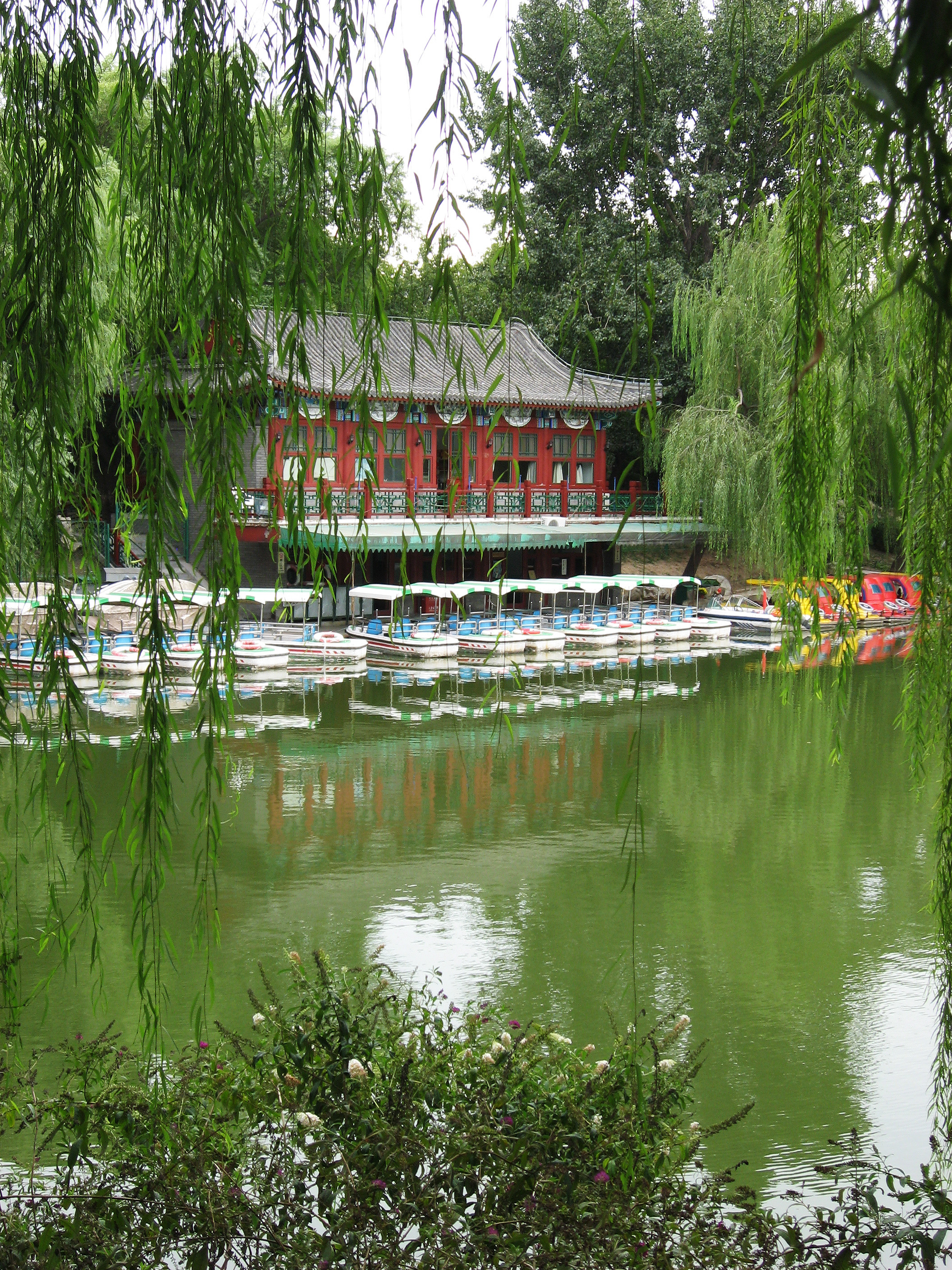

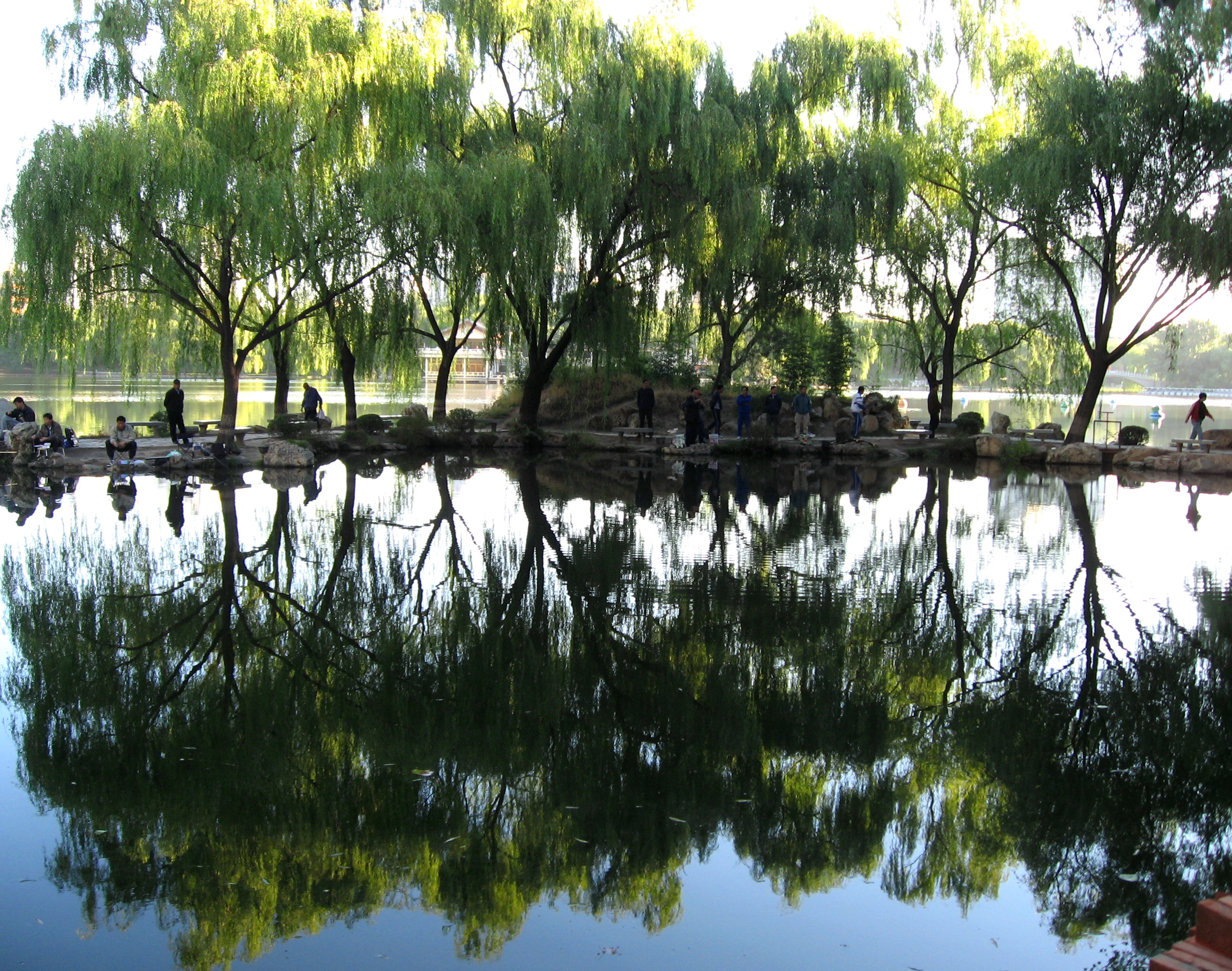

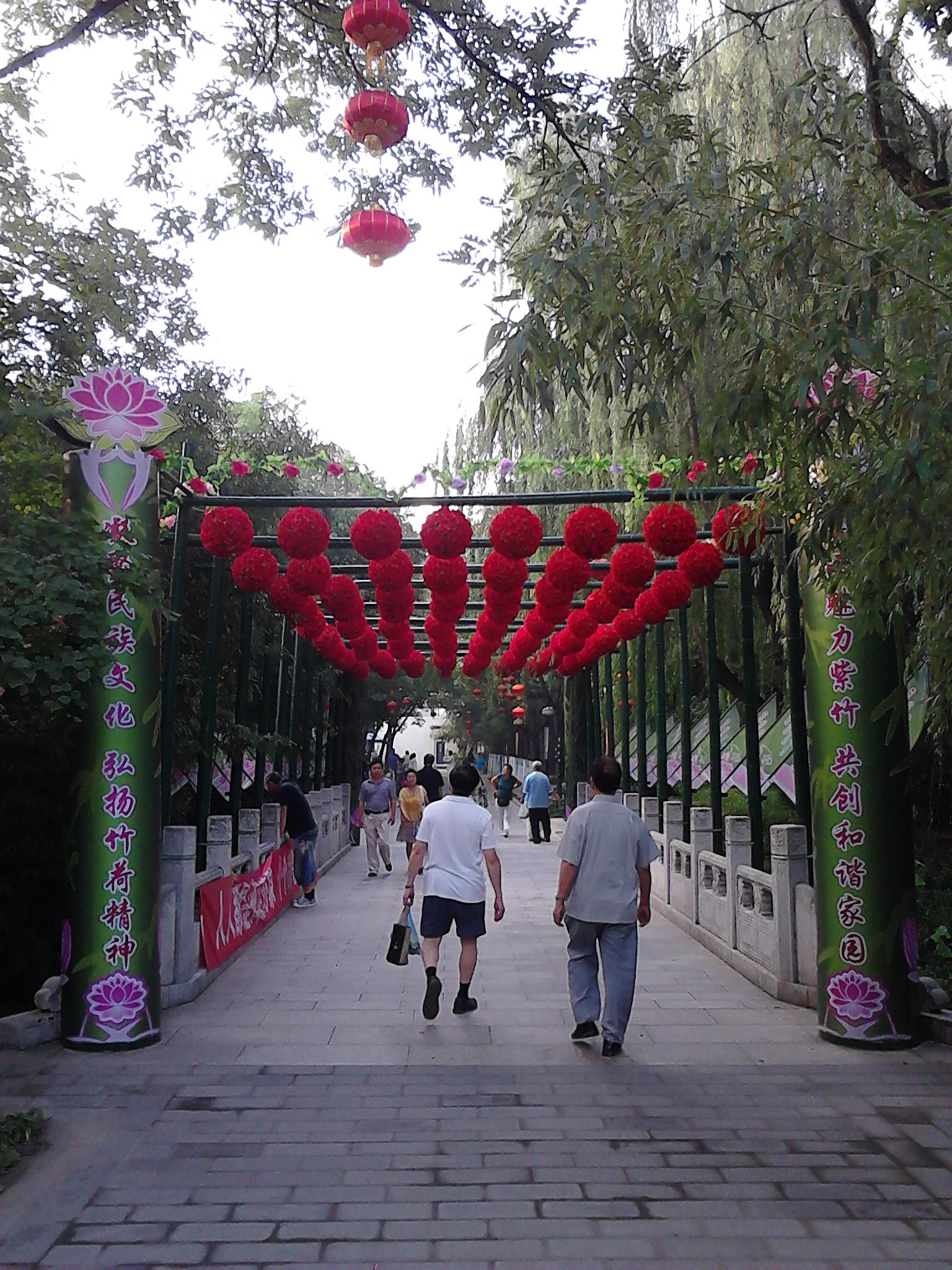

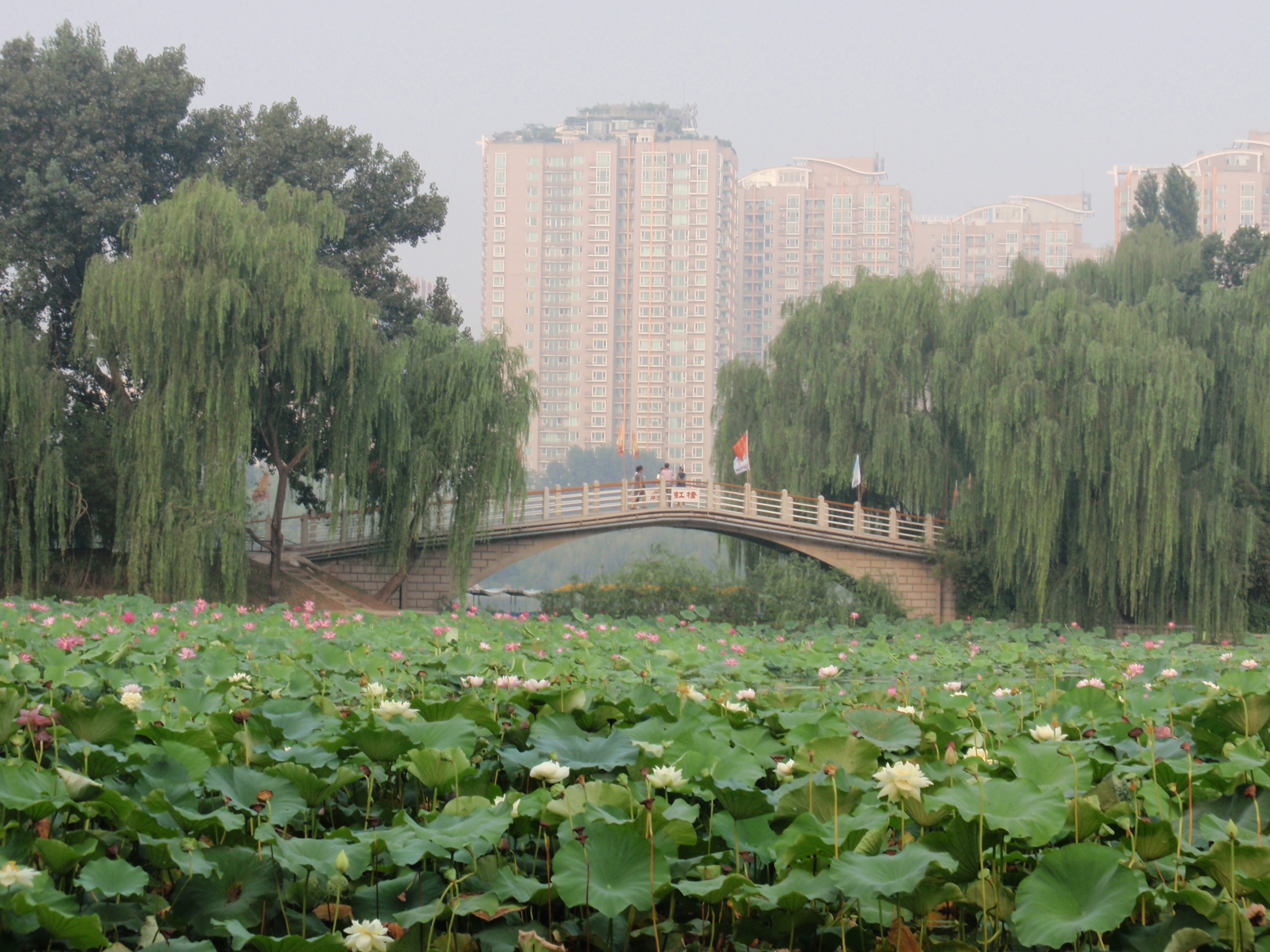
