= Wen Hui (dancer) =

Chinese dancer and choreographer (born 1960)

- 文慧
- Born: 1960 (age 65–66); Shuangbai County, Yunnan, Southwest China
- Education: Beijing Dance Academy; Folkwang University of the Arts
- Awards: Goethe Medal

Wen Hui (Chinese: 文慧; pinyin: Wén Huì, born 1960) is a Chinese dancer, choreographer, and filmmaker. She co-founded the Living Dance Studio in Beijing, China’s first independent dance theatre company.

== Biography ==
Wen Hui was born in 1960 in Dahebian, a village in Yunnan, Southwest China. After middle school, she attended Yunnan Arts University between 1974 and 1980 with her brother.

During the Cultural Revolution in the 1960s and 1970s, Wen studied Chinese folk dance and dances for the revolutionary operas, known as yangbanxi (Chinese: 样板戏). Wen studied at the Department of Choreography of the Beijing Dance Academy from 1985 to 1989.After graduating, Wen was appointed as a choreographer at the Oriental Song and Dance Ensemble of China (Chinese: 中国东方演艺集团, romanized: Dongfang gewutuan). When she produced a jazz dance for the Dong-fang Ensemble, her work was immediately taken off the programme.

In 1997, Wen studied modern dance in New York with funding from the Asian Cultural Council. She also spent time in Europe, studying at Folkwang University and joining Tanztheater Wuppertal Pina Bausch. In 1994, after Wen returned to China, she and Chinese filmmaker Wu Wenguang, her partner at the time, co-founded the Living Dance Studio (LDS) in Beijing, which was China’s first independent dance theatre company. The studios first production was called 100 Verbs. Wen and Wu also co-curated the first “Crossing” International Dance Festival in Beijing and established The European Artists Exchange Project and Young Choreographers Project in 2005.

From 1999 to 2000, Wen performed with American contemporary choreographer Ralph Lemon’s dance company in the United States. In 1999, she produced Report on Giving Birth, based on interviews conducted with women about their experience of childbirth. The work was revived 25 years after the initial production at the Théâtre de la Ville in Paris.

In 2001, Wen premiered Dance with Farm Workers (Chinese: 民工跳舞, romanized: He míngōng tiàowǔ) at the East Modern Art Centre, featuring both professional dancers and migrant workers in the piece. The show has also been performed in the Chinese Pavilion at the Venice Biennale in Venice.

In 2004, Wen's piece Report on Body won the ZKB Patronage Prize of the Zürcher Theater Spektakel in Zurich.

From 2008, Wen's Living Dance Studio productions focused on topics of history and bodily memory. In 2015, Wen curated the ReActor Project at the Museum of Contemporary Art Shanghai. Her 2018 production Red was inspired by the Cultural Revolution era Red Detachment of Women (ballet).

In 2011, Wen Hui conducted interviews in her home village for The Memory Project Oral History, with Wu Wenguang's Caochangdi Workstation.

Wen was awarded the German Goethe Medal in 2021. That year she presented the solo work I am 60 at the Festival d’Automne in Paris, and at the Ruhrtriennale in the Ruhr, Germany. Although usually based in Beijing, Wen remained in Germany as of 2024 due to the COVID-19 lockdowns, residing in Munich and later Frankfurt.

In 2024, Wen performed in What Is War with Eiko Otake, which explored memories of China and Japan in World War II.
