= Jan Sardi =

Australian screenwriter (born 1953)

Jan Vittorio Sardi AO (born 1953) is an Australian screenwriter. He is known for his screenplay for the 1996 film Shine and Mao's Last Dancer (2009).

== Early life ==
Jan Vittorio Sardi was born in 1953 on the island of Elba, Tuscany, Italy. His family migrated to Australia.

== Career ==
Sardi wrote and directed the 2004 film Love's Brother. He adapted the novel by Nicholas Sparks for The Notebook (2004).

Sardi also adapted Li Cunxin's memoir for the film Mao's Last Dancer (2009) and co-wrote the screenplay for the 2015 miniseries The Secret River, based on the novel by Kate Grenville.

== Other activities and roles ==
Sardi has served on the board of Film Victoria (now VicScreen), 1987-1989 and 2007-2015, and was president of the Australian Writers' Guild (AWG) from 2011 to 2015. He was also on the National Executive Council of AWG 1988-1991, 1999-2002, and again from 2010 (until at least 2020), and was a member of the Victorian Committee of the AWG in the 1980s-1990s. He was chair of the Authorship Collecting Society in 2020 and a member of Scripted Ink.

He is a member of the Academy of Motion Picture Arts and Sciences, and the British Academy of Film and Television Arts.

== Recognition and awards ==
In 1997, Sardi was nominated for an Academy Award for Best Writing (Original Screenplay), for Shine.

Film Victoria established an annual award named the Jan Sardi Award, for achievement in screenwriting, in 2016.

In 2020 he was made an Officer of the Order of Australia, "for distinguished services to the film and television industries as a screenwriter and director".

Other recognition and awards include:

For Shine (1996-7):

- Winner, Best Original Screenplay, Australian Writers' Guild, 1996
- Winner, Best Original Screenplay, Australian Film Institute, 1996
- Nominee, Academy Award, Best Original Screenplay, 1997
- Nominee, BAFTA Award, Best Original Screenplay, Shine, 1997
- Nominee, Golden Globe Award, Best Original Screenplay, 1997

For Love's Brother (2004):

- Best Film, Houston International Film Festival
- Best Director, Houston International Film Festival
- Best Film, Grand Prize Winner, Heartland Film Festival, US

For other films and TV series:

- 2010: Audience Award, Mao's Last Dancer, Australian Film Institute
- 2015: AWGIE Award for Best Screenplay, Miniseries, The Secret River, Australian Writers' Guild
- 2016: Logie Award, Best Telemovie or Miniseries, The Secret River

== Selected filmography ==
- Moving Out (1983)
- Street Hero (1984)
- Ground Zero, (1987)
- Breakaway (1990)
- Mission: Impossible (1990) (S2E30: “Deadly Harvest")
- Halifax f.p. (1995) (S1E3: “Lies of the Mind")
- Shine (1996)
- Love's Brother (2004) (also director)
- The Notebook (2004) (adapted novel)
- Mao's Last Dancer (2009) (adapted memoir)
- The Secret River (2015, miniseries) (co-written with Mac Gudgeon)
