= Li Cunxin =

Chinese-Australian ballet dancer and director (born 1961)

Li Cunxin AO
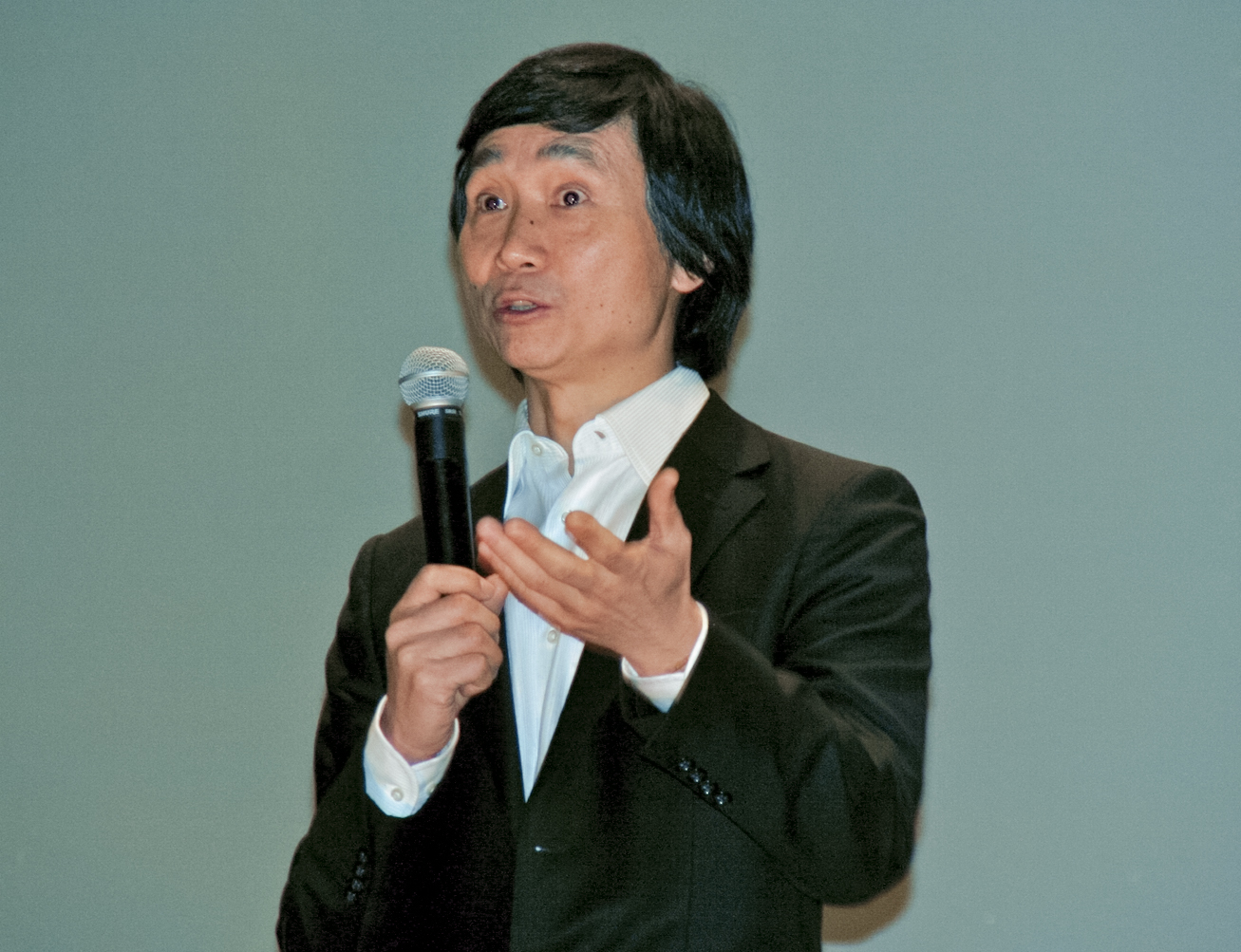
- Li Cunxin in 2010
- Born: 26 January 1961 (age 65); Qingdao, Shandong, China
- Spouses: Elizabeth Mackey (m. 1981; div. 1987) Mary McKendry (m. 1987)
- Children: 3

Li Cunxin
- Chinese: 李存信
Transcriptions
Standard Mandarin
- Hanyu Pinyin: Lǐ Cúnxìn
- IPA: [lì tsʰwə̌n.ɕîn]

Li Cunxin AO (born 26 January 1961) is a Chinese-Australian former ballet dancer turned stockbroker. He was the artistic director of the Queensland Ballet between 2012 and 2023.

== Early life ==
Li was the sixth of seven brothers, born into poverty in the Li Commune near the city of Qingdao in the Shandong province of the People's Republic of China. He often had to support his extremely poor family. Li's early life coincided with Mao Zedong's rule over the new Communist nation. Li had a strong desire to serve China's Communist Party. He was quite politically devout, eventually joining in the CCP's Youth League. At the age of eleven, he was chosen by Madame Mao's cultural advisors to attend the Beijing Dance Academy, where students had to undergo 16-hour-a-day training. He attended the academy for seven years. The regime in Beijing Dance was harsh, starting each morning at 5:30. Li performed well in political studies, but did poorly in ballet. This changed when he met Teacher Xiao, who had a passion for ballet. Xiao's passion influenced Li, and by the end of the seven years of training, he graduated at the top of his class.

== Career ==
Artistic Director of the Houston Ballet Ben Stevenson was teaching two semesters at the Beijing Dance Academy. He offered a full scholarship for two dancers to study at the Houston Ballet summer school and Li was chosen as one. (Li was one of the first students from the Beijing Dance Academy to go to the United States under financial support from the central government of the People's Republic of China.)

=== United States ===
After his study at the summer school, Li defected to the West. He was held in the Chinese Consulate in Houston, his defection creating headlines in America. He had begun a relationship with an aspiring American dancer, Elizabeth Mackey, and in 1981, they married so that Li could avoid deportation. After 21 hours of negotiations, and intervention by then Vice President George H. W. Bush, Li was allowed to stay in the US as a free man, but his Chinese citizenship was revoked.

=== Australia ===
Li subsequently danced with the Houston Ballet for sixteen years, during which he won two silver and a bronze medal at International Ballet Competitions. While dancing in London, he met ballerina Mary McKendry from Rockhampton, Australia. They married in 1987. In 1995 they moved to Melbourne, Australia, with their two children. Li became a principal dancer with the Australian Ballet.

In July 2012, Li was named artistic director of the Queensland Ballet. Li established himself as a mainstay of Brisbane's cultural scene.

On 20 June 2023, Li announced that he and his wife Mary would retire at the end of 2023, her being in the teaching position as principal repetiteur with the ballet company. Li cited a heart condition, and Mary has been undergoing treatment for cancer. Li is now retired and living in Brisbane.

== Honours ==
He was named Australian Father of the Year in 2009.

In July 2016, Barbara Baehr and Robert Whyte from the Queensland Museum named a newly discovered spider species Maratus licunxini after Li Cunxin. Dr Baehr said a Queensland Ballet performance of Li's A Midsummer Night's Dream reminded her of the stunning mating display of the peacock spider. Li said he was honoured to have the spider named after him saying "having seen this incredible spider, the intricate mating dance, the fancy peacock markings, I can understand why Barbara would make a link with our ballet dancers."

In 2017, after 18 years off-stage, Li returned for a one-off performance as Drosselmeyer, specially choreographed by Ben Stevenson, in The Nutcracker for the Queensland Ballet, dancing again with his wife, Mary McKendry, with whom he last danced in this work 26 years ago in Houston.

In the 2019 Birthday Honours, Li was appointed officer (AO) of the Order of Australia for "distinguished service to the performing arts, particularly to ballet, as a dancer and artistic director".

On 11 December 2023, at the graduation ceremony of the University of Queensland, Li was honoured with the degree of Honorary Doctor of Letters, and gave the graduation speech.

== Stockbroking ==
After arriving in Australia in 1995, when sidelined by a sprained ankle, Li occupied himself by gaining work experience with ANZ Securities and embarking on a three-year diploma course with the Australian Securities Institute. He had previously become interested in the stock market while in Houston. The Australian Ballet and ANZ Securities accommodated his desire to work at two professions simultaneously, dancing and stockbroking. On Mondays, Wednesdays and Fridays he worked at the stockbroking firm from 7:30am till noon when he arrived at the Australian Ballet for rehearsals and to prepare for performances. He followed this routine for two years. He believed these were his best years as a dancer. "I got to a level I thought I would never reach, a fusion of technique and artistry. When I was younger I might have been better technically, but I was lacking artistic maturity." Li retired from ballet in 1999 at the age of 38 and joined Bell Potter Securities to establish its Asian desk.

== Mao's Last Dancer ==
In 2003 Li published his autobiography, Mao's Last Dancer. It has received numerous accolades, including the Australian Book of the Year award. In 2008, the children's version of this book, Mao's Last Dancer: The Peasant Prince (illustrated by Anne Spudvilas), won the Australian Publishers Association's Book of the Year for Younger Children and the Queensland Premier's Children's Book Award. In 2026, Li published the sequel, The Lucky Son.

Mao's Last Dancer was adapted into a 2009 feature film of the same name by director Bruce Beresford and writer Jan Sardi, starring Chi Cao, Bruce Greenwood and Kyle MacLachlan. At the São Paulo International Film Festival 2009 the film won Best Foreign Feature Film Audience Award (tied with Broken Embraces). American figure skater Nathan Chen skated to the soundtrack from the film at the 2018 Winter Olympics, winning the long program. Chen, himself extensively trained in ballet, consulted with Li in the development of his on-ice persona during the run-up to the Olympics.

== Personal life ==
Li's first marriage was to Elizabeth Mackey in 1981. They were divorced in 1987.

Mary McKendry and Li were married that same year and now have three children: Sophie (born in 1988), Thomas (1992), and Bridie (1997).

On 20 June 2023, Li announced that he and Mary would retire at the end of 2023, she from the teaching position as principal répétiteur with the ballet company. Li cited a heart condition. Mary has been undergoing treatment for cancer.
