= Mao's Last Dancer (book) =

Book by Li Cunxin

- Cover of Mao's Last Dancer (Young Reader's Edition)
- Author: Li Cunxin
- Language: English
- Genre: Memoir
- Publisher: Penguin Books Australia
- Publication date: 2003
- Publication place: Australia
- Media type: Print (Paperback & Hardback)
- Pages: 445 pp
- ISBN: 0-14-330164-0
- OCLC: 156327916

Mao's Last Dancer is a memoir written by Chinese-Australian ballet dancer and author Li Cunxin and first published in 2003. It recounts his journey from a young, impoverished village boy destined to labor in the fields of China to a world-famous professional dancer.

Following its release, the book was on the best sellers list for more than 18 months and won an Australian Book of the Year award. In 2009, it was adapted into a film of the same name.

In 2026, a sequel titled The Lucky Son was released.

== Character list ==
Li Cunxin
The narrator of the memoir, who grew up in a destitute rural household in China, was selected by the Chinese Communist Party to become a ballet dancer trainee in Madame Mao's Beijing Dance Academy when he was eleven. Later, he got a chance to study abroad in America as an exchange student. After struggling hard, he finally decided not to go back to China, following his destiny of freedom instead

Elizabeth Mackey
Li Cunxin's ex-wife. She met Li Cunxin in the summer at the Houston Ballet and started a secret relationship with him and later she married him when he decided not to go back to China. Although they got divorced eventually, she gave Li the opportunity to stay in America.

Niang
Li Cunxin's mother. She was a rural Chinese woman, as well as a loving mother. In Li's life, she was his impetus, driving him forward while he was in adverse circumstances. She was what gave Li the courage and strength to continue ballet. She was a very important part of Li's life.

Ben Stevenson
One of the leaders of the Houston Ballet Association, as well as Li Cunxin's American dancing guide and host family. He was very nice, and gave much helpful advice to Li.

Dia
Li Cunxin's father. He was a Chinese farmer who was characterized with honesty and tolerance.

Teacher Xiao
One of Li Cunxin's teachers. He is inspirational to Li Cunxin and has helped him face many of his challenges during his ballet career in Beijing.

== Plot ==
Li Cunxin is born into a poor family commune in a small rural village in Shandong Province, where he is destined to work in the fields as a labourer. At first overlooked but selected after a suggestion by his teacher during a school visit, Li seems bewildered by the gruff preliminary inspection screening at the provincial capital city of Qingdao. Selected to travel to Beijing to audition for a place in Madame Mao's Dance Academy, he is admitted to its ballet school after passing a series of physical tests.

Sophie, Cunxin and Mary's first child, is born profoundly deaf, to their devastation. Mary gives up her career to take care of her, and Sophie has led a normal life because of it, also taking dance classes in following in her parents footsteps. They go on to have two more children, perfectly healthy, but decide to move to Mary's home country, Australia. Their farewell performance, Romeo and Juliet, is broadcast live throughout China to five hundred million viewers. In Australia, he keeps dancing, but also gets a job managing one of the largest stock brokerage firms in Australia. He continues to visit his mother and his village, never forgetting where he came from.
