= Daniel Riley (dancer) =

Australian choreographer

- Born: 1985 or 1986 (age 40–41)
- Occupations: Dancer, choreographer of contemporary dance
- Years active: 2005– present
- Known for: Artistic director of Australian Dance Theatre

Daniel Riley (born 1985 or 1986) is an Australian dancer and choreographer. After a long career with Bangarra Dance Theatre in Sydney, since January 2022 he has been the artistic director of the contemporary dance company Australian Dance Theatre, based in Adelaide, South Australia.

== Early life and education ==
Daniel Riley was born in 1985 or 1986. He is of Wiradjuri descent, from western New South Wales. He developed his love of dance at a young age, after watching his sister at her dance studio when he was around nine years told, and was also influenced by the popular musical show Tap Dogs. He started out doing tap dance, and was bullied at school about it. However, he began to realise the cultural significance of dance for Aboriginal Australians, including men.

When he was 13, Riley's family moved to Canberra when his father got a job at Queanbeyan South Public School. His father met and introduced Riley to Elizabeth Cameron Dalman, who recommended the new youth dance studio Quantum Leap (now QL2). Riley spent most of his weekends thereafter at Quantum Leap. He did not realise at the time that Dalman was the founder of Australian Dance Theatre (ADT), until some years later when they toured to Canberra and he was greatly impressed by the style of their contemporary dance. Around that time, he also saw a performance by Bangarra Dance Theatre, and decided that that was where he needed to be.

He graduated from Queensland University of Technology (QUT) in 2006.

== Career ==
Riley has danced and choreographed extensively in Australia and around the world. As of 2022 he had choreographed more than 15 works, for various organisations and festivals.

=== Early career ===
Riley first danced with Leigh Warren & Dancers in South Australia, from 2005 to 2006.

=== Bangarra (2007–2018) ===
Riley spent 12 years with Bangarra, from 2007 to 2018, apart from a year off in 2014–15.

While at Bangarra, he was the youngest male dancer in the company to choreograph a work, creating a work called Riley, which paid tribute to the work of Aboriginal artist Michael Riley (to whom he discovered he was related). He got the idea that he wanted to do this work after seeing an exhibition of his photographs at the National Gallery of Australia in Canberra, while on tour with Bangarra in 2007. After talking to Stephen Page about it, who encouraged him to think about it further, two years later his work premiered as a double bill with a work by Frances Rings at the Sydney Opera House. The work was a huge success.

After dancing with Bangarra for seven years, Riley requested a year off as he felt exhausted and needed time to recharge, and he and his wife headed overseas. During this time, he choreographed shows for the Third Row Dance Company, a student-led group at the University of Roehampton in south London. In 2014 he danced with the New Movement Collective and Fabulous Beast Dance Theatre in the UK.

He spent two weeks choreographing at Louisville Ballet, which was run by former Australian Ballet principal dancer and Bangarra rehearsal director, Robert Curran. He found that challenging, as the dancers were pure ballet dancers, without exposure to contemporary dance. The work, Sacred Shifts premiered in March 2015.

Also during his break from Bangarra, in 2015 Riley was invited in by Rafael Bonachela, choreographer of the Sydney Dance Company, to choreograph a piece for only the female dancers of SDC, as part of the company's three-year "New Breed" initiative for emerging choreographers.

He returned to dance full-time at Bangarra in September 2015. In 2016, along with his cousin Beau Dean Riley Smith, Riley choreographed a piece called Miyagan, which explores their family and cultural heritage. The piece was performed, along with two others, in Brisbane.

=== ADT ===
In June 2021, Riley was appointed as artistic director of Australian Dance Theatre (ADT), Australia's oldest contemporary dance company, based at the Odeon Theatre in Kaurna country in the eastern Adelaide suburb of Norwood. He took over from long-serving director Garry Stewart, assuming the role at the end of 2021. He is the first Indigenous person to become an artistic director of a non-Indigenous dance company in Australia. This responsibility weighs heavily on him, but he was inspired by playwright Wesley Enoch, the first Indigenous artistic director of a major theatre company, at Queensland Theatre. He has remained friends with founder Elizabeth Dalman and they talk often.

The first ADT work under his direction was performed in May 2022, a triptych of dances called Outside Within. In September 2022 Riley presented his first major work, at the Dunstan Playhouse in the Adelaide Festival Centre, called SAVAGE. The performance included nine dance students from Flinders University/AC Arts along with the ADT dancers, and Riley dances in the piece as well.

Riley believes in an evolutionary rather than revolutionary approach, and is dedicated to creating shows that "can only be made here [on Kaurna country], not making work that looks like it's been made by a European company".

=== Other roles and activities ===
Riley worked as associate producer and then creative associate for ILBIJERRI Theatre Company from between 2019 and 2021.

In 2020 he was appointed lecturer in contemporary dance at the Victorian College of the Arts (part of the University of Melbourne) in Melbourne. There he launched Kummarge, a mentoring program for Indigenous dance students. In 2021 he choreographed a piece called WAX, one of three in Atlas | gadhaba kurrawan - weaving and bringing together at the university, performed in November 2021.

He was a board member at Chunky Move (2019–2022), and a board associate at the cultural think tank A New Approach. In 2021 he was a mentor at Moogahlin Performing Arts at Carriageworks in Sydney.

He also has film credits: performing in the music video of Dan Sultan's 2014 song "Under Your Skin", and for Bangarra's Spear (2015), in which he acted and worked as director's attachment.

As of September 2024 Riley is on the board of Tandanya National Aboriginal Cultural Institute.

In September 2024, Riley was appointed a member of First Nations Arts, a newly established division of the government arts funding body Australia Council focused on Aboriginal and Torres Strait Islander arts, for a term of four years.

Riley took part in discussion about the role of storytelling, hosted by the Bob Hawke Prime Ministerial Centre in partnership with WOMADelaide Planet Talks, along with filmmaker Rachel Perkins, and led by playwright Wesley Enoch, in March 2025.

== Recognition ==
Riley was nominated at the Australian Dance Awards (2010, 2013), and for Deadly Awards in 2010, 2012, and 2013.

HE is an honorary fellow at the Faculty of Fine Arts (Dance) at University of Melbourne.

== Personal life ==
Riley is married to Chrissy, and they have children. He is the second cousin of artist Michael Riley.
