= Garry Stewart =

Australian ballet dancer and choreographer

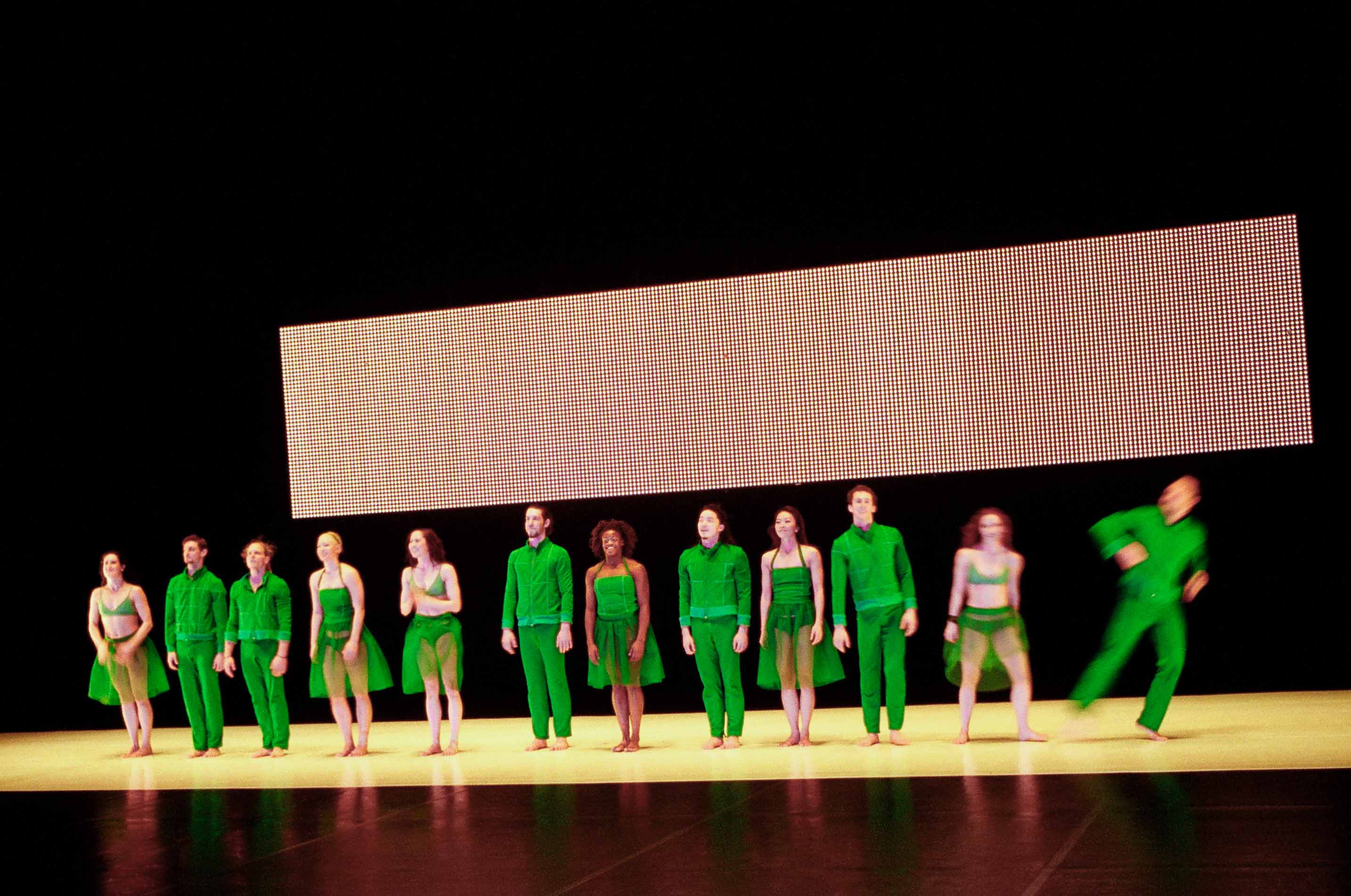
G par Garry Stewart.jpg

Garry Stewart (born 1962) is an Australian dancer and choreographer. He was the longest-serving artistic director of the Australian Dance Theatre, taking over from Meryl Tankard in 1999 and finishing his term at the end of 2021. He is renowned for his unusual, post-modern interpretations of classical ballets.

== Early life and education ==
Garry Stewart was born in 1962.

After abandoning his university studies in social work when he was 20, Stewart studied first in Sydney at the Sydney City Ballet Academy (1983), and then at the Australian Ballet School in Melbourne (1984–1985).

== Dance career ==
He has danced with the Australian Dance Theatre (ADT), the Queensland Ballet, Expressions Dance Company and The One Extra Dance Company (Onex), and has performed in acting roles with the Sydney Theatre Company. He also worked on many independent projects, and in 1989 performed the role of Luke in production of Harold in Italy.

He retired from professional dancing at the end of the 1980s and concentrated on choreography from 1990. In 1995 he co-founded the Melbourne dance company Chunky Move, and two or three years later founded the dance company Thwack! in Sydney, which performed Plastic Space at the Melbourne Festival in October 1999.

On 29 November 1999, Stewart became artistic director of the ADT, based in Adelaide, South Australia, taking over from Meryl Tankard. In 2000, he choreographed his first major work for ADT: Birdbrain, described as "an ironic, post-modern deconstruction" of the classical ballet Swan Lake, which had an immediate impact on the dance world, with its innovative use of yoga, breakdance, gymnastics, video art and electronic music, and ran for around 200 performances around the world.

Other works for ADT which also proved to be hits included The Age of Unbeauty (2002), Devolution (2006), G (2008), Be Your Self (2010), Proximity (2012), and The Beginning of Nature (2018).

The Age of Unbeauty, a piece that incorporated martial arts and gymnastics within the dance performance, had its premiere in February 2002 at the Adelaide Fringe Festival. Stewart said that his inspiration came from the 2001 attack on the World Trade Centre, after the ADT had arrived in New York City just a few weeks after the destruction. The Age dance critic and awards panel judge Hilary Crampton said that Stewart "challenges accepted perceptions of dance performance and also of what is conceived of as a dancer or a dancer's body, so he's pushing the edge".

For Devolution, Stewart collaborated with Canadian robotics expert Louise-Philippe Demers, producing a show with 30 robots on stage.

In April 2006, Stewart co-produced and directed the dance gala "UNIFIED" for UNICEF Australia, to benefit the Gap Youth Centre in Alice Springs for Indigenous Australian young people and an HIV/AIDS program for children in Laos.

G, a fast-paced deconstruction of the romantic ballet Giselle, was first performed at the 2008 Adelaide Festival, followed by an extensive tour of Europe in 2008 and 2009. The work was reprised in November 2021 in Adelaide.

In 2019, to celebrate his 20 years at ADT, the company produced Anthology, a piece comprising parts of six of Stewart's most successful productions.

Due to the COVID-19 pandemic in Australia, the company did not tour throughout 2020 and 2021, but did perform in Adelaide, as South Australia did not have large numbers of people infected with COVID-19 and restrictions were not severe. Stewart's last major original work, Supernature, premiered at the newly renovated Her Majesty's Theatre, Adelaide in March 2021 as part of the Adelaide Festival.

His tenure at ADT ended at the end of 2021, when he handed over the reins to Daniel Riley, making him the longest-serving artistic director of the company, at 22 years. The last performance of G took place at Her Majesty's Theatre exactly 22 years to the day since Stewart's appointment as artistic director of the ADT.

Stewart was also commissioned by the Australian Ballet, Royal Ballet of Flanders, Sydney Dance Company, Rambert Dance Company (UK), Ballet du Rhin, Birmingham Royal Ballet (UK), tanzmainz (Germany), and the Royal New Zealand Ballet. His intentions for the future after ADT include "opening up [his] own practices as an artist working in opera, in film, creating large site-specific projects, and working a bit more nationally and internationally".

== Other roles ==
From 2020 Stewart has been professor in creative arts at Flinders University.

He has sat on the jury for both the Rolex Mentor and Protégé Arts Initiative in Geneva and the International Choreographic Competition Hannover.

== Recognition and awards ==
Stewart's works have been studied in schools and universities.

He has also been recognised by a number of awards, fellowships and the like:

- 2000: For Birdbrain, Best Choreography, Australian Dance Awards
- 2001: Centenary Medal, for service to Australian society and dance
- 2002: For The Age of Unbeauty, Winner, Outstanding Choreographic Achievement, and Outstanding Work by a Company, Australian Dance Awards; Best Choreography, Helpmann Awards
- 2004: Held, Best Choreography, Helpmann Awards
- 2005: For the film Nascent, awards for choreography
- 2006: For Devolution, the Helpmann Awards for Best Choreography and Best New Australian Work; a South Australian Ruby Award for innovation; an Australian Dance Award; and a Green Room Award
- 2007: For Honour Bound (2006), Best Choreography, Australian Dance Awards
- 2008: Artist in Residence, Birmingham International Dance Festival
- 2012–2013: Thinker in Residence at Deakin University, Melbourne
- 2014: Artist in Residence at National Institute of Dramatic Art, Sydney
- 2015: Inaugural Australia Council Award for Outstanding Achievement in Dance
- 2017: Churchill Fellow, for which he did a comparative study of seven major international choreographic centres
- 2019: For The Beginning of Nature, Helpmann Award for Best Dance Production
- 2021: Joint winner of the 2021 South Australian Ruby Award for Lifetime Achievement

Other fellowships and awards include:

- A two-year Australia Council Fellowship to study dance and new technologies
- The Sir Robert Helpmann Fellowship from the New South Wales Ministry for the Arts, to study the Klein Technique (Note: The Klein Technique is a method invented by Susan Klein in the 1970s.) in New York City
  - Other Australian Dance and Green Room Awards

== Selected works ==
=== Choreography ===
- Sydney-based freelance choreographer (1990–1998)
  - Chunky Move Fast Idol / Spectre in the Covert Memory (1995)
  - Sydney Dance Company – Thwack!, and others (1996)
- THWACK (1999), Stewart's own company
  - Plastic Space Melbourne Festival (October 1999)
- Australian Dance Theatre
  - Split, Optima Playhouse, Adelaide (August 1999)
  - House Dance, broadcast on the outside of the main sail of the Sydney Opera House on New Year's Eve 1999
  - Birdbrain (2000–)
  - The Age of Unbeauty (2002–)
  - Nothing (2004)
  - Held (2004), a collaboration with U.S. dance photographer Lois Greenfield, at the 2004 Adelaide Festival
  - Devolution
  - G, 2008 Adelaide Festival, followed by an extensive tour of Europe in 2008 and 2009; reprised in November 2021 in Adelaide
  - Be Your Self (2010)
  - Worldhood (2011), with the Adelaide Centre for the Arts (now Adelaide College of Arts)
  - Proximity, 2012 Adelaide Festival, Melbourne 2013, European tour 2014
- So You Think You Can Dance, 2008 Channel 10 reality television show
- Vocabulary, with Kat Worth from Restless Dance Company (2005)
- Objekt (October 2016), with tanzmainz, the contemporary dance company of Staatstheater Mainz
- The Beginning of Nature (March 2016), with the Zephyr Quartet, performed at Womadelaide
- Honour Bound, based on the experiences of Terry and David Hicks, directed by Nigel Jamieson, commissioned by and performed at the Sydney Opera House (28 July – 3 September 2006) and Malthouse Theatre, Melbourne (September 2006). Toured to The Vienna Festival (May 2007), Holland Festival, Amsterdam (June 2007), Barbican Theatre, London (November 2007) and the New Zealand Festival of the Arts, Wellington (March 2008)
- Rambert Dance Company – Infinity (2007)
- Birmingham Royal Ballet – The Centre and its Opposite (2009)
- Anthology (2019)
- Supernature, Adelaide (March 2021)

=== Film and other media ===
Nascent, a film created by Gina Czarnecki and choreographed by Stewart, was shown at the 2005 Adelaide Film Festival in February–March 2005, and later at other film festivals. It earned several awards:

- Special mention, Napolidanza Videodance Festival, Il Coreografo Elettronico, Naples, Italy, May 2005
- Delegates’ Choice, IMZ Dance Screen, Brighton, England, June 2005
- Dance Film Award, Australian Dance Awards, November 2005
- Winner, Best Dance Film at the ReelDance Awards for Australia and New Zealand, May 2006

In 2015 Stewart was commissioned by the Adelaide Film Festival to create Mood Machine, a short film focusing on the gestures of human emotions.

In 2018, to accompany the stage production The Beginning of Nature, Stewart directed a 360-degree virtual reality project, featuring dancers performing in various natural landscapes, The Beginning of Nature in VR.

In 2018–2019 he created The Circadian Cycle, a short film filmed in across contrasting landscapes in South Australia.

He was choreographer for the TV series Stateless (TV series) (2020). starring Cate Blanchett, Yvonne Strahovski and Dominic West
