= Barnumbirr =

Aboriginal Australian mythology associated with the planet Venus

Barnumbirr, Bunumbirr, Morning Star
- Yolngu creator-spirit
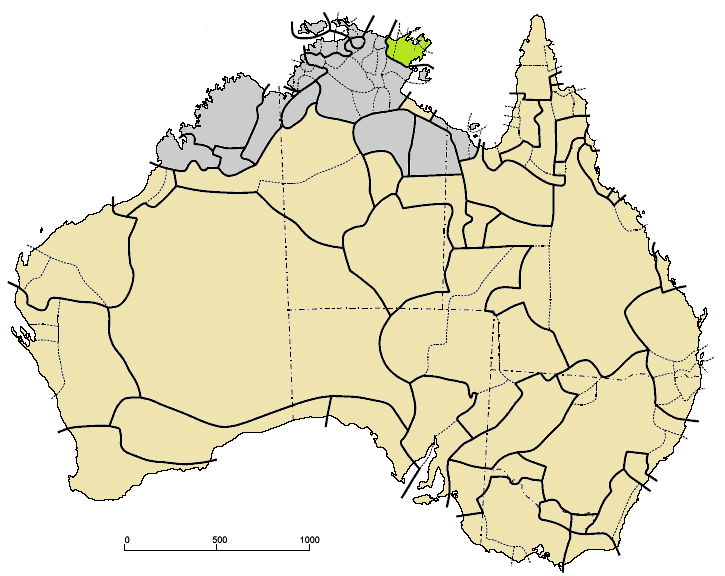
- Map showing the geographical location of the Yolngu language group (Highlighted in green).
- Other names: Banumbirr, Morning Star
- Affiliation: Creation, Death
- Planet: Venus
- Artefacts: Morning Star Pole
- Gender: Female
- Region: Arnhem Land, Northern Territory, Australia
- Ethnic group: Yolngu
- Festivals: Morning Star Ceremony

Barnumbirr, also spelt Bunumbirr or Banumbirr and also known as the Morning Star, is a creator-spirit in the Yolngu culture of Arnhem Land in the Northern Territory of Australia, who is identified as the planet Venus. In Yolngu Dreaming mythology, she is believed to have guided the first humans, the Djanggawul sisters, to Australia. After the Djanggawul sisters arrived safely near Yirrkala (at Yalangbara) in North East Arnhem Land, Barnumbirr flew across the land from east to west, creating a songline which named and created the animals, plants, and geographical features.

Songlines were an important navigational tool for Aboriginal people. The route that Barnumbirr flew above northern Australia became a songline that spans multiple language groups and was therefore useful for travelling Yolngu and their neighbours. Research suggests that this songline through the Northern Territory and Western Australia, and others tracing paths in New South Wales and Queensland, have formed part of Australia’s network of motorways.

Barnumbirr has a strong association with death in Yolngu culture. The "Morning Star Ceremony" corresponds with the rising of Barnumbirr and is a time when living Yolngu, with the help of Barnumbirr and the "Morning Star Pole", can communicate with their ancestors on Bralgu (var. Baralku), their final resting place.

== Role in creation ==
Barnumbirr as a Morning Star is a creator spirit in Yolngu culture. Her story is part of the Dhuwa moiety. Yolngu songlines depict Barnumbirr guiding the Djanggawul sisters as they row a canoe from the mythical island of Bralgu (the home of Wangarr, the Great Creator Spirit) to discover Australia and bring Madayin Law to the Dhuwa people. Once the sisters found land near Yirrkala in North East Arnhem Land, Barnumbirr is believed to have continued flying eastward creating a song-line which includes descriptions of flora, fauna, geographical features and clan borders. Barnumbirr’s songline therefore formed the basis of Madayin Law and the Yolngu understanding of the land.

== Relationship with death ==
Barnumbirr has strong associations with death for Yolngu people. The rising of Barnumbirr in the sky before sunrise is a time when the Yolngu conduct the "Morning Star Ceremony". As Venus becomes visible in the early hours before dawn, the Yolngu say that she draws behind her a rope that is connected to the island of Bralgu. Along this rope, with the aid of a richly decorated "Morning Star Pole", Yolngu people are able to release the spirits of their dead and communicate with their ancestors.

Research suggests that this light is likely zodiacal light, caused by extraterrestrial dust reflecting light from the Solar System. This ‘rope’ is important in Yolngu mythology because it prevents Barnumbirr from straying too far from Bralgu and facilitates communication between dead and living people.

=== The Morning Star Ceremony ===
The Morning Star Ceremony is a mortuary ceremony of the Dhuwa moiety. In Dhuwa mythology, the Wangarr (Yolngu ancestors) perform the Morning Star ceremony every night of Venus’ synodic period. In the real world, the Morning Star Ceremony is an important part of the funeral process for a small number of Yolngu clans. The ceremony begins at dusk and continues through the night, reaching a climax when Barnumbirr rises trailing a rope of light to connect with Bralgu. When Barnumbirr rises, the spirits of those who have recently died are released with the help of the Ceremony to Wangarr, the spirit-world.

==== Planning the Morning Star Ceremony ====
Due to its scale and importance, the "Morning Star Ceremony" requires a significant level of planning. It occurs over the course of the night prior the first rising of Venus after a synodic period of approximately 584 days. Venus can then be seen as a Morning Star for approximately 263 days. The Yolngu people count the days of Venus’ synodic period to track the motion of Venus and plan the Morning Star Ceremony

=== The Morning Star Pole ===
The Morning Star Pole is a decorated ceremonial piece used in the Morning Star Ceremony. It is used to communicate with ancestors on Bralgu and is designed to depict Barnumbirr, its tail of zodiacal light and neighbouring celestial bodies. Each Morning Star Pole is unique to individual craftsmen and clans and therefore unique in appearance (Gurriwiwi, 2009).

Attached to the top of the pole are feathers from a variety of birds which represent the Morning Star itself (Norris, 2016; Gurriwiwi, 2009). The pole is coloured with traditional patterns in ochre paint and together are a representation of the artist and their surrounding environment. Pandanus strings attach more feathers to the pole. These strings represent the string of light that attaches Barnumbirr to Bralgu as well as neighbouring stars and planets.

==== Public interest in Morning Star poles ====
Morning Star poles have attracted attention from art galleries and collectors across the world. Poles have been exhibited in a number of major Australian galleries and museums including QAGOMA, the Museum of Contemporary Art Australia, the Art Gallery of NSW and the Australian National Maritime Museum. Gali Yalkarriwuy Gurruwiwi is a Yolngu man from Elcho Island in Arnhem Land. He is a Morning Star custodian, maker and artist of Morning Star poles which have been displayed in galleries across the world. Gurriwiwi expresses a desire to use his art as a way bring people together and teach them about Yolngu culture. This desire to share indigenous culture with non-aboriginal people via Morning Star Poles is also shared by fellow Arnhem Land artist Bob Burruwal.

== Venus in other Australian Indigenous cultures ==
Venus is the third brightest object in the night sky and because of this there are numerous cultural interpretations of Venus as a Morning and Evening Star across Australia’s Indigenous groups. The literature is sparse on the details of many of these interpretations, and in some cases cultural limitations prevent information from being shared. There are, however, relatively detailed recounts of the Euahlayi and Kamilaroi, Arrernte and Queensland Gulf Country people’s interpretations.

=== Kamilaroi and Euahlayi ===
The Kamilaroi and Euahlayi peoples of Northern New South Wales interpret Venus as a morning star differently to the Yolngu but it shares similar significance. The story of the Eagle-hawk (Muliyan) is recounted in Reed Fuller and Hamacher & Banks. The eagle-hawk once lived in a large Yarran tree and hunted people for food near the Barwon River. One day, a group of men set out after him to avenge his killing of their people. The men set fire to the tree and killed Muliyan. The eagle-hawk then ascended into the sky as Muliyangah, the morning star. Euahlayi/Kamilaroi people interpret Muliyangah as the eyes of Baayami (Baiame) watching over the earth during the night.

Due to Baayami’s cultural significance, Kamilaroi/Euahlayi people also place great importance on a Morning Star Ceremony but cultural sensitivities prevent much detail from being revealed in the literature. Fuller’s research does explain, however, that Venus rising as an evening star is a sign to light a sacred fire. This fire is re-lit every night until Venus rises as a Morning Star and the flame is extinguished. Like the Yolngu version this ceremony also includes the use of a wooden pole, but in this case it is held horizontally as a symbol of connection between dark and light peoples (the two moieties of the Kamilaroi/Euahlayi), and the unity of marriage. The Euahlayi/Kamilaroi also require an understanding of the celestial movements of Venus. The literature is unclear, however, on how Euahlayi/Kamilaroi elders predict the date Venus rises.

=== Arrernte ===
Venus as a morning and evening star are a central component of the Arrernte interpretation of Tnorala. Tnorala is a 5-kilometre-wide, 250-metre-tall ring-shaped mountain range 160 km (99 mi) west of Alice Springs. Arrernte people believe that in the creation period, a group of women took the form of stars and danced the Corroboree in the Milky Way. As they danced, one of the women dropped a baby which then fell to earth and formed the indent that can be seen in the ring-shaped mountain range. The baby’s parents, the morning star (father) and evening star (mother), continue to take turns looking for their baby.Arrernte parents warn their children not to stare at the morning or evening stars because the baby’s parents may mistake a staring child for their own and take them away.

=== North Queensland Gulf Country Aboriginal peoples ===
Similarities can be found between creator role of Barnumbirr in Yolngu culture, and the Morning Star as a creator spirit in North Queensland's Gulf Country Dreaming. Gulf country Aboriginal peoples believed that two brothers, the moon (older) and the morning star (younger) travel across the landscape in the creation period, using a boomerang to create features of the landscape such as valleys, hills and seas.

== Further interpretations ==
=== Songlines and mapping ===
For Aboriginal Australians, songlines (also called "Dreaming Tracks") are an oral map of the landscape, setting out trading routes, and often connecting sacred sites. Song-lines on the land are often mirrored, or mirrors of, "paths" connecting stars and planets in the sky. Star maps are also play an important role as mnemonics to aid in the memory of songlines.

The path that Barnumbirr is believed to have travelled from west to east across northern Australia is recounted in a songline that tracks a navigable route through the landscape. Mountains, waterholes and clan boundaries are mentioned throughout the song and it therefore became an important navigational tool for travelling Yolngu and their neighbours.

=== Songlines and Australia's highway network ===
There is new research suggesting that these song-lines form the basic route of significant sections of Australia’s highway network. Colonial explorers and mappers used Indigenous peoples as guides, who navigated using their star maps when travelling through the land. It is hypothesised that these Dreaming tracks were then solidified by the construction and subsequent upgrade of modern roads. By matching star maps from Euahlayi and Kamilaroi cultures with maps of modern Australian roads in northern NSW, Fuller finds strong similarities. Harney and Wositsky and Harney & Norris also argue that the Barnumbirr songline sets a course similar to that of the Victoria Highway across the Northern Territory:

They call it the Victorian Highway now, but it was never the Victorian Highway at all – it was just the original Aboriginal walking track right through Arnhem Land.

The historical evidence surrounding this concept is sparse but more recent work is uncovering the significance of song-lines (related to Barnumbirr and otherwise) in forming the basis for modern Australian roads.

== In the arts and media ==
=== Dance ===
Banula Marika collaborated with founder of the Australian Dance Theatre, choreographer Elizabeth Cameron Dalman, in a dance performance entitled Morning Star (2012–3). Marika is custodian of the Morning Star story, and served as cultural consultant on the work. The Mirramu Dance Company performed Morning Star in March 2013 at the James O. Fairfax Theatre, National Gallery of Australia in Canberra.

=== Film ===
A forthcoming documentary film entitled Morning Star, about renowned elder and master maker and player of the yidaki, Djalu Gurruwiwi, is as of January 2021 in the post-production phase.

== See also ==
- Australian Aboriginal astronomy
- Australian Aboriginal religion and mythology
