= Dance Hub SA =

Former Australian contemporary dance company

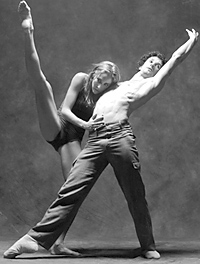
Leigh Warren & Dancers performing Quick Brown Fox at White Bird in Portland, Oregon, US

Dance Hub SA, formerly Leigh Warren & Dancers or Leigh Warren + Dancers (LWD) and then LWDance Hub, was a contemporary dance company based in the South Australian capital of Adelaide. Formed in 1993 by Leigh Warren, the company toured internationally and won several awards. The company closed due to lack of funding in mid-2024.

In its 2019 incarnation as Dance Hub SA, it has increasingly taken on the role of peak body within the state, playing an advocacy and education role for dancers and choreographers. It is a community space for both emerging and established artists, with a program that includes artists-in-residence and an international exchange program.

== History ==
=== 1993: creation ===
The dance troupe was formed in 1993 by Leigh Warren (formerly of the Australian Dance Theatre), named Leigh Warren + Dancers, which moved into the loft studio of the newly created Lion Arts Centre, on the corner of North Terrace and Morphett Street, Adelaide.

=== 2011: loss of funding ===
The company lost its funding from the Australia Council as well as a guarantee of similar funding from Arts SA in 2011, leaving it to rely on major sponsors and benefactors and smaller funding bodies.

=== 2014: New director? ===
In 2014, Warren handed over the reins first as resident choreographer, then (in 2015) as artistic director to the 28-year-old dancer and choreographer Daniel Jaber, who, like Warren, had established his skills with the Australian Dance Theatre. His work was in contemporary ballet rather than contemporary dance, but he hoped to "present everything from super experimental work to the high gloss stuff". He had considered changing the company’s name from Leigh Warren Dance (sic) to Daniel Jaber Dance in the future, but thinks it is more likely that LWD would remain in any change of name.)

However, only a year later came the news that Jaber had departed for Los Angeles and that LWD would be transformed into a dance hub, "a dedicated dance arts venue and incubator that supports and develops mid career, independent and emerging artists". Jaber cited lack of funding as the main reason for his departure: the Australia Council triennial funding had expired in 2012, and the company had been surviving on project grants ever since. Only one out of nine of Jaber's applications for funding for 2015 had been successful: the SA government had contributed a grant of A$50,000, which was hardly enough to pay a single salary. There were other reasons too, some personal, but he was working on forming a new company which would work across international borders. Jaber pointed to some successful developments at the company under his management – workshops and masterclasses with some of the best dancers from around the country, and the establishment of an education and community program and the appointment of an education manager, Kialea-Nadine Williams.

=== 2016: LWDance Hub ===
With the competitive dance industry competing over support for the independent dance sector and the failed future artistic director of the Leigh Warren Dancers Company. In 2016, Warren reshaped the company to accommodate the reduced funding, rebranding it as LWDance Hub, relying on residencies, workshops and open house sessions for performers and choreographers to hone their skills. This was also to maintain the studio space that is government funded that has now been taken over by State Theater.

From early 2018 through to July 2019, the LWDance Hub supported 33 creative endeavours, presented 25 new works for the Adelaide Fringe and SALA Festival, and had 200 artists take part in its programs.

=== 2019: Dance Hub SA ===
In July 2019, Warren handed over the artistic directorship to choreographer and multimedia artist Amanda Phillips, at the same time renaming the company Dance Hub South Australia (later changing this to Dance Hub SA, with Warren staying on as patron).

Dance Hub SA was officially launched in August 2019, with the rebranding reinforcing the organisation as the peak body for dance in the state. The "Mind The Gap" residency program is a partnership with Tasmanian company TasDance, and the Artist in Residence program. The inaugural artist on a new international exchange program would be Wu Chien-Wei, from Taiwan's Tussock Dance Theatre.

=== 2024: closure ===
After delivering its last program, Choreolab24, which supported the development of eight dancers over three weeks in April–May 2024, the board of Dance Hub SA announced its closure due to lack of ongoing funding. Since 2022 it had had to rely on project funding grants, and it really needed premises and organisational funding. At the time of its closure, the artistic director was Amanda Phillips, and chair of the board was Kylie Kerrigan.

== Selected Leigh Warren dance works ==
Leigh Warren's company's dance works include:

- Quiver (1997 in Adelaide and Canberra; 1998 in Brisbane)
- Shimmer (1999 – toured widely in Australia; also filmed for ABC TV)
- Masterpieces of the 20th C (1999)
- Silent Cries (1999)
- Wanderlust: a collaboration with Japanese choreographer Uno Man (2007)
- Frame and Circle: Choreographers: Prue Lang Rubicon and Leigh Warren Meridian (2010 at The Space in the Adelaide Festival Centre)
- Dreamscape, consisting of two works: Dream Time: (previously choreographed by Jiri Kylian, premiered in 1983) and Escape (choreographed by Leigh Warren and Kaiji Moriyama (2011; part of the 5th OzAsia Festival, and with music by Simon Tedeschi)
- Quick Brown Fox: a collaboration with William Forsythe (for the 2001 Melbourne Festival)
- Petroglyths — Signs of Life: a collaboration with Gina Rings (2005 & 2008)
- medico manouevres (2007 & 2009)
- Seven (2008)
- Astor Piazzolla's Maria de Buenos Aires with State Opera of South Australia (2010)
- The Philip Glass Trilogy, first separately, and then in its entirety (August 2014, at Her Majesty's Theatre, Adelaide, choreographed by Warren)
  - Akhnaten (also on its own in 2002 in Adelaide and 2003 in Melbourne)
  - Einstein on the Beach (also on its own in 2006 at the Festival Theatre, Adelaide, in the Festival Centre)
  - Satyagraha (also on its own in 2007 at the Dunstan Playhouse in the Festival Centre)
- Reassessment: (August 2014, Adelaide Festival Centre, choreographed by Daniel Jaber)

== Awards ==
1997 – Inaugural Adelaide Critics' Circle Award

- Best Performance by a Group — LWD for Quiver

1999 – Australian Dance Awards

- Outstanding Performance by a Dance Company — for Masterpieces of the 20thC
- Best Choreography — Leigh Warren for Shimmer
- Outstanding Performance by an Individual Dance Artist — Delia Silvan for Silent Cries

2000 – The Sidney Myer Performing Arts Awards

- Group Award Winner

2001 – Green Room Award

- Best Female Performer — Rachel Jenson for Quick Brown Fox
- Best Male Performer — Peter Furness for Quick Brown Fox
- Best Ensemble — Quick Brown Fox

2002 – Adelaide Critics' Circle

- Commendation for Akhnaten

2003 – Green Room Award

- Best Dance Ensemble — for Akhnaten

2004 – Adelaide Critics' Circle

- Individual Award — Leigh Warren for Einstein on the Beach (Parts 3 & 4)

2005 – Adelaide Critics' Circle

- Innovation Award — Leigh Warren and Gina Rings for Petroglyphs — Signs of Life

2010 – Australia Business Arts Foundation (AbaF) inaugural Arts & Health Foundation Award

- Leigh Warren & Dancers with the Flinders Medical Centre for medico manouevres

== In film ==
A number of dancers from the company performed in the film The Diaries of Vaslav Nijinsky (2001), made by Paul Cox.
