= John Morphett (architect) =

John Morphett AM OBE
- Born: John Neville Morphett; 1 August 1932; Johor Bahru, Malaysia
- Died: 25 March 2016 (aged 83); Orange, New South Wales
- Education: University of Adelaide; South Australian School of Mines and Industries; Massachusetts Institute of Technology
- Occupation: Architect
- Spouse: Vivienne June Williams
- Awards: Australian Institute of Architects Gold Medal (2000)
- Practice: Hassell
- Buildings: Bragg Laboratories, 1962
- Projects: Adelaide Festival Theatre, 1972

John Neville Morphett AM OBE (1 August 1932 – 25 March 2016) was an Australian architect, known for his role as lead designer of the Adelaide Festival Centre.

== Early life and education ==
John was born in Johor Bahru, Malaya, a son of surveyor John William Morphett and his wife Nellie, née Ireland. He was educated at Christ Church Grammar School, Perth and St Peter's College, Adelaide, and studied architecture at the University of Adelaide and the South Australian School of Mines and Industries.

During university semester breaks, Morphett worked part-time for architects Hassell, McConnell and Partners, with whom he was employed after graduation, and had a continuing relationship for forty years. He undertook further training in architecture at the Massachusetts Institute of Technology Graduate School, where lecturers included Le Corbusier, Philip Johnson, Richard Neutra and Paul Rudolph, and graduated with a Master of Architecture degree. From 1957 to 1961 was employed with The Architects' Collaborative in Boston, where he was involved in a collaboration with Walter Gropius.

== Career in Adelaide ==
In 1962 Morphett returned to Adelaide and joined Hassell, McConnell and Partners. He was made a partner in Hassell Architects in 1967 and a director in 1975. He became managing director of the Hassell Group in 1979, and in 1992 was made chairman of Hassell Pty Ltd.

He retired in 1997, but continued to act as a consultant to the company.

The works which he is most associated are the Bragg Laboratories for the University of Adelaide (1962) and the Adelaide Festival Centre, which opened in 1973 and is regarded as notable example of Modernist architecture.

== Other interests ==
Morphett had a range of interests and memberships:

- He was a member of the Adelaide Chamber of Commerce and its successors the Chamber of Commerce and Industry SA Inc. and the Employers’ Chamber. He was a board member of the Australian Chamber of Commerce from 1990 to 1992.
- He served on the National Trust of SA council 1985/1986).
- He was a board member of the Australian Dance Theatre.
- He was a member of Jaycees and Rotary International.
- He was a member of the Adelaide Festival of the Arts board and its Chairman 2001/2002.

== Recognition ==
- 1956: Associate of the South Australian Institute of Architects
- 1981—1982: President, SA Chapter of the Royal Australian Institute of Architects (RAIA)
- 1997: RAIA State President's Medal
- 1996: Member of the Order of Australia
- 1996: Officer of the Order of the British Empire (OBE)
- 2000: RAIA Gold Medal

== Family ==
John Morphett married Vivienne June Williams in 1955 and they had four sons and a daughter.
