= Mirramu Dance Company =

Australian contemporary dance company

Mirramu Dance Company is an Australian contemporary dance company founded in early 2002 by Australian dance pioneer Elizabeth Cameron Dalman (the founder of Australian Dance Theatre) and dancer-choreographer Vivienne Rogis.

The company is based at Mirramu Creative Arts Centre on the shores of Lake George, New South Wales; it is primarily a project-based company, gathering together its dancers to develop and perform projects on an as-needs basis. It has performed in every Australian city (with performances at the Australian National Gallery, the Workworks Gallery and smaller more intimate venues) and internationally, including Bulgaria, Taiwan, U.S.A, Italy, New Zealand and France.

It has a cross-cultural emphasis with strong involvement from Indigenous Australian dancers as well as Japan, and has a close relationship with the Taiwanese Grace Hsiao Dance Theatre. It also has a strong community focus, and collaborates across media and performance disciplines, working with sculptors, painters and multimedia artists.

== Performances ==
Mirramu Dance Company performances include

=== 2002 - Silk ===
In collaboration with Kyoko Sato, Mobius Kiryuho practitioner from Japan was guest teacher for the Silk project. "The silk story itself—the basic and simple beginnings of the silkworm, through the cocoon stage, to the spinning of the silk and finally to its sophisticated and complex outcome in fashion houses around the world—became an allegory for the choreography."

=== 2008 - Tango Lament ===
In February 2008 Mirramu performed Tango Lament, a piece inspired by the work of Scottish artist Jack Vettriano, along with two other works, as part of the Multicultural Festival in Canberra. Tango Lament included guest dancer Aida Amirkhania from Los Angeles. Some of the performances were later included in Weereewa - A Festival of Lake George, on 29 March.

=== 2013 - Morning Star ===
The Mirramu Dance Company performed Morning Star in March 2013 at the James O. Fairfax Theatre, at the National Gallery of Australia in Canberra. Banula Marika, who is custodian of the Morning Star (Barnumbirr) story, collaborated with Dalman on the work, serving as cultural consultant.
