= Elizabeth Cameron Dalman =

Australian choreographer (born 1934)

Elizabeth Cameron Dalman AM
- Born: 1934 (age 91–92); Adelaide, South Australia
- Education: University of Wollongong (MA); University of Western Sydney (PhD)
- Occupations: Choreographer, teacher
- Years active: 1960–
- Known for: Founder of Australian Dance Theatre

Elizabeth Cameron Dalman AM (nee Wilson; born 1934) is an Australian choreographer, teacher, and performer. She founded Australian Dance Theatre and was its artistic director from 1965 to 1975. She is also the founding director of Mirramu Dance Company.

== Early life and education ==
Elizabeth Wilson was born in 1934 in the Adelaide eastern suburb of Tusmore. Her father, Sir Keith Cameron Wilson, was a lawyer and politician and her mother, Elizabeth Hornabrook (nee Bonython), was an art lover. Dalman began dancing when she was three years old and studied dance during her school years.

She attended Presbyterian Girls' College (now Seymour College), and commenced studies at the University of Adelaide. However, she dropped out because she was more interested in pursuing dance.

She trained in dance first with Nora Stewart, who taught her classical ballet as well as modern techniques espoused by British dancer and choreographer Margaret Morris. In 1957 Elizabeth travelled to London to study dance. There, watching a performance of modern dance by Jose Limon's company, she decided that this was the way that she wanted to dance.

=== Later qualifications ===
In 1994 Dalman earned a Masters of Creative Arts degree from University of Wollongong.

In 2012 she was conferred a doctorate in dance (PhD) from the University of Western Sydney for her thesis entitled "The Quest for an Australian Dance Theatre".

== Career ==
In the late 1950s, Dalman also studied in Europe and New York, and worked with Murray Louis, James Truitte, and Alwin Nikolais.

Dalman won a position at the Ballet der Lage Landen in the Amsterdam, Netherlands, then moved back to Australia, and then back to the Netherlands and after that to Germany. The Netherlands was very progressive and other international artists toured there, but Germany was still recovering from World War II. While in Germany around 1958 while studying dance at the Folkwangshule, she met Colombian-American choreographer Eleo Pomare, son of a Haitian mother and African father, who became her most important mentor. He was known for making political statements in his dance works. Pomare later followed her to Amsterdam, where he established the Eleo Pomare Modern Dance Company (1960-1963), and the two remained friends until his death in August 2008. She was particularly influenced by Pomare's style of dance, and wanted to dance in the same strong passionate style.

She also spent time in New York again, where she studied with Martha Graham for three months in 1966.

=== ADT ===
Back in Adelaide in 1965, she formed the Australian Dance Theatre and for ten years was artistic director. At the time, she was the first to bring modern dance to Adelaide, which began as a rebellion against classical ballet, and her shows were often scathingly reviewed. However, she travelled to the regions, where she had appreciative audiences, with some people travelling hundreds of miles to see a performance. In 1967, she created piece in protest at Australian involvement in the Vietnam War, called Sundown, and was labelled an "angry woman" as a result.

As ADT's chief choreographer, she created over 30 works during this period, often using scores commissioned from Australian composers and designs by little known Australian visual artists who would later become household names. She took the company on international tours, including to Italy, Switzerland, and Holland (1968), throughout South East Asia, India, and Papua New Guinea (1971), and New Zealand (1972). In 1971, the company toured to Taipei, which began a long connection between Dalman and Taiwanese dancers.

In 1975 she was forced to leave the ADT, when the whole company was sacked after a funding dispute.

In 2013, Dalman became patron of the ADT, announced at a reception for the company at Government House

For the Adelaide Festival in February 2025, on the occasion of the 60th anniversary of the ADT, Dalman returned to help train the dancers for the performance of their collaborative work, A Quiet Language. Artistic director Daniel Riley wanted to capture some of the spirit and energy of the early days of the company, when events called "happenings" were held; parties where artists of all disciplines came together and experimented with creating new things.

=== Europe ===
After departing ADT in 1975, Dalman moved overseas again to live in a small Italian village near the French border. The children of the village learned she was a dancer (una ballerina), and they convinced her to teach them dance in the local church hall and around the village outdoors in exchange for Italian lessons. She went on to found a dance school in Ventimiglia as well as a youth dance theatre that held yearly performances. Dalman started re-mounting ADT works on her students that she and Pomare had originally choreographed. Some performances were held in picturesque locations like the Forte dell'Annunziata in Ventimiglia Alta that had a Mediterranean views of the Italo-French Riviera.

In 1985 she was rehearsal director for American artist Anna Sokolow's Rooms and The Troubled Sleeper, and for Doris Humphrey's Day on Earth in Amsterdam. She also performed in the Solo Festival in Goes in the Netherlands.

Returning to Australia in 1986, Dalman continued her career in both performance and choreography.

=== Mirramu Creative Arts Centre ===
1989 saw Dalman move from Adelaide to a rural property on the shores of Lake George/Weerewa, in New South Wales near Canberra which she called Mirramu (a name that revealed itself in a dream). There she built a dance studio and formed the Mirramu Creative Arts Centre, a Natural retreat for performing and visual artists, writers, and healing practitioners. Outdoors is the favoured location for artistic inspiration activities, and performances. The Mirramu calendar continues to include summer solstice events where all who attend participate and celebrate together outdoors.

=== Mirramu Dance Company ===
In 2002 she co-founded Mirramu Dance Company (with Vivienne Rogis) and was and is inaugural artistic director.

Mirramu performed at the March 2008 Weereewa - A Festival of Lake George event, and again in 2014, along with dancers from Malaysia and Taiwan.

== Miscellaneous activities ==
In 1999, Dalman founded "Weereewa – A Festival of Lake George", which was held in Bungendore, New South Wales. The festival showcased visual and performance artists and writers, and continued more or less biennially until at least 2014.

In May 2015 Dalman staged Fortuity, a tribute to the ADT and work from Mirramu, at the Canberra Theatre Centre. She both narrated and performed in the performance.

In 2016, aged 82, Dalman featured in Sue Healey's film En Route, along with the 102-year-old Eileen Kramer and many other dancers.

In late 2016, she was invited play the role of the mother of the prince in a reimagined dance theatre piece, Swan Lake, by Irish choreographer Michael Keegan-Dolan. The production toured Dublin, Copenhagen, and London.

Dalman was a mentor and board member of the Australian Choreographic Centre in Canberra, and she has collaborated extensively with Indigenous dancers.

She has taught in Australian universities, and travelled as a performer, choreographer, teacher and researcher, including to Taiwan, Japan, and West Africa.

== Recognition and awards ==
Dalman won five Canberra Critics' Circle Awards for choreography and production between 1990 and 2015.

- 1994: Australian Artists Creative Fellowship, for five years
- 1995: Medal of the Order of Australia (OAM), for her contribution to contemporary dance in Australia
- 1997: Lifetime Achievement Award from the Australian Dance Awards for achievement in dance
- 2004: ArtsACT Creative Artist Fellowship, Canberra
- 2015: Inducted into the Australian Dance Awards Hall of Fame
- 2015: CityNews Artist of the Year
- 2020: Anthea da Silva's painting of Dalman, entitled Elizabeth, winner of the inaugural Darling Portrait Prize
- 2025: Member of the Order of Australia for "significant service to contemporary dance as a director, performer and teacher"
- 2025: Chevalier de l’Ordre des Arts et des Lettres (The Knight of the Order of Arts and Letters)

== Personal life ==
Elizabeth met her husband, Jan Dalman, in the Netherlands, and took the name Elizabeth Cameron Dalman. They married in 1963, and not long afterwards moved to Adelaide together under the Netherlands Australia Migration Arrangement, where Jan established a photography business and Elizabeth created her dance school. were together for 12 years and had a son, Andreas.

Jan Dalman was likely the only photographer who was permitted by mime artist Marcel Marceau to take photographs of him from the stage while he was performing to a live audience. During his later life, Jan Dalman carefully chose a selection of his best photos of the mime, wishing to publish a book to honour Marceau. After Jan's death, Andreas and Elizabeth fulfilled their promise to Jan to publish his photographs of Marceau in a volume titled out of silence: Marcel Marceau by Jan Dalman. The text stories from interviews with Jan about his friendship with Marceau appear in English and in French translation side-by-side and create alternating interludes image and story.

As of March 2025 and since around 1995, Dalman has lived near Canberra, on her 100-acre (40 ha) bushland property, Mirramu, at Bungendore.

== Selected works ==
- 1966: Hallucinations
- 1966: This Train
- 1967: Landscape
- 1967: Sundown
- 1968: Sun and Moon
- 1969: Homage to Botticelli
- 1969: Creation
- 1972: Release of an Oath
- 1972: Limousine for Janis (choreography: Eleo Pomare; music: Janis Joplin's 1971 song Mercedes-Benz)
- 1974: Inside
