= Migrant hostels of South Australia =

Temporary homes for migrants from the 1940s to the 1980s

Migrant hostels of South Australia were hostels (also referred to as migrant camps, work camps, reception centres, and holding centres) where thousands of migrants passed from the 1940s to the 1980s. In South Australia, there were multiple sites in use, which provided temporary homes to a wide range of migrants, from Displaced Persons and refugees, through to "Ten Pound Poms". They were funded by the commonwealth and state governments and often established on vacated military sites.

== Background ==
Post war immigration to Australia contributed significantly to the population of South Australia. This was the era of "populate or perish" and the Federal Government sought to increase the population of Australia by campaigns to encourage, through "assisted passage" schemes, migrants from the United Kingdom. However, insufficient Britons took up the opportunity and so Australia opened its doors to more migrants from non-British sources.

A war-devastated Europe provided a huge source of migrants. However Australians, accustomed to pro-British and "White Australia" policies were initially wary of non-British looking migrants. When these barriers had been overcome to some degree, the "New Australians" arrived in large numbers. Many migrants came to South Australia.

All the migrants, no matter where they came from, needed to be temporarily accommodated until they obtained employment and accommodation. Hence migrant hostels were created. These sometimes consisted of clusters of World War 2 Nissen huts. Others may have been vacant government buildings once used for other purposes (e.g., former army barracks, "Cheer Up" entertainment huts from the World Wars).

Sometimes these hostels were located in cheaper industrial suburbs. The federal government considered that it was not bound by state health inspection and pricing regulations. Living conditions in the hostels were basic and the cause of dissatisfaction at times. For example, a rent strike and protest occurred at Finsbury in 1952, which then spread to hotels in other states.

== List ==
In South Australia, the hostels in use were:

=== Commonwealth ===
- Finsbury (Pennington) Hostel - Opening in January 1950, it was first known as the Finsbury Hostel and renamed Pennington Hostel in October 1966. It was established by the Commonwealth Migrant Workers Accommodation Division in 1950 and was located on Grand Junction Road, between Addison Road and Glenroy Street. It consisted of converted army Nissen huts and sheds. Migrants could stay there for up to five years. The hostel closed in November 1985.
- Gawler (Willaston) Hostel - Located in the former RAAF base in Willaston, it operated from February 1949 to September 1952, then again from June 1955 to circa 1960.
- Glenelg Hostel - Glenelg Hostel opened in 1950 just south of the new Adelaide airport site and closed in July 1972. The hostel consisted of Nissen huts, and one Nissen hut still stands and is now used as storage.
- Mallala Hostel - Located at the former RAAF base in Mallala and operated circa 1949 to 1953.
- Mannum Hostel - Operated circa 1950 to December 1954 on land purchased by the commonwealth government.
- Mount Barker - Intended as a site for British immigrants, land was purchased in February 1951 but remained undeveloped and was sold in July 1953.
- Rosewater Hostel - Rosewater Hostel was near Port Adelaide and consisted of big 1-acre (4,000 m^{2}) woolsheds divided up into rows of cubicles inside, with wire mesh ceilings. It operated between July 1949 and February 1953, with final residents transferring to Finsbury or Gepps Cross.
- Salisbury Hostel - Located in Salisbury, planning was approved in May 1949 but abandoned in mid-June.
- Seaton Park - Land was purchased but not developed.
- Smithfield Hostel - From March 1949 until July 1971, Smithfield Migrant Hostel was home to many migrants. Situated on Section 3163, in the Hundred of Munno Para, the hostel accommodated up to 300 people at one time. It was in a former army ordnance depot between Coventry Road and the Gawler railway line. Accommodation was provided free of charge until the breadwinner of the family found work and then there would be a charge. After twelve months, a special application was required if the family wished to stay on. The hostel closed when the Commonwealth Migration Programme slowed and new migrants could be given accommodation at Finsbury.
- Wingfield - The site was used as a temporary migrant school until late 1952 then sold in June 1953.
- Woodside Hostel - Woodside Hostel was an army camp in the Adelaide Hills and accommodation was in converted wooden barracks. It was in use from 1949 until 1963 with the buildings reverting to the army.

=== State ===
- Elder Park Hostel - Located at Elder Park, near the River Torrens. It consisted of numerous buildings that were formerly in use as the Schools Patriotic Fund Hostel (which had first opened in August 1941). Some of the English migrants who arrived under the South Australian Housing Trust's (SAHT) House Purchase Scheme were briefly accommodated here before selecting a house at Elizabeth, the SAHT-built satellite town. It was used for short-term residents (i.e., less than a fortnight) from circa 1949 to circa 1969 (when residents were transferred to Woodville Hostel) with the site being cleared in 1970 for use by the Festival Centre.
- Semaphore Hostel - Located in Sempahore, it opened in 1949 and was closed circa 1957.
- Woodville Hostel - Located in Woodville, it started as a munitions worker's hostel in 1941, then in August 1948, it was transferred to state control and remained in use until late 1977.

=== Shared control ===
- Gepps Cross Hostel - It was under commonwealth control from June 1951 to July 1952 then state (i.e., SAHT) control until 1964 when the site was cleared and houses built. It was located on the corner of Main North Road and Grand Junction Road, diagonally opposite from the Gepps Cross Hotel. It consisted of Nissen huts, each divided to accommodate two families.
- Milpara (Whyalla) Hostel - Located in Whyalla with funding split between the federal and state governments and BHP. It operated from October 1949 to circa 1952 (although the site may have been used otherwise until 1977).

=== Work hostels ===
- Bedford Park Hostel - Located in Bedford Park, it was operated by the Engineering and Water Supply Department.
- Hendon Hostel - Located in Hendon and operated by the Engineering and Water Supply Department.
- Islington Hostel - Located in Islington and operated by South Australian Railways.
- Leigh Creek Hostel - Located in Leigh Creek and operated by the Engineering and Water Supply Department.
- Mount Gambier Hostel - Located in Mount Gambier and operated by the Woods and Forests Department.
- Peterborough Hostel - Peterborough Hostel was established by South Australian Railways in about 1948 to house unmarried immigrant men who worked at the railway workshops. It was located on the edge of town, near the workshops. It consisted of Nissen huts and sheds and operated until the 1970s.
