= Gali Yalkarriwuy Gurruwiwi =

Australian Indigenous artist (1942–2020)

- Born: 1942; Milingimbi Island, Northern Territory, Australia
- Died: 2020 (aged 77–78)
- Other names: Kallie Yalkarriwuy
- Known for: Aboriginal art, Morning Star poles
- Spouse: Jane Garrutja
- Children: Trevor Barrarra Gurruwiwi
- Father: Gapuka

Gali Yalkarriwuy Gurruwiwi (1942–2020) was an internationally acclaimed Aboriginal Australian artist from Elcho Island (Galiwin'ku), an island off the coast of Northeast Arnhem Land. Gali was a Yolngu Mala leader and Gälpu clan representative, a clan group of the Dhuwa moiety, as well as a prominent member of the Galiwin'ku Uniting Church. He was best known for his Morning Star poles which have been featured in international exhibitions in London and the United States and for his unique melding of traditional Yolngu beliefs and Christian theology.

== Life ==
Gali Yalkarriwuy Gurruwiwi was born in 1942 (exact date is unknown) on Milingimbi Island where his family had been relocated during World War II. After the war ended, Gali and his family moved to the newly-established Methodist mission on Elcho Island. By Gali's own account, his father Gapuka was the last surviving clan member who possessed knowledge of the inner stories of the Morning Star or Banumbirr tradition. By the late 1950s, the Yolngu peoples settled on Elcho Island felt that their traditional culture was being dismissed by the Methodist missionaries, and, after much debate, some Yolngu leaders decided to share some of their sacred ceremonial objects and designs in order to demonstrate the coherence of their traditional belief system and its compatibility with Christian theology. Some years after this initial movement, Gapuka created a Morning Star pole without human bone or hair (rendering it incomplete and hence not sacred) and presented it as a gift to help the missionaries better understand Yolngu culture.

Beginning at a young age, Gali was taught the inner content carried by the Banumbirr by his father Gapuka. Growing up on a Methodist mission, Gali was also heavily exposed to the doctrines of Christianity, and regularly attended church. Like his father Gapuka and many other residents of the mission, Gali saw no incongruence between the Ancestral law and Christian stories, and viewed the two as complimentary. By his own account, Gali had a breakthrough moment as young boy upon learning that Jesus is likened to the morning star in the Bible, confirming the compatibility of Yolngu and Christian beliefs and the universality of the Banumbirr tradition.

He died in 2020.

== Career ==
Since inheriting the knowledge of the Banumbirr tradition from his father, Gali was a prolific producer of Morning Star poles which he sold and exhibited. As a Galpu clan leader, senior ritual specialist, and Morning Star Dancer, Gali held a particular authority within his community, responsible for teaching portions of the Morning Star tradition to his relatives and preserving the Yolngu culture.

In 2011, Gali was awarded the Wandjuk Marika 3D Memorial Award at the 28th National Aboriginal and Torres Strait Islander Art Awards. He was a finalist in these prestigious awards eight times (1995, 1998, 1999, 2000, 2001, 2008, 2009 and 2011). In 2015, Gali received national news coverage when he traveled 3000 kilometers to perform the traditional Lunggurrma dance with his granddaughter Sasha at her year 10 graduation. Gali's wife Jane Garrutju said her husband was "very strong in teaching his grandchildren to cling on to their values, to be able to balance Western culture and our culture." In recent years, Gali had created and exhibited Morning Star poles with his son Trevor Barrarra Gurruwiwi.

== Banumbirr (Morning Star Poles) ==
Banumbirr is the Yolngu name for the Morning Star, a subject that appears frequently in Yolngu art of the Dhuwa moiety. According to Yolngu tradition, an old woman conceals the Morning Star in a woven bag during daytime until dawn when the star travels across the sky above Arnhem land, announcing the coming of a new day. The bright light of Banumbirr guided the Djang'kawu Sisters, two ancestral beings who traveled east to west across Arnhem Land, bifurcating the cosmos. The spirits who are said to dance for the Morning Star sing songs that link together the clans who possess and control the knowledge of the Banumbirr tradition.

Morning Star poles are created to be used in ceremonial dances and rituals, constructed to move with motions of the performer and reflecting the broader ceremonial score. The Morning Star dance is frequently used in Yolngu funeral ceremonies to guide the spirit toward rest. The Galpu Morning Star poles which Gali created are composed of a long, slender wooden pole featuring clan designs painted in natural ochres. Bark fibre strings with feather tassels are affixed to the wooden pole and hang down, representing the various clans who are custodians of the Banumbirr tradition. The top of the pole is crowned with a tuft of feathers that represent the Morning Star itself. While traditional Banumbirr poles include human bone and hair, the poles that Gali created for exhibition and sale do not and, hence, are neither complete nor sacred.

Gali reconciled the image of the Morning Star pole with Christian theology by maintaining that the backbone of the pole points towards God while the feathers reflect the Star of David. Although Gali's personal faith in Christianity remained invisible in his Morning Star poles and his ritual dancing, Gali believed that God speaks through the sacred ancestral designs, and states that he feels the spiritual presence of Jesus when creating his Morning Star poles.

== Collections ==
- Art Gallery of New South Wales
- Hood Museum of Art, Dartmouth College
- Monash University Museum of Art
- Museum of Contemporary Art, Sydney
- Museum and Art Gallery of the Northern Territory
- National Gallery of Australia
- National Gallery of Victoria

== Significant exhibitions ==
- 1996-2003: The Native Born: Objects and Representations from Ramingining, Arnhem Land. Museum of Contemporary Art, Sydney, NSW, 24 April –21 August 1996; Sprengel Museum Hannover, Germany, 8 July–9 September 2001; Palacio de Velázquez, Madrid, Spain, 31 January–31 March 2002; Pinacoteca do Estado de São Paulo, Brazil, 30 June–11 August 2002; Asia Society Museum, New York, USA, 9 September 2002 – 5 January 2003; Museum of Contemporary Art, Taipei, Taiwan, 17 February–20 April 2003.
- 2009: Floating Life: Contemporary Aboriginal Fibre Art. Queensland Art Gallery, Brisbane, QLD, 1 August 2009 – 18 October 2009.
- 2012-2013: Crossing Cultures: The Owen and Wagner Collection of Contemporary Aboriginal Australian Art. Hood Museum of Art, Dartmouth College, Hanover, NH, 15 September 2012 – 10 March 2013; Toledo Museum of Art, Toledo, OH, 11 April – 14 July 2013.
