= The Diaries of Vaslav Nijinsky =

2001 film by Paul Cox

- Directed by: Paul Cox
- Written by: Paul Cox
- Narrated by: Derek Jacobi
- Release date: 2001
- Country: Australia
- Language: English
- Budget: $1.2 million
- Box office: A$39,996 (Australia)

The Diaries of Vaslav Nijinsky is a 2001 Australian film written, shot, directed and edited by Paul Cox about Vaslav Nijinsky, based on the premier danseur's published diaries.

Cox had the idea of making a film about Nijinsky for over 30 years ever since he heard Paul Scofield read extracts from Nijinksky's diaries on the radio. He used voiceover readings by Derek Jacobi combined with images related to the dancer's life. Several dancers from Leigh Warren & Dancers portrayed Nijinsky in different roles.
