= Leigh Warren =

Australian choreographer and opera director

Leigh Warren (born 1952) is an Australian contemporary dance choreographer and artistic director of Leigh Warren & Dancers (LWD) having previously been at the Australian Dance Theatre. He choreographed and directed the Portrait Trilogy of operas by Philip Glass (Akhnaten (2002), Einstein on the Beach (2006) and Satyagraha (2007)) performed by LWD, the Adelaide Vocal Project and the State Opera of South Australia.

== Training ==
Warren studied at Valrene Tweedie's Australian Academy of Ballet in Sydney and the Australian Ballet School. He was awarded an Australian Churchill Fellowship to study in 1974 at The Juilliard School in New York where he studied with Kazuko Hirabayashiu of the Martha Graham School.

== Career ==
Warren has danced with:

- the Australian Ballet (1970 to 1972 when he was promoted to soloist)
- Ballet Rambert in London (two periods)
- The Dance Company (NSW) now the Sydney Dance Company (1975)
- Nederlands Dans Theater as a dancer and contemporary dance teacher (two periods)
- Nureyev and Friends
- and as a freelance dancer (1984–1985).

He lectured at the Victorian College of the Arts before being appointed artistic director of the Australian Dance Theatre (1987–1992). He formed and has directed Leigh Warren & Dancers from 1992 to the present.

== Awards ==
- Australian Dance Award
  - 1999 for outstanding achievement in choreography for Shimmer.
- Adelaide Critics' Circle:
  - 2004 Individual Award for the direction and choreography of Einstein on the Beach
  - 2005 Award for Innovation for "Petroglyphs – Signs of Life", choreographed with Gina Rings
- 2014 Lifetime Achievement Award

== See also ==
- Dance Hub SA – formerly Leigh Warren and Dancers; includes much about Warren and his work.
