= Australian Dance Theatre =

Australian contemporary dance company

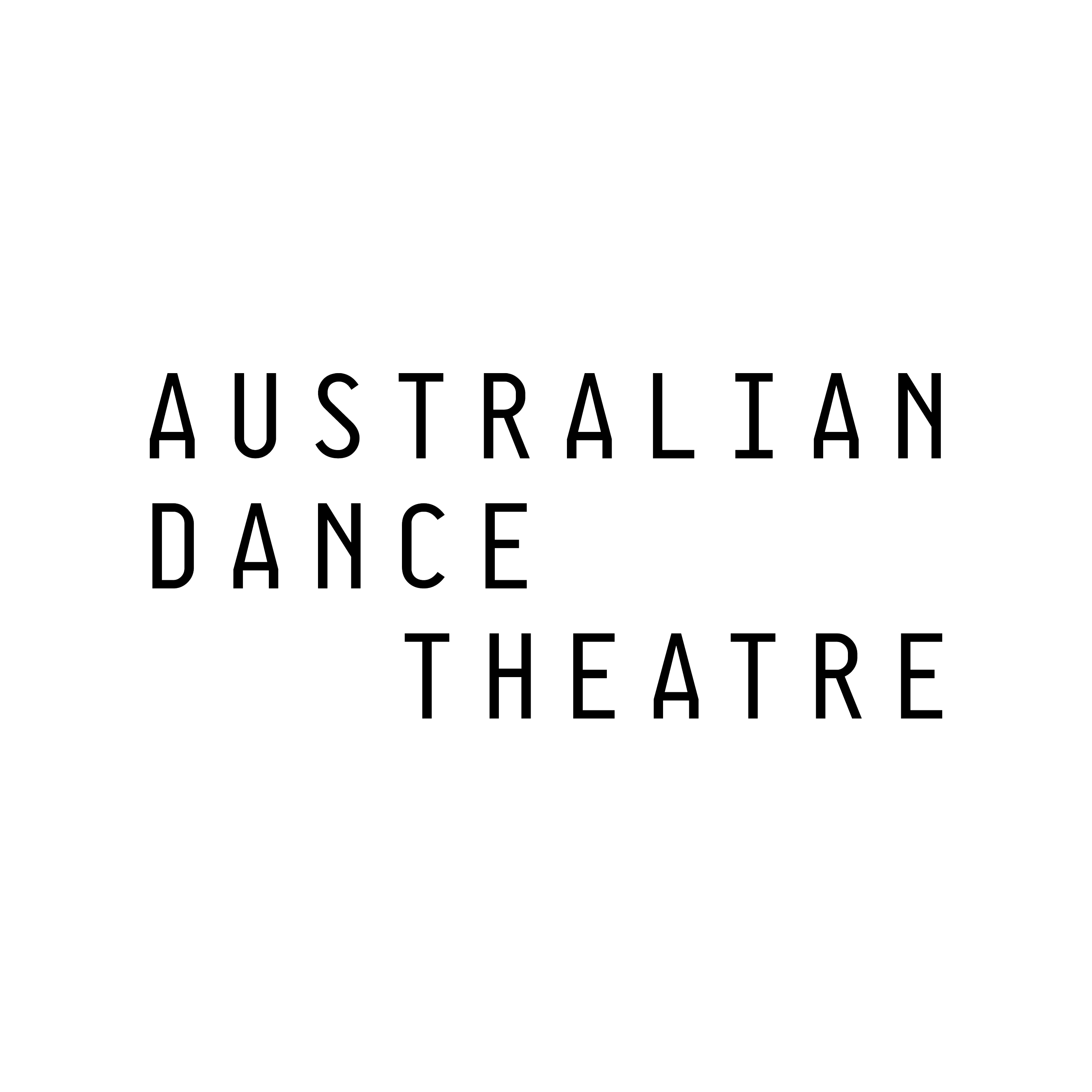

General information
- Name: Australian Dance Theatre
- Year founded: 1965
- Founding artistic director: Elizabeth Cameron Dalman OAM
- Principal venue: 57A Queen Street; Norwood, South Australia; South Australia; 5067; Australia; 34.9709°S 138.6083°E
- Website: www.adt.org.au

Artistic staff
- Artistic director: Daniel Riley; Brianna Kell (associate)

Australian Dance Theatre (ADT), known as Meryl Tankard Australian Dance Theatre from 1993 to 1999, is a contemporary dance company based in Adelaide, South Australia, established in 1965 by Elizabeth Cameron Dalman OAM. The ADT was the first modern dance company in Australia, and drew on the techniques of Martha Graham for its inspiration.

The company has garnered many industry awards, was the first Australian company invited to the Edinburgh Festival, and is the only Australian company to be invited to perform at Théâtre de la Ville in Paris. The company has toured performances extensively throughout Australia as well as internationally.

Since January 2022 the artistic director of the company is Daniel Riley, who took over after Garry Stewart had spent 22 years at the helm.

== History ==
=== 1965–1999 ===
The Australian Dance Theatre was founded by Elizabeth Dalman (later Elizabeth Cameron Dalman OAM) in 1965. Dalman sought to "open the horizons for provocative contemporary and cutting edge dance". The ADT was the first modern dance company in Australia, and drew on the techniques of Martha Graham for its inspiration. Eleo Pomare was an early collaborator and the songs of Peter, Paul and Mary featured strongly in their early works, such as "This Train".

Dalman remained artistic director until 1975, when the entire company was sacked after a funding dispute. Several directors followed, including Leigh Warren, who took the reins from 1987 to 1992/3.

Meryl Tankard, then head of her own small dance company in Canberra, was appointed as artistic director of ADT in 1992. The ADT at the time of her appointment had two studios in Gouger Street, and a budget of A$1.25 million. However, she was unhappy to learn that the Australia Council for the Arts had slashed the ADT's budget by 40% after she took up the post, allocating the money instead to Warren's company. After lobbying by the board, the South Australian Government only cut their funding by 10%. All of Tankard's dancers bar one joined her in Adelaide, while Warren's dancers did not audition for a place under her direction. From 1993 to 1999, the company was known as the Meryl Tankard Australian Dance Theatre. Tankard left after disputes with the board. After an interim directorship under Bill Pengelly, Garry Stewart was appointed in 1999.

=== 2000-2020 ===
Under artistic director Garry Stewart, Australian Dance Theatre developed a repertoire of contemporary dance productions that toured nationally and internationally. His first major work for the company, Birdbrain (2000), reinterpreted Swan Lake through contemporary dance, breakdance, gymnastics and multimedia. Subsequent productions included The Age of Unbeauty (2002), Devolution (2006), which incorporated robotic machines developed in collaboration with Canadian roboticist Louis-Philippe Demers, and G (2008), a reinterpretation of Giselle. In 2019, the company presented Anthology, featuring selections from six of Stewart's productions.

=== 2021-present ===
In May 2021 Convergence was performed at the ADT's home base, the Odeon Theatre, Norwood. Supported by the Tanja Liedtke Foundation, this series of short performances brought together the work of three winners of the International Choreographic Competition Hannover: Philippe Kratz (2018 winner, Germany); Oscar Buthelezi (2019 winner, South Africa); and Tu Hoang (2020 winner, Vietnam); of the newly formed South Australian First Nations Dance Collective (who danced to the music of Electric Fields); and of Barkandji woman Adrianne Semmens, a member of the SAFNDC and associate artist of ADT for 2021. Despite the COVID-19 pandemic, South Australia, being free of the virus at that time, was able to play to 100% capacity. The performance was well-reviewed.

Wiradjuri man Daniel Riley, who spent 12 years with Bangarra Dance Theatre, took over as artistic director at the end of 2021. Riley is the first Indigenous person to become an artistic director of a non-Indigenous dance company in Australia. Riley had met ADT founder Elizabeth Dalman when he was at school in Canberra, aged 13, although did not know about the ADT until they toured Canberra a few years later. He has since remained friends with Dalman and they talk often. Riley believes in an evolutionary rather than revolutionary approach, and is dedicated to creating shows that "can only be made here [on Kaurna country], not making work that looks like it's been made by a European company".

The new season and troupe, with four new dancers, were unveiled in March 2022. The first performance under Riley was Outside Within, a triptych of works that explores Aboriginal and post-colonial Australia, with the first of the three, Immerse, choreographed by Adrianne Semmens. This was followed by a short film made in 2021 featuring Riley and his son, called Mulumna-Within; and then Riley’s first dance work choreographed by him for the company, The Third (May 2022) In September 2022 Riley presented his first major work, at the Dunstan Playhouse in the Adelaide Festival Centre, called SAVAGE. The performance included nine dance students from Flinders University/AC Arts along with the ADT dancers. In January 2024, Brianna Kell, who had joined the company in 2022 and danced in several works since (including SAVAGE), as well as choreographing NOW/AGAIN as part of the company's CULTIVATE:ONE season, was appointed artistic associate of ADT. She remains in the role as of September 2026.

2025 is the 60th anniversary of ADT, and to celebrate the event, a collaborative work called A Quiet Language, with music by multi-instrumentalist, composer, music educator, and record producer Adam Page, is being premiered at the Adelaide Festival in February. Riley wants to capture some of the spirit and energy of the early days of the company, when events called "happenings" were held; parties where artists of all disciplines came together and experimented with creating new things. Founder Elizabeth Dalman, aged 90, helped to choreograph the work and train the dancers. Another major work, Two Blood, premieres at OzAsia Festival on 28 October 2025. It is co-created by Riley, theatre-maker S. Shakthidharan (Counting and Cracking) and Tagalaka dancer and choreographer Jasmin Sheppard. Music is by Singapore-based group SAtheCollective and Jaadwa composer James Howard, and the work includes video and text as well as dance.

== Governance and funding ==
The ADT is funded by the federal government through the Australia Council, the Government of South Australia through the Department of the Premier and Cabinet (1997–2018 via Arts South Australia) and a number of corporate partners and sponsors, as well as private donors.

=== Artistic directors ===
The artistic directors have been:

- 1965–1975: Elizabeth Cameron Dalman OAM
- 1977–1985: Jonathan Taylor (former dancer Ballet Rambert, UK)
- 1986–1987: Anthony Steel (former artistic director of Adelaide Festival) and Lenny Westerdijk (Dutch choreographer); interim appointment
- 1987–1993: Leigh Warren
- 1993–1999: Meryl Tankard
- 1999: Bill Pengelly (interim)
- 1999–2021: Garry Stewart
- 2022–present: Daniel Riley

== Tours ==
The company has toured extensively throughout Australia and internationally, including tours across Europe and the Americas. In October 2004, Australian Dance Theatre began a nine-and-a-half-week Europe tour covering 22 venues in Germany, the Netherlands, France, Belgium and Monaco, presenting Birdbrain and Held. A further tour was scheduled for January 2005, covering 24 venues across Europe, the United Kingdom and the United States.

== Accolades ==
In 1980, ADT's Wildstars opened the Edinburgh Festival, with the company becoming the first Australian arts group to appear at the festival.

== International Centre for Choreography ==
The International Centre for Choreography (ICC) at the ADT, supported by the Tanja Liedtke Foundation, was founded around 2016. It fosters choreographic initiatives locally and internationally, including residencies and other opportunities at ADT for the winners of the International Choreographic Competition Hannover (for which Garry Stewart has been on the judging panel). Its mission is "to facilitate open research and experimentation in a supportive and professional environment". Other initiatives of the ICC include dance workshops, discussion panels, collaborations, and screen dance projects.

== Selected performances ==
Choreographed by Dalman:

- Hallucinations (1966)
- This Train (1966)
- Landscape (1967)
- Sundown (1967)
- Sun and Moon (1968)
- Homage to Boticelli (1969)
- Creation (1969),
- Release of an Oath (1972)

Choreographed by Taylor:

- Wildstars
- Transfigured Night

Choreographed by Tankard:

- Songs with Mara
- Kikimora
- Furioso (1993)
- Aurora (1994)
- Possessed (1995)
- Rasa (1996), (in collaboration with Padma Menon)
- Seulle (1997)
- Inuk (1997).
- 1998 (sub-titled A Sampler by Meryl Tankard)

Choreographed by Pengelly:

- Split

Choreographed by Stewart:

- Split (August 1999)
- House Dance (New Year's Eve 1999), featuring six dancers abseiling down the outside of the Sydney Opera House
- Birdbrain (2000)
- The Age of Unbeauty (2002)
- Nothing (2004)
- Held (2004), a collaboration with U.S. dance photographer Lois Greenfield
- Devolution
- G (2008)
- Be Your Self (2010)
- Worldhood (2011), with the Adelaide Centre for the Arts
- Proximity (2012)
- Objekt (October 2016), with tanzmainz
- The Beginning of Nature (March 2016), with the Zephyr Quartet, performed at Womadelaide
- South (2019–2021), which reflected upon the treacherous journey undertaken by Sir Douglas Mawson and his team in the Antarctic in the summer of 1912–1913, and its relevance to climate change; winner of Outstanding Achievement in Choreography in 2019 at the Australian Dance Awards

Choreographed by Riley:

- The Third, the third piece in a trilogy called Outside Within, and Riley's first for the company
- SAVAGE (September 2022)
