= Hassell (architecture firm) =

Architecture firm

Practice information
- Firm type: Architecture, interior design, landscape architecture and planning
- Founders: Philip Claridge; Colin Hassell; Jack McConnell
- Founded: 1938 in Adelaide, South Australia

Significant works and honors
- Buildings: 120 Collins Street; Adelaide Festival Centre; Fiona Stanley Hospital; Sydney Olympic Park railway station; National Institute of Dramatic Art
- Projects: Sydney CBD and South East Light Rail

Website
- www.hassellstudio.com

Hassell is a multidisciplinary architecture, design and urban planning practice with offices in Australia, China, Singapore, USA and the United Kingdom. Founded in 1937/8 in Adelaide, South Australia, the firm's former names include Claridge, Hassell and McConnell; Hassell, McConnell and Partners; and Hassell and Partners Pty. Ltd.

They are particularly known for the Adelaide Festival Centre complex, which opened in 1973.

== History ==
Hassell was founded in Adelaide, South Australia in 1938.

From 1937, Colin Hassell worked with Philip R. Claridge and Associates, with Claridge, Hassell and McConnell being established as a partnership which included Jack McConnell. Hassell served in the Australian Army during the Second World War, resuming his place in the firm in 1945. After Claridge retired in 1949, the firm became Hassell, McConnell and Partners, and established offices in Melbourne and Canberra. In 1962 John Morphett joined the practice, who was very influenced by the Bauhaus and modernist movements. In the 1970s the firm became Hassell and Partners Pty. Ltd., with Hassell as Senior Principal and also Managing Director of the group. During this period, additional offices were opened in Sydney, Melbourne and Perth.

Hassell and Partners Pty Ltd designed the Adelaide Festival Centre in 1970, with the Adelaide Festival Theatre opened in 1973. Said to be designed "from the inside out" by chief designer John Morphett, the complex has been "hailed as a major step forward in modern architecture in South Australia".

After 1978, the firm became simply Hassell.

In 2010 the firm was ranked the largest architecture company in Australia and the 25th largest in the world, and retained the Australian ranking for the following two years in the BD World Architecture 100 annual survey.

In 2019, Hassell, then the second-largest design firm in Australia, announced that they would be closing their Adelaide office upon completion of existing projects in 2021, so it could focus on larger urban centres. The existing projects included the Adelaide GPO development, the Adelaide Festival Centre redevelopments, and the expansion of Adelaide Airport terminal. Although the physical office closed, the firm continued to undertake work in Adelaide, via a consultancy which set up by the three principal architects based in Adelaide.

== Accolades ==
The firm has received Australian Institute of Architects national awards for the Sydney Olympic Park railway station (1998), the VS1/SA Water building in Adelaide (2009), ANZ Centre in Melbourne's Docklands, the railway stations of the Epping to Chatswood railway line (2010), and the Australian National University Birch Building Refurbishment (2022).

In 2008, the Hawke Building at the University of South Australia's City West campus, which Hassell designed in collaboration with Wardle, won the RAIA's national award, the Sir Zelman Cowen Award for Public Architecture, as well as the RAIA SA Jack McConnell Award of Merit for Public Architecture and Award of Merit for Interior Architecture.

In 2023, the firm won a Civic Trust Award for the First Light Pavilion Visitor's Centre at Jodrell Bank Observatory.

== Selected projects ==
The firm's first major project was the Art Deco building at 2 King William Street for the Bank of New South Wales.

=== Australia ===
- Adelaide Festival Centre, Adelaide, Australia, 1973
- Olympic Park railway station, Sydney, Australia, 1998
- Hawke Building, UniSA, Adelaide, 2007
- North Ryde railway station, North Ryde, Australia, 2009
- ANZ Centre, Docklands, Australia, 2010
- Fiona Stanley Hospital, Perth, Australia 2013
- National Institute of Dramatic Art Graduate School, Sydney, Australia, 2015
- Perth Stadium, Perth, Australia, 2017
- Western Australian Museum (WA Museum Boola Bardip), Perth, Australia, 2019, Designed with OMA
- UWA EZONE Student Hub, Perth, Australia, 2020
- AMRF First Building (as part of the Aerotropolis Masterplan for Western Sydney Airport), Sydney, In progress
- Melbourne Arts Precinct Transformation, Melbourne, In progress

=== United Kingdom ===
- Sky UK London HQ (Sky Central Workplace), London, 2016
- Brighton Business School, Brighton, 2021
- First Light Pavilion Visitor's Centre (Jodrell Bank Observatory), Macclesfield, 2022

=== China ===
- HSBC QRC Suites, Hong Kong, 2021

== Gallery ==
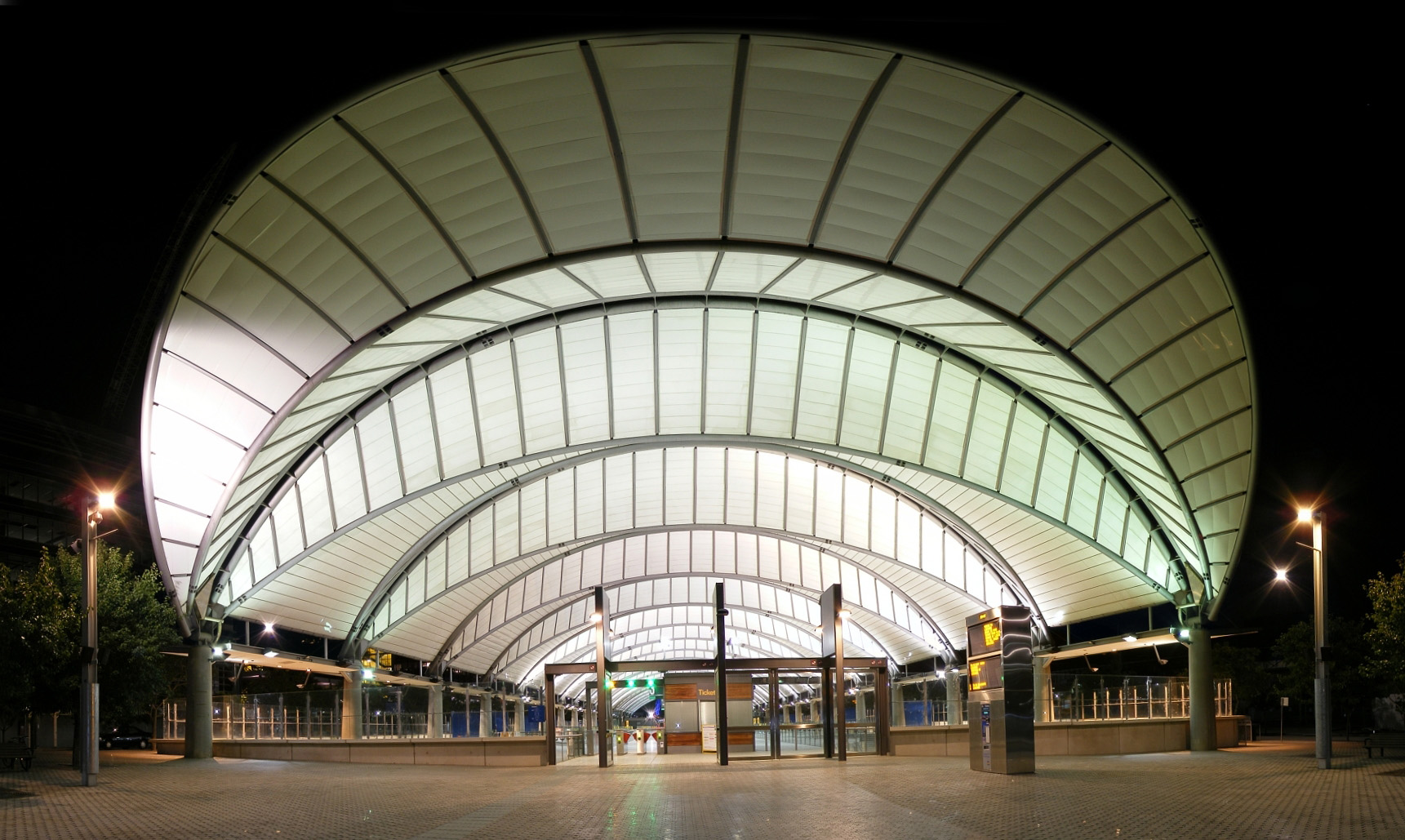
Olympic Park railway station, Sydney, Australia

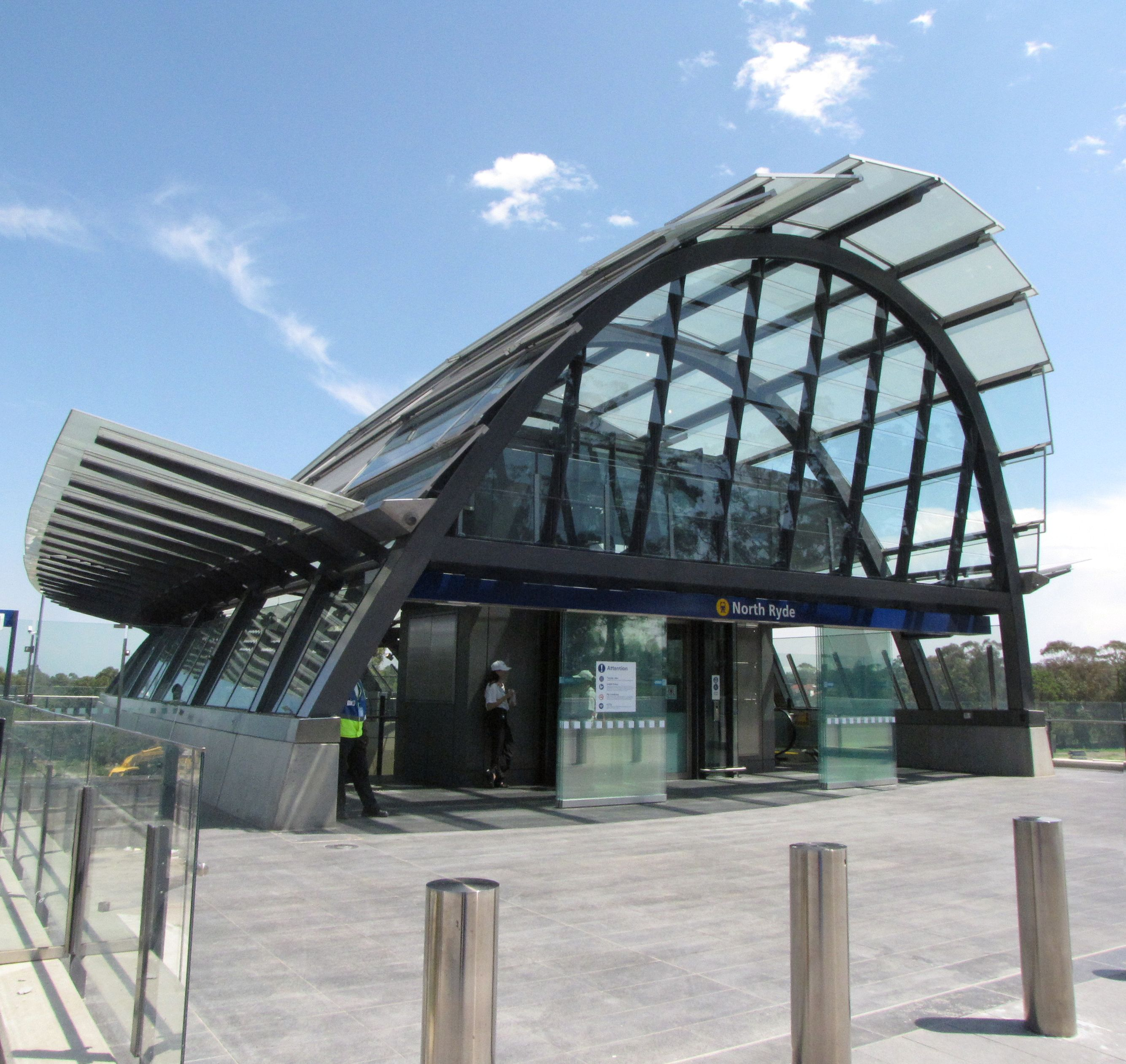
North Ryde railway station, Sydney, Australia

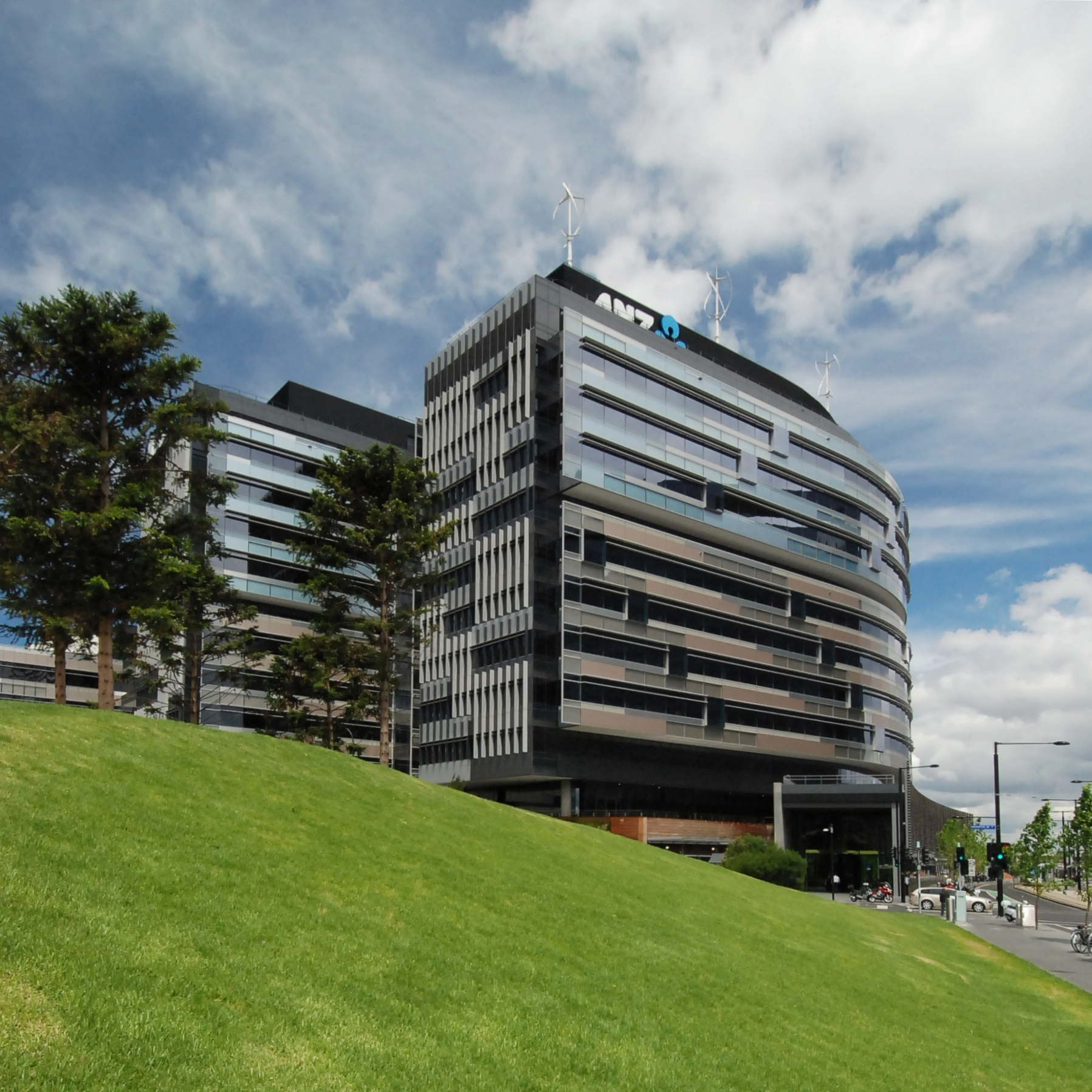
ANZ Centre, Docklands, Australia

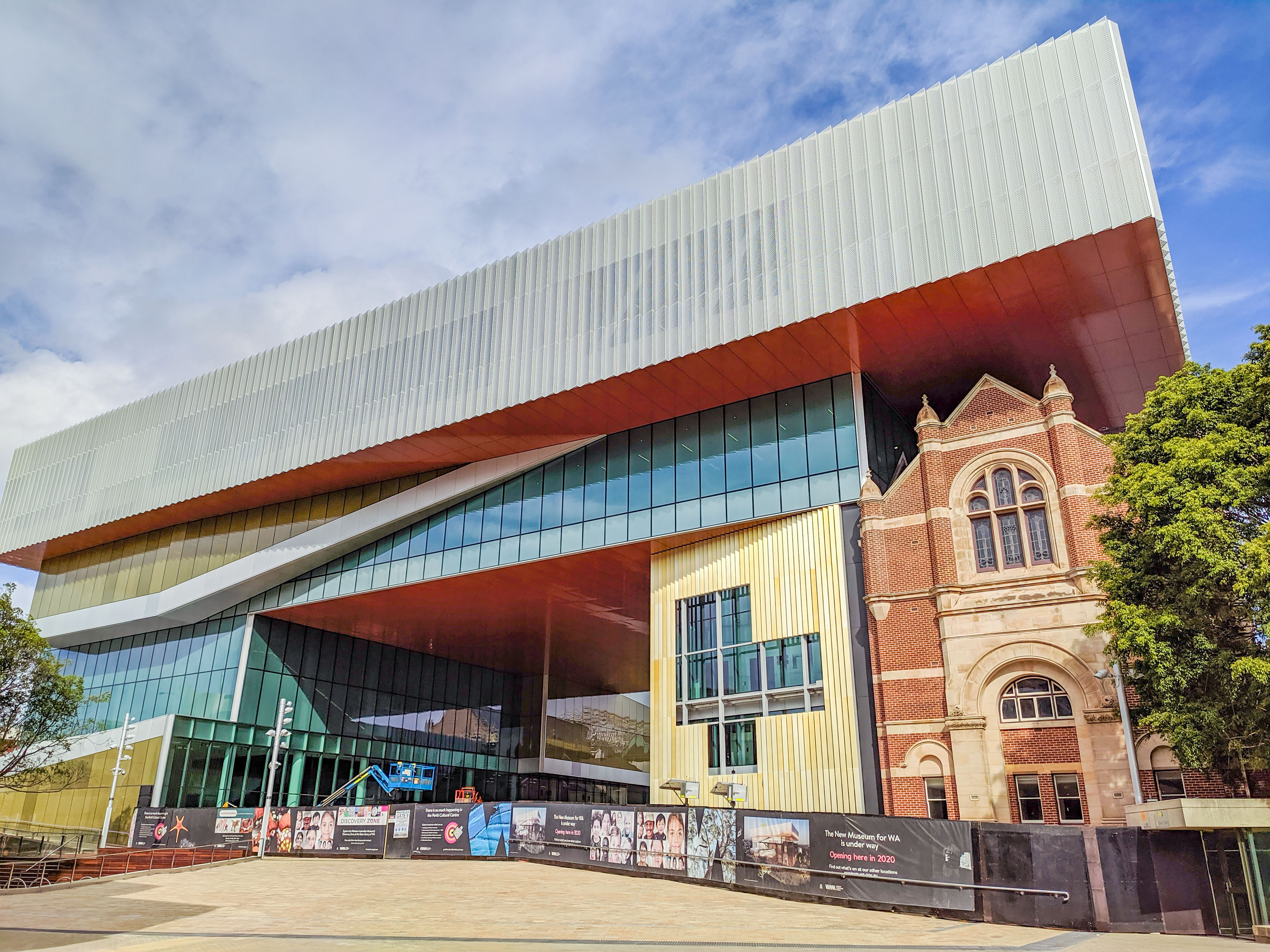
Western Australian Museum (WA Museum Boola Bardip), Perth, Australia

== See also ==
- Architecture of Australia
