= Lois Greenfield =

American photographer (born 1949)

- Born: April 18, 1949 (age 77)
- Occupation: Photographer
- Website: www.loisgreenfield.com

Lois Greenfield (born April 18, 1949) is an American photographer best known for her unique approach to photographing the human form in motion. Born in New York City, she attended Hunter College Elementary School, the Fieldston School, and Brandeis University. Greenfield majored in Anthropology and expected to become an ethnographic filmmaker but instead, she became a photojournalist for local Boston newspapers. She traveled around the world on various assignments as a photojournalist but her career path changed in the mid-1970s when she was assigned to shoot a dress rehearsal for a dance concert. Greenfield has since specialized in photographing dancers in her photo studio as part of her exploration of the expressive potential of movement.

She has created images for the world's most well known dance companies such as Alvin Ailey, Martha Graham, Merce Cunningham, Paul Taylor, Bill T. Jones/Arnie Zane Dance Company, and American Ballet Theatre. Her work has been published in numerous periodicals, and has been exhibited in museums and galleries around the world. Based in New York City, she gives workshops and lectures in schools around the world.

== Beginning of career ==
In the mid-1970s, Greenfield began what would become a twenty-year relationship with The Village Voice photographing dance companies reviewed by dance critic Deborah Jowitt for her weekly column. This led to assignments from newspapers and magazines around the world. Around this time she had the opportunity to interview and write about many photographers whom she admired. Among her subjects were Jacques Henri Lartigue, André Kertész, Duane Michals, and Barbara Morgan, who along with photographer Max Waldman were her biggest inspirations.

=== Rehearsal to Studio ===
By the late 70's, she became dissatisfied with a documentary approach to dance photography, which she considered to be merely capturing someone else's art form. This led Greenfield to discover what would become her own visual syntax.

In 1980, she set up a studio where she invited her subjects to improvise, and together they explored high–risk and non-repeatable moments that could only be seen as a photograph. She created moments expressly for the camera, exploiting photography's ability to slice time into 1/2000 of a second, revealing to the viewer what the naked eye can't see. Greenfield describes her use of the medium format Hasselblad camera and how it influenced her:

In my early work, I used the black frame (the negative's actual border), to interact dramatically with my subjects. Their improvisations play off the frame as though it were a real container. The frame often confines or radically crops them to imply entrances, exits and off-screen space.

— Lois Greenfield

Greenfield developed a radical way of photographing movement. Her dancers appear weightless, freed from the constraints of gravity and locked together in seemingly impossible configurations. The more incomprehensible the picture looked, the more successful it was in Greenfield's eyes: "What intrigues me is making images that confound and confuse the viewer, but that the viewer knows, or suspects, really happened [...] I can't depict the moments before or after the camera's click, but I invite the viewer's consideration of that question."

Since these early experiments, her photographic method has stayed pretty much the same - shooting just one moment out of a phrase of movement, and never digitally compositing the dancers' positions in the frame. All her photographs are literal documents, taken as single in-camera images. According to Samantha Clark, "The most interesting moments are the ambiguous ones when you really don't know what is happening or why. The buoyant images in Greenfield's art might have even fooled Galileo, Newton and Einstein."

== Commercial ==
Commercial clients picked up on the metaphoric nature of Greenfield's imagery, and commissioned her to create campaigns. Her photos and videos have been featured in campaigns for Sony, Disney, Rolex, Hanes, Pepsi, Johnson & Johnson, Epson, and Kodak, among others. Her most recognized commercial assignment was the series of advertisements she created for Raymond Weil watches in 1993, which appeared on billboards and ads worldwide. Greenfield has also directed numerous videos and TV commercials.

== Collaborations ==
Since the mid-1990s, Greenfield has been fascinated by non-traditional forms of photographic presentation. Invited to participate in "Le Printemps de Cahors" in France in 1994, she projected her images onto a 30-foot high water screen in the Lot River.

She pioneered the use of live photography as an integral part of a dance performance. Greenfield collaborated from 2003 to 2007 with the Australian Dance Theatre on HELD, a dance inspired by her photography. Greenfield was onstage shooting the live action, and her images were projected on the stage in real-time. The dance and its representation appeared virtually simultaneously as part of the performance. The dance was performed at the Sydney Opera House, Sadler's Wells in London, the Joyce Theater in NYC and Theatre de la Ville, Paris.

=== Artist-In-Residence ===
- 2014 – NYU / Tisch Department of Dance and New Media
- 2012 – Syracuse University

== Selected Exhibits (1983-2019) ==
Exbibits include:

- The International Center of Photography, NYC
- French Foundation of Photography, France
- Musee de L'Elysee, Lausanne, Switzerland
- The Tel Aviv Art Museum, Israel
- The Erarta Contemporary Museum, St. Petersburg, Russia
- The Venice Biennale, Italy
- Mikimoto Gallery, Tokyo, Japan
- Nordic Light Festival, Norway
- Jacob's Pillow Festival, US
- Pingyao Festival, China
- Melbourne Arts Festival, Australia
- The New Zealand Festival of Arts
- Bienal de Danza de Cali, Colombia
- Urban Art Festival, Shenzhen, China

== Collections ==
- The International Center of Photography
- Musee de L'Elysée, Lausanne, Switzerland
- New York Library for the Performing Arts
- Harvard Art Museums, Boston, MA
- Walker Art Center, Minneapolis, MN
- Cooper Hewitt, Smithsonian Design Museum
- Bard College, Annandale-on-Hudson
- Bibliothèque nationale de France, Paris, France
- The National Museum of Dance, Saratoga Springs, NY
- Solari Foundation Photography Collection, Tempe, AZ
- The Southeast Museum of Photography, Daytona Beach, FL
- Center for Creative Arts, St. Louis, MO
- Lafayette College, Easton, PA
- The Avon Collection, NYC

== Awards and honors ==
- 2018 – Artist Inspiration Awakening Award – Rubans Rouges Dance
- 2016 – Lifetime Achievement Award – McCallum Theatre Institute
- 2015 – Dance in Focus Award – The Film Society of Lincoln Center and Dance Films Association
- 2005 – Dance Theater Workshop/Live Arts NYC
- AWARDS - Hasselblad, Graphis, Creativity, The One Club

== Books ==
- Breaking Bounds: The Dance Photography of Lois Greenfield, 1992, Text by William A. Ewing (Thames & Hudson Ltd. UK & France; Chronicle Books USA; JICC, Japan). ISBN 978-0-8118-0232-1
- Airborne: The New Dance Photography of Lois Greenfield, 1998, Text by William A. Ewing (Thames & Hudson Ltd. UK; Chronicle Books USA). ISBN 0-8118-2155-2
- Lois Greenfield: Moving Still, 2015, Text by William A. Ewing (Thames & Hudson Ltd. UK; Chronicle Books USA). ISBN 978-1452150208
