= Tanja Liedtke Foundation =

The Tanja Liedtke Foundation (German: Tanja Liedtke Stiftung) is a German-based charity supporting modern and contemporary dance.

== History ==
The foundation was established in July 2008 in honour of the dancer and choreographer, Tanja Liedtke who was killed in a car accident in Sydney, Australia in August 2007, two months after starting as artistic director of the Sydney Dance Company.

== Description ==
The Foundation's purpose is "to support the enrichment and advancement of contemporary dance theatre, and the development of Australian/European artistic connections."

The Tanja Liedtke Foundation is registered as a tax-privileged organisation in Stuttgart, Germany as Tanja Liedtke Stiftung accordance with German law.

The Tanja Liedtke Gift Fund was established in Australia in 2008 as a sub-fund of the Perpetual Foundation Gift Fund. The Tanja Liedtke Gift Fund reflects the vision, aims and priorities of the Tanja Liedtke Foundation.

== Fellowship ==
The inaugural Tanja Liedtke Fellowship was offered, in partnership with Radialsystem V – New Space for the Arts (Berlin) and the contemporary dance company Sasha Waltz & Guests (Berlin), to an Australian dancer/choreographer, Antony Hamilton.

The 2011 Tanja Liedtke Fellowship was awarded to Katarzyna Sitarz, a Polish dancer/choreographer with a broad international experience in Poland, the Netherlands, Lithuania and Germany. She will direct her creative residency at Arts House Melbourne in March 2011 and participate in the development of a new collaboration by Australian choreographer Lucy Guerin.

== International Choreographic Competition Hannover ==
The Foundation has collaborated for several years with the International Choreographic Competition Hannover at Staatstheater Hannover, in 2021 introducing a new production award at the competition.
