= Adelaide College of the Arts =

Art school in Adelaide, Australia

Coordinates: 34°55′28″S 138°35′31″E

Adelaide College for the Arts
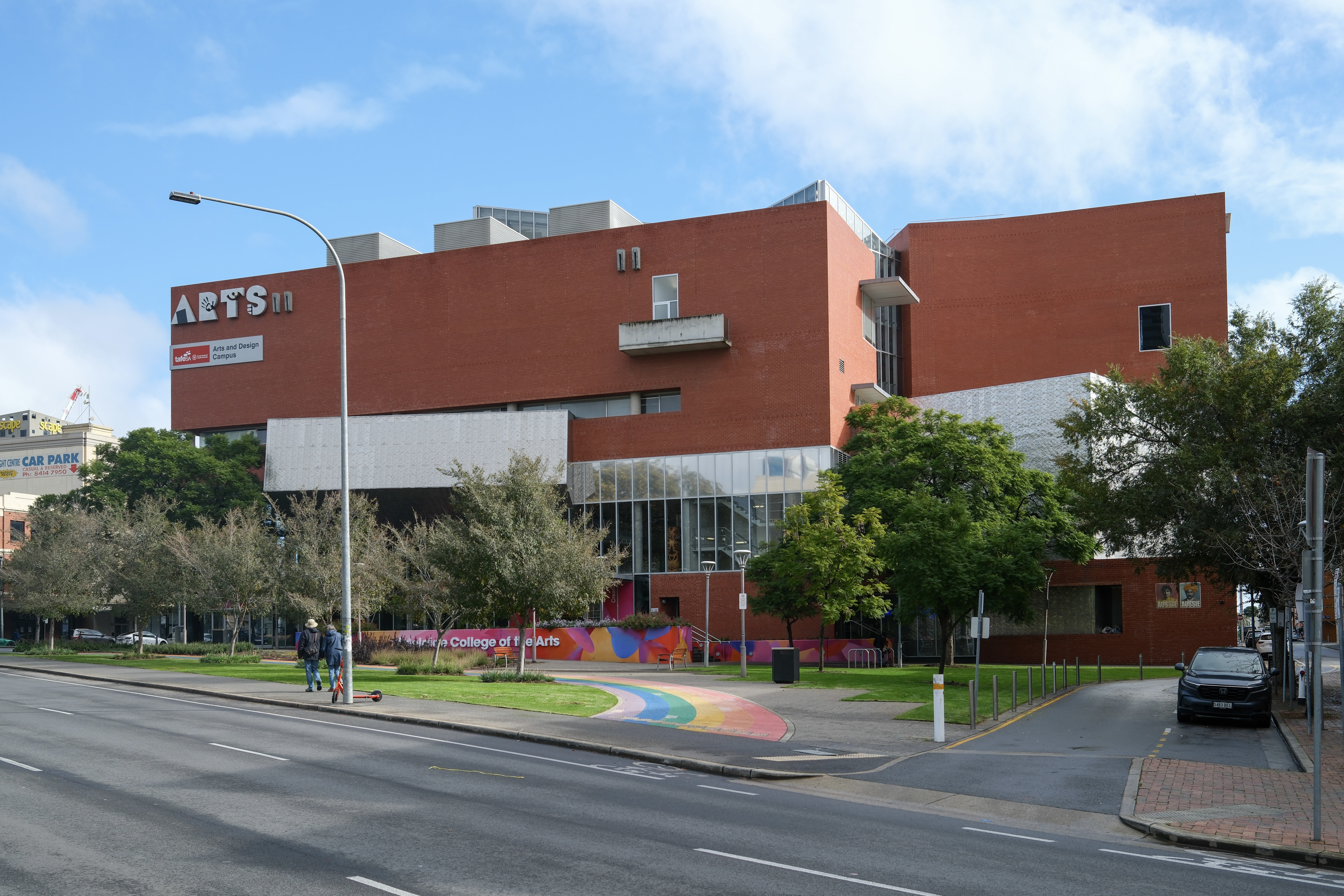
- The college in 2026
- Established: 2001
- Location: Light Square, Adelaide, South Australia
- Website: www.tafesa.edu.au/adelaide-college-of-the-arts

The Adelaide College of the Arts, also known as AC Arts and formerly known as Adelaide Centre for the Arts, is a campus of TAFE SA that specialises in education for the performing arts, visual arts, and filmmaking. It is located on Light Square, Adelaide, South Australia. Its predecessors were the Centre for the Performing Arts (CPA) and the North Adelaide School of Arts (NASA).

== History ==
The predecessors of the Adelaide College of the Arts were:

- Centre for the Performing Arts (CPA)
- North Adelaide School of Arts (NASA)

=== Centre for the Performing Arts ===
The Centre for the Performing Arts (CPA) was established in 1978 on the site of the old Adelaide Girls High School, in Grote Street.

Set up by Barry Young, it initially offered courses in dance and technical production. An acting course was introduced in 1987, headed by David Kendall, (Note: Father of actress Kate Kendall.) supported by two part-time instructors. Twelve students enrolled. The course was later expanded from one to two years, and later to three. In 1997 an introductory acting course was established, called Prologue. All lecturers were in the industry, and had useful industry contacts. As the centre expanded, transportable buildings were brought in to create more studio space.

=== North Adelaide School of Arts ===
The North Adelaide School of Art (NASA) was established in 1979 in Stanley Street, North Adelaide, on a site vacated the previous year by the South Australian School of Art. The building was purpose-built as an art school in the late 1950s and opened in 1963.

NASA was dedicated to practical studio-based studies in visual art, providing training in studio areas, such as photography and digital art, ceramics, sculpture, painting, drawing, printmaking, jewellery, and textiles.

Rowley Richardson was principal of the school, which underwent a major renovation in 1984-85, and closed in 2000.

=== New centre ===
In 2001, a new purpose-built centre, encompassing both visual arts and performing arts, was built to replace the two former colleges, the new complex being named the Adelaide Centre for the Arts.

== Building ==
AC Arts' purpose-built $30 million campus was designed by award-winning architect Adrian Evans during his time with the Adelaide-based firm Hassell.

=== Theatres ===
AC Arts has two main theatre spaces. These are used for in-house performances and also for professional productions, especially during the Adelaide Fringe and the Adelaide Festival.

The Main Theatre is a proscenium arch theatre that seats 220 and the X Space experimental theatre that seats 110. Both spaces are industry-standard, allowing students to learn in an environment as close as possible to the professional world.

=== Acting and dance studios ===
On the third floor of the building there are four dance studios with mirrors and bars, four acting studios and a music room. Two of the acting studios (The Stables and the David Kendall Studio) double as performance spaces with easy black out ability.

== Courses and teachers ==
All staff either continue to work or have worked in the industry, and both local and international theatre directors assist with the student productions.

Identified major study areas of the centre are:

- Performing arts (acting and dance)
- Visual arts
- Music performance and sound production
- Graphic design
- Photography
- Film and television production
- CGI and game art
- Technical production

The Advanced Diploma of Arts (Acting) is an actor-training program that covers four broad disciplines: acting; movement and voice; performance/production; and contextual studies, and takes three years of full-time study to complete. As of 2016, the head of acting was Terence Crawford.

== Notable alumni ==
=== Artists ===
Well-known artists who studied at NASA include:

- Silvio Apponyi
- David Bromley
- Zhong Chen
- Aldo Iacobelli
- Bronwyn Platten

=== Performers ===
Actors who studied at CPA and the current college include:

- Kate Kendall, actor, best known for her long-running role as "Angie Piper" in the television series Stingers
- Nathan Page, actor
- Nathan O'Keefe, actor, a regular performer with both State Theatre Company of South Australia and Windmill Theatre (graduated 2003)

=== Others ===
- Michael James Rowland, graphic designer and filmmaker
