= Adelaide Festival Centre =

Theatre and entertainment precinct

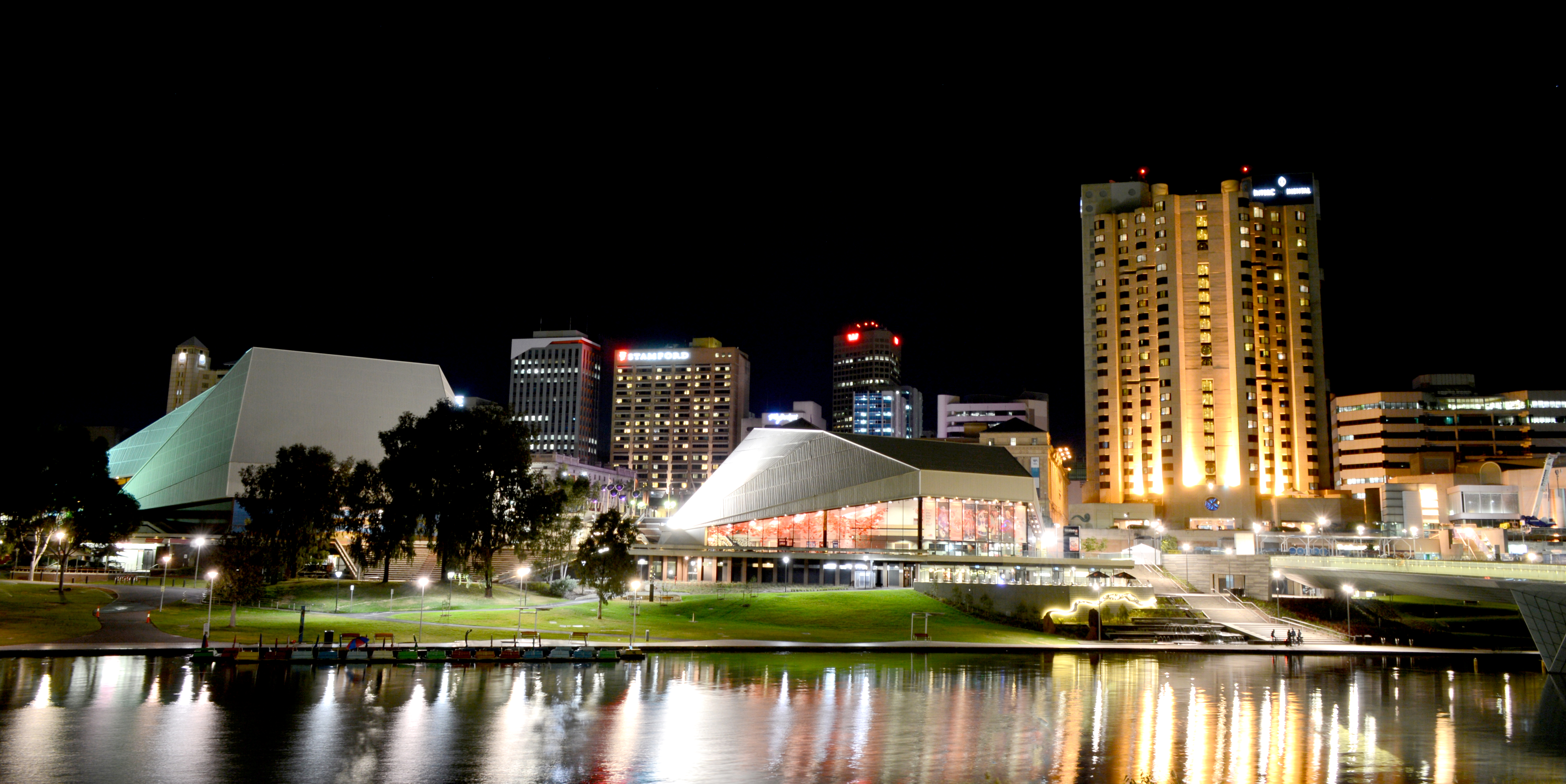
- Adelaide Festival Centre at night with the River Torrens in the foreground
- Interactive map of Adelaide Festival Centre
- Address: King William Road; Adelaide, South Australia
- Coordinates: 34°55′10″S 138°35′52″E
- Owner: Adelaide Festival Centre Trust
- Capacity: Festival Theatre: 2,000; Dunstan Playhouse: 590; Space Theatre: 350; Her Majesty's Theatre: 1,467
- Type: Performing arts centre

Construction
- Opened: 2 June 1973
- Architect: Hassell

Website
- www.adelaidefestivalcentre.com.au

Adelaide Festival Centre, Australia's first capital city multi-purpose arts centre and the home of South Australia's performing arts, was built in the early 1970s and designed by Hassell Architects. The Festival Theatre opened in June 1973 with the rest of the centre and the Festival Plaza following soon after.

Located approximately 50 metres (160 ft) north of the corner of North Terrace and King William Road, it is distinguished by its two white geometric dome roofs, and lies on a 45-degree angle to the city's grid. The complex includes Festival Theatre, Dunstan Playhouse (formerly The Playhouse and Optima Playhouse), Space Theatre (formerly The Space) and several gallery and function spaces. The centre was erected on land between Elder Park and Parliament House, and several historic buildings were demolished to make way for the new project.

The Festival Centre is managed by a statutory corporation, the Adelaide Festival Centre Trust, which is responsible for encouraging and facilitating artistic, cultural and performing arts activities, as well as maintaining and improving the building and facilities of the complex and Her Majesty's Theatre. The centre hosts Adelaide Festival and presents numerous major festivals across the year.

Extensive redevelopment of the external spaces began in 2016, but the theatre spaces remained open. The car park and plaza area, along with a tall office building known as Festival Tower, were completed by 2024. Construction of Festival Tower Two began in early 2026. Overall redevelopment of the external spaces is expected to be completed in 2028. The theatres and internal spaces underwent extensive upgrading and refurbishment in late 2025, reopening in time for the Adelaide Festival at the end of February 2026.

== Development ==
=== Planning and design ===
In the 1960s, the Adelaide Festival of the Arts started to outgrow the city's existing venues, and there was a push to build a "Festival Hall". The Adelaide Festival Theatre Act 1964 provided for the erection of the Festival Theatre building. The originally proposed site was the Carclew building in North Adelaide, which had been purchased from the Bonython family by the Adelaide City Council for the purposes of building a Festival Hall.

Liberal state Premier Steele Hall lobbied the federal government for tax concessions for a public appeal for the Festival Hall, which was initially unsuccessful, until Prime Minister John Gorton offered Hall either tax concessions or A$100,000. Hall accepted the money. While on a trip to London, Steele Hall visited the Royal Festival Hall on the banks of the River Thames and decided that the banks of the River Torrens was the ideal choice for the site of the Adelaide Festival of the Arts and the cultural heart of the city. During this time, the state government changed hands, but the drive for a new centre continued with fervour. When Don Dunstan became Premier he expanded the idea into a "Festival Centre", incorporating multiple smaller venues.

The Lord Mayor of Adelaide, Robert Porter, supported by Dunstan, launched a public appeal to raise funds to build the Festival Centre and establish Adelaide as a significant city in the art world. The appeal raised its target within a week, and was soon over-subscribed; the surplus was set aside to create a collection of artworks to grace the new building.

The building was designed by Hassell, McConnell and Partners for the Adelaide City Council and the Adelaide Festival Centre Trust, and has been "hailed as a major step forward in modern architecture in South Australia". It was designed "from the inside out" and is particularly associated with the architect John Morphett AM OBE and Colin Hassell. Prior to designing the buildings, Hassell led a team which included Morphett to the United States and Europe to undertake a study of theatre designs. In 2023, the building won the Jack Cheesman Award for Enduring Architecture at the Australian Institute of Architects SA Chapter awards.

=== Construction ===
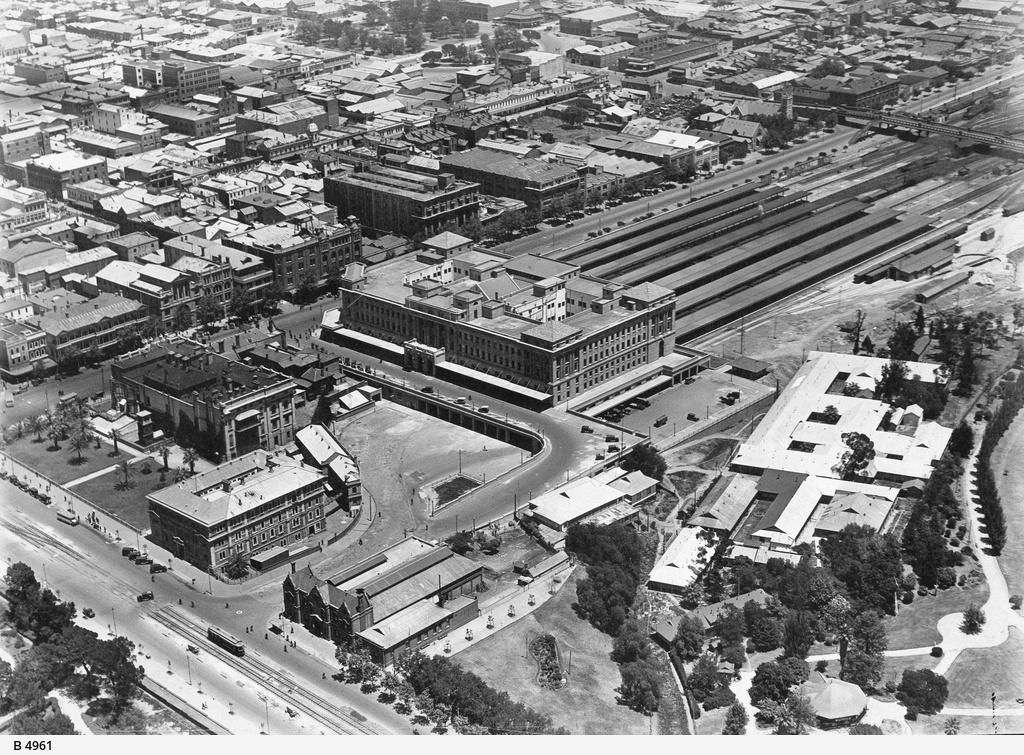
The future Festival Plaza area as seen in 1928.

The Adelaide City Baths, which had stood on the site since their creation in 1861 were demolished in 1969 to make way for the new centre and plaza. Similarly, the Government Printing Office building, which was built circa 1880 between the baths and Parliament House, and later expanded, was also vacated and demolished. The site also housed the Elder Park Hostel, which consisted of numerous repurposed buildings near the river. It was in use from circa 1949 to circa 1969 with the site being cleared in 1970. More recently, acknowledgement has also been made that the site is located on historical Kaurna lands.

Adelaide Festival Centre was built in three parts, from April 1970 to 1980. The main building, the Festival Theatre, was completed in 1973, within its budget of A$10 million. On 2 June 1973, Festival Theatre was officially opened by Prime Minister Gough Whitlam at a gala performance of Act Two, Scene 1 of Beethoven's opera Fidelio and Choral Symphony. The construction of the Playhouse (now Dunstan Playhouse), Space Theatre, and Amphitheatre followed. The whole complex was completed for A$21 million (By comparison, the Sydney Opera House, completed in 1973, cost A$102 million.). The Festival Plaza, initially known as the Southern Plaza, was completed on 22 March 1977.

=== Outdoor areas ===
South of complex, in the Festival Plaza, an environmental sculpture was created by West German artist Otto Hajek, which he called Adelaide Urban Iconography. (Note: In the Festival Centre archives it is variously named Shorthand Adelaide, City Iconograph, and City Iconography, and government records give the title City Sign Sculpture Garden.) It has also been referred to as "Hajek's Plaza", and was believed to be the largest artwork in Australia.

Other sculptures graced the outdoor spaces, including the prominent stainless steel Tetrahedra, also known as Environmental Sculpture and Tetrahedrons, by Bert Flugelman.

After its opening in 1977, the plaza stirred debate and opinions were mixed, but its designs were seen to "consciously exemplify the new practices and relations embodied in the concept of environmental art". Designed in a brutalist style, it was labelled as empty and ugly by some, but was nonetheless an artwork of its times. In 1977, it was awarded a "brickbat" by the Civic Trust, but Australia Post honoured the sculpture in 1986 by issuing a commemorative stamp for South Australia's sesquicentenary. Hajek's wife, artist and poet Katja Hajek, wrote in 2001 that the plaza "is well-known in the world of art and became acknowledged as an artistically outstanding creation of the last quarter of the 20th century".

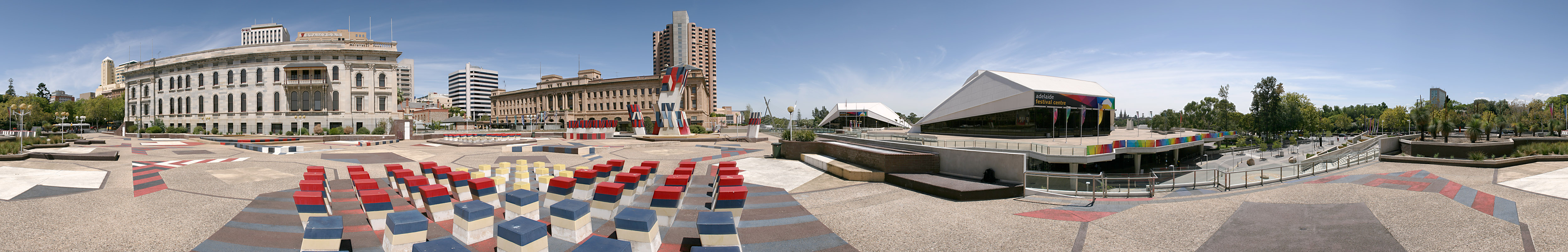
360-degree panoramic view of the Southern Plaza of the Festival Theatre Centre in 2007 (foreground demolished since photo). (From left-to-right, starting SE): Background: (SE): Government House, The Myer Centre, (S): Parliament House, Dame Roma Mitchell Building (SW): Adelaide railway station/Casino/Hyatt Hotel Foreground: (SE): Southern Plaza, (S-to-W) City Sign Background:(W-to-N): Adelaide Festival Centre: The Dunstan Playhouse, The Space Theatre, The outdoor amphitheatre, The Festival Theatre Foreground:(W-to-N): Southern Plaza Background:(N-to-NE): The Festival Theatre (northern) Plaza, (NE-to-E): Trees along King William Road Foreground:(N-to-E): Stairs from Southern Plaza down to Festival Theatre Plaza, and Southern Plaza.

=== Redevelopment ===
==== Exterior ====
In the decades following the plaza's opening, its painted surfaces, fountains and vegetation were not well-maintained, there were some problems with its concrete decking, it was not used for events, and, crucially, it did not attract incidental foot traffic to interact with its forms. In 1987, the fountain, unused for the prior three years owing to a leak, was demolished as part of a A$11 million upgrade of the plaza.

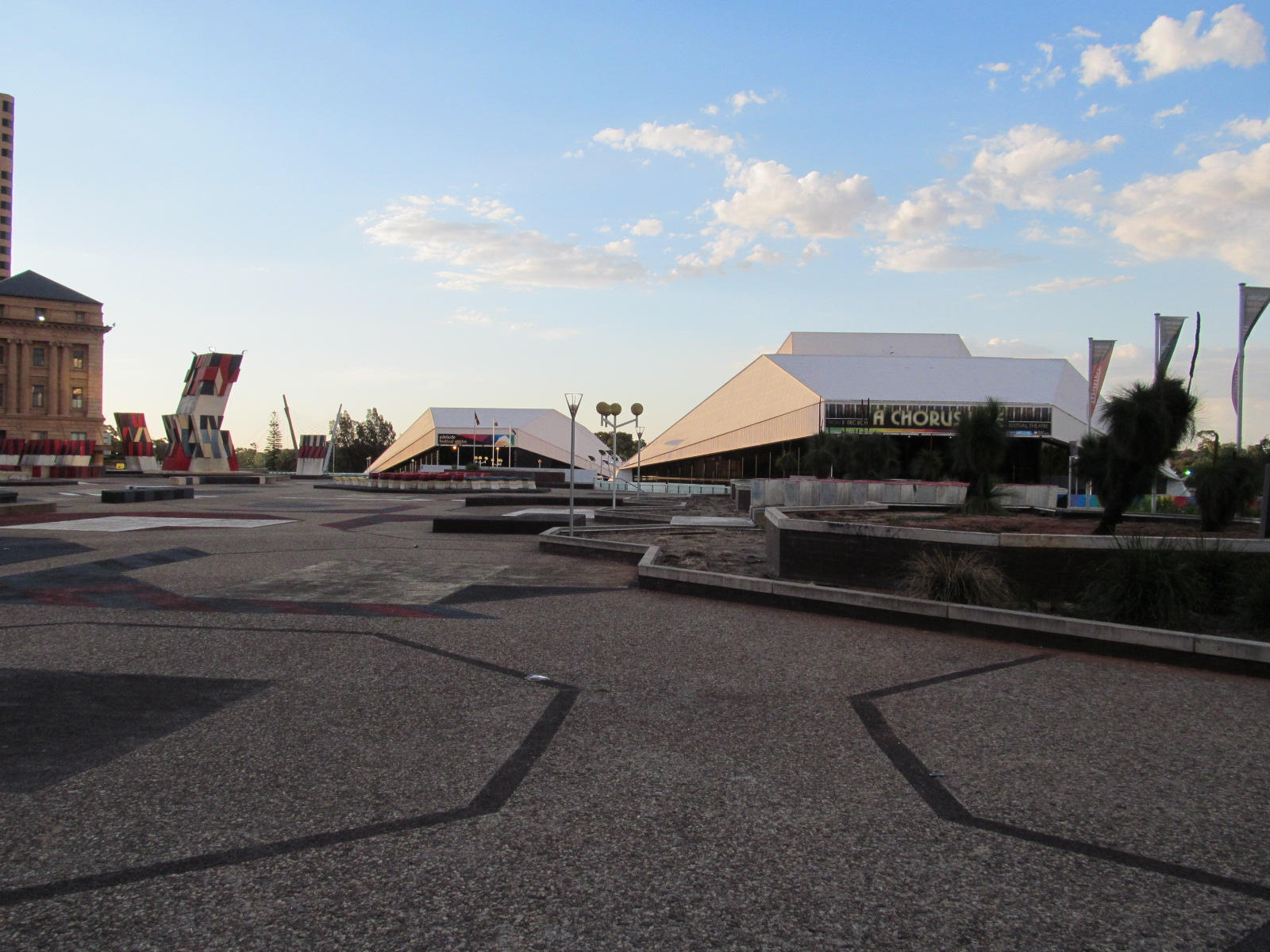
Festival Plaza, 2012

In 2002–2003, the area around the centre was redeveloped substantially. The Festival Plaza was redesigned, including opening the underground roadway to the sky. Although a pedestrian suspension bridge was built on its west side, the Plaza was essentially isolated as a result of this redevelopment.

In 2013, the government announced that the Plaza would be further redeveloped, with Hajek's work decommissioned and replaced. The removal of such a significant public work of art was seen as vandalism by some commentators, including Hajek's wife. However, not everyone in the world of art and architecture or the general public mourned its passing.

From 2016, the Plaza underwent A$90 million redevelopment, as part of the major redevelopment of the Riverbank Precinct. The new public plaza is known as the Public Realm. The architects of the original complex, Hassell, served as architectural consultants for the project, in collaboration with ARM Architecture and landscape architects Taylor Cullity Lethlean for the outdoor spaces. Changes to the design of the Festival Plaza Public Realm submitted for approval in April 2020 pushed back the completion date to 2023. Bert Flugelman's sculptures Vertical Variation and Tetrahedra, along with Sundial by Owen Broughton, have been refurbished and reinstalled in the outdoor spaces.

In 2024, Festival Tower, sited on land that was previously a corner of the Festival Plaza adjacent to the station, was also completed. Construction of Festival Tower Two by Walker Corporation began in early 2026. Dubbed "Adelaide's first skyscraper", it is designed to be 160 m (520 ft) tall. It is located between Parliament House and the Festival centre, next to Festival Tower One, above the underground Festival Car Park. A group called Save Festival Plaza Alliance is opposing the construction of the tower. The overall external redevelopment is expected to be completed in 2028.

==== Interior ====
Interior refurbishment of the Festival Centre was undertaken from August 2025, with the building closed for around six months. In a redevelopment designed by Cox Architecture costing A$55 million, the main infrastructure was upgraded, stage flooring in Dunstan Playhouse and Space Theatre refurbished, seating replaced with high-quality Figueras seating, and fire safety was improved. In addition, a new restaurant called Angry Penguins, honouring the legacy of poet and writer Max Harris and his literary magazine of the same name, was created as the centrepiece of the refurbishment. The Festival Centre's reopening coincides with the 2026 Adelaide Festival on 27 February.

== Governance ==
In 1971, the Adelaide Festival Centre Trust was established as a statutory authority by the Adelaide Festival Centre Trust Act 1971, reporting to the Minister for the Arts. From about 1996 until late 2018, Arts SA (later Arts South Australia) had responsibility for this and several other statutory bodies such as the South Australian Museum and the Art Gallery of South Australia. Arts SA leased Her Majesty's Theatre and the Festival Centre to the Trust, which was responsible for "encouraging and facilitating artistic, cultural and performing arts activities throughout the State" and managing and maintaining the theatres.

In 2006, Douglas Gautier was appointed CEO and artistic director of the organisation.

In July 2017, the Trust bought Her Majesty's Theatre from Arts South Australia for A$8 million. It also borrowed A$62 million from the South Australian Government Financing Authority for a maximum term of 10 years to fund Her Majesty's Theatre redevelopment. From late 2018, the functions previously held by Arts SA were transferred to direct oversight by the Department of the Premier and Cabinet, Arts and Culture section.

As of October 2024, the chair of the Adelaide Festival Centre Trust is Karlene Maywald. In October 2024, CEO and artistic director (AD) Douglas Gautier announced his retirement, effective in the second half of 2025. In March 2025, Kate Gould, who had been CEO and AD of the Brisbane Powerhouse since 2021, was announced as the new CEO of the Festival Centre.

== Venues and facilities ==
Adelaide Festival Centre houses several theatres and galleries, as well as function spaces and the administrative hub of the Festival Centre.

=== Theatres ===
- Festival Theatre is the largest proscenium arch theatre in Adelaide, seating close to 2,000 people.
- Dunstan Playhouse, initially known as The Playhouse, and in 1999–2000 the Optima Playhouse, and then renamed after Don Dunstan, is located in the Drama Centre behind the main building, it is a more intimate venue, seating 590 people. The State Theatre Company has been based here since 1974, and uses the theatre, the rehearsal rooms and the extensive production workshop also housed in this second building.
- Space Theatre is a versatile studio theatre, sharing the Drama Centre building with the Dunstan. It has no traditional stage or fixed seating, meaning its configuration is completely flexible. It can be turned into a theatre in the round, a corner stage setting, or a cabaret venue. The Space seats anywhere from 200 to 350 people, depending on the configuration.{
- Her Majesty's Theatre is 1,500-seat theatre located on Grote Street. First opened in 1913, the theatre underwent extensive rebuilding from 2018 to 2020 to become a world-class venue.

=== Other spaces and facilities ===
- There are a number of event spaces that are hired out for functions, including the Banquet Room and John Bishop Room at the Festival Centre, and the Ian & Pamela Wall Gallery and Pickard Terrace at Her Majesty's.
- Exhibitions are held in a number of gallery spaces, such as the Children's Artspace and The Galleries, in the foyer. Outdoors, there is the Kaurna Reconciliation Sculpture, the Moving Image Program, and the Walk of Fame. In addition, the Festival Centre holds two art collections: Works of Art Collection and the Performing Arts Collection.
- The Amphitheatre is an outdoor space overlooking Elder Park and the River Torrens
- The Angry Penguins restaurant, headed by chef Alex Katsman, opens in late February 2026.

=== Walk of Fame ===
The Walkway of Fame comprises plaques along the path that overlooks the River Torrens and links the Festival Theatre and Dunstan Playhouse. Each year since 1973, three stars are added to the walkway each year: one by public choice, one by the Adelaide Festival Centre Trust (AFCT Choice), and one by a panel of arts critics (Critics' Choice).

== Associated companies and events ==
Adelaide Festival Centre is home to South Australia's leading professional performance companies, including: Adelaide Symphony Orchestra, State Opera South Australia, Australian Dance Theatre, State Theatre Company South Australia, The Australian Ballet, Brink and Windmill Theatre Co.

The centre is the host of Adelaide Festival and presents major festivals across the year, including: Adelaide Cabaret Festival, OzAsia Festival, DreamBIG Children's Festival, Adelaide Guitar Festival, and the First Nations annual art exhibition Our Mob, which also awards a series of prizes. Our Mob was established around 2008, and has expanded with Our Words and Our Stories. As of 2025 Celia Coulthard is First Nations curator.

== Transport ==
Besides numerous nearby bus stops and the adjacent Adelaide railway station, a short branch from the Glenelg tram line to the Festival Centre was opened in October 2018.

Preceding station	Adelaide Metro	Following station
Terminus	Glenelg tram line Weekends and event days only	Rundle Mall towards Moseley Square
