= Choreography =

Art of designing motion of physical bodies

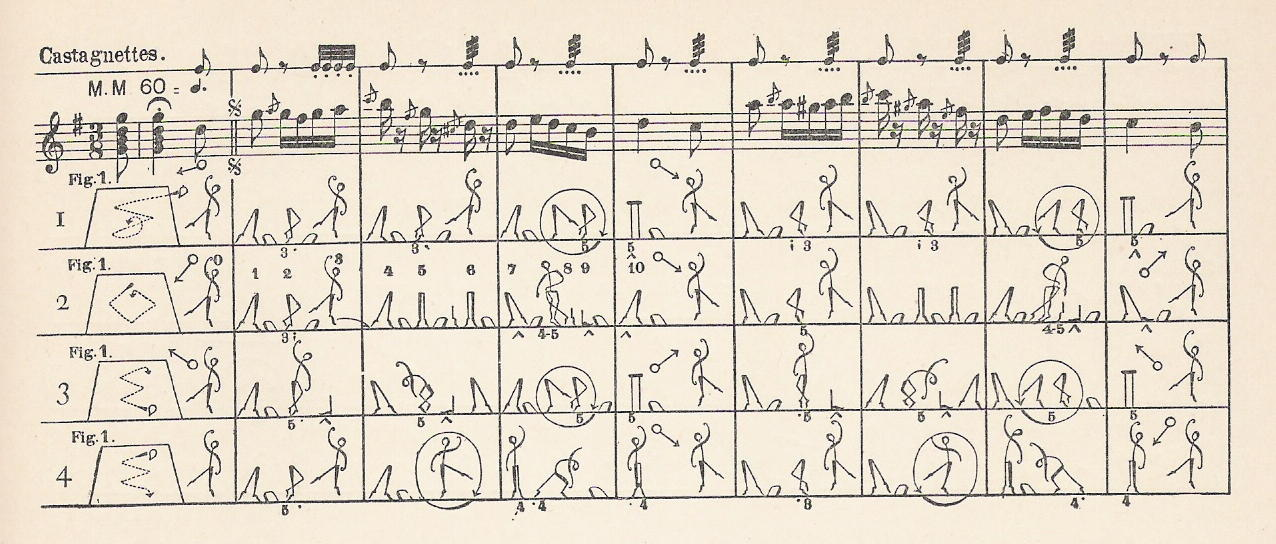
Choreography for the Spanish dance Cachucha, described using dance notation

Choreography is the art of designing sequences of movements of physical bodies (or their depictions) in which motion or form or both are specified. Choreography may also refer to the design itself. A choreographer creates choreographies through the art of choreography, a process known as choreographing. It most commonly refers to dance choreography.

In dance, choreography may also refer to the design itself, sometimes expressed by means of dance notation. Dance choreography is sometimes called dance composition. Aspects of dance choreography include the compositional use of organic unity, rhythmic or non-rhythmic articulation, theme and variation, and repetition. The choreographic process may employ improvisation to develop innovative movement ideas. Generally, choreography designs dances intended to be performed as concert dance.

The art of choreography involves specifying human movement and form in terms of space, shape, time, and energy, typically within an emotional or non-literal context. Movement language is taken from dance techniques of ballet, contemporary dance, jazz, hip hop dance, folk dance, techno, K-pop, religious dance, pedestrian movement, or combinations of these.

== Etymology and history ==
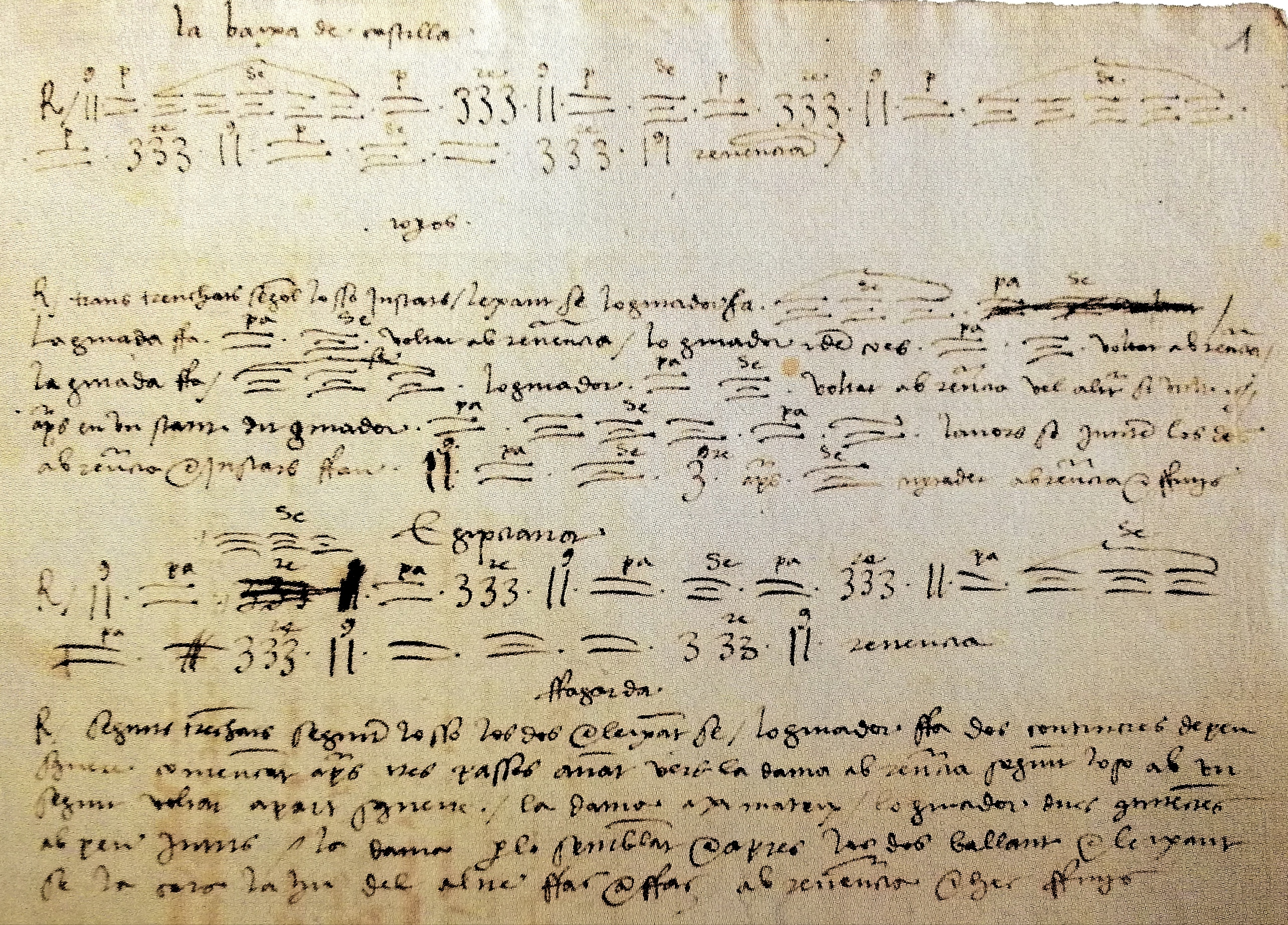
One of the first documents with choreographic signs is the Catalan manuscript of Cervera from 1496

The word choreography literally means "dance-writing" from the Greek words "χορεία" (circular dance, see choreia) and "γραφή" (writing). It first appeared in the American English dictionary in the 1950s, and "choreographer" was first used as a credit for George Balanchine in the Broadway show On Your Toes in 1936. Before this, stage and movie credits used phrases such as "ensembles staged by", "dances staged by", or simply "dances by" to denote the choreographer.

In Renaissance Italy, dance masters created movements for social dances which were taught, while staged ballets were created similarly. In 16th century France, French court dances were developed in an artistic pattern. In the 17th and 18th centuries, social dance became more separated from theatrical dance performances. During this time the word choreography was applied to the written record of dances, which later became known as dance notation, with the meaning of choreography shifting to its current use as the composition of a sequence of movements making up a dance performance.

The ballet master or choreographer during this time became the "arranger of dance as a theatrical art", with a well-known master of the late 18th century being Jean-Georges Noverre, with others following and developing techniques for specific types of dance, including Gasparo Angiolini, Jean Dauberval, Charles Didelot, and Salvatore Viganò. Ballet eventually developed its own vocabulary in the 19th century, and romantic ballet choreographers included Carlo Blasis, August Bournonville, Jules Perrot and Marius Petipa.

Modern dance brought a new, more naturalistic style of choreography, including by Russian choreographer Michel Fokine (1880–1942) and Isadora Duncan (1878–1927), and since then styles have varied between realistic representation and abstraction. Merce Cunningham, George Balanchine, and Sir Frederick Ashton were all influential choreographers of classical or abstract dance; Balanchine and Ashton, along with Martha Graham, Leonide Massine, Jerome Robbins and others also created representational works. Isadora Duncan favored natural movement and improvisation. The work of Alvin Ailey (1931–1989), an African-American dancer, choreographer, and activist, spanned many dance styles, including ballet, jazz, modern dance, and theatre.

== Dance choreography techniques ==
Dances are designed by applying one or both of these fundamental choreographic methods:

- Improvisation, in which a choreographer provides dancers with a score (i.e., generalized directives) that serves as guidelines for improvised movement and form. For example, a score might direct one dancer to withdraw from another dancer, who in turn is directed to avoid the withdrawal, or it might specify a sequence of movements that are to be executed in an improvised manner over the course of a musical phrase, as in contra dance choreography. Improvisational scores typically offer wide latitude for personal interpretation by the dancer.
- Planned choreography, in which a choreographer dictates motion and form in detail, leaving little or no opportunity for the dancer to exercise personal interpretation.

Several underlying techniques are commonly used in choreography for two or more dancers:

- Mirroring - facing each other and doing the same
- Retrograde - performing a sequence of moves in reverse order
- Canon - people performing the same move one after the other
- Levels - people higher and lower in a dance
- Shadowing - standing one behind the other and performing the same moves
- Unison - two or more people doing a range of moves at the same time

Movements may be characterized by dynamics, such as fast, slow, hard, soft, long, and short.

== Choreography today ==
Today, choreography must impose some kind of order on the performance, within the three dimensions of space, the fourth dimension of time, and the capabilities of the human body.

In the performing arts, choreography applies to human movement and form. In dance, choreography is also known as dance choreography or dance composition. Choreography is also used in other fields, including opera, cheerleading, theatre, marching band, synchronized swimming, cinematography, ice skating, gymnastics, fashion shows, show choir, cardistry, video game production, and animated art.

== Competitions ==
The International Choreographic Competition Hannover, Hanover, Germany, is the longest-running choreography competition in the world (started c. 1982), organised by the Ballett Gesellschaft Hannover e.V. It took place online during the COVID-19 pandemic in 2020 and 2021, returning to the stage at the Theater am Aegi in 2022. Gregor Zöllig, head choreographer of dance at the Staatstheater Braunschweig was appointed artistic director of the competition in 2020. The main conditions of entry are that entrants must be under 40 years of age and professionally trained. The competition has been run in collaboration with the Tanja Liedtke Foundation since her death in 2008, and from 2021 a new production prize has been awarded by the foundation to complement the five other production awards. The 2021 and 2022 awards were presented by Marco Goecke, then director of ballet at the Staatstheater Hannover.

There are a number of other international choreography competitions, mostly focused on modern dance. These include:

- Beijing International Ballet and Choreography Competition, Beijing, China
- Contemporary Dance Platform, Cyprus, Greece
- Copenhagen International Choreography Competition, Copenhagen, Denmark (CICC), founded in 2008, annual
- Helsinki Ballet Competition, Choreography Award, Helsinki, Finland
- International Choreographic Competition, Rome, Italy
- Moscow Ballet Competition and Contest for Choreographers, Moscow, Russia
- New Adventures Choreographer Award, London, UK
- Prix de la Danse de Montreal, Montreal, Canada
- Valentina Kozlova International Ballet Competition, Brussels, Belgium
- Varna International Ballet Competition, Choreography Award, Varna, Bulgaria

The International Online Dance Competition (IODC) was introduced in 2020 in response to the COVID-19 pandemic, with a Grand Prix worth US$1,000.

== Copyright Protection of Choreography ==
Section 102(a)(4) of the Copyright Act protects "choreographic works" created after 1 January 1978, and fixed in a tangible medium of expression. Under copyright law, choreography is "the composition and arrangement of a related series of dance movements and patterns organized into a coherent whole." Choreography consisting of ordinary motor activities, social dances, commonplace movements or gestures, or athletic movements may lack sufficient authorship to qualify for copyright protection.

A recent lawsuit was brought by professional dancer and choreographer Kyle Hanagami, who sued Epic Games, alleging that the video game developer copied a portion of Hanagami’s copyrighted dance moves in the popular game Fortnite. Hanagami published a YouTube video in 2017 featuring a dance he choreographed to the song "How Long" by Charlie Puth, and Hanagami claimed that Fortnite's "It's Complicated" "emote" copied a portion of his "How High" choreography. Hanagami asserted claims for direct and contributory copyright infringement and unfair competition. Fortnite-maker Epic Games ultimately won dismissal of the copyright claims after the district court concluded that his two-second, four-beat sequence of dance steps was not protectable under copyright law.

== See also ==
- Ballet master
- Beauchamp–Feuillet notation
- Contact improvisation
- Dance improvisation
- Film editing
- List of choreographers
- List of dance awards § Choreography
- Movement director
- Music video
- Social choreography
- Stage Directors and Choreographers Society
- Category:Ballet choreographers
- List of choreographers
