= South Australian Ruby Awards =

Australian arts awards

The South Australian Ruby Awards, also known as the Ruby Awards, are annual awards which recognise outstanding achievement in South Australia’s arts and culture sector. They were named in honour of arts champion Dame Ruby Litchfield (1912–2001) DBE.

== History and description ==
The Ruby Awards were introduced in 2006 by the Government of South Australia, named in honour of the late arts patron Dame Ruby Litchfield. She was the first woman appointed to the Board of the Adelaide Festival Centre Trust, a founder member of Festival City Broadcasters, and a board member of numerous other organisations, including the Adelaide Festival of Arts, the South Australian Housing Trust and the Carclew Youth Performing Arts Centre.

The Awards were managed by Arts South Australia (formerly Arts SA) until 2018, when they were transferred to the Arts and Culture unit within the Department of the Premier and Cabinet.

Since the year of inception, they have grown in number from eight to twelve.

== Winners ==
=== 2006–2009 ===
Winners
| | 2006 | 2007 | 2008 | 2009 |
|---|---|---|---|---|
| Best Work or Event | Honk If You Are Jesus, State Theatre Company South Australia | Ikara – The Meeting Place, Tony Rosella, sculptor | When the Rain Stops Falling, Brink Productions | 2008 OzAsia Festival |
| Community Impact (Under $100,000) | SALA Festival (2006 Award program included one single award for Community Impact regardless of budget) | South Australian History Week | OzAsia Moon Lantern Festival | Seniors on Screen, Media Resource Centre |
| Community Impact (Over $100,000) | SALA Festival (2006 Award program included one single award for Community Impact regardless of budget) | Bundaleer Forest Weekend | 2007 Feast Festival | Port Augusta Re-Imagines |
| Innovation | Devolution, Australian Dance Theatre | Electro Acoustic Project, Zephyr Quartet | Trouble on Planet Earth, The Border Project | 3xperimentia: Live Cut |
| Leadership in Arts Enterprise | Special projects under development, Craig Andrae | Fringe Benefits | Adelaide Festival Centre – Scenery and Engineering Workshops | The Tragical Life of Cheeseboy 2009 World Tour, Slingsby |
| Sustained Contribution by an Organisation | JamFactory Craft and Design | State Theatre Company South Australia | Adelaide Repertory Theatre | Patch Theatre Company |
| Sustained Contribution by an Individual | N/A | Leigh Warren | Timothy Sexton | Jane Hylton |
| Premier's Award for Lifetime Achievement | Frank Ford AM | Anthony Steel AM | Kym Bonython AO DFC AFC | Fiona Hall |

=== 2010–2013 ===
The Geoff Crowhurst Memorial Award was introduced in honour of actor and director Geoff Crowhurst (23 March 1951 – 4 July 2009).

Winners 2010 – 2013
| | **2010** | **2011** | **2012** | **2013** |
| Best Event | Soundstream: Adelaide New Music Festival 2009 | The Adelaide International Cello Festival 2011 | Barrio, Adelaide Festival | Turner from the tate: The Making of a Master, Art Gallery of South Australia |
| Best Work | Man Covets Bird, Slingsby | Life in Movement, Closer Productions | School Dance, Windmill Theatre | Pinocchio, Windmill Theatre and State Theatre Company South Australia |
| Community Impact (Under $100,000) | Out of the Glass Case: The APY Lands Road Show | Out Blak Adventures | About Time: South Australia's History Festival, History SA | Auburn Courthouse Cultural Centre, HATS Inc (Heritage, Arts and Traditions) |
| Community Impact (Over $100,000) | Windmill Theatre and Mimili Anangu Partnership | COME OUT Festival 2011 Opening Parade | The Spirit Festival, Tandanya | Just Add Water: 2012 Regional Centre of Culture, Country Arts SA and Alexandrina Council |
| Innovation | The Mystery of Flying Kicks, Closer Productions | CACSA Contemporary 2010: The New New | I Am Not an Animal, The Border Project | If There Was a Colour Darker Than Black I'd Wear It, by Caleb Lewis, with Rising Damp, Illuminart and Country Arts SA |
| Arts Enterprise | Format Festival 2010 | Gray Street Workshop | Tuxedo Cat Theatre, Cassandra Tombs and Bryan Lynagh | Illuminart Productions Pty Ltd |
| Sustained Contribution by an Organisation | Restless Dance Theatre | Adelaide Chamber Singers | Carclew Youth Arts | Adelaide Cabaret Festival |
| Sustained Contribution by an Individual | Mary Moore | Stephen Phillips | Garry Stewart | Geoff Cobham |
| Geoff Crowhurst Memorial Award | Margie Fischer | Pat Rix | Cath Cantlon | Ollie Black |
| Premier's Award for Lifetime Achievement | Marjorie Fitz-Gerald OAM | Michael Morley | Robyn Archer | Milton Moon |

=== 2014–2017 ===
Winners 2014 – 2017
| | **2014** | **2015** | **2016** | **2017** |
| Best Event | Dark Heart: 2014 Adelaide Biennial of Australian Art, Art Gallery of South Australia Adelaide Film Festival/Adelaide Festival of Ideas | SALA Festival 2014 | Tarnanthi: Festival of Contemporary Aboriginal and Torres Strait Islander Art, Art Gallery of South Australia | 2017 Adelaide Festival |
| Best Work | Aboriginal and Torres Strait Islander War Memorial, by artists Lee-Ann Buckskin, Tony Rosella, and Michelle Nikou, sculptor Robert Hannaford, and bronze caster Tim Thomson | The Philip Glass Trilogy, State Opera of South Australia | Girl Asleep, A Windmill Theatre Co and Soft Tread Enterprises film | Saul – Adelaide Festival |
| Community Impact (Under $100,000) | Sons & Mothers, No String Attached Theatre of Disability, written and directed by Alirio Zavarce | Barngarla Stories of Resilience, Nexus Arts | Desert Fringe, Adelaide Fringe | Creating Coonalpyn – Coorong District Council |
| Community Impact (Over $100,000) | Pom Pom: Children's Contemporary Art Space, Carclew and Playford Communities for Children Plus | Adelaide Writers' Week, Adelaide Festival | Gorgon: State Educational Regional Tour 2016, State Theatre Company South Australia | SALA Festival 2016 |
| Innovation | ADHOCRACY, Vitalstatistix | Music for Strings and iThings, Zephyr Quartet | Girl Asleep, A Windmill Theatre Co and Soft Tread Enterprises film | Intimate Space – Restless Dance Theatre |
| Arts Enterprise | Bowerbird – Adelaide's Design Market | Fifth Quarter, Carclew's business incubator | Adelaide Symphony Orchestra | N/A |
| Sustained Contribution by an Organisation | Helpmann Academy for the Visual and Performing Arts | Australian Dance Theatre | Adelaide Symphony Orchestra | Tutti Arts |
| Sustained Contribution by an Individual | Shane McNeil | Grant Hancock | Sally Chance | Margie Fischer |
| Geoff Crowhurst Memorial Award | Bob Daly and Kalyna Micenko | Edwin Kemp Attrill | Lee-Ann Buckskin | Alysha Herrmann |
| Premier's Award for Lifetime Achievement | Robert Hannaford | Yvonne Koolmatrie | Rob Brookman and Ulrike Klein ( Jointly awarded ) | Ian Scobie |
| People's Choice Award | N/A | N/A | A Kid Like Me – True North Youth Theatre Ensemble | 2017 UneARTh Festival Whyalla – City of Whyalla and Adelaide Fringe |

=== 2018–2023 ===
The 2018 South Australian Ruby Award significantly reshaped the award categories, including individual categories names in honour of the late Kaurna elder Stephen Goldsmith (the Stevie Gadlabarti Goldsmith Memorial Award for Aboriginal and Torres Strait Islander artistic and cultural achievement) and local arts icon Frank Ford (the Frank Ford Memorial Young Achiever Award), both of whom who died in the same year.

| | **2018 Finalists** **(Winners in bold)** | **2019 Finalists** **(Winners in bold)** | **2021 Finalists** **(Winners in bold)** | **2023 Winners** |
| | The Awards were held at the Queen's Theatre, Adelaide and the judging panel included eight key industry figures, including Heather Croall, Gavin Wanganeen and media personality Jane Doyle. | The 2019 Ruby Awards will be held at Queens Theatre on Friday 29 November. All winners receive a bespoke, ruby-coloured glasswork designed and made at the JamFactory, and a new prize for Premier's Award for Lifetime Achievement was established: a gold nameplate on a seat in the Festival Theatre. The People's Choice Award established in 2017 was not offered. | | |
| **Outstanding Community Event or Project** | - | - | - | **Wild Dog,** Jacob Boehme |
| **Best Festival** | Adelaide Festival 2018; **Adelaide Fringe** 2018; SALA Festival 2017; WOMADelaide 2018 | Adelaide Festival 2019; AltFest 2019; SALA Festival 2018; OzAsia Festival 2018 | **Adelaide Film Festival** | - |
| **Best Work or Event Within a Festival** | **Hamlet** – Adelaide Festival and Glyndebourne Festival Opera (Adelaide Festival 2018); In the Club – State Theatre Company South Australia (Adelaide Festival 2018); Waqt al-tagheer: Time of Change – ACE Open (Adelaide Festival 2018); Place des Anges – WOMADelaide and Gratte Ciel (Adelaide Festival 2018) | Counting and Cracking – Adelaide Festival; **Hotel Mumbai (Adelaide Film Festival 2018) – Producer Julie Ryan and Director/Co-writer Anthony Maras (South Australian key creatives)**; John Mawurndjul: I am the old and the new – Art Gallery of South Australia; The Beginning of Nature – Australian Dance Theatre; Yabarra - Gathering of Light – Adelaide Fringe | Guttered, Restless Dance Theatre; The Pulse, Gravity & Other Myths; **Clarice Beckett: The Present Moment, Art Gallery of South Australia**; The Boy Who Talked to Dogs, Slingsby Theatre Company and State Theatre Company South Australia in association with Adelaide Festival and Draiocht | **Talk to Me**, Danny and Michael Philippou, Adelaide Film Festival 2022 |
| **Best Work or Event Outside a Festival** | **Beep** – Windmill Theatre Co; Colours of Impressionism: Masterpieces from the Musée d'Orsay – Art Gallery of South Australia; Impersonal Space – Company AT and Tutti Arts; On the Terrace – Chamber Music Adelaide | Absence Embodied by Chiharu Shiota – Art Gallery of South Australia; Amphibian – Windmill Theatre Co; The Gods of Strangers – State Theatre Company; **The Young King National Tour – Slingsby Theatre Company** | **Decameron 2.0, State Theatre Company South Australia and ActNow Theatre**; Euphoria, Country Arts SA and State Theatre Company South Australia; Seeing Through Darkness, Restless Dance Theatre | **Beep and Mort – Series One**, Windmill Pictures |
| **Best Work, Event or Project for Young People** | AREA 53 – D'Faces of Youth Arts Inc.; Beep – Windmill Theatre Co; Neo – Art Gallery of South Australia; **Ngarrindjeri Yanun** (Aboriginal Artist Development Initiative) – Carclew Youth Arts | **Baba Yaga – Windmill Theatre Company**; DreamBig Festival 2019 – Adelaide Festival Centre Trust; Drop Out – Directed and Devised by Alirio Zavarce and True North Youth Theatre Ensemble; Neo – Art Gallery of South Australia | Creation Creation, Windmill Theatre Co; Neo, Art Gallery of South Australia; **Zooom, Patch Theatre** | **the Boy & the Ball**, Stephen Noonan |
| **Best Regional or Community Event or Project** | **AREA 53** – D'Faces of Youth Arts Inc.; Collectors/Collections: Waikerie Films – Waikerie District Historical Society and OSCA – Open Space Contemporary Arts; Mi:Wi 3027 – Country Arts SA; SCC Fringe 2018 – Art Engineers (Julianne Pierce), Ashley Sierp and Southern Cross Care | Bush Classroom Initiative – South Australian Museum; Creative Gathering – Ausdance SA; **In the Pines – James Harding and Gener8 Theatre Company**; Vietnam - One In, All In – Country Arts SA | 'Guiding Light' Vietnamese Boat People Monument, RosellaBadios Collaborative Design; **The Heart Beat Club, Access2Arts**; Euphoria, Country Arts SA and State Theatre Company South Australia | **Marungka Tjalatjunu (Dipped in Black)**, Derik Lynch and Matthew Thorne with Switch Productions |
| **Award for Outstanding Contribution by an Organisation or Group** | ActNow Theatre; Stormfront Productions; True North Youth Theatre Ensemble; **Vitalstatistix** | Brink Productions; Nexus Arts; **Restless Dance Theatre**; Zephyr Quartet | Slingsby; Nexus Arts; **Gravity & Other Myths**; Closer Productions | **The Mill Adelaide** |
| **Made in Adelaide Award** (for outstanding artistic or cultural achievement outside of SA by a local show; not to be confused with the Adelaide Fringe Made in Australia Award) | Baba Yaga – Windmill Theatre Co; **Backbone + A Simple Space** – Gravity & Other Myths; Intimate Space at Bleach* Festival (Commonwealth Games 2018) – Restless Dance Theatre; Things I Know to be True – State Theatre Company South Australia | Memorial Brisbane Festival and the Barbican – Brink Productions; **Out of Chaos – Gravity and Other Myths**; Rumpelstiltskin – Windmill Theatre Co and State Theatre Company; Slingsby Goes Global 2018 - 19 touring – Slingsby Theatre Company; The Spinners Edinburgh Fringe Festival and Edinburgh Showcase – Lina Limosani | - | - |
| Best Collaboration | - | - | Floods of Fire, Adelaide Symphony Orchestra with Brink Productions, Tutti Arts, Nexus Arts, Julian Ferraretto, Adam Page, Hilary Kleinig, Zhao Liang, Jakub Jankowski, Grayson Rotumah, Luke Harrald and Lab Adelaide; **The Boy Who Talked to Dogs, Slingsby Theatre Company and State Theatre Company South Australia in association with Adelaide Festival and Draiocht**; Decameron 2.0, State Theatre Company South Australia and ActNow Theatre | **Adelaide Film Festival EXPAND Lab 2022**, Adelaide Film Festival, Samstag Museum of Art, Art Gallery of South Australia, Illuminate Adelaide, The Balnaves Foundation. |
| **Stevie Gadlabarti Goldsmith Memorial Award** | Major Moogy Sumner (founder of Tal-Kin-Jeri Dance Group) | Nici Cumpston | **Lee-Ann Tjunypa Buckskin** | **Natasha Wanganeen** |
| **Frank Ford Memorial Young Achiever Award** | Nicholas Carter (Principal Conductor, Adelaide Symphony Orchestra) | Winner: **Tilda Cobham-Hervey** Highly Commended: Anton Andreacchio | **Grace Coy** | **Alexander Flood** |
| **Geoff Crowhurst Memorial Award** | Nick O’Connor, Director, Northern Sound System | **Winner: Kunmanara (Mumu Mike) Williams** Highly Commended: Ann Newmarch | **Nick Hughes** | **Tony Hannan** |
| **People's Choice Award** | True North Youth Theatre Ensemble | - | - | - |
| **Premier's Award for Lifetime Achievement** | Alison Milyika Carroll, Indigenous artist and community leader at Ernabella/Pukatja | **Paul Blackwell and David Gulpilil** | **Pat Rix** and **Garry Stewart** (joint winners) | **Diana Harris and Nigel Levings** |

=== 2024 ===
| | **2024 Winners** |
| Outstanding Community Event or Project | Papercuts Comics Festival 2023, Papercuts Comics Festival |
| Outstanding Regional Event or Project | Saltbush Country, Country Arts SA and Art Gallery of South Australia |
| Outstanding Work, Event or Project for Young People | Superluminal, Patch Theatre |
| Outstanding Work or Event Within a Festival | Private View, Restless Dance Theatre, Adelaide Festival 2024 |
| Outstanding Work or Event Outside a Festival | The Dictionary of Lost Words, State Theatre Company of South Australia |
| Outstanding Collaboration | Blak Futures, Australian Dance Theatre, BlakDance, Adelaide Festival |
| Outstanding Contribution by an Organisation or Group | Adelaide Youth Orchestra |
| Geoff Crowhurst Memorial Award | Claire Wildish |
| Frank Ford Memorial Young Achiever Award | Lilla Berry |
| Stevie Gadlabarti Goldsmith Memorial Award | Gina Rings |
| Premier's Award for Lifetime Achievement | James Currie |

=== 2025 ===
In 2025, the awards event was hosted by Elaine Crombie, and included performances by Dusty Lee Stephensen, the Adelaide Chamber Singers, WAYIN:THI Collective, and Nat Luna.

| | **2025 Winners** | **Shortlisted** |
| Outstanding Community Event or Project | The Knowledge Project – Kuma Kaaru (led by Jack Buckskin) and Nucleus | Artists on the Inside – KuArts; The Walking Track by Karul Projects – Vitalstatistix |
| Outstanding Regional Event or Project | Kulinma – Wellbeing Project – Anangu Schools Partnership | SALT on the Water: Message in a Bottle – SALT Festival |
| Outstanding Work, Event or Project for Young People | Neo – Art Gallery of South Australia | Can Touch This – Adelaide Contemporary Experimental (ACE); War of the Worlds – Riverland Youth Theatre, D'Faces and Arena; BTS with Jess – BTS with Jess (Jessica McCall) |
| Outstanding Work or Event Within a Festival | Songs Inside World Premiere – Adelaide Film Festival 2024 | Radical Textiles – Art Gallery of South Australia, Adelaide Festival 2024; The Art of Work is a Work of Art, by Kim Munro and collaborators – Vitalstatistix, History Festival 2025 |
| Outstanding Work or Event Outside a Festival | Adhocracy – 15th Anniversary – Vitalstatistix | HIGH – No Strings Attached; Gathering Light – JamFactory |
| Outstanding Collaboration | nyilamum song cycles – Dr Lou Bennett AM, Paul Stanhope, and the Australian String Quartet, in association with Binung Boorigan | The Lensical – Restless Dance Theatre, Michelle Heaven, and Ben Cobham, Women's and Children's Hospital Foundation, Southern Adelaide Local Health Network; Chihuly in the Botanic Garden – Adelaide Botanic Garden, State Herbarium of South Australia, and JamFactory ‍ |
| Outstanding Contribution by an Organisation or Group | Gray Street Workshop | Cirkidz |
| Geoff Crowhurst Memorial Award | Matthew Ives | |
| Frank Ford Memorial Young Achiever Award | Katherine Sortini (writer, actor, and producer) | |
| Stevie Gadlabarti Goldsmith Memorial Award | Umeewarra Aboriginal Media Association | |
| Premier's Award for Lifetime Achievement | Lesley Newton (Adelaide Festival Head of Programming) | |

=== 2026 ===
The 2026 finalists for 9 out of 12 awards were announced on 13 October 2026, with the remaining three category winners to be announced at the ceremony on 13 November.
