= Franz Kempf =

Australian printmaker (1926–2020)

Franz Moishe Kempf AM FRS (20 June 1926 – 8 February 2020) was an Australian artist who worked in Australia and Europe. He was a lecturer in printmaking at the University of Adelaide.

== Early life and education ==
Franz Moishe Kempf was born in Melbourne on 20 June 1926, and studied at the National Gallery of Victoria Art School, then (between 1957 and 1960) in Perugia, Italy, and with Oscar Kokoschka in Salzburg, Austria. In England, he worked as a film designer with Richard Macdonald, and was associated with Peter Blake, Joe Tilson, Ceri Richards and Keith Vaughan. Vaughan had an influence on Kempf’s work of the 1960s.

== Career ==
Kempf worked with and in a variety of media, styles, and methods, including paint, print, etching, lithograph, monotype, screenprint, textile, and woodcut.

Kempf moved to Adelaide, South Australia, in 1963, becoming head of printmaking at the then North Adelaide School of Arts in 1969. He was a senior lecturer in printmaking at the University of South Australia from 1973 to 1981, and a guest lecturer at the Slade School of Fine Art, the University of London, the Edinburgh College of Art, Scotland, and the Gloucester College of Art. He participated in over 90 one-man invitation exhibitions in America, Israel, Germany, Poland, and China.

His thought and work was influenced by Jewish mysticism, Isaac Bashevis Singer, Cavafy and Proust. In his work, he covered subjects from political issues and the natural environment to the spiritual traditions in Judaism. Although from a non-observant background, Kempf turned to following the Chabad movement of Hasidic Judaism, becoming strictly observant.

Professor Sasha Grishin described him as

...an artist whose work presents both a striking continuity throughout a career which has stretched over half a century, and he is an artist whose work presents evidence for constant rejuvenation and reinvention. As a humanist, the concern for man lies at the centre of his universe and the dilemma of being is the central preoccupation. However, the human presence in Kempf’s art is not something which is treated as unproblematic, something to be recorded and to be described literally. For Kempf to be human is something to be celebrated and the artist adopts an ethical stance in his defence of human dignity. Throughout a series of metaphors, symbols and allegories in a sombre and profound manner he commemorates the miracle of being and condemns all that is oppressive and coercive. As a humanist and as a spiritual and religious artist, Kempf has chosen a path which has not been popular with many of his Australian peers. Yet with time as the various fads and fashions pass, Kempf’s art today appears increasingly fresh, vital and relevant to the issues of the present time.

== Honours and recognition ==
In 1964, he was elected as a Fellow of the Royal Society UK, and in January 2003, was appointed a Member of the Order of Australia for his contribution to the Arts.

== Death and legacy ==
Kempf died in Adelaide on 8 February 2020. He was married to Tamar, and left two children and several grandchildren and great-grandchildren.

The Carclew, an arts centre for youth in North Adelaide, manages the IAF Franz Kempf Printmaker Award, awarded biennially to support the professional development of a young South Australian printmaker. The funding for the A$4,000 award was provided as a gift from Kempf to the Independent Arts Foundation, of which he was a longtime member.

The Franz Kempf Memorial Gallery in the Adelaide Holocaust Museum and Andrew Steiner Education Centre (opened in November 2020) contains work by Kempf.

== Publications ==
- ‘Art in Israel’. Broadsheet, Contemporary Art Society, August 1965, pp. 5–7
- ‘Polish Printmakers 1972’, Art & Australia 10,3,1973, pp. 236
- ‘Sculpture in South Australia’, Art & Australia 12, 1, 1974, pp. 46–7
- Contemporary Australian Printmakers. Landsdowne. 1976. ISBN 9780701804695.
- Etchings for Shmuel Gorr, ‘The End of Days’, The Jewish Observer V, 5, October 1968, pp. 16–18, and Shmuel Gorr, ‘The End of Days’, Melbourne: The Levite Press, (1968)
- Ultimate Goal, Franz Kempf, Generation Vol 3 No 4, General Journal Inc, Melbourne Victoria

== Collections ==
Kempf's work is held in the following institutions:

- Victoria and Albert Museum, London
- Betsalel National Museum, Jerusalem
- Mishkenot Sha’ananim, Jerusalem
- Beit Hanassi, Jerusalem
- Jewish Museum of Australia, Melbourne
- Exeter University, Exeter
- Australian National Gallery, Canberra
- Art Bank, Sydney NSW
- Art Gallery of South Australia, Adelaide
- National Gallery of Victoria, Melbourne
- Art Gallery of Western Australia, Perth
- Geelong Art Gallery, Geelong
- Mildura Arts Centre, Mildura
- Newcastle Regional Art Gallery, Newcastle
- Bendigo Art Gallery, Bendigo
- Benalla Art Gallery, Victoria
- Warrnambool Art Gallery, Warrnambool
- Flinders University Art Museum, Flinders University
- University of Adelaide
- University of Melbourne
- Reserve Bank of Australia
- Nillumbik Art Collection
- Broken Hill Proprietary House Collection
- Wollongong City Art Gallery
- Swan Hill Gallery of Contemporary Art
- Premier’s Department, New South Wales
- University of South Australia
- Wagga Wagga Art Gallery, New South Wales
- New England Regional Art Museum, Armidale
- St Ann's College, Adelaide
- Queen Victoria Museum, Tasmania
- Tasmanian Museum and Art Gallery, Tasmania
- Waite Agricultural Research Institute, Adelaide
- Hilton International Hotel, Adelaide
- Parliament House, Canberra, ACT
- Australian National University, Canberra, ACT
- National Museum of Australia, Canberra, ACT
- Guandong Museum of Art China, China
- Victorian Arts Centre, Melbourne
