= Carclew (disambiguation) =

Carclew may refer to:

- Carclew (youth arts centre), a youth arts centre in Adelaide, South Australia
- Carclew, North Adelaide, an historic mansion in Adelaide, South Australia
- Carclew House, a former country house in Cornwall, England, destroyed by fire
- Carclew Primitive Methodist Church, on Carclew Road, Penfield Gardens, Adelaide
