= Urban Myth Theatre Company =

Former youth theatre company in Adelaide, South Australia

Urban Myth
- Formation: 1981
- Dissolved: December 2014
- Type: Theatre group
- Location: Unley, South Australia
- Artistic director: Brigid Kitchin (founder)
- Notable members: Kate Box; Sophie Hyde; Finegan Kruckemeyer; Hugh Sheridan

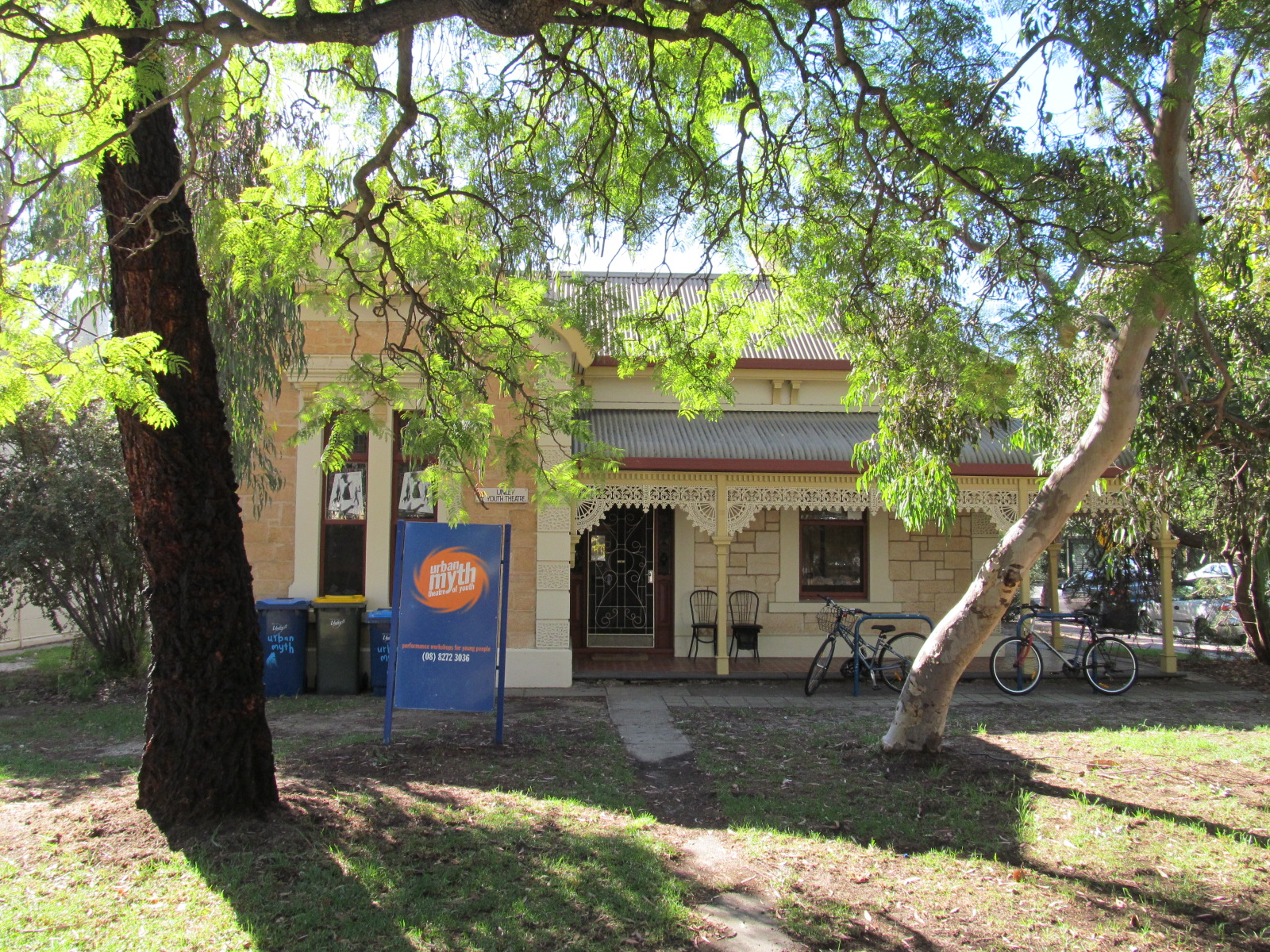
"Cottage" on Edmund Street, Unley

Urban Myth Theatre Company, formerly named Unley Youth Theatre and then Urban Myth Theatre of Youth, was a youth theatre company in Adelaide, South Australia. It was often referred to as simply Urban Myth.

== History ==
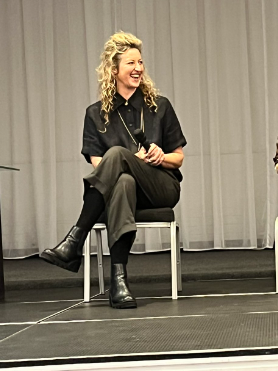
Kate Box

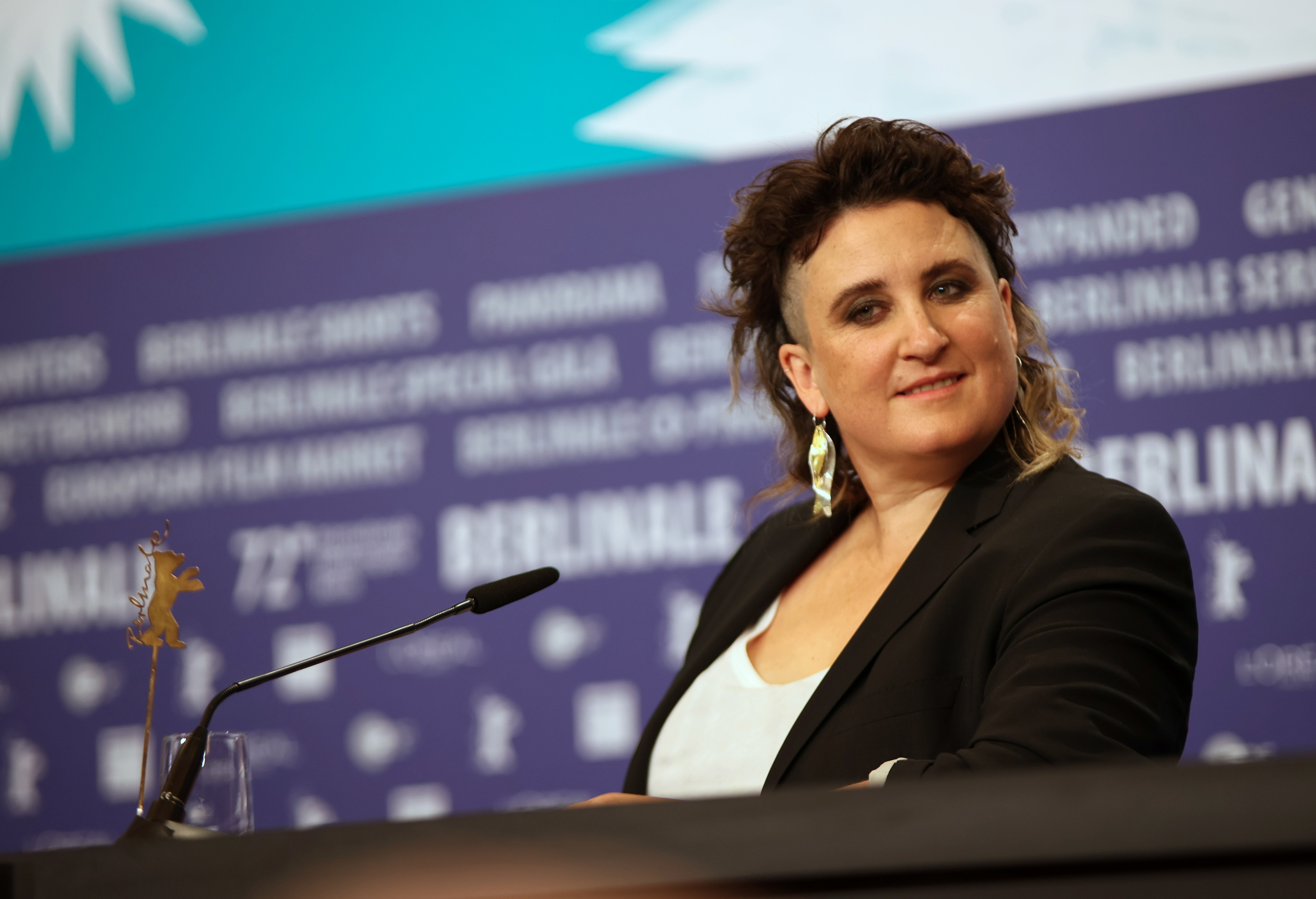
Sophie Hyde

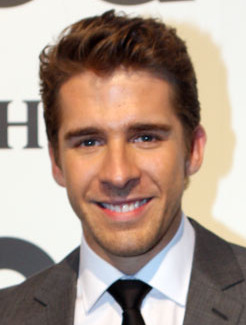
Hugh Sheridan

Unley Youth Theatre was founded by theatre director Brigid Kitchin in the Adelaide suburb of Unley in 1981. With support from Unley Council, the theatre operated from the "Cottage" on Edmund Avenue, for 31 years. Sometime before 2009, it changed its name to Urban Myth Theatre of Youth.

The company catered for children and young people between the ages of 5 and 26, and was Adelaide's only not-for-profit youth theatre company. It provided education in all aspects of theatre, including acting, directing, theatre design, and technical theatre, as well as marketing skills. In 2010, actor Hugh Sheridan, who had himself started his acting career at age 5 at Unley Youth Theatre, became patron of the company.

In November 2009, seven actors from Urban Myth Theatre of Youth, along with artistic director Glenn Hayden and general manager Jo Coventry, travelled to Mumbai, India, to present a production as part of the Thespo Youth Theatre Festival (Note: An annual event organised by the Thespo youth theatre movement in Mumbai since 1999.) over three weeks, including at the Prithvi Theatre. They also engaged in workshops with Theatre Bombay.

By 2012, more than 10,000 young people in Adelaide, rural South Australia, and internationally, had been mentored by Urban Myth, through both workshops and stage productions. Several students credited their time at the company as helpful in combating their social anxiety and depression. Urban Myth worked with school teachers and community groups to support curriculum needs.

For many years, the state government helped to fund Urban Myth through Arts SA, using Carclew Youth Arts' funding programme, and the company received between $50,000 and $300,000 in grant funding annually in total. However, the federal government funding body, the Australia Council for the Arts, cut its triennial funding by $80,000 (63%) in 2011, which restricted the company's ability to create a strategic plan, and there was a lot more competition for grants by other not-for-profits by this time.

In 2012 Urban Myth moved to the Goodwood Institute, as the company needed more space. At this time, it changed its name from Urban Myth Theatre of Youth to Urban Myth Theatre Company. Carclew funding paid all transfer costs and signed an additional three-year financial agreement to help Urban Myth get reestablished at its new venue, which seated 212 people. This was seen as partial compensation for the loss of funding from the Australia Council.

Artistic director Glenn Hayden left the company in August 2014, with his last production being Romeo and Juliet.

However, by 2014, the company found itself $70,000 in debt and unable to pay its staff (three full-time, one part-time), and rent for the privately owned Goodwood Institute was $55,000 per year. The building's heritage listing placed restrictions on advertising that could have brought income to the theatre company. At that time, the SA Government was providing around $97,000. Supporters rallied, gathering signatures on a petition, writing to ministers, and organising a flash mob at Parliament House.

Having decided to voluntarily wind up the company at a board meeting on 15 September 2014, former Urban Myth general manager Rebecca Pannell (who had only been appointed in March of that year), along with visual artist and curator Kat Coppock, set up a crowd-funding campaign to support the staging of a play that over 50 young people had been working on for the previous two years, called Warren, written by Sean Riley.

A Special General Meeting was held on 25 November 2014, after the September meeting voted to explore possibilities other than liquidation. At this meeting, members decided to dissolve the organisation and apply for deregistration.

Unley Youth Theatre/Urban Myth produced over 160 plays during the course of its history.

== SAYarts ==
In 2014, a collective comprising former tutors, directors, writers, and others managed to found a new organisation, SAYarts (South Australian Youth Arts), focused on youth theatre. Led by former Urban Myth general manager Bec Pannell, the co-founders included playwright Sean Riley, actor Claire Glenn, dance teacher Nicole Allen, and various guest tutors. Their first production was Warren in 2014, which had been rescued by the Urban Myth crowdfunding campaign. SAYarts offered regular classes, as well as an opportunity for students aged 13–18 to create and present work with a professional playwright in the Adelaide Fringe each year. SAYarts has staged performances in DreamBIG, AGSA Neo, WOMADelaide, as well as presenting several original shows each year.

As of July 18, 2024, company director Bec Pannell announced the immediate closure of the company. SAYarts ran for 10 years, facilitating the development and performance of over fifteen shows.

== Alumni ==
Many alumni of Unley Youth Theatre and Urban Myth went on to study theatre-related courses at NIDA, WAAPA, ACArts, and Flinders University.

Alumni of the company include:

- Edwin Kemp Attrill, founding director of ActNow Theatre in 2007
- Kate Box, actress
- Matt Cormack, screenwriter of 52 Tuesdays, Fucking Adelaide, and The Hunting
- Miranda Daughtry, NIDA-trained actress who played the lead role in State Theatre Company of South Australia's 2019 production of A Doll's House
- Guy O'Grady, NIDA-trained actor, who played Syme in the 2017 Australian production of 1984
- Sophie Hyde, filmmaker
- Finegan Kruckemeyer, playwright, who said that joining Urban Myth was his "biggest and most formative step"
- Hugh Sheridan, actor and singer
