= Vitalstatistix (arts organisation) =

Women's theatre company based in Port Adelaide, South Australia

Vitalstatistix, formerly Vitalstatistix National Women's Theatre, is a women's theatre company based in Port Adelaide, South Australia, founded in 1984. The organisation is known for a multidisciplinary annual arts event called Adhocracy, which has run from 2010. The company's home is in the heritage-listed Waterside Workers' Hall, which has been closed for repairs since October 2026, likely to reopen in late 2027.

== History ==
Vitalstatistix was founded in 1984 by artists Roxxy Bent, Ollie Black, and Margie Fischer. Ollie Black had been a co-founder of Wimmins Circus in Melbourne in 1979, after a group of women performers from Circus Oz staged a one-off performance called Mighty Bonza Whacko Women's Circus. Wimmins Circus dissolved in 1981.

Vitalstatistix toured extensively in regional South Australia as well as interstate in the early years. It was originally based in the old Holden factory in Port Adelaide. In 1992 the group moved to the heritage-listed Waterside Workers Hall in Nile Street.

It became known an Australia's most prolific full-time professional women's theatre company, and in the 1990s became a national centre for women playwrights and directors. In this role, it was instrumental in the development of many female directors, actors, writers, and designers.

In July 2026, less than a week away from hosting a sold-out Illuminate Adelaide season, an engineer found that there were concerns about the ceiling's load-bearing capacity, to support the semi-permanent aluminium rig holding the lighting, sound, and other equipment. A temporary, freestanding lighting system was installed and the event was able to proceed, but in October 2026 artistic director Greer Holmes announced the temporary closure of the building while the government carried out remediation works. Vitalstatistix had to cancel its 2026 Adhocracy event, and have moved its entire 2027 programme to other venues.

== Governance ==
In 1996, Catherine Fitzgerald was appointed artistic director of the company, a position she held until 2002. During her time, Vitalstatistix commissioned over 40 performances, including premieres, play readings, and national tours.

In 2003, Maude Davey took over the role. She focused on works involving technology, politics, and biology.

When Jane Muller came on board as in 2009 as creative producer/artistic director, she changed direction. The company became more of a creative centre for independent artists and experimental theatre. Fuller was responsible for the conception of the long-running annual show, Adhocracy.

Emma Webb came in 2010 and oversaw the first edition of Adhocracy, and led the company for 14 years. Under her direction, the company undertook a variety of social practice projects and engendered relationships with other performance collectives and presenters around the country. It also provided career support for artists in underrepresented groups, such as queer and Indigenous Australian artists.

As of 2014, the general manager of Vitalstatistix was Helen Sheldon.

In early 2024, Webb stepped down, and in August 2024, Jennifer Greer Holmes, who had been a longterm collaborator, was appointed artistic director.

== Events and artists ==
The organisation is known for a multidisciplinary annual arts event, Adhocracy, which has run from 2010 until the present (2025). The website describes the event as "Vitalstatistix's national hothouse for experimental art and contemporary performance", taking place at the Waterside Workers' Hall, Hart's Mill, and surrounding venues.

Notable artists/groups who have worked with Vitalstatistix include Melbourne-based experimental theatre company The Rabble, Australia's only youth Indigenous performing arts company, Kurraru; Australian playwright Finegan Kruckemeyer, documentary theatre maker Roslyn Oades; former artistic director of State Theatre Company of South Australia, Rosalba Clemente; and former artistic director Catherine Fitzgerald.

== Recognition ==
Vitalstatistix received a South Australian Ruby Award in the 2014 Innovation category for Adhocracy and a 2018 award for Outstanding Contribution by an Organisation or Group.

== Building ==
An interior shot of the building, during a music performance

The Waterside Workers' Hall is owned by the state government. It originally opened in 1927, when the port was booming, and the workforce of wharfies were highly unionised. In the 1990s it was repurposed as an arts venue, and Vitalstatistix moved in in 1992.

The building at 11 Nile Street, officially named the Waterside Workers' Federation Hall, was confirmed as state heritage-listed on 8 August 1996.

Its listing in the South Australian Heritage Register says:

"The former Waterside Workers' Federation Hall, Port Adelaide, opened in 1927, is of high historical and cultural significance as an illustration of the role and importance of the Port Adelaide Working Men's Association. Founded in 1872, the Association was Australia's first union of wharf labourers, with Sydney and Port Melbourne following later that year.

In 1915 it affiliated with the Waterside Workers' Federation of Australia, but used both names until 1989, when the Association was wound up. The Hall provided offices and facilities for the Association and remained in its ownership for over sixty years. At its peak the WWF's membership in South Australia exceeded 3000, but by the 1990s there were less than 200 wharfies employed in Port Adelaide.

Aesthetically and technically, the building is of moderate significance as a typical late 1920s South Australian example of Federation Free Style architecture, exhibiting an eclectic mix of abstracted, classically derived details mixed with "arts and crafts" floral motifs. The Hall has been little altered since construction, and represents function / theatre halls of the 1920s period."
