= University of Adelaide Theatre Guild =

South Australian amateur theatre company

The Adelaide University Theatre Guild is a South Australian not-for-profit amateur theatre company based on the North Terrace campus of Adelaide University. Established in 1938, the Guild is formally recognised as a society associated with the University, as well as being recognised as a club within its Clubs Association. It is one of Australia's longest running amateur theatre companies.

== History ==
The Theatre Guild formed in 1938 alongside a number of local Australian theatre groups aiming to develop intellectual and experimental theatre, and in particular Australian theatre. In the context of acclaimed international university theatre groups, including the Dramatic Societies at Oxford and Cambridge, its academic founders believed that universities "had a responsibility to support serious drama". In its early days, it interspersed its challenging material with less challenging works, in attempting to both meet its founding mandate and maintain a degree of mainstream currency.

In the 1960s, the Guild hit headlines when it was caught in the midst of a dispute between Patrick White and the Board of Governors of the Adelaide Festival over the premiering of the former's first published play, The Ham Funeral. The Ham Funeral was rejected from inclusion in the Festival, as it was deemed too 'difficult' for audiences by the Board of Governors – following this 'controversial' announcement, the Guild's chairman Dr. Harry Medlin received a copy of the script, and he insisted that it be incorporated into the Theatre Guild's 1961 season. After a furore of national significance, the performance at the University of Adelaide was well received by critics and audiences alike, perhaps partially owing to an underdog appeal. In David Marr's biography of White, Patrick White: A Life, Australian critic Geoffrey Dutton said of The Ham Funeral that: "[p]erhaps there was among the audience the thought that a reactionary Establishment was being beaten on its own ground, that the evening was going to be a triumph of the imagination over mediocrity. So it was."

White's next two plays, The Season at Sarsaparilla (1962) and Night On Bald Mountain (1964), were also performed by the Guild in the wake of The Ham Funeral's success. In 1973, White became the only laureate of the Nobel Prize in Literature to receive the prize while an Australian citizen. In 2009, The Season at Sarsaparilla was performed by the Sydney Theatre Company; ironically, in 2012, the State Theatre Company performed The Ham Funeral as a part of the Festival to mark its half centenary.

Peter Goers, known for hosting The Evening Show on 891 ABC Adelaide, was Artistic Director of the University of Adelaide Theatre Guild from 1981 to 1984. Chris Drummond, who has been the Artistic Director of Brink Productions since the inauguration of the position in 2004, was Director-in-Residence of the Guild in 1996. Edwin Kemp Attrill, who was the founder and Artistic Director of ActNow Theatre, was the last Artistic Director of The Guild from 2011-2012.

The Guild was renamed to the Adelaide University Theatre Guild in 2026, following the merger between the University of Adelaide and University of South Australia.

== Venues ==
Most of the performances are in the Little Theatre.
