= ActNow Theatre =

South Australian theatre company

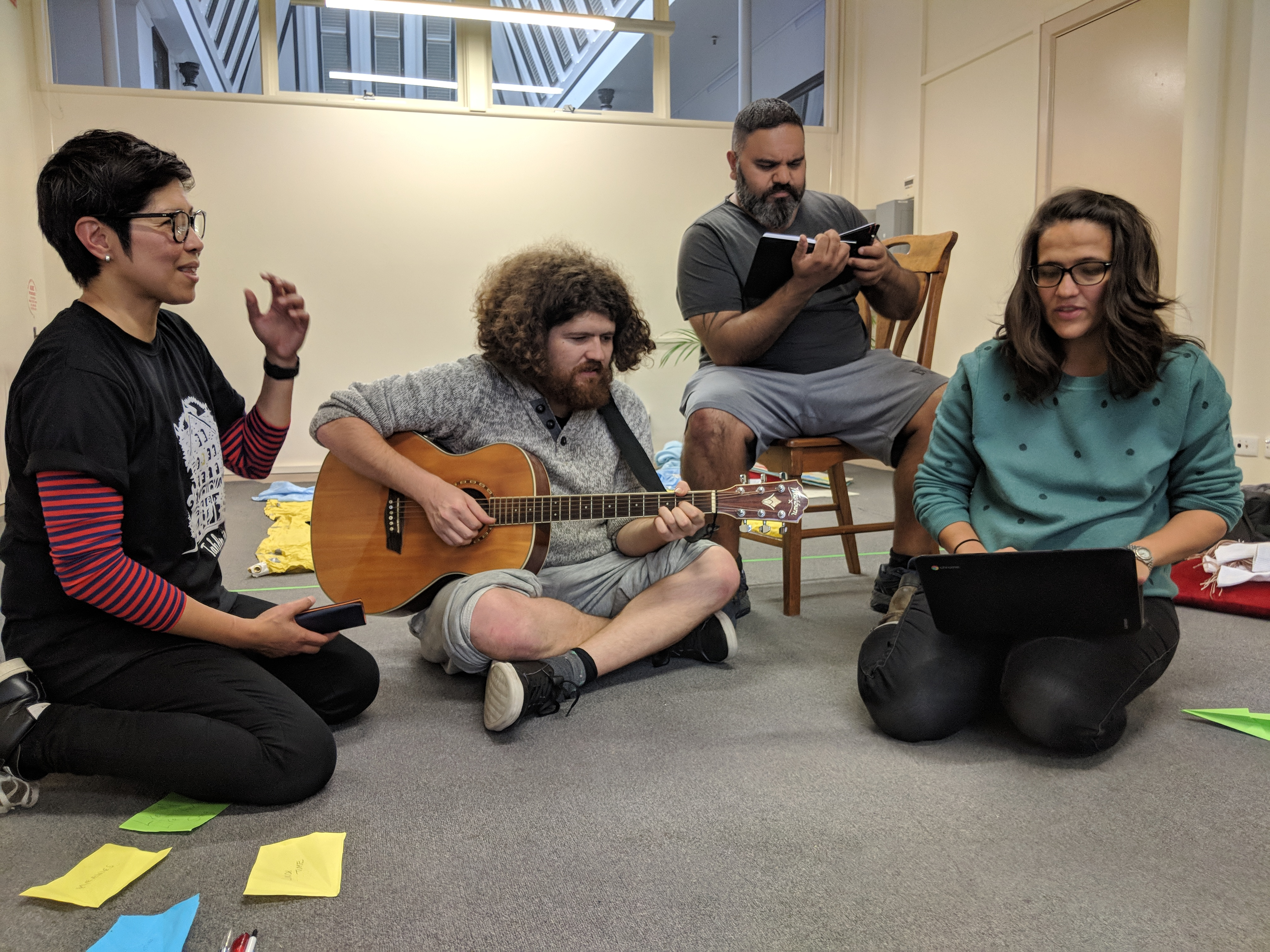
Actors and musician rehearsing a theatre project in MakeSpace

ActNow Theatre is a theatre company based in Adelaide, South Australia. Founded in 2007, it is a community-based company whose work focuses on social justice issues and techniques. From 2007 until 2020, the artistic director/CEO was Edwin Kemp Attrill. In 2021 he was succeeded by Yasmin Gurreeboo.

Notable projects include working with Very Theatre in Taiwan over three years to develop a work called Virtual Intimacy. Another notable project was undertaken during the COVID-19 pandemic in Australia in 2020, called Decameron 2.0. This comprised a series of monologues delivered online, written and performed in conjunction with the State Theatre Company of South Australia. In South Australia, ActNow's projects focus on communities of LGBTIQ+, Indigenous Australians, and culturally and linguistically diverse communities, including a number of programs in schools or for young people.

== History ==
The company was founded in 2007 by three high school friends, including former artistic director Edwin Kemp Attrill. The company initially created street theatre performances, on political issues such as the incarceration of Adelaide-born Guantanamo Bay detainee David Hicks. Performances would often happened uninvited at public events, and would finish before police or security arrived. Initial ensemble members were drawn from the Adelaide branch of Amnesty International Australia and local youth theatre company Urban Myth Theatre of Youth.

Initially the company was located in co-working spaces in UrText Studios and Format Collective. The company was then supported by Carclew through an office space at Fifth Quarter, a co-working space in Brompton, an inner-western suburb of Adelaide.

In 2018 the company established a city-based rehearsal studio, office and small arts venue called MakeSpace.

In September 2022 ActNow was awarded a grant of A$40,000 in Arts South Australia's July 2022 grants round, to fund its 2023 Cultural Leaders Program. The program will develop the cultural leadership skills of a diverse group of ten emerging artists and arts workers.

In 2022, ActNow moved from its premises on Hindley Street into its new home at 253 Gouger Street.

== Description and governance ==
ActNow is a community-based theatre company based at 253 Gouger Street in Adelaide city centre. It includes a theatre venue called MakeSpace, which is also available for hire.

The company is controlled by a board of management and is registered as a charity with Australian Charities and Not-for-profits Commission.

The company creates "devised, interactive and issue-based" theatre projects focused on social justice using techniques such as Augusto Boal's Forum theatre and principles of Community arts and community cultural development. It has been described as "one of the most innovative, inclusive and dynamic companies in Australia" and as one of "a number of extraordinary companies [that] are continuing the work [that Augusto] Boal began". The company's projects focus on communities of LGBTIQ+, First Nations Australians, and culturally and linguistically diverse communities, including a number of programs in schools or for young people. It has been compared to former theatre companies such as Melbourne Workers Theatre and Junction Theatre Company as an arts organisations working across multiple communities.

=== People ===
Edwin Kemp Attrill, former artistic director/CEO, left the company in December 2020. In January 2021, Yasmin Gurreeboo, who had been associate director since joining the company in 2016, was announced as the new artistic director and co-CEO.

Artists involved in the company include Attrill, Gurreeboo, singer/songwriter Nathan May, and poet/writer/performer Manal Younus.

=== Focus and activities ===
Examples of projects include school safety program "Expect Respect" with the Legal Services Commission of South Australia, the anti-racism education program "Responding to Racism" with Reconciliation South Australia, Queer Youth Theatre workshops, the Game Makers program for kids and dads, and workshop program for culturally diverse artists, the Theatre of the Global Majority (2018-2019). The projects involve participatory theatre techniques, which empower audiences to change aspects of the performances and be active contributors and commentators to broader social movements.

In 2023, ActNow is running theatre workshops in primary schools across South Australia, aimed at showing the impact of racism, and why people need to be kind to one another.

== Notable Projects ==
=== Virtual Intimacy ===
Over three years to 2020, ActNow Theatre worked with Very Theatre in Taiwan to develop a new work called Virtual Intimacy (虛擬親密), commissioned by Arts Centre Melbourne's Asia TOPA Festival and National Theatre of Taiwan. The project was developed through collaboration with queer communities and artists in Taipei, Sydney, Melbourne, and Adelaide, and presented at the Asia TOPA festival in March 2020. It explored how people's relationships with technology are changing the relationships between people. The basis of the production was the difference between the background and experiences of the two co-directors, Tung-Yen Chou and Attrill:

Yen, based in Taiwan and coming from a background of film and theatre, is creating highly visual and technical work. Edwin, based in Adelaide, is creating community-based and participatory storytelling projects with a focus on social justice.

The performance explored themes such as queer hook-up culture, identities of gay men and their relationship with technology. Community members were integral to the performances, sharing their own experiences alongside the professional actors in the work. Co-director Edwin Kemp Attrill said:

The performance asks the audience to use their phones to answer questions anonymously, in that way we have made a representation of the internet within the theatre, where everyone is able to comment and contribute to the show. It keeps the audience active, but it also asks them to reflect on their own experiences, even if they haven’t used dating or hook-up apps before, they're still able to reflect on the way that the online world has affected their lives.

=== Decameron 2.0 ===
In 2020, when the state was under COVID pandemic restrictions, ActNow Theatre partnered with State Theatre Company of South Australia (STCSA) to create Decameron 2.0, a project inspired by 14th-century Italian writer Giovanni Boccaccio's Decameron. The original novellas encompassed 100 stories told by 10 young people and their servants who fled to the countryside of Florence, Italy, to escape the Plague. In Decameron 2.0, 100 stories of contemporary South Australian characters were commissioned and filmed over 10 weeks in Adelaide, and streamed between 10 July 2020 and 11 September 2020. It was possibly the largest new work from theatre-makers globally in response to the COVID-19 pandemic and was described as " a COVID-19 masterpiece which one dares to assert remains unparalleled in the world".

The process of creating Decameron 2.0 consisted of a meeting each week between 10 writers, including five core writers: Alexis West, Ben Brooker, Emily Steel, Alex Vickery-Howe, and Sally Hardy; and five guest or community-based writers. In each week's meeting they would be given a theme such as fortune, fate, love and virtue by Co-supervising Directors Anthony Nicola and Yasmin Gurreeboo. Each writer had one day to write it, then it was filmed and edited and delivered digitally at the end of that week.

The project received significant praise for its involvement of diverse stories and storytellers, including cultural diversity, sexuality, disability, age and professional status. Of the core writers Alexis West is a First Nations artist, and was joined by two emerging First Nations writers Kiara Milera and Kyron Weetra, who alternated each week. These monologues by First Nations writers included West’s Teahrnah, played by Elaine Crombie, about a mother being pulled over by the police while driving to the supermarket, making references to the murder of George Floyd with the line "I can't breathe".

Other artists involved in Decameron 2.0 included Mitchell Butel (artistic director of STCSA), Elena Carapetis, Yasmin Gurreeboo, Teddy Hodgeman, Matt Hyde, Trevor Jamieson, Carmel Johnson, Phillip Kavanagh, Edwin Kemp Attrill, Finegan Kruckemeyer, Jack Buckskin, Anna Steen, Verity Laughton, Martha Lott, Sarah Peters, Jacqy Phillips, Susan Prior, Rory Walker, and Manal Younus.

== Awards and recognition ==
ActNow Theatre received a Governor's Multicultural Award in 2014 and again in 2021 as joint award winner.

In both 2017 and 2018, ActNow, together with Reconciliation South Australia, was a finalist in the Australian Human Rights Commission's Racism. It Stops With Me Award, for the programs jointly developed for schools.

The company has been short-listed for several additional South Australian Ruby Awards, including the prestigious Outstanding Contribution by an Organisation or Group Award.

Decameron 2.0 was awarded the 2021 Ruby Award for Best Work or Event Outside a Festival.

In 2022 the company won an Impact Award from PAC Australia.

Former artistic director of the company, Kemp Attrill, has received several awards for his work in community theatre, including the 2013 Channel 9 Young Achievers Proteus Career Leadership Award; the 2015 Geoff Crowhurst Memorial Award; the 2018 Australia Council Kirk Robson Award for Community Arts and Cultural Development; and the Carclew Creative Achievement Award in the 2020 7NEWS Young Achiever Awards.
