= Frank Ford (theatre personality) =

Australian theatre director (1935–2018)

- Born: Frank John Ford; 18 March 1935
- Died: 27 September 2018 (aged 83)
- Occupations: Theatre director, dramaturg, and educator
- Known for: Founding the Adelaide Cabaret Festival (2001)

Frank John Ford AM (18 March 1935 – 27 September 2018) was an Australian theatre director, dramaturg, writer, arts administrator, and educator. He is especially known for being a driving force behind both the Adelaide Fringe Festival and Adelaide Cabaret Festival, which he was largely responsible for founding in 2001.

== Early life and education ==
Frank John Ford was born on 18 March 1935 in Sydney, where he lived until he was 25. He earned his undergraduate degree (BA) at the University of Sydney and did some teaching there.

He studied acting, drama theory, dramaturgy, directing and cinema in his various degrees. He earned a Master of Fine Arts (MFA) at Columbia University in New York. He undertook further studies and Harvard Business School.

== Career ==
Ford was an author and director of opera, music theatre, cabaret, experimental theatre, modern and classic drama, and multi-media productions. His plays, adaptations and cabarets have been performed in Australia and overseas.

In 1960 he left Australia, teaching and working in the theatre for 14 years in London, Frankfurt, Rio de Janeiro, Toronto, Beirut, and New York City. He obtained a teaching post in Rio de Janeiro, where he experienced many small theatres reflecting the life of ordinary people there. He was less impressed by Germany, despite its wealth of classical theatre and opera venues. He then lived in Beirut, Lebanon, and for five years, where he became director of the American Repertory Theatre, which was attached to the American University there, where he presented plays such as Who's Afraid of Virginia Woolf?. During this time, he would visit New York once a year, where he enjoyed the growing popularity of the "off-off-Broadway" little theatres. It was this which led him to undertake an MFA at Columbia.

During his period in New York, alongside his studies, Ford began presenting performances at the Clark Center, which was well known for its dance companies. He also worked at Bob Moss's new venture, Playwrights Horizons, at which professional actors from Broadway shows would perform free of charge.

On visiting Australia in December 1973, he was impressed by the "New Australia" under the Whitlam government, and returned, along with a number of other artists and intellectuals who had "fled" Australia. His brother told him about South Australia under Don Dunstan, who was doing good things for the arts, so he applied for jobs in the state, winning the position of lecturer in drama at the South Australian College of Advanced Education (SACAE) from mid-1974. Ford was head of the drama department at SACAE at the time it merged with the University of Adelaide in 1991, remaining in charge for four years. The drama department was dissolved in 1996 under vice chancellor Mary O'Kane.

Ford directed at least three plays at the University of Adelaide's Little Theatre: the musical play The Tooth of Crime, by Sam Shepard in 1975; The Heidi Chronicles, by Wendy Wasserstein, in 1993; and in 1996, a production of Shakespeare's A Midsummer Night's Dream.

Soon after his arrival, he formed his own theatre company, Icon Theatre Company, along with designer Nick Pyrros. He subsequently formed an association with the only other "alternative theatre" company, Circle Theatre Company, and soon the Association of Community Theatres (ACT) expanded to 40 theatres. Among other activities, the ACT lobbied the Industries Assistance Commission and the Housing Trust to set up an alternative theatre complex Adelaide.

Ford was founding chair of the Adelaide Fringe Festival in 1975, although he was living overseas at the time of its first edition in 1960. In the early years, there was no single body responsible for the Fringe. Ford organised an association with various local community theatre companies, which led to the state government asking him to make it an incorporated body, so that it could be given funding by the government. When he was made chair, he changed the name of the festival to Focus Adelaide Festival Fringe, which it retained for 20 years.

Ford initiated the Adelaide Cabaret Festival, which was first held in 2001, by lobbying the arts minister Diana Laidlaw, and was chair of the Advisory Committee until his death.

Soon after returning to Adelaide in late 1974, Ford became a member of the Performing Arts Committee of the Australian Elizabethan Theatre Trust, located in Sydney. After the Sydney Trust ran into financial difficulties, Ford, along with Jessica Dames and Lynn Crosby, formed the Independent Arts Foundation (IAF) in 1991. He served as served as board member, deputy chair, and then chair for nine years, ahead of his stepping down in July 2016, when he joined Diana Laidlaw as one of two patrons of the IAF. As of 2026 the IAF continues in Adelaide, with Jane Angel as chair and former arts journalist Samela Harris on the board since her retirement from The Advertiser in 2012.

Ford served on many other arts boards, such as Country Arts SA, Adelaide Festival and as chair of the Australian Dance Theatre. He was also a founding member of the Adelaide Fringe Donor Circle, which awards grants to artists.

== Recognition and awards ==
- First Honorary Life Member of Adelaide Fringe
- 1999: Member of the Order of Australia, for service to the development of the performing arts in South Australia as a director, playwright, administrator, and educator
- 2001: Centenary Medal for services to the community, particularly through the performing arts
- 2006: Inaugural Premier's "Life Time Achievement" Ruby Award for the Arts
- 2015: Finalist, South Australian Senior of the Year
- 2015: City of Adelaide Citizen of the Year, for his service to the arts in Adelaide
- 2025: Adelaide Cabaret Festival Icon Award
- 2017: Honorary member of the Actors Equity division of the Media Entertainment and Arts Alliance

== Personal life ==
Ford's life partner was Sam Harvey, who was a primary school teacher when they met. Harvey went back to university, and moved into art administration. They were together for 42 years.

== Death and legacy ==
Ford died on 27 September 2018 at the age of 83. Adelaide Festival Centre CEO Douglas Gautier said that Ford had been "the father of Cabaret and the very reason the Adelaide Cabaret Festival exists", while the Adelaide Fringe said he was known as the "father of the Fringe". On Tuesday 16 October 2018, over 700 people gathered at the Festival Centre to commemorate his life. Composer and sound artist Jason Sweeney wrote a track in Ford's memory.

In 2018 the South Australian Ruby Awards established the Frank Ford Memorial Young Achiever Award.

Starting in 2019, the Frank Ford Commission at the Adelaide Festival Centre started granting A$20,000 per year for 10 years, to be spend on commissioning a new work from a South Australian cabaret artist or group. The funding comes from a bequest left by Ford, and the first recipients of the award were singers Amelia Ryan and Libby O'Donovan, for their show Unsung.

Ford also left a bequest worth $20,000 annually to the Adelaide Fringe, to assist a South Australian artist present their work interstate or overseas, and $10,000 annually to Cabaret Fringe Festival for a similar purpose.

The Pinnacle Foundation awards a scholarship to a young LGBTQI South Australian student to study in the performing arts in the names of Frank Ford and his partner Sam Harvey.
