= Margie Fischer =

Jewish Australian artist and LGBTIQA+ advocate

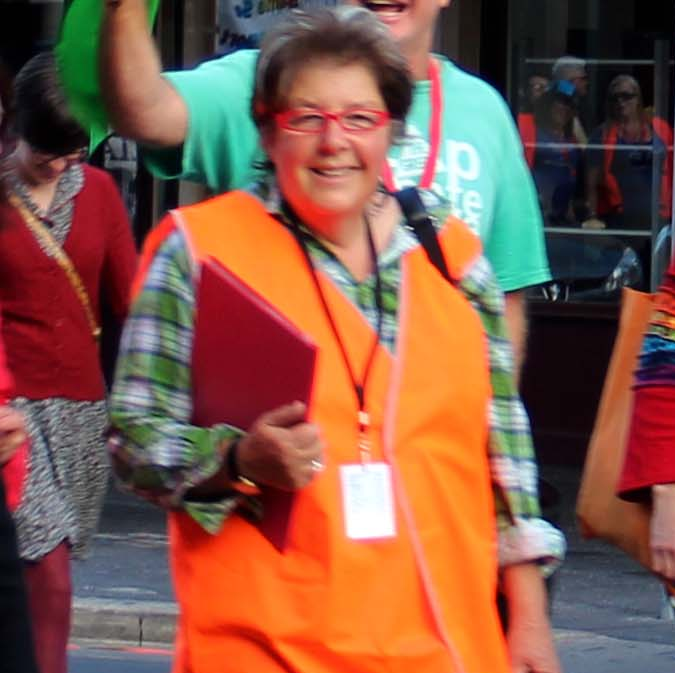
Fischer in 2013 at Pride March Adelaide

Margaret Charlotte Fisher, known as Margie Fischer, is a Jewish Australian artist and LGBTIQA+ advocate based in Adelaide, South Australia. She was a co-founder and artistic director of Vitalstatistix and Feast Festival, and received an order of Australia for "significant service to the festival sector, and to the LGBTIQ community".

== Early life ==
Fischers parents were Austrian Jewish refugees who survived the Holocaust, lived in Shanghai and migrated to Australia in 1950's. Some of her family had died in concentration camps. Fischer was born in Sydney, Australia. She describes herself and her family as "progressive" Jews, and spoke Yiddish and Austrian at home. Her brother died at 27 years old when Fisher was 27. Fisher moved in Adelaide in the early 1980s where she met her partner Ros Bent.

== Vitalstatistix ==
Fischer was co-founder of National Women's Theatre Company, Vitalstatistix, with Roxxy Bent, Ollie Black. The organization is based in the heritage listed Waterside Workers Hall, and creates work from a feminist perspective and supporting women artists.

== Feast Festival ==
Fischer was co-founder of Feast Festival, with Helen Bock, Damien Carey, Luke Cutler in 1997. Originally known as Adelaide's lesbian and gay cultural festival Feast Festival now describes itself as Adelaide's LGBTIQA+ Arts and Cultural Festival. According to Fischer, Adelaide at the time did not have a queer arts festival because since Don Dunstan had decriminalized homosexuality there was "nothing to rebel against" as was the case with the protest origins of Sydney Mardi Gras. Many community events which had been previously organised by the Gay and Lesbian Counseling Service were taken over by Feast.

== Awards and honors ==
Fischer has received multiple awards and honors for her work in arts, community development and LGBTIQA+ advocacy, including:

- Sustained Contribution by an Individual, Ruby Award, Arts South Australia, 2017
- Citizen of the Year, Adelaide City Council, 2012
- Geoff Crowhurst Memorial Award, Ruby Awards, Arts South Australia
- Australia Medal for "significant service to the festival sector, and to the LGBTIQ community".
