= Adelaide Holocaust Museum and Andrew Steiner Education Centre =

Museum in Adelaide, South Australia

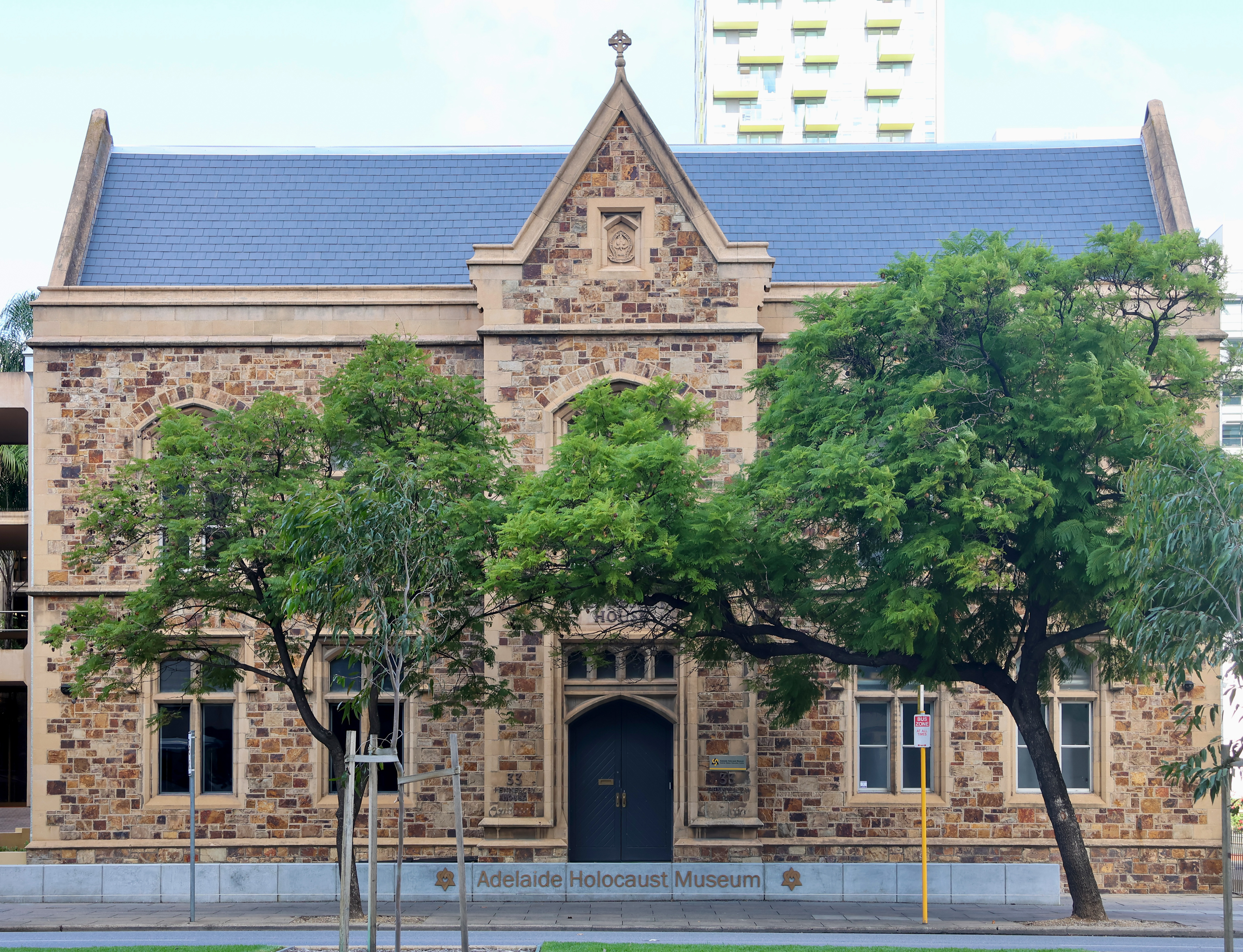
- Fennescey House in 2026
- Established: 17 November 2020
- Location: Fennescey House, 33 Wakefield Street, Adelaide, South Australia
- Coordinates: 34.9288°S 138.6020°E
- Type: Holocaust museum and education centre
- Founder: Andrew Steiner
- Website: ahmsec.org.au

South Australian Heritage Register
- Official name: Fennescey House Offices
- Designated: 11 September 1986
- Reference no.: 13413

The Adelaide Holocaust Museum and Andrew Steiner Education Centre (AHMSEC) is a museum housed in the historic Fennescey House at 33 Wakefield Street, in Adelaide city centre, just east of Victoria Square/Tarndanyangga.

== The museum ==
Fennescey House belongs to the Catholic Church, and is located on the grounds of St Francis Xavier's Cathedral. The education centre is named after Andrew Steiner OAM, an Adelaide Holocaust survivor and sculptor who had been providing education about the Holocaust to school students for the previous 30 years. He had driven the project, which was largely funded with donations from Gandel Philanthropy. Students of architecture from the University of South Australia were involved in the design of the museum, and the project team for its creation worked closely with the Jewish Holocaust Centre in Melbourne. One of Steiner's sculptures, a figure of Polish teacher hero of the Holocaust Janusz Korczak, is a centrepiece of the museum.

The aim of the museum and its education program is to educate people, especially young people, about the history of the Holocaust, to "critically reflect on its themes and their relevance in contemporary society", and to combat antisemitism and racism.

The museum was officially launched on 9 November 2020, the date significantly chosen to commemorate Kristallnacht, when in 1938 German Nazis burnt down synagogues, vandalised homes, schools and businesses belonging to Jews, and killed nearly 100 people, marking the start of the Holocaust. The museum opened its doors to the public a week later, on 17 November 2020.

== Galleries ==
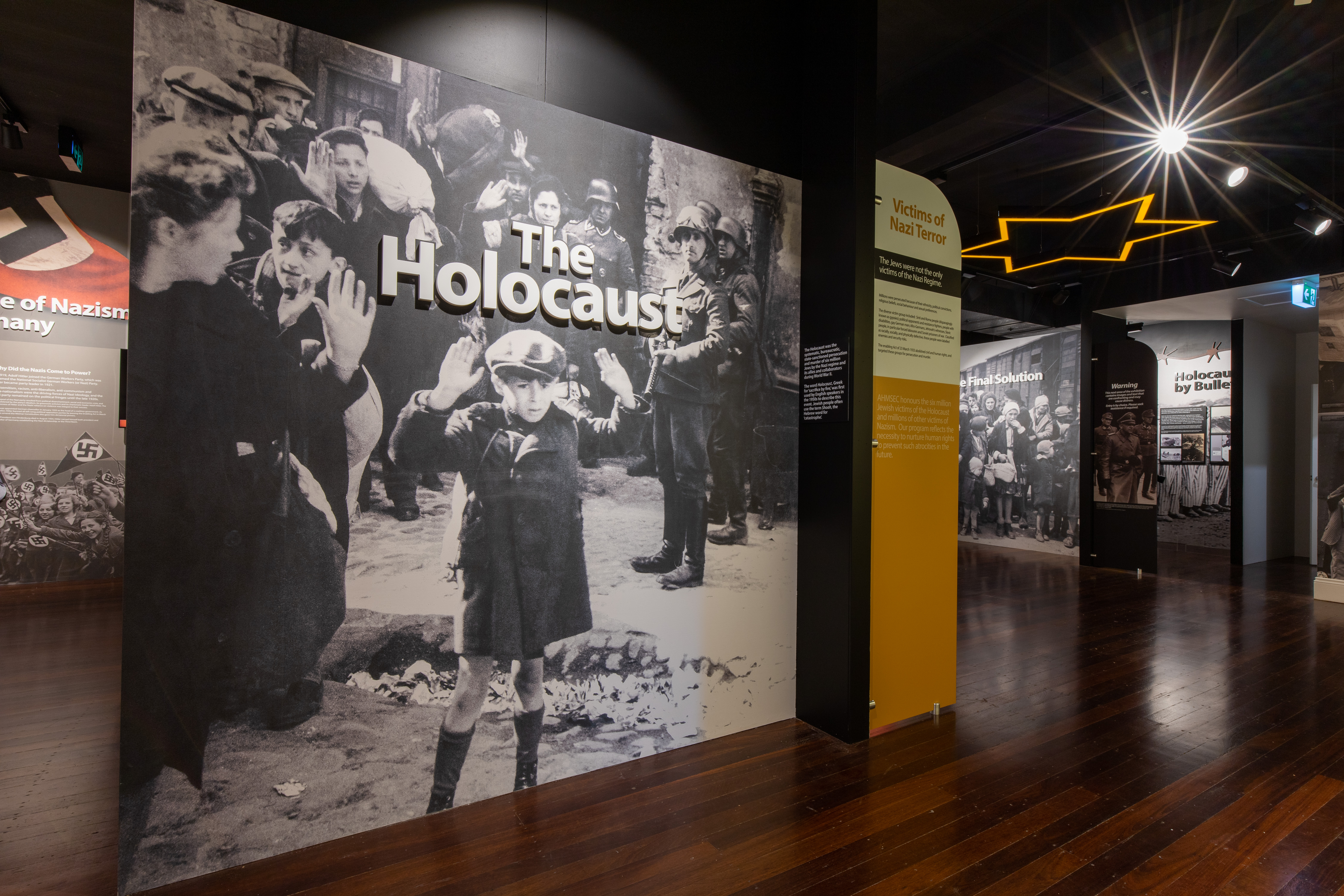
The interior of the Adelaide Holocaust Museum with artwork depicting the Warsaw Ghetto boy

The museum comprises four galleries:

- The Anne Frank Gallery houses the permanent exhibition.
- The Lefmann Gallery contains historical artefacts, personal items and photographs relating to six holocaust survivors who live in Adelaide. One of these is Eva Temple, who was saved as a baby by her grandmother and kept alive in the Bergen-Belsen concentration camp.
- The Jack and Robert Smorgon Families Foundation Gallery houses the education centre, which hosts programs for schools and for the general public.
- The Franz Kempf Memorial Gallery is a small gallery featuring works by artist Franz Kempf, known as the Holocaust series.

Shortly before its opening, the federal government announced A$2.5 million of funding for further development of the museum.

The museum is temporarily closed for ongoing renovations, which are expected to be completed by December 2026. A reopening date has not yet been set, as the museum team is currently recurating the newly renovated space.

== Targeting by neo-Nazis ==
After a group of neo-Nazis had posted photographs of themselves giving fascist salutes outside the museum premises on social media, Minister for Multicultural Affairs Zoe Bettison said that there would be a Parliamentary inquiry into "neo-Nazi symbols, the activities of extremist groups, discrimination faced by targeted groups and the prohibition on symbols in other states".

== Fennescey House ==
The heritage-listed Fennescey House was designed by architect Harrold Herbert (Herbert) Jory (20 March 1888 – 16 May 1966) in the Gothic Revival style, and built around 1940 as an education office for the Catholic Church. The building's name derives from its patrons, Mary and John Fennescey, who donated £20,000 towards its construction. The building is on the South Australian Heritage Register and is listed by the National Trust of South Australia (NTSA).
