= Ruby Litchfield =

Australian theatre director, board member and community worker

Dame Ruby Litchfield DBE
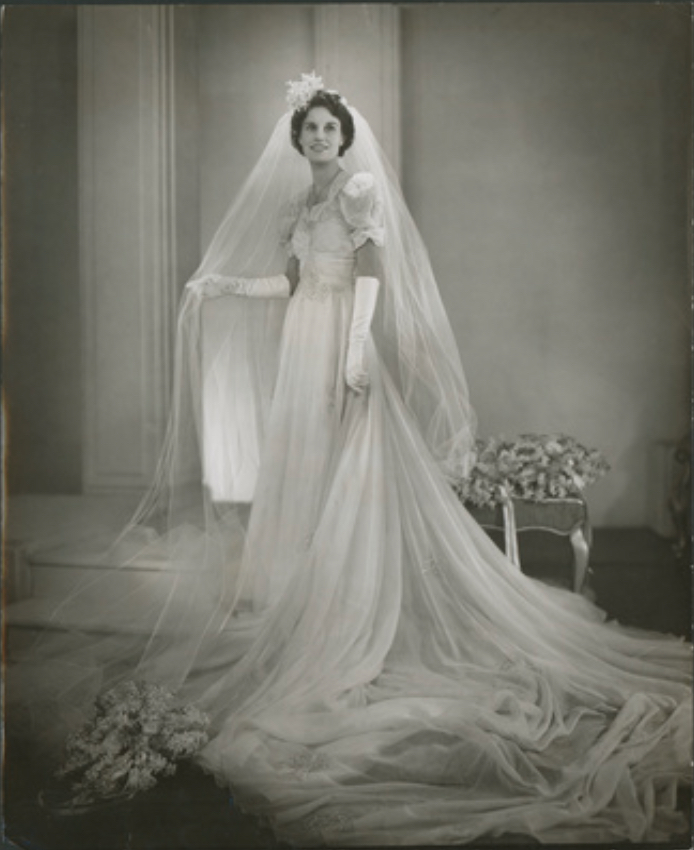
- Litchfield in her wedding gown

Mayoress of Prospect
- In office 1954–1957

Director, Adelaide Festival Centre Trust
- In office 1971–1982

Personal details
- Born: Ruby Beatrice Skinner; 5 September 1912 Subiaco, Western Australia
- Died: 14 August 2001 (aged 88) Adelaide, South Australia
- Spouse: Kenneth Litchfield (m. 1940)
- Children: 1 daughter
- Parents: Alfred John Skinner (father); Eva Hanna (mother)
- Occupation: Theatre director, board member, and community worker

Dame Ruby Beatrice Litchfield DBE (née Skinner; 5 September 1912 – 14 August 2001) was an Australian theatre director, board member and community worker.

== Early life and education ==
Litchfield was born Ruby Beatrice Skinner in Subiaco, Western Australia on 5 September 1912. She moved to Adelaide, South Australia with her family where she was educated at North Adelaide Primary School and Presbyterian Girls' College (now Seymour College). In the 1920s she was successful at dancing competitions and was trained in elocution by Thelma Baulderstone.

== Career ==
As a young woman, Litchfield was a successful tennis player, winning a number of hard court championships in South Australia between 1932 and 1935. In 1936, she was "Miss Tennis" in the quest held in Adelaide for "Miss Centenary", chosen by popular vote.

While teaching elocution, she also performed with the Adelaide Repertory Theatre from 1930. She was a board member of the Repertory Theatre from the 1940s and in the 1940s and 50s raised funds for the Red Cross by organising tennis tournaments and producing concerts and plays.

On 27 August 1940, she married Kenneth Litchfield. She continued playing competitive tennis and performing in amateur dramatics. In 1967 she was made a life member of the Adelaide Repertory Theatre.

She was the first woman to be appointed to the board of both the South Australia Housing Trust and, in 1971, the Adelaide Festival and Centre Trust.

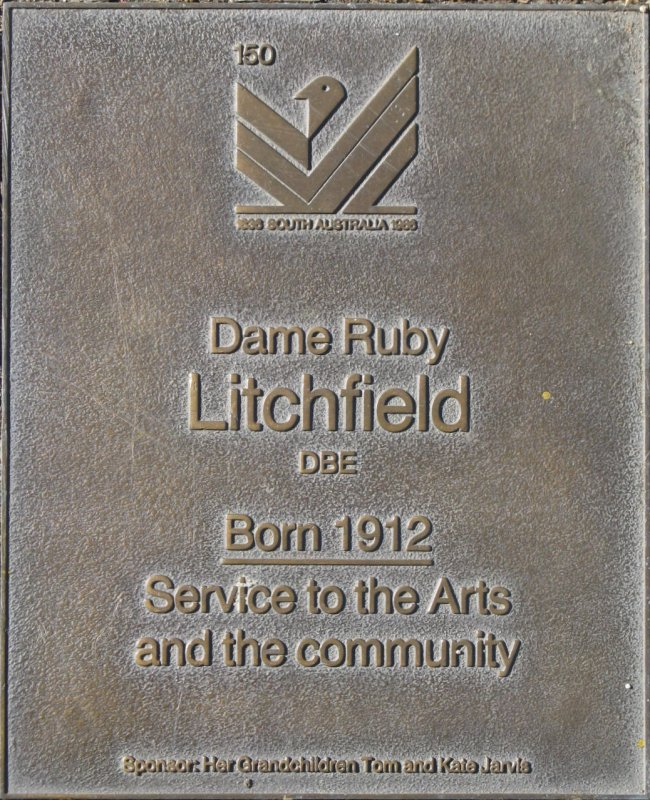
Litchfield's plaque in the Jubilee 150 Walkway

== Awards and recognition ==
Litchfield was appointed an Officer of the Order of the British Empire in the 1959 New Year Honours for her work in social welfare. In the 1981 Queen's Birthday Honours she was promoted to Dame Commander of the Order of the British Empire for "service to the performing arts and the community".

In 1986, she was honoured with a plaque in the Adelaide's Jubilee 150 Walkway, which was sponsored by two of her grandchildren.

== Death and legacy ==
Litchfield died in Adelaide, South Australia on 14 August 2001.

In 1993, the Dame Ruby Litchfield Scholarship for Performing Arts was inaugurated by the SA State Government. It was administered by Carclew and discontinued in 2016.

Since 2006, the Ruby Awards have been presented annually by the Government of South Australia to honour Litchfield and recognise achievement in arts and culture.

In 2019, she was inducted onto the Suffrage 125 City of Adelaide Honour Roll in recognition of her life's work.
