= Douglas Gautier =

Australian arts administrator

Douglas Gautier AM

Deputy Chancellor of Flinders University
- In office 2023–2025 Serving with Stephen Hains (Aug–Dec 2023), Elizabeth Perry (2023–2024)
- Chancellor: Stephen Gerlach; John Hood
- Preceded by: Ian Yates; Leonie Clyne
- Succeeded by: Leanne Liddle

Douglas Alexander Gautier AM is an Australian arts administrator. He lived in Hong Kong for around 25 years, where he worked in various roles in the arts and entertainment world, before being appointed CEO and artistic director of the Adelaide Festival Centre Trust in 2006. He retired from this position in mid-2025. He also served on the Flinders University Council, and was deputy chancellor of the university from 2012 until 2025 (with his final term extension being from 2023–2025).

== Early life and education ==
Douglas Alexander Gautier grew up in Adelaide, South Australia.

He studied drama at Flinders University, graduating in 1975 with a BA (Hons). At that time Wal Cherry was the founding professor of the drama department at that time. Gautier's favourite teacher was history lecturer James Main, but there was also a Japanese lecturer in direction who inspired an interest in Asian art.

== Career ==
Gautier first joined the State Theatre Company of South Australia, as a trainee director and actor. In 1973 he appeared in the opening show of the Adelaide Festival Theatre, Beethoven's opera, Fidelio.

In 1977 Gautier worked at the BBC as a music and arts producer, before becoming head of Radio Television Hong Kong's music and arts channel in 1979, He stayed in Hong Kong for around 25 years, where he became very interested in Chinese and other Asian music of all types.

In 1986 he was appointed head of concert music planning for the Australian Broadcasting Corporation in Sydney. He returned to Hong Kong to take up the position of deputy managing director of Metro Broadcast, before being appointed director of corporate affairs for Star TV (then owned by Fox) in Hong Kong. In 1997 he was appointed deputy executive director of the Hong Kong Tourism Board.

In 2002 he became executive director of the Hong Kong Arts Festival.

Gautier took up the position of CEO and artistic director of the Adelaide Festival Centre Trust in 2006. During his tenure there, he booked major productions, including the Disney stage musical of Aladdin in April 2019. This was the first time a main stage Disney theatrical production had ever been presented in South Australia, and required direct representations to senior staff at Disney Theatrical in New York. During his time there, a major redevelopment of Her Majesty's Theatre, an Edwardian theatre built in 1913, was undertaken to make it into a comfortable and commercially viable venue, which now seats 1500. The Adelaide Festival Centre has also undergone significant renovations and redesign of the exterior areas, which continues as of 2025.

Gautier was responsible for introducing First Nations programming, including OUR MOB, starting with visual arts around 2008, and expanding into OUR WORDS and OUR STORIES. He established the major arts festivals OzAsia and the Adelaide International Guitar Festival. Gautier presided over the growth of the Adelaide Cabaret Festival, and the children's festival previously known as Come Out was expanded and relaunched as DreamBIG Children's Festival in 2017. He aimed to make Adelaide into an "all year round" festival city, and has also been conscious of the need to have a balance of types and scale of works, including large commercial work and musicals as well as community work, free work, exhibitions, and work with Adelaide theatre companies.

Gautier announced his retirement, effective mid-2025, in October 2024. His work at the festival centre and for the wider arts community was praised by the Trust chair, Karlene Maywald, and Premier Peter Malinauskas said that his legacy would be "felt for generations".

== Other roles ==
Gautier advocated for Adelaide to become a UNESCO City of Music in 2015.

In 2012 he was appointed by Flinders University Council as one of two deputy chancellors for a four-year term. He was deputy chancellor of the university from 2023 until 2025.

Gautier was founding vice chair of the Asian Arts Festival Association, and a board member of the Asian Cultural Council. He is or was a director of the Asia Pacific Centre for Arts and Cultural Leadership, a partnership between the Adelaide Festival Centre Trust and the University of South Australia, established in 2013 with federal funding. He has also been an executive councillor of Live Performance Australia, and on the advisory board of the Global Cultural Districts Network.

As of October 2024 he chairs the executive council of the Association of Asia Pacific Performing Arts Centres and is a member of many boards, including the Australia-Singapore Arts Group, the Global Cultural Districts Network Advisory Board, the Adelaide UNESCO City of Music Board, the National Foundation for Australia-China Relations Advisory Board, and the American Chamber of Commerce Council of Governors.

== Recognition and honours ==
In 2006, Gautier received a distinguished alumni award from his alma mater, Flinders University.

Gautier was made a Member of the Order of Australia in the 2016 Australia Day Honours List, "For significant service to arts administration through leadership roles with a range of institutions, to tertiary education, and to the community".

Also in 2016, Gautier featured in a photographic exhibition at Flinders University entitled Flinders Fifty Creatives, featuring "graduates have made their mark in theatre, film, television, communication, publishing, digital media and other creative industries".

== Personal life ==
Gautier's wife is Chinese, and they have two daughters. In a 2013 interview Gautier said that they travelled to Hong Kong frequently to visit family and friends.
