= Gravity & Other Myths =

Australian acrobatic contemporary circus troupe

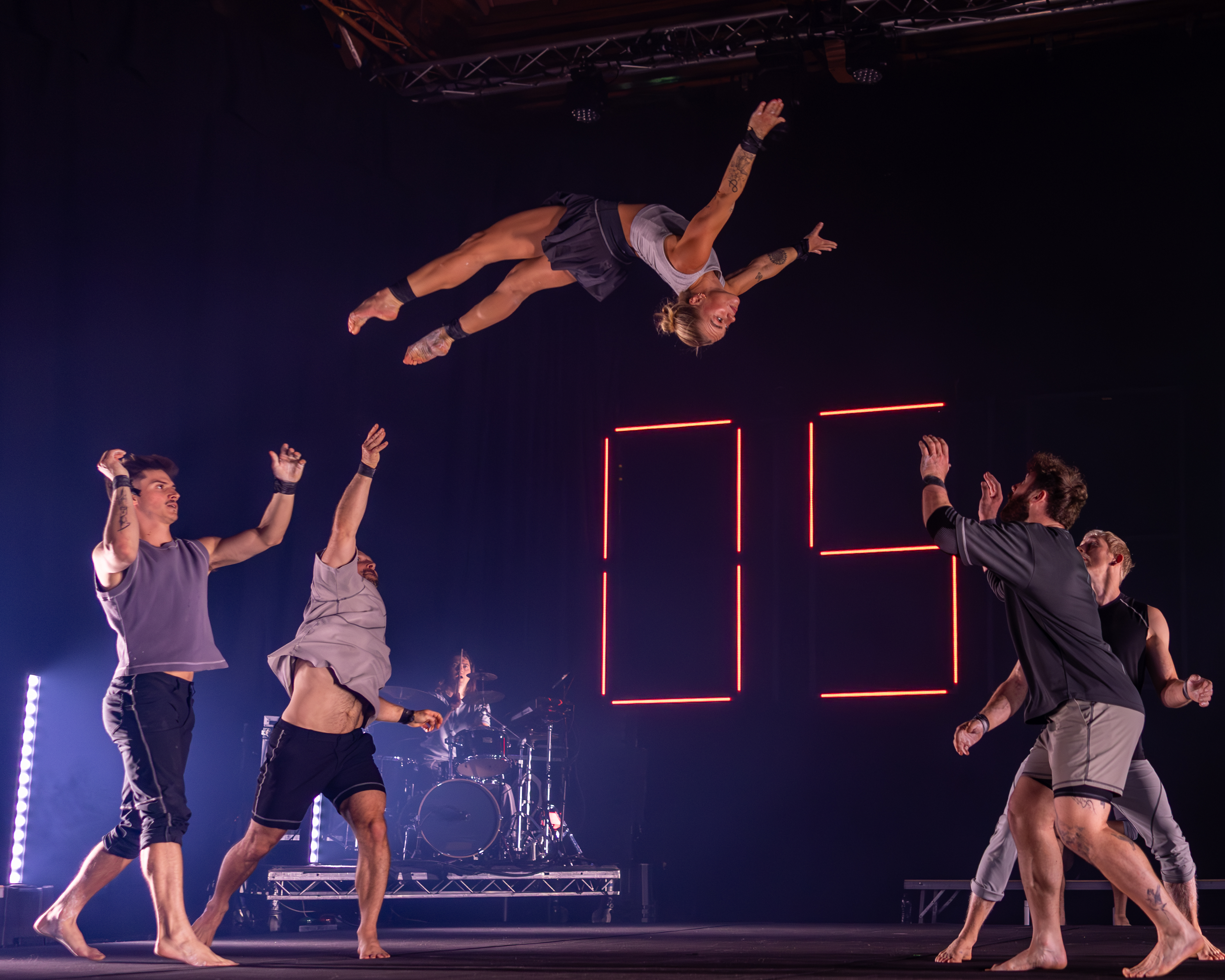
Gravity and Other Myths performing "Ten Thousand Hours" at the 2025 Edinburgh Festival Fringe

Gravity & Other Myths (GOM) is an acrobatic contemporary circus troupe based in Adelaide, South Australia, founded in 2009. It has performed at the Adelaide Festival of the Arts and the Adelaide Fringe, and toured in Australia and internationally. In 2019 the group won a Helpmann Award for Best Visual or Physical Theatre Production, for Out of Chaos, and has been nominated for or won several other awards.

== History ==
Gravity & Other Myths (GOM) was formed by a group of students participating in the Australian Cirkidz program in 2009. Elliot Zoerner, Jascha Boyce, Jacob Randell, Lachlan Binns, and Martin Schreiber were co-founders.

The group has appeared at festivals and theatres in Australia, including the Adelaide Festival of the Arts, as well as touring to many countries. It rotates through a changing repertoire of shows.

== Style ==
Unlike many circus acts, Gravity & Other Myths' artists do not hide the intense physical effort of their acts, instead highlighting the effort to comedic effect. During some acts there is a close contact with the audience which sits or stands around the stage, and the atmosphere between acts is informal. The performances include traditional circus skills such as acrobatics, juggling, and clowning, but combine these with elements of dance and theatre.

In 2021, during the COVID-19 pandemic in Australia, the company had a huge response when it conducted recruitment sessions in Adelaide to increase the number of performers by eight.

== Awards and nominations ==
The group has been nominated for and won several awards, including:

- 2015: Dance Award for Best Physical Theatre
- 2015: Green Room Award for Outstanding Contemporary Circus
- 2017: Nominated, Best Choreography in a Ballet, Dance or Physical Theatre Production, in the 17th Helpmann Awards, for Backbone
- 2017: Geoff Cobham nominated for Best Lighting Design, in the 17th Helpmann Awards, for Backbone
- 2018: Winner, Made in Adelaide Award at the Ruby Awards, for Backbone + A Simple Space
- 2019: Winner, Best Visual or Physical Theatre Production in the 19th Helpmann Awards, for Out of Chaos...
- 2018: Winner, Made in Adelaide Award at the Ruby Awards, for Out of Chaos
- 2021: Winner, Award for Outstanding Contribution by an Organisation or Group, Ruby Awards
- 2021: Finalist, Best Work or Event Within a Festival, for The Pulse

== People ==
As of January 2025, five of the co-founders are still with the company, in various roles:

- Elliot Zoerner – composer, musician
- Jascha Boyce – producer, acrobat
- Jacob Randell – finance manager, acrobat
- Lachlan Binns – acrobat
- Martin Schreiber – acrobat

Darcy Grant is artistic director, and there are many other acrobats as well as several other musicians and other technical and support staff.

Geoff Cobham was formerly lighting designer, including for Backbone in 2017.

== See also ==
- List of circuses and circus owners
