= Edwin Kemp Attrill =

Theatre artist and activist

- Attrill in 2026
- Occupations: Theatre director; Arts administrator; Activist
- Known for: Co-founding ActNow Theatre
- Notable work: Responding to Racism; Virtual Intimacy; Decameron 2.0
- Awards: Geoff Crowhurst Memorial Award (2015); Kirk Robson Award (2018); Carclew Creative Achievement Award (2020)

Edwin Kemp Attrill is a theatre artist and activist from Adelaide, South Australia, who has received several awards for his contribution to community arts and cultural development.

== Themes ==
His work is focused on interactive theatre techniques, community engagement, and social justice themes.

== Career ==
In 2011 Attrill became the artistic director of the University of Adelaide Theatre Guild, one of Australia's longest running amateur theatre companies. He was the first artistic director of the Theatre Guild since Chris Drummond.

Attrill was the co-founder and artistic director of ActNow Theatre, which he started when he was 17 years old. ActNow Theatre originally created guerrilla-style street theatre performances about social justice issues. It eventually moved into staged work and community-based projects, focusing on community arts and cultural development, and known for its "boal-ian" forum theatre to create interactive and issue-based work. Under Kemp Attrill's role as artistic director, ActNow Theatre received multiple awards and federal and state funding.

Attrill's roles on various projects with the company included as director and facilitator of interactive performance Responding to Racism, which received a South Australian Governor's Award for Multiculturalism, as one of the executive producers and the director of photography of theatre/film COVID-19 response project Decameron 2.0, and as co-director of co production with Taiwan's Very Theatre called Virtual Intimacy.

In 2020 Kemp Attrill notified the ActNow Theatre Board that he would not be seeking to renew his contract, citing a focus on “the next stage of his career and professional development”, and leaving the role at the end of 2020. He later became the creative director of social enterprise Replay Creative which aims to improve access to film and online audiences for local performing arts organizations. In 2023 he worked on a new presentation of the work Virtual Intimacy with Very Theatre for Mix Festival in São Paulo, Brazil.

== Awards ==
- Leadership Award Winner, 2013 Channel 9 Young Achiever Award
- Geoff Crowhurst Memorial Award for an individual contribution to community cultural development, 2015 Arts South Australia Ruby Awards
- Kirk Robson Award for Community Arts and Cultural Development, 2018 Australia Council for the Arts Awards, for "outstanding leadership within the [Community Arts and Cultural Development] sector"
- Governor of South Australia's Award for Multiculturalism,
- Carclew Creative Achievement Award, 2020 Seven Network Young Achiever Awards
