= OzAsia Festival =

Annual arts festival in Adelaide, South Australia

- Genre: Arts
- Date: October–November
- Frequency: Annual
- Locations: Adelaide, South Australia
- Years active: 2007–2019, 2021–2026
- Inaugurated: 2007
- Most recent: 9 October – 1 November 2026
- Organiser: Adelaide Festival Centre
- Website: www.ozasiafestival.com.au

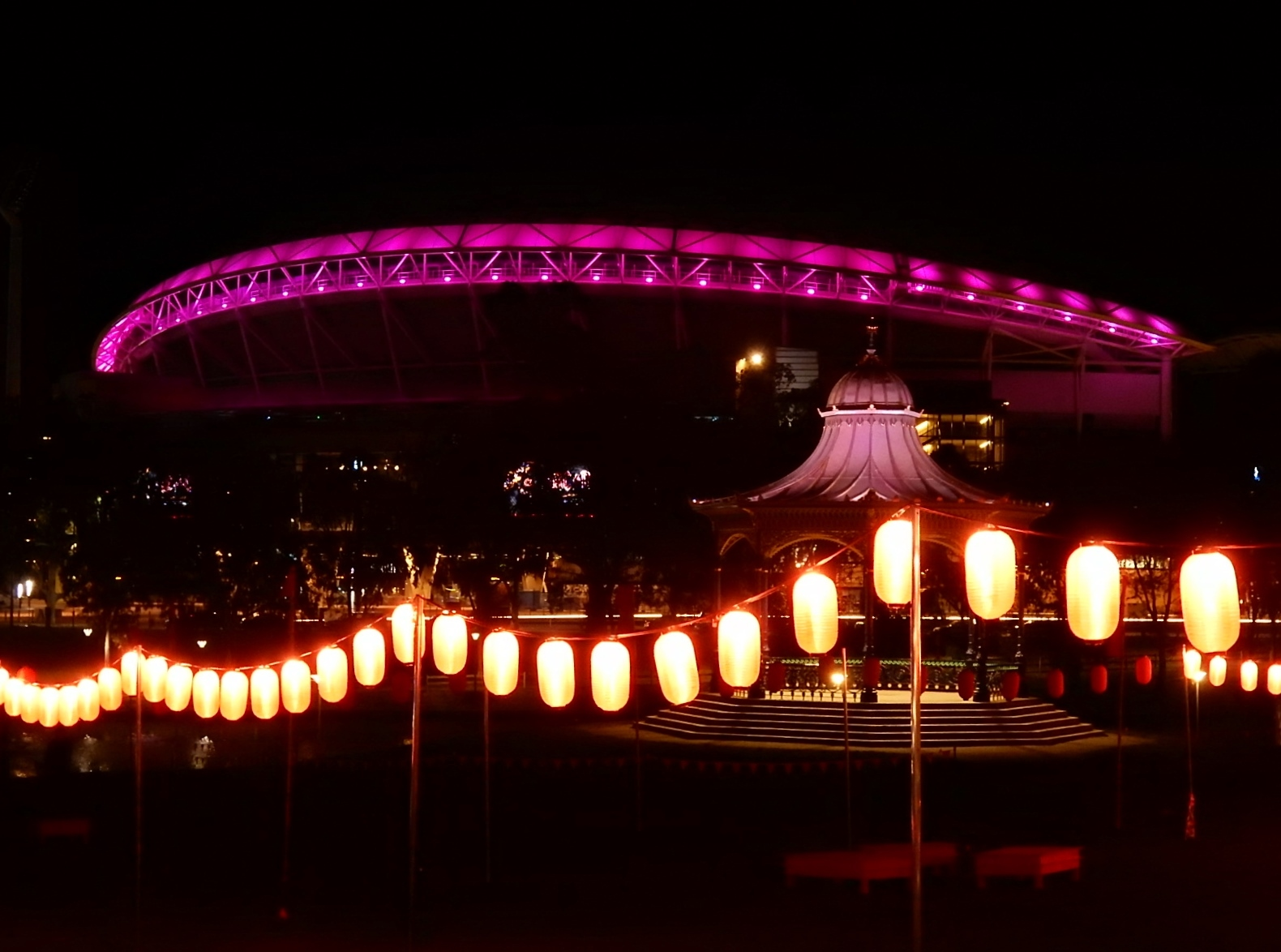
OzAsia Festival moon lanterns in Elder Park in Adelaide, South Australia, 2015.

OzAsia Festival, or simply OzAsia, is a major arts festival in Adelaide, South Australia. It is an Asia-focused festival presented by the Adelaide Festival Centre for two weeks in late October to early November each year. Founded in 2007, the festival features theatre, dance, music, film, and visual arts from across Asia as well as outdoor events and food stalls. In some years it has focused on specific regions or countries in Asia. Since 2017, the festival has included the Lucky Dumpling Market, comprising numerous food stalls set up along the river bank. From 2018 to 2020, the event included JLF Adelaide, an offshoot of the Jaipur Literary Festival, and in 2021 OzAsia Festival presented In Other Words, a digital and in-person literature festival. In 2025, the literary component of OzAsia was dubbed Weekend of Words. The 2026 festival is the final event.

== History ==
After the Government of South Australia wiped a A$28-million debt from Adelaide's Festival Centre in the 2005–2006 State Budget, the Festival Centre began a five-year financial rebuilding programme. OzAsia Festival resulted from the Government of South Australia and the Adelaide Festival Centre, led by CEO and artistic director Douglas Gautier, partnering in 2007 to create a new arts festival of national and cultural significance, and was one of several ideas to revive the Adelaide Festival Centre.

The inaugural OzAsia Festival was held 21 September – 7 October 2007, and stood on two key guiding principles: the contribution of Australian artists and performers who identify with an Asian cultural heritage and the constant stream of collaboration between Australia and its regional neighbours. Its program was built on four pillars: performing arts, visual arts, cultural debate, and community involvement.

The first OzAsia Festival program was produced by executive director, Nick Skibinski, who was succeeded by Jacinta Thompson as festival director the following year. From 2010 to 2015, the festival undertook a country of focus initiative, each year emphasising a particular country to grow stronger cultural ties between Australia and key countries in the region. 2010 it was Korea; 2011, Japan; 2012, India; 2013, Malaysia; and 2014, Thompson's last program, China.

In 2015, Joseph Mitchell became the OzAsia Festival artistic director. He shifted the program rationale from focussing on a single country each year to instead showcase the best contemporary art and artists from across Asia, including the Middle East (Western Asia).

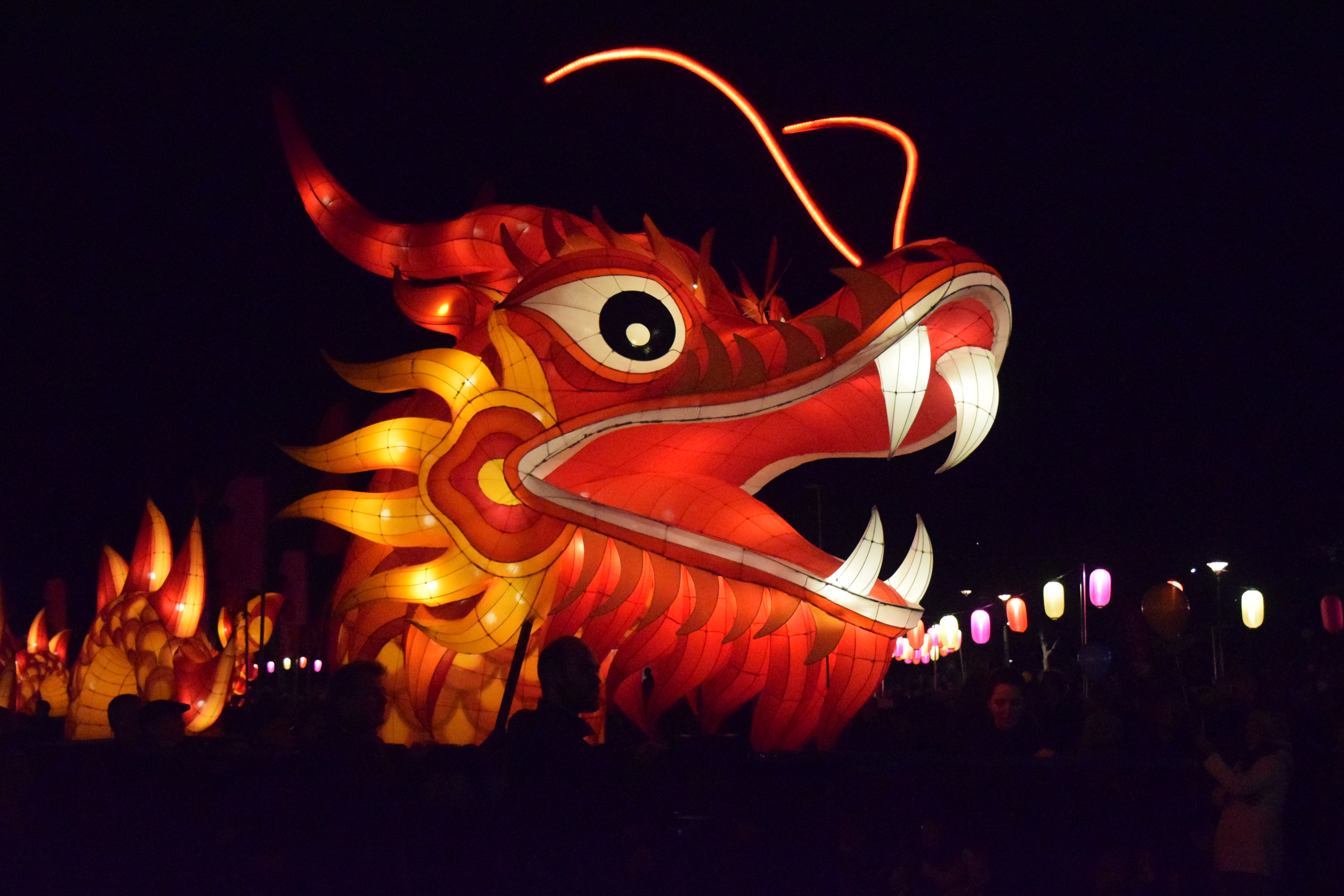
Hong Kong Dragon from Moon Lantern Parade as part of the 2016 OzAsia Festival opening in Elder Park, Adelaide, South Australia.

In May 2020 Annette Shun Wah was appointed director of the festival, taking over from Joseph Mitchell.

The festival in November 2020 was cancelled owing to the COVID-19 pandemic in South Australia. In 2021 it went ahead from 21 October to 7 November, though some shows were cancelled due to COVID-19. It was reported that festival organisers also cancelled the participation of the Hong Kong Cultural Association of South Australia due to its use of yellow umbrellas, a symbol of the 2014 Umbrella Movement.

In 2022 OzAsia Festival celebrated its 15th year with more than 175,000 attendances across ticketed and free events. The program, under the artistic direction of Annette Shun Wah, featured more than 500 community, national and international artists.

In 2024, there were 220,000 attendees at the festival.

In August 2026 it was announced that the current year's event, scheduled to run from 9 October until 1 November, would be the last OzAsia Festival, and would be a celebration of 20 years of the festival. A free event, it would feature a performance by Brisbane rock band Regurgitator. Kate Gould, CEO of the Festival Centre, said that the decision was made after hearing from stakeholders that "Asian voices also want to see a year-round presence at the centre", not just in one event.

== Events ==
=== Moon Lantern Trail ===
An integral part of OzAsia Festival that celebrates the Mid-Autumn Festival, an official harvest festival traditionally celebrated by Chinese and Vietnamese people, has traditionally occurred as the opening event of the festival. The Moon Lantern Parade, a free public event, began after sunset, and was followed by fireworks over the River Torrens.

In 2021 the event was expanded and renamed the Moon Lantern Trail. The trail, which runs from the opening Thursday until the evening of the first Sunday of OzAsia, commences at Adelaide Festival Centre Precinct and includes a path to Pinky Flat, lit up by lanterns. During the day, there are many roving performances such as puppetry and music, including special activities for children.

=== Food ===
In 2015, Adelaide's Riverbank Precinct was transformed for the first time into a hawker-style market with Asian food, themed bars, roving entertainers, and free performances every night of the festival, known as the Adelaide Night Noodle Markets. It was the first time the Night Noodle Markets ran in South Australia, following successes in Brisbane, Sydney, and Melbourne.

In 2017, the team behind Adelaide Fringe's "Gluttony" venue hub created and presented The Lucky Dumpling Market for the 2017 OzAsia Festival, which was located on the Adelaide Riverbank Lawns beside the Riverbank Footbridge. The Lucky Dumpling Market showcased authentic Asian cuisine, market stalls, premium wines and beers, and played host to local and international musicians. Lucky Dumpling Market has continued to be presented by Gluttony each year, with the 2025 event being held in Elder Park.

=== Literature and ideas ===
For the first time in 2018, OzAsia Festival hosted the South Asian institution Jaipur Literature Festival, the world's largest free literary festival, outside of India, in an event called JLF Adelaide. The event was reprised in 2019.

In 2021, OzAsia Festival hosted "In Other Words", an in-person event that shifted to a predominantly digital focus due to COVID-19 restrictions.

In 2025, the literary component of OzAsia was dubbed "Weekend of Words", and ran from 7 to 9 November, hosted by Sami Shah.

=== Other events ===
OzAsia films have been shown at the Mercury Cinema in Morphett Street.

In 2016, OzAsia Festival presented a special outdoor live music concert series in the riverbank precinct's Elder Park to celebrate its 10-year anniversary. The free event ran for ten days and featured top international performers from across Asia.

== Awards and nominations ==
OzAsia Festival
Year	Award	Category	Work	Result	Ref.
2008	Hong Kong Australia Business Association (SA Chapter) Award	Importing of Services	Adelaide Festival Centre for OzAsia Festival	Won	
2008	Ruby Award	Best Community Event	Moon Lantern Festival	Won	
2009	Helpmann Award	Best Chamber Music Recital	Ecstatic Dances for OzAsia Festival (Gabriella Smart)	Won	
2009	Ruby Award	Best Event	OzAsia Festival	Won	
2010	Australia Business Arts Foundation Award	ABAF National Award for Partnership of the Year	Adelaide Festival Centre, shared with Santos, for OzAsia Festival	Won	
2010	Australia Business Arts Foundation Award	ABAF National Award for Australian ABAF Partnering	Adelaide Festival Centre, shared with Santos, for OzAsia Festival	Won	
2010	Australia Business Arts Foundation Award	ABAF State Award for South Australian ABAF Partnering	Adelaide Festival Centre, shared with Santos, for OzAsia Festival	Won	
2010	Australian Event Award	Australia's Most Exceptional Event	Adelaide Festival Centre, shared with Santos, for OzAsia Festival	Won	
2011	Governor's Multicultural Award	Arts and Culture	OzAsia Festival	Won	
2012	Hong Kong Australia Business Association (SA Chapter) Award	Contribution to Tourism, Hospitality or Recreation	Adelaide Festival Centre for OzAsia Festival	Won	
2013	Art Music Award	Excellence in Music Education	Adelaide Symphony Orchestra and OzAsia Festival	Won	
2013	Hong Kong Australia Business Association (SA Chapter) Award	Contribution to Tourism, Hospitality or Recreation	Adelaide Festival Centre for OzAsia Festival	Won	
2013	Hong Kong Australia Business Association National Award	Business Development	Adelaide Festival Centre for OzAsia Festival	Won	
2014	The Australia-China Achievement Award	Arts	Adelaide Festival Centre for OzAsia Festival	Nominated	
2014	Hong Kong Australia Business Association (SA Chapter) Award	Contribution to Tourism, Hospitality or Recreation	Adelaide Festival Centre for OzAsia Festival	Won	
2014	Governor's Multicultural Award	Arts and Culture Organisation	Adelaide Festival Centre for OzAsia Festival	Nominated	
2019	SA Tourism Awards	Best Major Festival or Event	Adelaide Festival Centre for OzAsia Festival	Won	
2019	Governor's Multicultural Awards	Arts and Culture Award	Adelaide Festival Centre for OzAsia Festival	Won	
