= Sean Riley (playwright) =

Australian writer

- Born: 1967 (age 58–59); Burnie, Tasmania, Australia
- Occupation: Playwright
- Writing career
- Notable work: Beautiful Words

Sean Riley is an Australian playwright.

== Early life ==
Riley was born in 1967 in Burnie, Tasmania.

== Works ==
In December 1991 he directed a production of his own play, Eat Me, for Unley Youth Theatre.

Beautiful Words was a commissioned work written over a four-year period from 2001, leading to a full production in Adelaide in May 2006. It is described as "an inter-related trilogy of plays which explores the refugee experience through the eyes of three separate children". Their stories of survival, span different times and places: Auschwitz, Afghanistan, and Australia. The first of these, Zugang was first performed as a play reading in October 2002 at Majestic Cinemas in New South Wales. It was again performed in February 2016 by SAYarts at the Goodwood Institute in Adelaide.

His play The Angel & the Red Priest was performed as part of the 2008 Adelaide Festival of Arts.

His work Warren was the last production due to be performed by Urban Myth Theatre Company (the renamed Unley Youth Theatre) in 2014, and when the company was dissolved, Riley was one of the co-founders of a new theatre collective, SAYarts, along with Urban Myth general manager Bec Pannell and others. SAYarts has staged performances in DreamBIG, AGSA Neo, WOMADelaide, as well as presenting several original shows each year.

Other plays written by Riley include The Sad Ballad of Penny Dreadful (presented by Windmill Performing Arts in January 2006), My Sister Violet (presented by the Urban Myth Theatre of Youth in 2005), The Last Acre (2003), and The Time of Ashes (2001).
