= Shmuel Gorr =

Israeli historian and genealogist (1931–1988)

Rabbi Shmuel Gorr (Hebrew: שמואל גור; September 22, 1931 – September 3, 1988) was an Australian and Israeli historian and genealogist, noted for compiling information about Jewish personal names.

== Biography ==
Shmuel Gorr was born in Melbourne, Australia to a Russian immigrant family. At the age of 15 he was sent to the Telz yeshiva, United States, later to the Gateshead yeshiva, England. After his studies he received rabbinic ordination. After his studies overseas he returned to Australia, where he studied history, art, and comparative religion and lectured on Jewish art at the University of Melbourne and the Monash University. In 1968 he emigrated to Israel and settled in Kiryat HaYovel, Jerusalem. Initially he worked for Encyclopedia Judaica.

Shmuel Gorr amassed a large archive of photographs of rabbis, and the work on it spakled his interest in genealogy, which resulted in his archive (donated to the National Library of Israel). He lectured for various organizations and conducted research commissioned for Yad Ben Zvi, Yad Vashem and other organizations.

He was director of the Jerusalem Institute of Jewish Genealogy.

In 1973, he served at the IDF during the Yom Kippur War

Shmuel Gorr was an observant Chabadnik.

== Notable works ==
- (With Chaim Freedman) Jewish personal names, 1992
- Popular Jewish (Hebrew) Boy Names
- Popular Jewish (Hebrew) Girl Names
