= Feast Festival =

Annual LGBT event in Adelaide, South Australia

Coordinates: 34°55′05″S 138°35′42″E

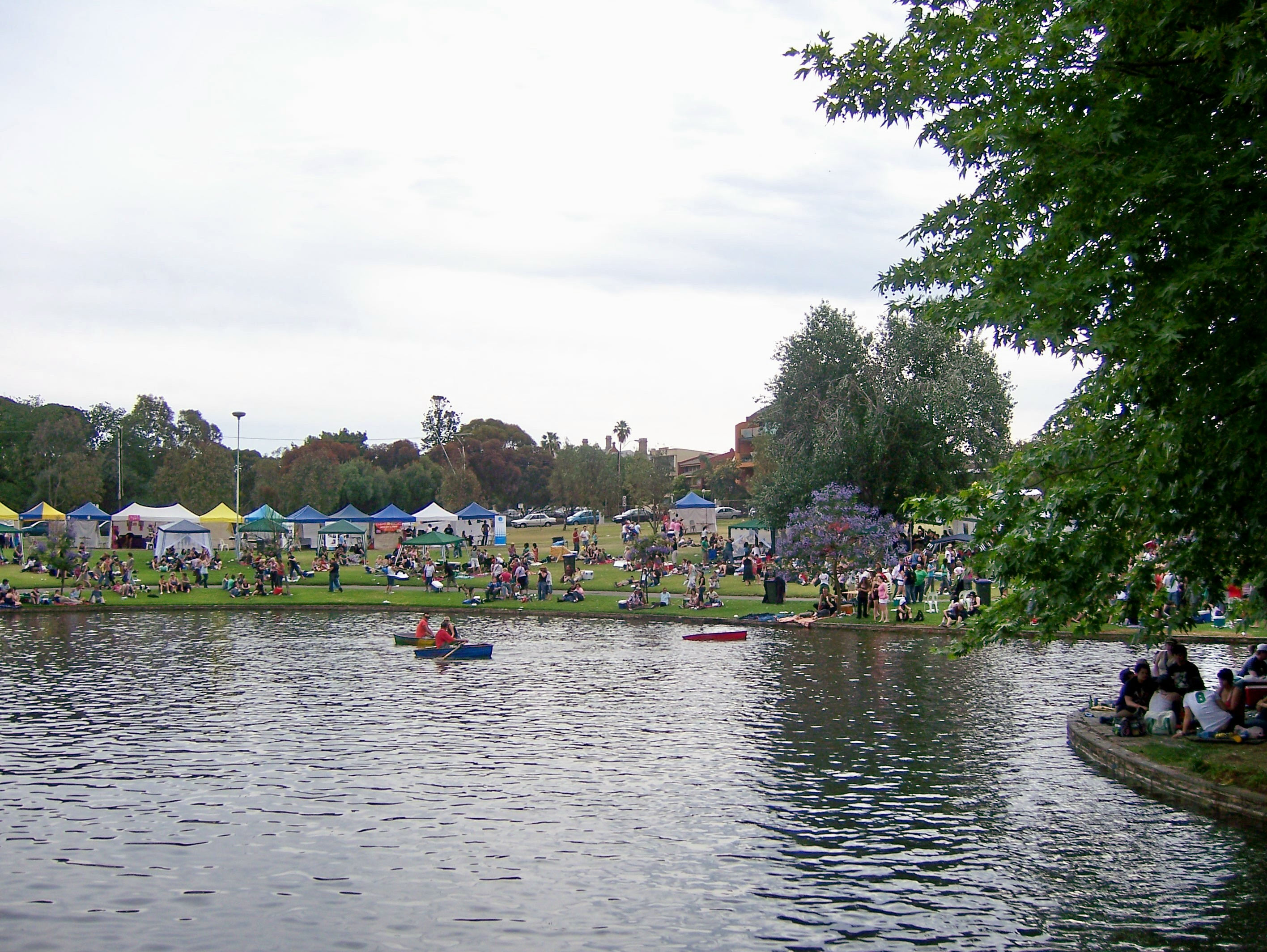
The 'Picnic in the Park', held in Rymill Park, is a major event of the Feast Festival, usually held at its conclusion.

Feast Festival is an LGBTQIA+ festival held annually in November in Adelaide, South Australia. The event is one of Australia's four major queer festivals, alongside Perth's Pride Festival, Melbourne's Midsumma and the Sydney Gay and Lesbian Mardi Gras.

== History ==
Feast was founded in 1997 (29 years ago) by a group of arts and community cultural workers. Margie Fischer, Damien Carey, Helen Bock, and Luke Cutler worked together to create a community arts festival for the lesbian and gay community in Adelaide. In 1999, cabaret theatre performer Paul Capsis performed at the festival's opening concert.

In November 2009, the lineup of singer/songwriters for Sing Out at the festival included Emily Davis, Vicki Bennett, and Ziggie Zertophf. In 2011 approximately 48,000 people attended Feast events, with another 40,000 tuning into the live radio broadcast from Picnic in the Park with Joy 94.9.

In 2016, Dannii Minogue was the headline act for the opening night street party.

A short documentary film was researched, created and exhibited as part of Feast’s 25th anniversary in 2022.

== Financial and leadership difficulties ==
Between 2013 and 2014 Feast Festival accumulated a significant financial deficit, and in 2015 the organisation moved from curated model and made its Artistic Director, Catherine Fitzgerald, redundant. The decision received criticisms, including from the festival co-founder Helen Bock. The festival was led by General Manager Cassandra Liebeknecht and the Chair of the Board, Joshua Rayner. In September 2016, Liebeknecht was suspended on full pay while the board investigated allegations of unprofessional conduct. She had been criticised for poor performance, including financial management and breaking relationships with local arts and queer community. Liebeknecht resigned before the investigation was completed

In 2016 the organisation was "bailed out" by Arts South Australia Executive Director Peter Louca following unreported losses.

Feast are founder members of Festivals Adelaide, launched in 2020 as an umbrella organisation to provide advocacy, policy and marketing for the festival sector.

== See also ==
- List of LGBT events
