= Adelaide Cabaret Festival =

Australian arts festival

Coordinates: 34°55′43″S 138°36′03″E

The Adelaide Cabaret Festival is an annual arts festival featuring cabaret held in the South Australian capital of Adelaide. It has been held in June each year since 2001, with the exception of 2020 owing to the COVID-19 pandemic in Australia, when an online event was presented on Facebook.

== History ==
Adelaide Cabaret Festival emerged during a period of change and uncertainty. During the late 1990s, the number of big stage musicals was in decline across the country. Frank Ford approached then Arts Minister, Diana Laidlaw, who committed funding to establish the first cabaret festival at the Adelaide Festival Centre.

The first festival took place in May 2001 and featured Australian jazz musician James Morrison, musical satirist Phil Scott, and Australian musical theatre star Caroline O'Connor (a late replacement for Nina Simone). The festival proved successful, both critically and commercially, and the state government committed to a further three years of funding. The second edition attracted 48,000 attendees. The inaugural festival director was Julia Holt, who remained in the position until 2008.

In 2020, owing to the COVID-19 pandemic, the festival was delivered via Facebook, dubbed Bite-Sized & Home Delivered, from 5 to 20 June.

In 2023, as part of the celebrations for the 50th anniversary of the Adelaide Festival Centre, the festival was curated by nine former artistic directors of the festival, dubbed "The Cabaret Collective", comprising Julia Holt, David Campbell, Lisa Campbell, Kate Ceberano, Eddie Perfect, Ali McGregor, Julia Zemiro, Alan Cumming and Tina Arena.

== Description ==
The festival starts on the Friday of the Queen's Birthday long weekend each June and runs for about two weeks, hosted by the Adelaide Festival Centre. It is the biggest cabaret festival in the world.

== Festival directors ==
- Julia Holt (2001–2008)
- David Campbell (2009–2011)
- Kate Ceberano (2012–2014)
- Barry Humphries (2015)
- Ali McGregor and Eddie Perfect (2016–2017)
- Ali McGregor (2018)
- Julia Zemiro (2019–2020)
- Alan Cumming (2021)
- Tina Arena (2022)
- Alex Sinclair (2023)
- Virginia Gay (2024–5)
- Reuben Kaye (2026)

== Adelaide Cabaret Fringe Festival ==
The Adelaide Cabaret Fringe Festival, run as a separate event, which has had four separate incarnations since 2001. Frank Ford (1935-2018), who had earlier founded the Adelaide Fringe and later the Adelaide Cabaret Festival, created the first Cabaret Fringe Festival in 2001, as "a non-curated, open-access, affordably-priced experimental platform". This was strongly supported by Arts Minister Di Laidlaw. The Fringe event took place in West End venues, initially assisted by Arts SA through the Adelaide Festival Centre Trust (AFCT), and run alongside the main event.

After the AFCT ceased funding the Cabaret Fringe in 2003, it was taken up by Torsten Meyer, who ran it at his Weimar Room on Hindley Street. In 2008, brothers Paul and Adam Boylon, along with Jay Robinson, implemented a third version of the Cabaret Fringe, beginning at La Bohème cabaret bar. This expanded to other venues, growing each year, until La Bohème closed in early 2019. The Boylons, along with Greg Mackie, established a board to run the Cabaret Fringe in its fourth incarnation.

As of 2026 the Adelaide Cabaret Fringe Festival is run by the Cabaret Fringe Association Inc., which was established in 2019. The board is headed by Shelley Dunstone.
