= Carclew (youth arts centre) =

Youth arts centre in Adelaide, Australia

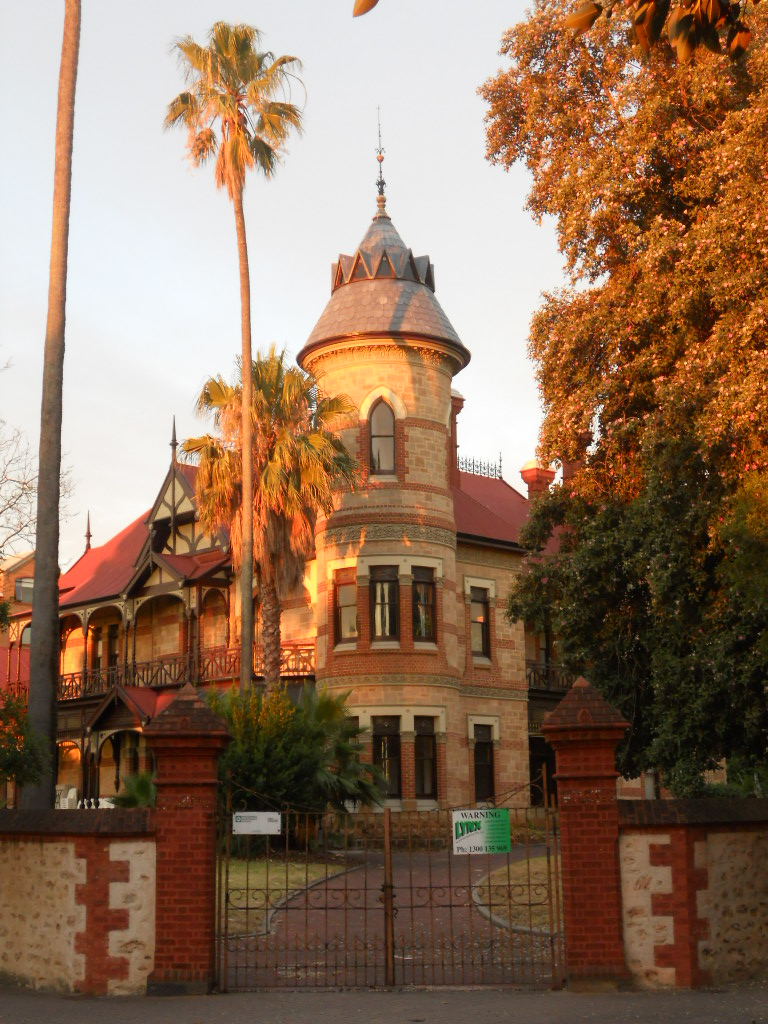
Carclew, North Adelaide in 2011

Carclew is an Australian youth arts centre based in Adelaide, South Australia. It was founded in 1971 as the South Australian Performing Arts Centre, with its name changed on several occasions to variations of Carclew Youth Performing Arts Centre, until it was renamed to simply Carclew in 2013. Its name is derived from the historic mansion North Adelaide in which it is based, also known as Carclew.

As of 2024 Marjorie Fitz-Gerald, an arts philanthropist who was instrumental in the establishment of Carclew, is patron of Carclew.

== History ==
In 1971 Premier Don Dunstan created the South Australian Performing Arts Centre for Young People, which was incorporated in 1972. Based at the historic home known as Carclew in North Adelaide, the centre was renamed the Carclew Youth Arts Centre in 1976. Its mandate was changed in 1982 to focus on performing arts, and the name was changed to the Carclew Youth Performing Arts Centre.

From late 1988, the mandate was widened to include a broader range of the arts, and to include people up to 26 years old and the name changed back to Carclew Youth Arts Centre to reflect this in March 1991. In 2009 the name again changed, this time to Carclew Youth Arts, and finally to Carclew in 2013.

Carclew is unique in South Australia as a multi-art-form centre for young people. It runs programs, workshops, projects and funding opportunities, including scholarships, project grants and mentoring opportunities. It also provides connections with schools and other arts organisations.

In February 2019, a new program by Creative Consultants was launched through Carclew, to help young artists to earn a stable income over the course of their careers. Also in 2019, the City of Adelaide is collaborating with Carclew to deliver the "Emerging Curator Program", a six-month engagement in which three aspiring curators are supported in their professional development.

== Governance ==
=== History ===
The centre was managed by the Youth Performing Arts Council from 1980, which was established specifically to manage Carclew. After a need for an organisation with a broader focus to manage youth arts policy and programs, the South Australian Youth Arts Board was created and took over in November 1988, at which time the centre's focus was also expanded.

Reporting to the Minister for the Arts, Carclew's funding was the responsibility of Arts South Australia until 2018, when the position of Arts Minister was abolished and it was moved, along with the History of South Australia, Patch Theatre Company and Windmill Theatre Company, to the Department of Education.

In July 2019, the state budget slashed funding to the History Trust, Carclew and Windmill, as part of "operational efficiency" cuts.

In October 2024, a new four-year strategic plan was published, under CEO Mimi Crowe. At the same time, Megan Antcliff was announced as new chair, after former chair Rachel Healy had resigned after being appointed CEO of the Queensland Performing Arts Centre.

=== Today ===
As of October 2024, Megan Antcliff is chair of the board and Mimi Crowe is CEO of Carclew.

Marjorie Fitz-Gerald, an arts philanthropist who was instrumental in the establishment of Carclew, is patron.

== Awards and scholarships ==
From 2002 or earlier until 2016, in some years Carclew has offered awards and scholarships to young creatives, including:

- Colin Thiele Scholarship for Creative Writing (after Colin Thiele)
- Carclew Film and New Media Scholarship, previously BHP Billiton Scholarship for Film and New Media
- Dame Ruby Litchfield Scholarship for Performing Arts (after Ruby Litchfield)
- Ruth Tuck Scholarship for Visual Arts (after Ruth Tuck)

The Dame Ruby Litchfield Scholarship for Performing Arts was established by the state government in 1993.

As of 2024 the above awards are no longer offered, but there are various other fellowships, awards and grants offered.

In 2015, and continuing as of 2024, Carclew offered the Independent Arts Foundation Franz Kempf Printmaker Award (after Franz Kempf).

=== Past winners ===
1993:

- Inaugural Dame Ruby Litchfield Scholarship for Performing Arts – Stephen Noonan

2002:

- Colin Thiele Scholarship – Finegan Kruckemeyer and Samantha Schulz

2005:

- Colin Thiele Creative Writing Scholarship – Jason Fischer
- Dame Ruby Litchfield Scholarship for Performing Arts – Daniel Daw, dancer

2009:

- Dame Ruby Litchfield Scholarship for Performing Arts – Matthew Sheens

2011:

- Dame Ruby Litchfield Scholarship for Performing Arts – Jody Fisher, classical guitarist

2012:

- Colin Thiele Creative Writing Scholarship – Phillip Kavanagh
- Inaugural BHP Billiton Scholarship for Film and New Media – Michael Richards, animation
- Ruth Tuck Scholarship for Visual Arts – Amy Joy Watson
- Dame Ruby Litchfield Scholarship for Performing Arts - Robert MacFarlane

2013:

- Dame Ruby Litchfield Scholarship for Performing Arts – Quentin Angus, jazz guitarist

2014:

- Colin Thiele Creative Writing Scholarship – Matt Vesely, filmmaker (Monolith)

2015:

- Colin Thiele Creative Writing Scholarship – Sarah Gates

2016:

- Colin Thiele Creative Writing Scholarship – Georgina Chadderton
- Carclew Film and New Media Scholarship – Debra Liang
- Dame Ruby Litchfield Scholarship for Performing Arts – Tilda Cobham-Hervey
- Ruth Tuck Scholarship for Visual Arts – Julia McInerney
