= Country Arts SA =

Country Arts SA is statutory corporation created by the South Australian government under the provisions of the South Australian Country Arts Trust Act (1992), for the purpose of delivering arts to regional South Australia. Responsibility for the organisation previously rested with Arts South Australia, but since late 2018 has come under the Department of the Premier and Cabinet.

== History ==
The organisation was created as a statutory body by the South Australian Country Arts Trust Act (1992) and grew into being during Diana Laidlaw's term as Minister for the Arts.

In 2010, Country Arts SA established an Aboriginal Arts and Cultural Engagement program, and in 2018 it published its second "Stretch" Reconciliation Action Plan, Reconciliation Plan 2018–2020, vowing to "embed principles of self-determination to ensure Aboriginal and Torres Strait Islander people have a voice and play a crucial part in making decisions on all aspects of Country Arts SA".

In 2018, under CEO Steve Saffell, it celebrated its 25th anniversary, announcing a programme which would include a number of shows to be presented in Port Lincoln.

== Description ==
The main aim of the organisation is to ensure that regional and remote communities in South Australia have access to the visual and performing arts as well as cultural development opportunities, so it both presents many types of artistic expression, through performance and exhibitions, as well as supporting local artists and performers.

As of 2018, the organisation had a staff of 167 people, most of whom live and work in regional South Australia and of whom seven were Aboriginal Australians.

=== Locations ===
As of 2019, Country Arts SA's headquarters is in Port Adelaide, with regional centres at Noarlunga Centre (the Hopgood Theatre), Whyalla (Middleback Arts Centre), Port Pirie (Northern Festival Centre), Renmark (Chaffey Theatre) and Berri (River Lands Gallery).

== Major works ==
Kumarangk, a major theatre project written by Wotjobaluk and Ngarrindjeri playwright and screenwriter Tracey Rigney and directed by Glenn Shea and produced by Country Arts SA, was funded in the first round of the Creative Futures Fund in July 2025. It tells the story of the women who led community resistance against the construction of Hindmarsh Island Bridge, and is guided by the cultural stewardship of the women who were involved at the time. There will be a performance on Country, along with an exhibition and a documentary film.

== See also ==
- Culture of Australia
