= Finegan Kruckemeyer =

Australian playwright

- Born: 1981 (age 44–45); County Cork, Ireland
- Occupation: Playwright
- Years active: 2004–Present

Finegan Kruckemeyer (born 1981) is an Australian playwright.

== Early life ==
Kruckemeyer was born in 1981 in Cork, Ireland, of a German father and Irish mother. The family moved to Adelaide, South Australia when Finegan was eight years old, and he attended Unley Primary School and Glenunga High School and became involved with Unley Youth Theatre.

== Career ==
Kruckemeyer honed his skills working with Independent Theatre and Brink Productions in Adelaide, before moving to Tasmania in his mid-twenties to pursue a career as a playwright.

His work has been performed in over 200 international festivals; all Australian states and territories; eight US national tours; five UK national tours; and at venues including the Sydney Opera House (six works), New York’s New Victory Theater (three works), Edinburgh’s Imaginate Festival (three works), Dublin’s Abbey Theatre, Shanghai’s Malan Flower Theatre, and Washington, D.C.’s Kennedy Center.

== Recognition and awards ==
Kruckemeyer was awarded the Colin Thiele Scholarship for Creative Writing in 2002, the Jill Blewett's Playwright's Award in 2006, and the Rodney Seaborn Playwrights Award in 2010.

He was an inaugural recipient of the Sidney Myer Creative Fellowship in 2011, an award of A$160,000 given to mid-career creatives and thought leaders.

In 2012, he won the Helpmann Award for Children's Theatre, and he has received seven AWGIE Awards.

He was the recipient of the 2015 David Williamson Prize for Excellence in Australian Playwrighting (a category in the AWGIEs).

== Other roles ==
Finegan has been a speaker at the Ubud Writers Festival in Bali, Indonesia, the Edinburgh International Children’s Theatre Festival (Scotland), TYA USA National Conference, and the ITYARN Conference (Argentina), among others. He has delivered papers or sat on panels at conferences/festivals in nine countries, with papers published.

He was one of 21 selected worldwide for the ASSITEJ Next Generation (young leaders in children’s theatre), and has sat on numerous arts boards including the Australian Script Centre and Tasmanian Arts Advisory Board, Arts Tasmania’s Assistance to Individuals, Tas Literary Awards and Artsbridge panels, and the Story Island Project board (promoting youth literacy and empowerment through storytelling with marginalised young people).

== Works ==
=== Plays ===
- Andrew Corder Thinks Twice
- At Sea, Staring Up
- Bastien Und Bastienne (Adapted Recitativo)
- Big Smoke
- Boats
- Books And Bites
- The Boy at the Edge of Everything
- The Boy With The Longest Shadow
- Boys Will Be Boys
- The Company I Keep
- Con Artists
- Cue the Chorus: A Youth Presumed
- Dancing Back Home
- Dinner
- Drums In The Night (Translation)
- Escape From Peligro Island
- Everything They Ever Said With Fingers Crossed Behind Their Backs
- The Falling Room And The Flying Room
- Four On A Couch
- The Grumpiest Boy in the World
- The Girl Who Forgot To Sing Badly
- Heartburn Hotel (Adaptation)
- Helena And The Journey Of The Hello
- Hibernation
- The Hip-Hop Monologues
- The Holey Book
- The House That Jack Filled
- Human Geography
- If I Jumped, I'd Fly
- If Only the Lonely Were Home
- I'll Show You Yours (Formerly: South Of The Border)
- Love
- Man Covets Bird
- The Minister's Children
- Moving Mountains
- My Heart is a Hall
- My Mother Told Me Not To Stare
- My Robot
- Night Places
- Plays For My Girlfriend
- Positions Vacant
- Queen Of The Snakepit
- Ruby Bruise
- Ruby Bruised
- The Second Echo Ensemble
- Shadow Dreams
- She Beside Me, Sitting
- She Would Walk the Sky
- Simon's Final Sound
- Smackbeth
- Snapshot
- The Snow
- Suzette Who Set to Sea
- Sylvia South and the Word Catcher
- This Girl Laughs, This Girl Cries, This Girl Does Nothing
- This Much Of Me
- This Uncharted Hour
- Those Who Fall in Love Like Anchors Dropped Upon the Ocean Floor
- Tough Beauty
- The Tragical Life Of Cheeseboy
- Trouble On Planet Earth
- The Violent Outburst That Drew Me To You
- We're All Going To Die Of Cancer Anyway
- When The Penny Drops
- When The Pictures Came
- When We Lived In Uncle's Hat
- Wolf

=== Novels ===
- The End and Everything Before It
