= Carclew, North Adelaide =

House in North Adelaide, South Australia

Carclew
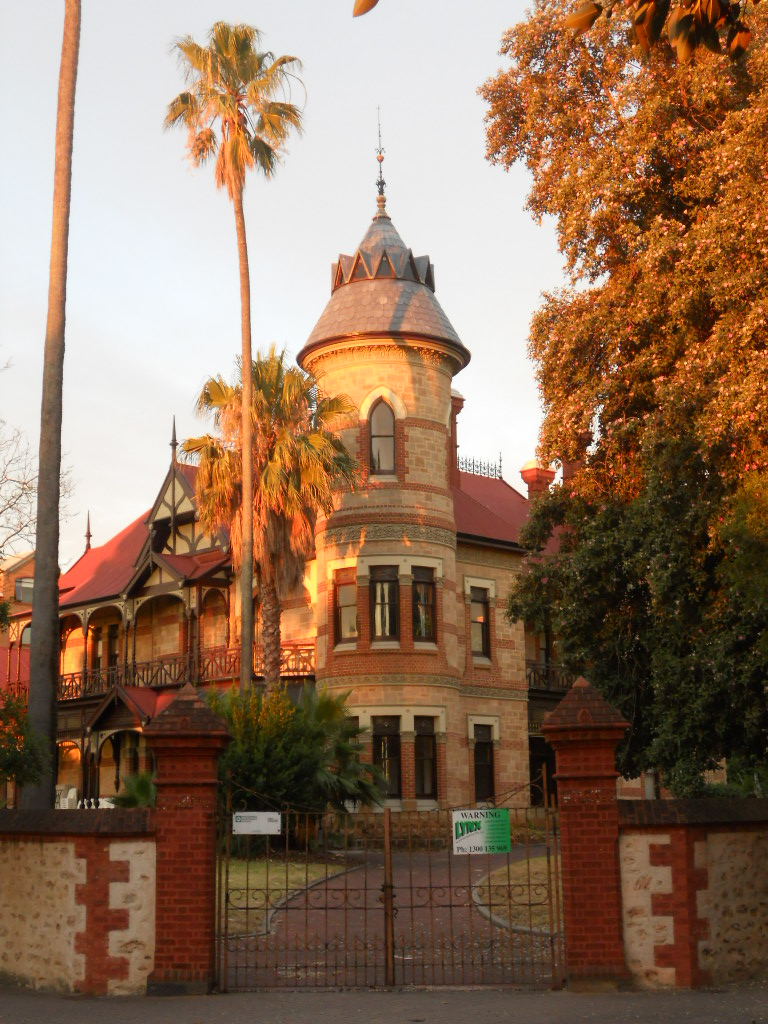
- Carclew, 2011

- Location within Australia

General information
- Location: North Adelaide, Australia
- Coordinates: 34°54′44″S 138°35′34″E
- Construction started: 1897

Height
- Architectural: Federation style

Carclew is a Federation style mansion built in 1897, located in the suburb of North Adelaide, overlooking the Adelaide city centre from Montefiore Hill, in Adelaide, South Australia, Australia. The building is known for being the premises of the cultural organisation dedicated to artistic development of young people, now known simply as Carclew, which has been housed in the building since 1971.

== History ==
The site was originally sold in the first Adelaide land sale of 1837, purchased by George Curtis for 12 shillings. In 1861 the site contained a simple two-storey brick dwelling, a wall surrounding the house and a stable. It was purchased by a stockbroker James Chambers in 1861, who in the same year sponsored the expedition of John McDouall Stuart, which was launched from the site. A plaque on the property's surrounding wall commemorates the event. The expedition was the first successful European crossing of the continent, but James Chambers died at the property before Stuart's return.

In 1862 the site was purchased by businessman, politician and philanthropist Hugh Robert Dixson (later Sir Hugh Robert Denison), who demolished the existing home, leaving only the wall surrounding the property and the stable. Dixson erected the current grander building in 1897 (or 1901?) and called it "Stalheim" (perhaps after the town in Norway).

In 1908, the building was sold to Sir John Langdon Bonython, editor of The Advertiser and member of the first Parliament of Australia. Bonython renamed the building "Carclew" after the area in Cornwall where his ancestors had lived. The property remained in the Bonython family until 1965, when it was purchased by the Adelaide City Council.

After a 2006 architects' report recommending maintenance work on the structure of the building, the Government of South Australia undertook the construction work, which was completed in October 2009.

== Architecture ==
The house was designed by John Quintin Bruce, a prominent Adelaide architect, who also designed Electra House in King William Street and the Freemasons Hall on North Terrace.

The building is an architecturally significant Federation-style mansion, and stands in a prominent position next to Light's Vision. The two-storey building is constructed of sandstone, rusticated brick quoins and has cement decoration, with timber balconies and verandahs, and an iron roof, except for that of the three-storey tower, which is made of slate. There is ornate woodwork on the gables.

The decorated archway at the main entrance leads to an entrance hall. From there, the main staircase leads upstairs to what were once the family quarters. The ground floor included a ballroom, morning room, parlour, kitchen scullery, and conservatory. There was a room for the servants with a separate entrance. The single-storey library was added in 1908.

== Youth arts centre ==
In 1971 Premier Don Dunstan created the South Australian Performing Arts Centre for Young People. It has since had several name changes, since 2013 being known simply as Carclew. Carclew runs programs, workshops, projects, and funding opportunities, including scholarships, project grants, and mentoring opportunities for young people. It is funded by the South Australian Government.
