= Roz Hervey =

Australian dancer (1965/1966–2024)

- Born: 1965 or 1966; Australia
- Died: 8 November 2024 (aged 58)
- Occupations: Dancer, choreographer, theatre director, artistic director
- Years active: 1987–2024
- Known for: Co-founder and associate artist at Force Majeure; Creative director at Restless Dance Theatre

Roz Hervey (1965 or 1966 – 8 November 2024) was an Australian dancer, choreographer, director and theatrical producer. She was known for roles as co-founder of and associate artist with Sydney dance-theatre company Force Majeure, as director of the Adelaide Fringe parade from 2013 until 2016, and finally, from around 2013, as creative director of Restless Dance Theatre in Adelaide, South Australia. She also worked with many other theatre and dance companies, as well as festivals and other events.

== Early life and education ==
Roz Hervey was born in 1965 or 1966, and was a dance graduate of the Centre for the Performing Arts in Adelaide.

In March 1980, Hervey appeared in youth theatre production Filthy Children, which was presented as part of the Adelaide Festival.

== Career ==
Hervey worked as a dancer, choreographer, director, and producer.

=== Dance, choreography, and theatre direction ===
In April 1987, Hervey performed in Waltz with the newly-formed theatre group The Sydney Front, a work composed by Sarah de Jong and directed by Nigel Kellaway and performed at the Performance Space in Redfern, Sydney.

She co-founded Force Majeure, along with Kate Champion and Geoff Cobham, in 2002. In that year she performed in one of their major works, created by Champion, called Same, same But Different, along with Nathan Page, Ben Winspear, and others. The work was performed at Sydney Festival, Brisbane Festival, Sydney Opera House, and the Melbourne Festival. She was associate director on Force Majeure's Never Did Me Any Harm, a collaboration with Sydney Theatre Company, which premiered at the Sydney Festival in 2012, played at the Adelaide Festival in the same year, and in 2016 toured to regional New South Wales, Tasmania, and Victoria. She worked at the company for over ten years as associate artist.

As a dancer, Hervey worked with many companies, including One Extra Company, The Sydney Front, Dancenorth, Theatre of Image, Sue Healey, Meryl Tankard Company, DV8, and Force Majeure, touring extensively with the groups in Australia and internationally.

As a choreographer, she worked for South Australian companies such as Brink Productions, Slingsby, Patch Theatre Company, and Theatre Republic. For Theatre Republic, she was movement choreographer on its inaugural production, LINES, written by British playwright Pamela Carter and presented at the Bakehouse Theatre in October–November 2018.

For Patch, she co-created and directed the award-winning Me and My Shadow, and Zooom. Me and My Shadow was first performed at The Forge at Marryatville High School in May 2010, and over the following decade was presented around Australia as well as in the United States. It toured regional SA in 2020. Zooom has toured Australia, Canada, and the US since premiering at the Space Theatre in July–August 2019. It was also performed at the DreamBIG Festival in May 2021, and won the 2021 Ruby Award for Best Work, Event or Project for Young People.

=== Restless Dance Theatre ===
From around 2013 until her death, Hervey was creative producer for Restless Dance Theatre, a well-known dance company that employs artists with and without disability. She was concept creator and dramaturg on the company's show Private View for the 2024 Adelaide Festival.

=== Events ===
Hervey worked as an event co-ordinator for the 2000 opening night concert as well of the Adelaide Festival, as well as the late-night festival club, and for the 2001 Come Out Festival opening and parade. She also directed the Adelaide Fringe parade from 2013 until 2016.

She was artistic director for SA day 1999, (Note: What the source says, but no corroboration of such a day.) and of "Bundaleer Weekend Forest Walks", part of the 2003 Bundaleer Weekend in the Mid North of the state. This involved directing and choreographing 30 performances of music, poetry, theatre, acrobatics, sport, and dance in the forest, for visitors to explore on the Sunday afternoon of the weekend.

Hervey co-directed the Come Out Festival opening in 2005.

She was creative producer/event director on the 2024 History Festival, run by the History Trust of South Australia.

== Other activities ==
Hervey taught movement at Flinders Drama Centre.

She was a board member of the women's arts organisation Vitalstatistix at Port Adelaide. She was also a board member at Theatre Republic until her resignation in November 2022.

== Recognition and awards ==
- 2002: Ausdance "Outstanding performance by a female dancer" award, for her performance in Force Majeure's Same But Different, created by Kate Champion.

== Personal life ==
Hervey's life partner was Patch Theatre's artistic director Geoff Cobham ("Cobby"), after meeting at the 1986 Adelaide Festival, where they were both working for One Extra Dance Theatre, who were on tour from Sydney. Their children are actress Tilda Cobham-Hervey and her brother Huey.

She has been quoted as often expressing variations on the following beliefs and principles:

I'm a huge believer in the power of the arts to change perspectives. I have always used my art to challenge, and ignite audience discussion. I have seen how the arts has changed people.

I am drawn to artists exploring the human condition who are not afraid of honesty. Authenticity is really important to me.

== Later life, death, and legacy ==
Hervey was diagnosed with motor neurone disease in late 2022. She received support from the NDIS, and chose to live life to the fullest, to continue to work, have holidays with family, and spend time with those she loved.

Hervey chose to use the state's voluntary assisted dying (VAD) scheme, which had come into effect in January 2023. After her diagnosis, from before she was given approval to use VAD, per Harvey's request, her daughter Tilda documented much of her last two years of life on film, using interviews in which she related events in her life and her views. Hervey wanted to raise awareness for VAD and raise death literacy, having become an ardent advocate for VAD, as did her family, with her husband and children adopting Hervey's "seize the day" attitude to living each day full of joy. They travelled the world, used black humour, and discussed planning Hervey's death. Hervey was only given final approval for VAD after her lungs showed signs of losing function. The family spent their last day out together at McLaren Vale.

She died on 8 November 2024, at the age of 58, leaving a farewell letter which included the quote from Dr Seuss: "Don't cry because it’s over, smile because it happened".

Many tributes flowed in after her death from companies and people she had worked with, recognising her contribution to the arts in Australia and her personal qualities such as kindness and integrity, that made her so well-liked. Restless Dance Theatre posted on social media Restless Dance Theatre called her their "amazing creative producer extraordinaire", saying that she had continued working incredibly hard even after her MND diagnosis, and also said later "Her influence lifted Restless Dance Theatre to new heights". Creative Australia's head of dance Sarah Greentree said Hervey "was a powerhouse of Australian dance who wowed audiences around the world". She was also acknowledged in the SA Parliament by Arts Minister Andrea Michaels on 13 November 2024.

On 16 August 2026, her story, including footage shot by Tilda, was screened on Australian Story on ABC Television, titled "The Final Act". It was also made available on YouTube.
