= Tilda Cobham-Hervey =

Australian actress (born 1994)

- Born: 4 September 1994 (age 32); Adelaide, South Australia
- Occupation: Actress
- Years active: 2013–present
- Partner: Dev Patel (2017–present)

Tilda Cobham-Hervey (born 4 September 1994) is an Australian actress. She made her film debut in 52 Tuesdays, a critically acclaimed independent film directed by Sophie Hyde, and has also appeared on stage. She appeared in the 2018 film Hotel Mumbai, and starred as feminist icon Helen Reddy in the 2019 biopic I Am Woman. In 2023 she starred in the Amazon Prime TV series The Lost Flowers of Alice Hart. As of 2025 she is making a feature film, as writer, director, producer, and actor, called It's All Going Very Well....

== Early life, education, and physical theatre ==
Cobham-Hervey was born on 4 September 1994 in Adelaide, South Australia. Her father is set and lighting designer and event director Geoff Cobham, and her mother was Roz Hervey, a former dancer and dance teacher, later creative director of Restless Dance Theatre, who died in November 2024.

The family travelled a lot, sometimes "living backstage in theatres". Starting from the age of nine, Tilda trained and performed in the Adelaide-based youth circus performance troupe Cirkidz for seven years, and was involved in five major productions. Her specialities were hula hoop, trapeze, and acrobatic pitching, but the emphasis was theatrical, and the focus was on storytelling.

She attended Marryatville High School.

Cobham-Hervey performed with Force Majeure in The Age I’m In, a show which was part of the 2008 Sydney and Adelaide Festivals, toured to 17 regional cities in Australia, and also toured to Ireland, Canada, and Korea.

In 2009, Cobham-Hervey became a founding member of an Adelaide circus group called Gravity and Other Myths, where she co-devised a show called Freefall. The troupe won the Adelaide Fringe's "Best Circus" award in 2010, the festival's Tour Ready award in 2011 and later that year won "Best Circus" in the Melbourne Fringe Festival, and she won the festival's award for "Best Emerging Circus/Physical Theatre Performer" in 2011.

== Career ==
After tagging along to an open audition with friends, Cobham-Hervey won the lead role of Billie in Closer Productions' feature film 52 Tuesdays, which was filmed on one day each week between August 2011 and August 2012. After 52 Tuesdays screened at the Sundance Film Festival, she was signed by Creative Artists Agency (CAA), a major talent agency in the United States, and by United Management in Australia.

In 2012, Cobham-Hervey played the supporting role in Projector Films' feature One Eyed Girl. In 2013 she created and performed the front-of-house entertainment at the Adelaide Festival club, Barrio, and in 2014, starred in the "Find Wonderful" television commercial for the re-launch of the Myer brand, filmed in New Zealand over three days.

In 2016, Cobham-Hervey appeared in her first play as Rosie Price in Things I Know To be True, which was written by Andrew Bovell for a co-production between State Theatre Company of South Australia and UK's Frantic Assembly. She played the role of Kitty in the six-part TV series Fucking Adelaide, directed by Sophie Hyde, which premiered at the Adelaide Film Festival in October 2017 and screened on ABC national television as well as iview from 2018.

Cobham-Hervey's directorial debut, a short film commissioned by the ABC and Screen Australia as part of the ABC ME Girls Initiative, premiered simultaneously at the 2017 Adelaide Film Festival and on ABC ME on 11 October 2017, the UN's International Day of the Girl. Made by Sophie Hyde's Closer Productions in Adelaide, A Field Guide to Being a 12-Year-Old Girl was awarded the Crystal Bear for Best Short Film by the Youth Jury of the 68th Berlin International Film Festival's Generation KPlus Section in February 2018.

In 2019 Cobham-Hervey played the role of Nanny Sally in the major film Hotel Mumbai. That same year, she also starred as the lead role of Melinda in the American indie film, Burn, opposite Josh Hutcherson.

In December 2017, she was cast in the lead role as Australian singer Helen Reddy in Australian film-maker Unjoo Moon's bio-pic I Am Woman. Filmed in Australia, Los Angeles, and New York City in late 2018, the film premiered at the Toronto Film Festival in 2019. Her performance was lauded by The Hollywood Reporter, describing it as a "breakout performance".

Cobham-Hervey and Dev Patel co-wrote and co-directed a short film, Roborovski, about a hamster, which premiered at Flickerfest in Sydney in January 2020. The film won three prizes at the Rencontres Internationales du Cinéma des Antipodes (Antipodean Film Festival) at Saint Tropez, France, in 2021: Australian Short Film Today; the Nicholas Baudin Prize; and the Audience Award.

In 2021, Cobham-Hervey devised an interactive theatre piece entitled Two Strangers Walk into a Bar which was premiered in the Adelaide Fringe and had a later season at MOD., a South Australian "futuristic museum of discovery". By December 2021 she had relocated back to Australia, after around four years in Los Angeles, to film The Lost Flowers of Alice Hart.

In September 2023, she took the main role as Esme Nicoll in the stage adaptation of Pip Williams' novel The Dictionary of Lost Words, co-produced by the State Theatre Company South Australia and Sydney Theatre Company. The play, written by playwright Verity Laughton, premiered at the Dunstan Playhouse in Adelaide, before moving to the Sydney Opera House. In late 2024 she was cast in the Netflix series Apple Cider Vinegar.

In 2025 Cobham-Hervey wrote and directed the film initially titled It's All Going Very Well No Problems At All, later shortened to It's All Going Very Well..., in which she also stars, in Adelaide. The film was completed by April 2026, and is due to be released as part of the Adelaide Film Festival. She plays one of the two lead roles in the Australian drama film Alphabet Lane, directed by James Litchfield, to be released in Australian cinemas on 23 April 2026. It's all going very well was co-produced by herself, Liam Heyen, Dev Patel, Jomon Thomas, and Alexander Rodnyansky, and also stars Jonathan Pryce, Roxie Mohebbi, and Chris Alosio. It will have its world premiere on 13 March 2027 at the Capri Theatre in Adelaide, as part of the Adelaide Film Festival.

== Personal life ==
In March 2017, Cobham-Hervey's relationship with British actor Dev Patel became public. They had met nine months earlier on the set of Hotel Mumbai. In April 2022 they moved to Adelaide. The couple posed for photographs together for the first time on the red carpet at the Sydney premiere of Patel's debut feature as a director, Monkey Man, on 2 April 2024.

Cobham-Hervey's mother, Roz Hervey, died in 2024 at the age of 58 using the state laws enabling voluntary assisted dying, as she had been diagnosed with motor neurone disease. Per request of Roz, the family documented her last two years on film up to her last day, to raise awareness for VAD and raise death literacy. Tilda had begun a creative project about grief several months earlier, and for this new project, she interviewed her mother and documented her life story on video. The whole family took part (including brother Huey and father Geoff Cobham), following Roz' wish that they "find the joy in every day", and they filmed the last two years of Roz' life. A documentary about their project was screened on ABC TV's Australian Story, titled "The Final Act", also made available on YouTube, in August 2026.

== Awards and nominations ==
=== Circus and physical theatre ===
| Year | Award | Category | Work | Result | Ref. |
|---|---|---|---|---|---|
| 2010 | Adelaide Fringe Award | AFF Award for Best Circus | Freefall | Won | |
| 2011 | Adelaide Fringe Award | AFF Tour Ready Award | Freefall | Won | |
| 2011 | Melbourne Fringe Festival Award | MFF Award for Best Circus | Freefall | Won | |
| 2011 | Melbourne Fringe Festival Award | MFF Award for Best Emerging Circus/Physical Theatre Performer | Freefall | Won | |

=== Film and television ===
Acting awards

| Year | Award | Category | Work | Result | Ref. |
|---|---|---|---|---|---|
| 2015 | Australian Film Critics Association Awards | Best Actress | 52 Tuesdays | Nominated | |
| 2015 | Film Critics Circle of Australia Awards | Best Performance by a Young Actor | 52 Tuesdays | Nominated | |
| 2017 | Silver Logie award | Graham Kennedy Award for Most Outstanding Newcomer | The Kettering Incident | Nominated | |
| 2018 | 68th Berlin International Film Festival | Crystal Bear for Best Short Film, Generation KPlus Section | A Field Guide to Being a 12-Year-Old Girl | Won | As writer and director. |
| 2019 | 9th AACTA Awards | AACTA Award for Best Actress in a Supporting Role | Hotel Mumbai | Nominated | |
| 2020 | 10th AACTA Awards | AACTA Award for Best Actress in a Leading Role | I Am Woman | Nominated | |

Directing awards

Roborovski won three prizes at the Rencontres Internationales du Cinéma des Antipodes in 2021: Australian Short Film Today; the Nicholas Baudin Prize; and the Audience Award.

=== Stage (theatre) ===
| Year | Award | Category | Work | Result | Ref. |
|---|---|---|---|---|---|
| 2017 | Helpmann Awards | Best Female Actor in a Supporting Role in a Play | Rosie Price in Things I Know to Be True | Nominated | |
| 2019 | South Australian Ruby Awards | Frank Ford Memorial Young Achiever Award | N/A | Won | |

== Filmography ==
=== Film ===
| Year | Title | Role |
|---|---|---|
| 2013 | 52 Tuesdays | Billie |
| 2013 | One Eyed Girl | Grace |
| 2014 | Marcia & The Shark | Marcia |
| 2015 | Girl Asleep | Huldra |
| 2016 | The Suitor | Charlotte |
| 2018 | Hotel Mumbai | Sally |
| 2019 | Burn | Melinda |
| 2019 | I Am Woman | Helen Reddy |
| 2021 | Flinch | Mia Rose |
| 2021 | Lone Wolf | Winnie |
| 2024 | Young Woman and the Sea | Margaret Ederle |
| 2025 | Jimpa | |
| TBA | It's All Going Very Well No Problems At All | |

=== Television ===
| Year | Title | Role | Notes |
|---|---|---|---|
| 2014 | Sundance Dispatch: 52 Tuesdays | Herself | |
| 2014 | How We Make Movies | Herself | |
| 2015 | The Kettering Incident | Eliza Grayson | 8 episodes |
| 2016 | Barracuda | Emma Taylor | 3 episodes |
| 2017 | Fucking Adelaide | Kitty | 6 episodes |
| 2023 | The Lost Flowers of Alice Hart | Agnes Hart | 7 episodes |
| 2025 | Apple Cider Vinegar | Lucy Guthrie | TV series: 6 episodes |

=== Writing and directing ===
| Year | Title | Role | Notes |
|---|---|---|---|
| 2017 | A Field Guide to Being a 12-Year-Old Girl | Writer & director | Short film, shown on ABC ME |
| 2020 | Roborovski | Co-writer & director, with Dev Patel | Short film |
| TBA | It's All Going Very Well No Problems At All | Writer & director, also actress | Feature film |

== Theatre ==
| Year | Title | Role | Notes |
|---|---|---|---|
| 2016 | Things I Know to Be True | Rosie Price | State Theatre Company of South Australia |
| 2017 | Vale | Isla Vale | State Theatre Company of South Australia |
| 2021 | Two Strangers Walk Into a Bar | Voice-over | Devised by Cobham-Hervey |
| 2023 | The Dictionary of Lost Words | Esme Nicoll | State Theatre Company of South Australia |
