= Australian contemporary dance =

Contemporary dance in Australia is diverse with dance companies performing a broad range of what elsewhere may be termed contemporary and modern dance styles.

The two largest companies are Sydney Dance Company and Bangarra Dance Theatre, both based in Sydney and touring nationally. Other notable contemporary dance companies based in different parts of Australia include Australian Dance Theatre, Chunky Move and Dancenorth.

Contemporary arts centres like Arts House in Melbourne and Carriageworks in Sydney regularly feature contemporary dance in their programs. Major performing arts festivals, like the Adelaide Festival, Sydney Festival and Perth Festival, often commission and present contemporary dance. Contemporary dance-specific festivals include Dance Massive in Melbourne.

Most companies work on a project basis with artists contracted for a set period of time, ranging from days to months, with no guarantee of further employment. Other funding sources include project specific funding for a dance work by example by a festival or performance venue to raise the expenses required to bring it to fruition.

== History ==
Austrian dancer, choreographer and teacher Gertrud Bodenwieser arrived in Sydney in 1939, where she established a studio, created new works and trained dancers. The Bodenwieser tradition later influenced Australian contemporary dance practitioners including Shirley McKechnie, who became one of the pioneers of the form in Australia.

== Dance film ==
Dance film provides one mode of contemporary dance in Australia with the ReelDance Festival, being the main avenue, with other opportunities being through installations at venues such as night clubs, back alley's to art galleries, shown as part of a live performance, or sometimes purchased for home viewing.

== On television ==
So You Think You Can Dance Australia has drawn criticism for poorly representing dance as an art form.

ABC1 broadcasts contemporary dance as part of its Sunday Arts programming.

== Companies ==
Australian contemporary dance companies include:

- Australian Dance Theatre (based in Adelaide)
- Bangarra Dance Theatre (based in Sydney)
- Chunky Move (based in Melbourne)
- Co3 (based in Perth)
- Dancenorth (based in Townsville)
- Force Majeure (based in Sydney)
- Expressions Dance Company (based in Brisbane)
- Dance Hub SA (formerly Leigh Warren & Dancers, based in Adelaide)
- Restless Dance Company (based in Adelaide)
- SCIMM Dance Company (based in Melbourne)
- Sydney Dance Company (based in Sydney)
- Tasdance (based in Launceston)
- Tracks Inc (based in Darwin)
- Great Southern Dance (based in Hobart)
