= Digital Theatre (website) =

London-based provider of digital platforms for the arts

- Industry: Video production
- Founded: 2009; 17 years ago in London, United Kingdom
- Founders: Robert Delamere; Tom Shaw
- Headquarters: London, United Kingdom
- Key people: Neelay Patel (CEO)
- Parent: ScaleUp Capital
- Website: digitaltheatreplus.com

Digital Theatre is a company that provides digital platforms for the arts. Founded by Robert Delamere and Tom Shaw and launched in London in 2009, the company produces and licenses high-definition films of stage productions that can be streamed on demand for both consumer and educational purposes.

In 2011, Digital Theatre's flagship digital educational platform Digital Theatre+ was launched, providing institutions around the world with access to productions and educational resources to support the teaching of English and Drama.

Digital Theatre was acquired by ScaleUp Capital (formerly Root Capital LLP) in 2015. In 2019, former head of BBC iPlayer and BBC Sounds Neelay Patel was appointed CEO.

== Partners ==
Digital Theatre partners with a number of major theatre companies to produce and license productions for the platform. Partners include Sonia Friedman Productions, Almeida Theatre, Donmar Warehouse, Royal Opera House, English Touring Theatre, Eclipse, Royal Shakespeare Company, The Old Vic and Frantic Assembly.

== Original productions ==
As well as licensing productions from partner companies, Digital Theatre also produces original live captures of stage productions in the UK.

Year	Production	Playwright	Director	Company	Theatre	Ref.
2009	Over There	Mark Ravenhill	Mark Ravenhill and Ramin Gray	Royal Court Theatre	Royal Court Theatre	
2009	The Container	Clare Bayley	Tom Wright		Young Vic	
2009	The Comedy of Errors	William Shakespeare	Paul Hunter	Royal Shakespeare Company and Told by an Idiot	Clapham Community Project	
2009	Far from the Madding Crowd	Adapted by Mark Healey	Kate Saxon	English Touring Theatre	Yvonne Arnaud Theatre	
2010	Kafka's Monkey	Adapted by Colin Teevan	Walter Meierjohann		Young Vic	
2010	Parlour Song	Jez Butterworth	Ian Rickson	Almeida Theatre	Almeida Theatre	
2011	All My Sons	Arthur Miller	Howard Davies		Apollo Theatre	
2011	As You Like It	William Shakespeare	Michael Boyd	Royal Shakespeare Company	The Courtyard Theatre	
2011	Billy The Kid	Michael Morpurgo	Tony Graham		Unicorn Theatre	
2011	Into The Woods	Stephen Sondheim and James Lapine	Timothy Sheader	Regent’s Park Open Air Theatre	Regent’s Park Open Air Theatre	
2011	Lovesong	Abi Morgan	Scott Graham	Frantic Assembly	Lyric Hammersmith	
2011	Macbeth	William Shakespeare	Gemma Bodinetz		Everyman Theatre, Liverpool	
2011	Much Ado About Nothing	William Shakespeare	Josie Rourke	Sonia Friedman Productions	Wyndham's Theatre	
2012	King Lear	William Shakespeare	Michael Attenborough	Almeida Theatre	Almeida Theatre	
2012	Long Day’s Journey Into Night	Eugene O’Neill	Anthony Page		Apollo Theatre	
2013	A Doll's House	Henrik Ibsen	Carrie Cracknell		Young Vic	
2013	Beautiful Thing	Jonathan Harvey	Nikolai Foster		Arts Theatre	
2013	Private Lives	Noël Coward	Jonathan Kent		Gielgud Theatre	
2014	Ghosts	Henrik Ibsen	Richard Eyre	Almeida Theatre	Almeida Theatre	
2014	The Crucible	Arthur Miller	Yaël Farber		The Old Vic	
2011	True West	Sam Shepard	Phillip Breen		Tricycle Theatre (now Kiln Theatre)	
2015	Henry V		Joe Talbot	WillShake		
2016	Iphigenia In Splott	Gary Owen	Rachel O'Riordan		Sherman Theatre	
2017	Casanova		Kenneth Tindall	Northern Ballet	Palace Theatre	
2017	Funny Girl	Jule Styne, Isobel Lennart and Bob Merrill	Michael Mayer	Sonia Friedman Productions	Palace Theatre	
2018	Don Giovanni	Wolfgang Amadeus Mozart	Alessandro Talevi	Opera North	Grand Theatre and Opera House	
2018	Othello	William Shakespeare	Richard Twyman	English Touring Theatre	Warwick Arts Centre	
2018	Things I Know to Be True	Andrew Bovell	Scott Graham	Frantic Assembly	Lyric Hammersmith	
2019	Negative Space		Mole Wetherell	Reckless Sleepers	New Adelphi Theatre	
2020	15 Heroines		Cat Robey, Tom Littler and Adjoa Andoh	Jermyn Street Theatre	Jermyn Street Theatre	

== Awards and nominations ==
Year	Award	Category	Result	Ref.
2017	Theatre & Technology Awards	Best Online/Live Streaming Platform	Won	
2018	Webby Awards	Best Streaming Platform	Nominated	
2018	DigitalAgenda Impact Awards	Education Award	Won	
2018	Tech for Teachers	Best Arts Resource	Won	
2019	Theatre & Technology Awards	Best Online/Live Streaming Platform	Won	
2021	Bett Awards	Company of the Year (less than £3m turnover)	Nominated	
