= Nathan Page =

Australian actor

- Born: Perth, Western Australia
- Education: Australian Institute of Sport; Centre for Performing Arts
- Occupations: Actor, voice actor
- Known for: Miss Fisher's Murder Mysteries
- Spouse: Sarah-Jayne Howard
- Children: 2

Nathan Page is an Australian actor of stage and screen, and former cyclist. He has performed on stage in Sydney, Melbourne, and Adelaide, but is perhaps best known for his role as Detective Inspector Jack Robinson in Miss Fisher's Murder Mysteries and commercial voice-over work. His recent screen work includes the role of Richard Melvyn in the 2026 TV series adaptation of My Brilliant Career for Netflix, and in the folk horror feature debut by Johanis Lyons-Reid, Lucrum, premiering on 23 October 2026 at the Adelaide Film Festival.

== Early life and education ==
Nathan Page was born in Perth, Western Australia to an Air Force family and moved around Australia frequently as a child.

He started cycling in Canberra at the age of 14, and shot up through the racing ranks in New South Wales. He began competing at national level at 15, which led to a scholarship to the Australian Institute of Sport (AIS) in Adelaide.

After finishing with his cycling career, Page began with a weekly drama class before studying at the Centre for Performing Arts in Adelaide (now the Adelaide College of the Arts), graduating in 1996.

== Career ==
=== Cycling ===
Page attended the AIS with Stuart O'Grady, and competed in Europe with Lance Armstrong. He retired from professional cycling at the age of 19 due to various injuries and his inability to remain competitive in Europe without performance-enhancing drugs.

=== Acting ===
In the first years of his acting career, Page primarily worked in theatre productions in Adelaide, where he lived for two years after graduating. In July 1998 he played King Duncan in a with the State Theatre Company of South Australia (STCSA) production of Macbeth, alongside Essie Davis.

In 2002 he appeared in Same, Same But Different, a major work created by Kate Champion and performed by dance theatre company Force Majeure. The work was performed at Sydney Festival, Brisbane Festival, Sydney Opera House, and the Melbourne Festival.

Page appeared in the films Strange Fits of Passion in 1999 and Sample People in 2000. In 2003, he had a recurring role in the third season of The Secret Life of Us as Charlie, Richie Blake's boyfriend. In 2009, he was lauded for his performance as Ray 'Chuck' Bennett in Underbelly: A Tale of Two Cities.

In 2011, Page played Alasdair "Mac" Macdonald, the husband of Ita Buttrose in Paper Giants: The Birth of Cleo, an ABC miniseries about Buttrose's life. After the series aired, Macdonald sued the ABC for defamation for erroneously depicting him as deserting his family. Scenes of Page's performance in Paper Giants were played in court as evidence. The ABC later issued a formal apology to Macdonald.

In 2012, Page co-starred as Detective Inspector Jack Robinson in all three seasons of Miss Fisher's Murder Mysteries opposite Essie Davis. In 2013, he played Henry Stokes in Underbelly: Squizzy on Nine Network. In 2015, he played Koz Krilich in Hiding on the ABC.

In 2016, Page returned to the stage for the first time in ten years. He played Vinnie in The Distance with the Melbourne Theatre Company and starred as Richard Hannay in The 39 Steps with the State Theatre Company of South Australia in Adelaide. In April 2018 he starred in Andrew Bovell's debut play, After Dinner, in a 30th-anninversary STCSA production along with Elena Carapetis and Jude Henshall.

He has twice performed the role of Richard Hannay in The 39 Steps on stage with STCSA, once in 2016 and again in 2019, in what is described as a "theatrical mash-up of John Buchan's original novel and Alfred Hitchcock's legendary film".

In 2019 he starred in Sophie Hyde's drama miniseries for SBS, The Hunting.

Page was cast as a lead actor in the 2020 film Miss Fisher and the Crypt of Tears. He appeared in the 2020 thriller film Escape from Pretoria, alongside Daniel Radcliffe, which was filmed in Adelaide in March 2019. In 2022, Page appeared in an episode of the thriller television series The Tourist, playing Constable Alex.

Page played Richard Melvyn in the 2026 TV series adaptation of My Brilliant Career for Netflix, appearing in 5 episodes. Also in 2026, Page stars in the folk horror feature debut by Johanis Lyons-Reid, Lucrum, along with Sophie Lowe and Tahlia Sturzaker. The film, made under the SAFC's Film Lab: New Voices initiative, premieres on 23 October 2026 at the Adelaide Film Festival.

Page also works as a voice actor. He has voiced numerous television commercials for such companies as Schweppes, BMW, Kubota Tractor Corporation, and Asics, as well as the Royal Australian Navy.

== Recognition ==
A photograph of Page, titled The Chameleon IV, 2015 by Sydney-based photographer Sam McAdam-Cooper, was a finalist for the National Photographic Portrait Prize in 2016. Finalist photographs were displayed at the National Portrait Gallery in Canberra and were exhibited throughout Australia in 2016 and 2017.

== Personal life ==
Page, after spending a couple of years in Adelaide after graduating from drama school, moved first to Sydney and then Melbourne.

He married New Zealand dancer and choreographer Sarah-Jayne Howard, who in 2018 became associate director of the Australian Dance Theatre in Adelaide under Garry Stewart, when the family moved back to Adelaide. They have two sons.

== Acting credits ==
=== Television ===
| Year | Title | Role | Notes |
|---|---|---|---|
| 2002 | White Collar Blue | Rick Calliope | Episode # 1.4 |
| 2003 | The Secret Life of Us | Charlie | 12 episodes |
| 2007 | Home and Away | Colin Marshall | Episode # 1.4532 |
| 2009 | Underbelly: A Tale of Two Cities | Ray 'Chuck' Bennett | 3 episodes |
| 2009 | All Saints | Paul | Episode: "Safe Haven" |
| 2011 | Paper Giants: The Birth of Cleo | Alasdair 'Mac' Macdonald | Miniseries, 2 episodes |
| 2012 | Redfern Now | Homicide Detective | Episode: "Pretty Boy Blue" |
| 2012–2015 | Miss Fisher's Murder Mysteries | Detective Inspector John 'Jack' Robinson | 34 episodes |
| 2013 | Underbelly: Squizzy | Henry Stokes | 4 episodes |
| 2015 | Hiding | Kosta 'Koz' Krilich | 8 episodes |
| 2019 | The Hunting | Sam | Miniseries, 4 episodes |
| 2022 | The Tourist | Constable Alex | 1 episode |
| 2026 | My Brilliant Career | Richard Melvyn | 5 episodes |

=== Film ===
| Year | Title | Role | Notes |
|---|---|---|---|
| 1999 | Strange Fits of Passion | Simon | |
| 2000 | Sample People | Len | |
| 2006 | Alex's Party | Traficante de Drogas | Short film |
| 2007 | Noise | Nigel Gower | |
| 2008 | Scorched | Gavin | TV movie |
| 2009 | Accidents Happen | Sexy Man | |
| 2009 | The Boys Are Back | Headbutter | |
| 2010 | Wicked Love: The Maria Korp Story | Detective Bradley | TV movie |
| 2011 | Panic at Rock Island | Matthew Cross | |
| 2011 | Sleeping Beauty | Businessman | |
| 2013 | Vote Yes | Howard | Short film |
| 2020 | Miss Fisher and the Crypt of Tears | Detective Inspector Jack Robinson | TV movie |
| 2020 | Escape from Pretoria | Mongo | |
| 2026 | Lucrum | Mongo | |

=== Theatre ===
Page's work in Australian theatre includes:

| Year | Work | Character | Theatre |
|---|---|---|---|
| 1995 | The Fairy Queen | Bottom | Scott Theatre, Adelaide with Helpmann Academy |
| 1996 | Anger's Love | Marcello | Theatre 62, Adelaide; The Street Theatre, Canberra, with Centre for the Performing Arts |
| 1996 | The Lower Depths | | Price Theatre, Adelaide |
| 1997 | Mercedes / In the Solitude of Cotton Fields | | Queen's Theatre, Adelaide with Magpie Theatre Company |
| 1997 | Features of Blown Youth | Guido | Queen's Theatre, Adelaide with Magpie Theatre Company |
| 1998 | Macbeth | Duncan | Space Theatre, Adelaide with STCSA |
| | UR Faust | Faust | |
| 2000 | La Dispute | Mesrin | Wharf Theatre, Sydney with STC |
| 2001 | Design for Living | Leo | Playhouse Theatre, Melbourne, Dunstan Playhouse, Adelaide with MTC & STCSA |
| 2002 | Same, Same But Different | | Lyric Theatre, Brisbane, Playhouse, Melbourne with Force Majeure & Performing Lines |
| 2003 | Who's Afraid of Virginia Woolf? | Nick | Space Theatre, Adelaide with STCSA |
| 2004 | A Midsummer Night's Dream | | Belvoir Street Theatre |
| 2005 | Already Elsewhere | | Sydney Opera House with Force Majeure & Performing Lines |
| 2006 | Been So Long | | Bunka, Adelaide with Three Legs in the Quadrella Theatre Company |
| 2006 | Peribanez | | Seymour Theatre, Sydney |
| 2007; 2009 | Nightcafe | | Bombay Rock, Townsville, Hopgood Theatre, Adelaide with Dancenorth |
| 2016 | The Distance | Vinnie | Southbank Theatre, Melbourne |
| 2016 | The 39 Steps | Richard Hannay | Dunstan Playhouse, Adelaide with STCSA |
| 2018 | After Dinner | Stephen | Dunstan Playhouse with STCSA |
| 2019 | The 39 Steps | Richard Hannay | Dunstan Playhouse, Adelaide, Sir Robert Helpmann Theatre, Mt Gambier, Merrigong Theatre, Wollongong, Canberra Theatre Centre, Geelong Arts Centre, with STCSA |
| 2020 | Ripcord | | Dunstan Playhouse, Adelaide with STCSA |
| 2023 | The Goat, or Who Is Sylvia? | Martin | Roslyn Packer Theatre, Sydney with STC & STCSA |
