= CO3 =

CO3 or Co3 may refer to:

- Carbon trioxide
- Carbonate
- MT-CO3
- A postcode district in Colchester, UK
- Conway group Co3 in mathematics
- Co3, Australian contemporary dance company listed in Australian contemporary dance
- Company 3
- Colorado's 3rd congressional district
