= Illuminate Adelaide =

Annual festival in Adelaide, South Australia

- Status: Active
- Frequency: Annual
- Locations: Adelaide, South Australia
- Coordinates: 34.91898°S 138.599986°E
- Country: Australia
- Years active: 5
- Established: 2021
- Most recent: 1 - 19 July 2026
- Previous event: 2 - 20 July 2025
- Next event: July 2027
- Attendance: 1.6 million
- Sponsors: Government of South Australia
- Website: illuminateadelaide.com

Illuminate Adelaide is an annual winter event held each July in Adelaide, South Australia. It includes free and ticketed events presented by local, national, and international artists and companies, encompassing "art, light, music, and technology".

The first event was announced by the Government of South Australia in August 2020 and was planned for July in the following year, intending to showcase various types of light shows, art installations, immersive technology, music, performance arts, and to present ideas for public debate. The Co-Founders and Creative Directors are Rachael Azzopardi and Lee Cumberlidge.

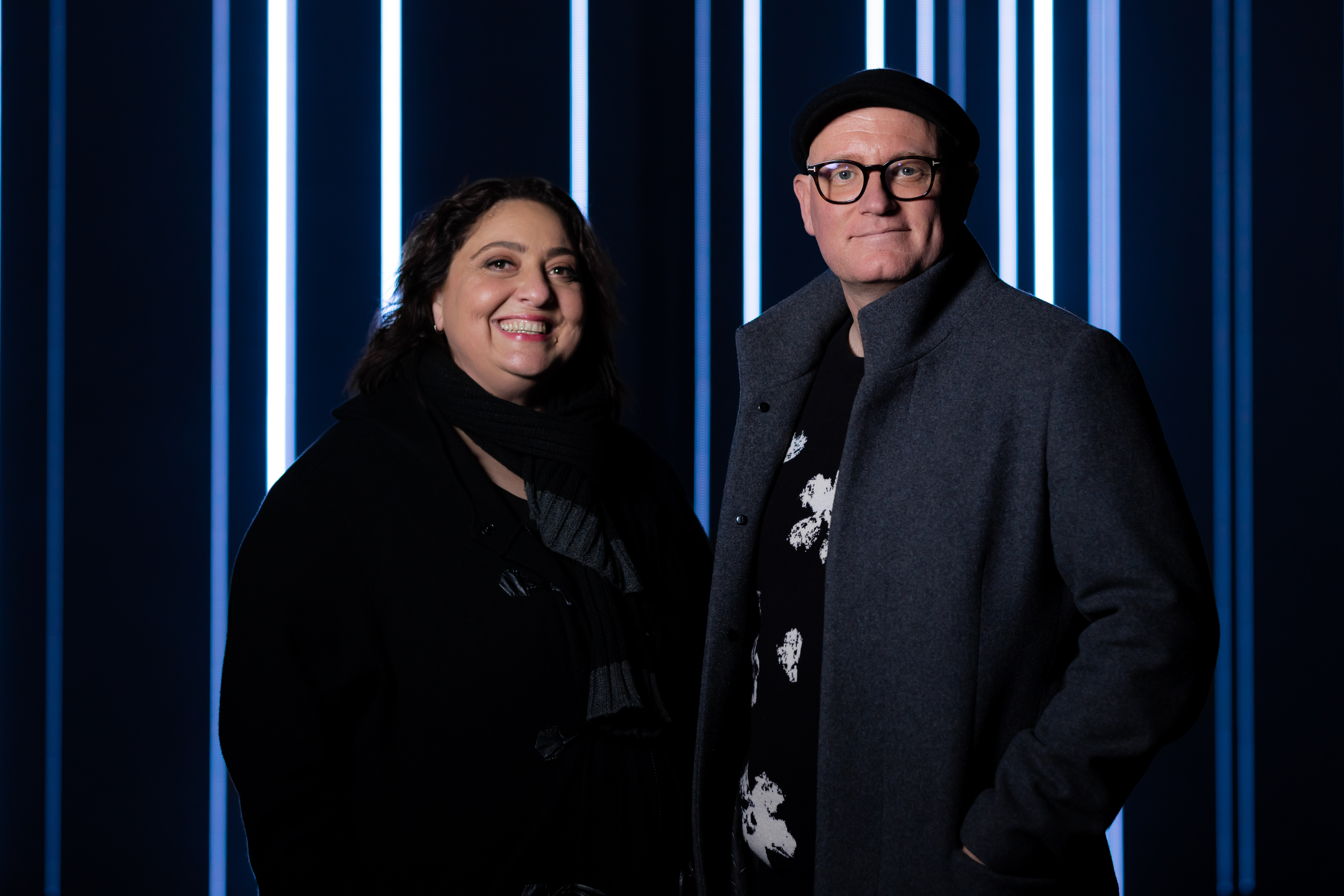
Illuminate Adelaide Co-Founders & Creative Directors Rachael Azzopardi and Lee Cumberlidge. Credit - Frankie the Creative

== Illuminate Adelaide Program ==
The 2021 event took place over 17 nights in July, although some events were also presented during the day, and were extended for longer; one exhibition, Van Gogh Alive: The Experience, ran until mid-September. In 2021, the Adelaide Festival of Ideas was incorporated within Illuminate Adelaide, taking place over three days at the University of Adelaide.

The 2022 event took place throughout the whole months of July and August. Returning events included Light Cycles by Moment Factory in Adelaide Botanic Garden, Light Creatures at Adelaide Zoo, and city-wide free event City Lights. UK band Gorillaz and Poland's Unsound Festival spearheaded the music program, and Istanbul-based Ouchhh Studio presented Wisdom of AI Light, and were Illuminate Adelaide's Luminary Artists in Residence.

In 2023, new events Resonate and Mirror Mirror, both by Montreal-based studio Moment Factory, took place in Adelaide's CBD across June, July, and August. City Lights returned across Adelaide's North, East, and West city precincts, and Unsound Festival returned with a new line-up. Yothu Yindi, Oneohtrix Point Never, and Tourist headlined the music program, and Restless Dance Theatre presented a new work, Shifting Perspectives.

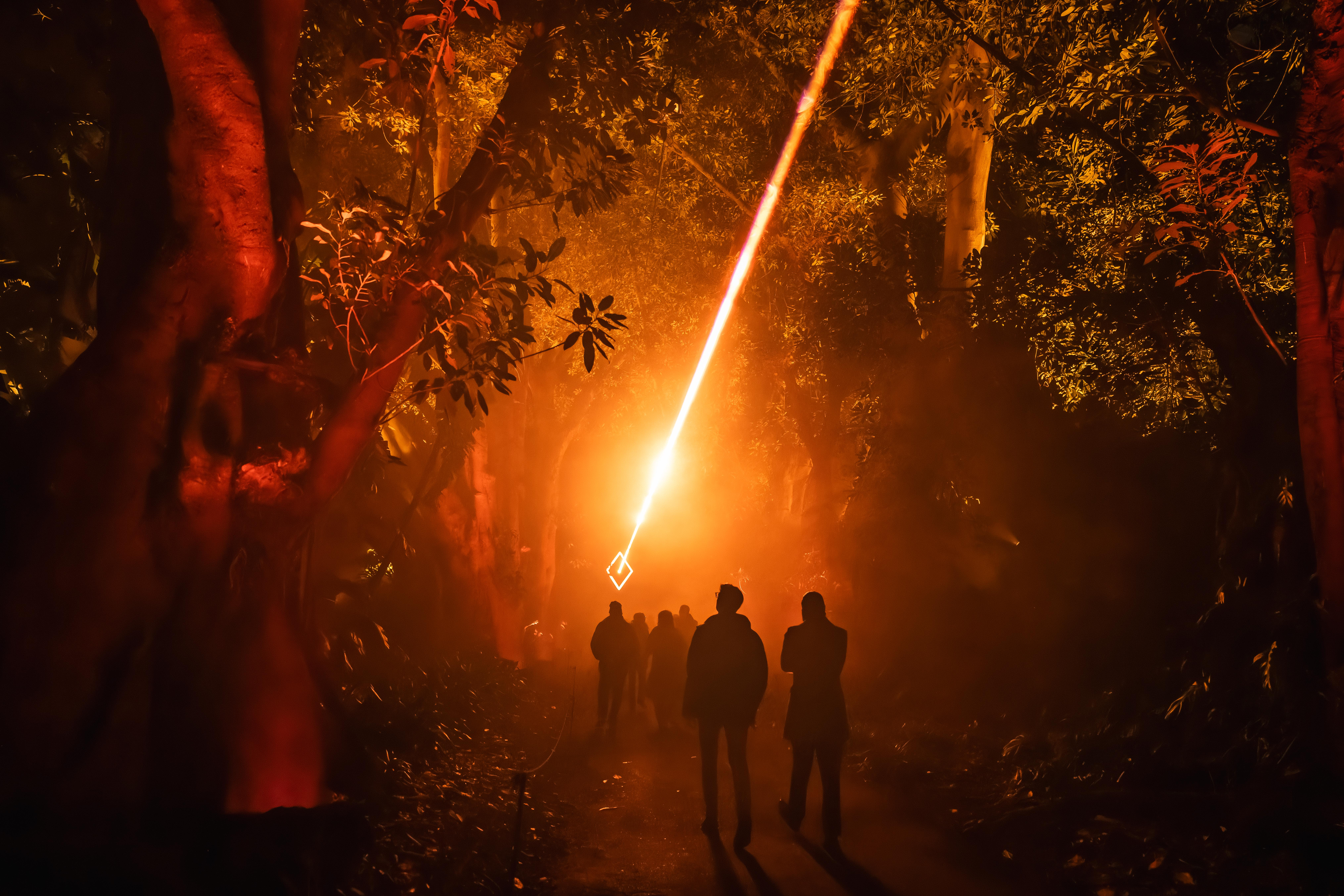
Resonate by Moment Factory at Adelaide Botanic Garden, Illuminate Adelaide 2023 - Credit Tyr Liang at Xplorer Studio

In 2024 Fire Gardens by French masters of flame Compagnie Carabosse took over Adelaide Botanic Garden. Families enjoyed EDEN by flora&faunavisions, Superluminal by Patch Theatre, and a new Adelaide Zoo event called Universal Kingdom: Prehistoric Nights. The free centerpiece City Lights returned to transform Adelaide’s iconic CBD institutions. Polish experimental music program Unsound Adelaide and Unsound Club also returned to lead the music program, and the pop-up village Base Camp moved to Lot Fourteen.

Illuminate Adelaide 2025 will be presented in July throughout Adelaide.

== Regional Events ==
Illuminate Adelaide has presented free events in regional areas of South Australia, including Tumby Bay, Victor Harbor, Mount Gambier, Renmark, and Mannum.

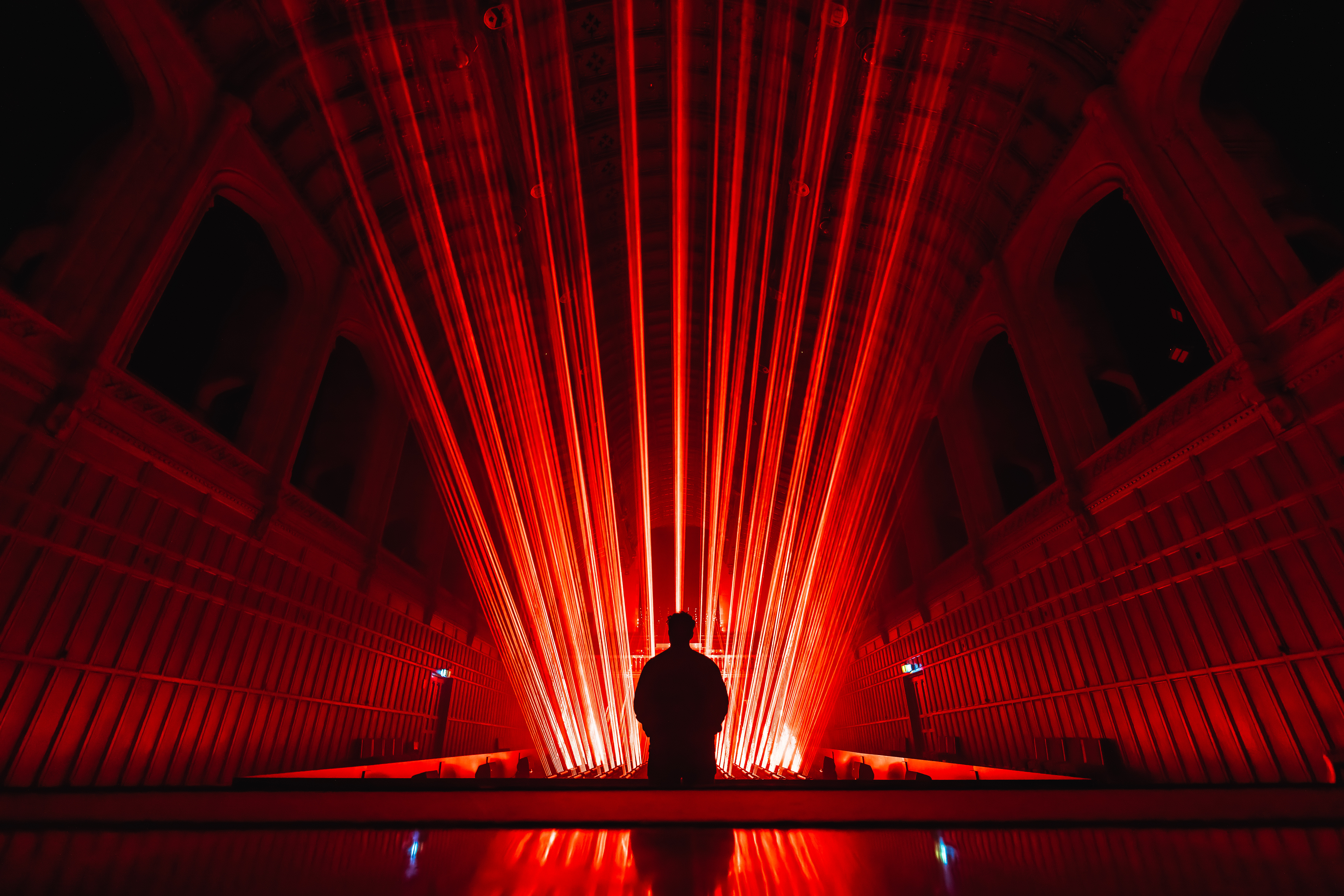
#intangibleform by Shohei Fujimoto, City Lights, Illuminate Adelaide 2024 - Credit Tyr Liang at Xplorer Studio

== Luminary Artists in Residence ==
Each year, Illuminate Adelaide selects one artist, company, or group to act as the Luminary Artist in Residence. Presenting additional talks and experiences, the Luminary Artist in Residence explores their creative practice, inspirations, and practical approaches with members of the general public. Luminary Artist in Residence recipients come from a range of artistic backgrounds, including music, immersive art, and technology.

- 2021 - The Avalanches
- 2022 - Ouchhh Studio
- 2023 - Moment Factory

== Funding ==
Classified as a Major Event in South Australia, Illuminate Adelaide is supported by the state government through the South Australian Tourism Commission.

Additional funding partners have included Adelaide Economic Development Agency, RAA, The University of Adelaide and more.

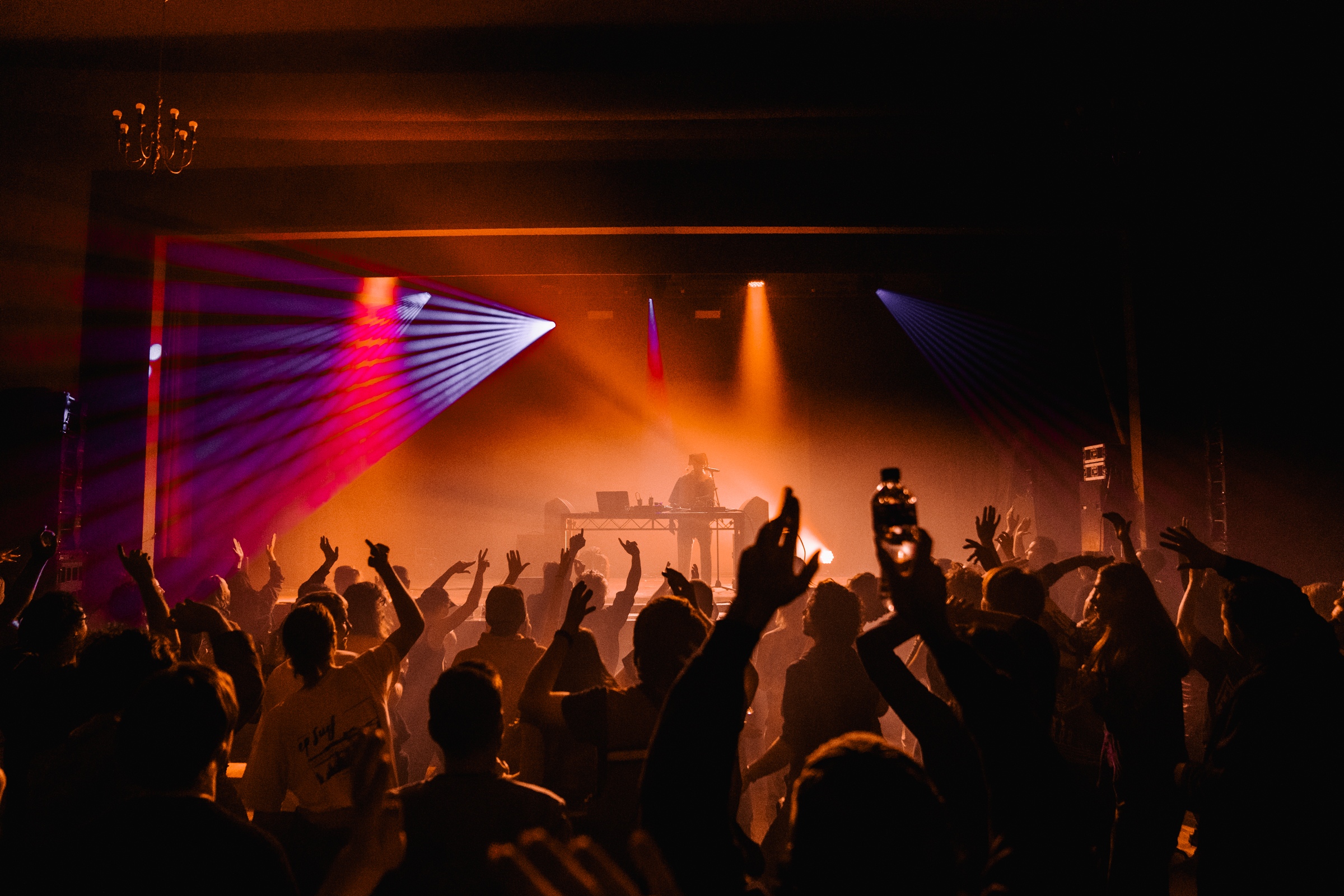
DJ Diaki at Unsound Adelaide, Illuminate Adelaide 2023 - Credit Saige Prime
