= Kate Champion =

Australian dancer

- Born: 1961 (age 64–65)
- Occupations: Dancer, choreographer, artistic director
- Organizations: Black Swan State Theatre Company 2022; Force Majeure

Kate Champion is an Australian choreographer and artistic director. Since 2022 and as of 2024 she is artistic director of Black Swan State Theatre Company in Perth, Western Australia. She was the founding artistic director/CEO of Force Majeure dance company in Sydney, from 2002 to 2015, where she co-devised and directed such works as Same, Same But Different and Not in a Million Years. She also created and performed the critically-acclaimed solo shows, Face Value and About Face, and has been the recipient of numerous awards, including three Helpmann Awards.

Champion has worked in theatre, dance, film, circus, opera, and musical theatre, with arts companies including Belvoir, Sydney Theatre Company, State Theatre Company of South Australia, The English National Opera, Opera Australia, and Hayes Theatre. She choreographed the original stage version of the film Dirty Dancing.

== Early life and education ==
Kate Champion was born in 1961.

She travelled to Munich at age 16 working with Iwanson Dance Company. Returning to Australia, Champion was a member of One Extra Dance Company before moving to New York City to study, and then returning to Australia becoming a foundation member of Dance North.

== Career ==
In 1992 Champion travelled to London, where she spent time with Lloyd Newson's DV8 Physical Theatre, first as production assistant and then as a performer in Strange Fish, both the stage and BBC film versions. In 1998 she returned to DV8 as rehearsal director for a European tour of Enter Achilles and as a collaborator and performer in The Happiest Day of My Life.

In 1996, Champion was awarded the Robert Helpmann Scholarship for Choreographic Excellence, enabling her to create her first solo work Face Value which was awarded a 1998 Green Room Award and a Mo Award. In 2001 she created a second solo show, About Face.

In 1997 Champion begin collaborating with theatre director Neil Armfield and choreographed Cloudstreet, and directed and devised Under the Influence.

Champion and Lloyd Newson's DV8 Physical Theatre worked together in creating a devised show for the Sydney Olympic Arts Festival, The Cost of Living. As a professional dancer, she also worked with Australian Dance Theatre, Dance North, One Extra Co, and Theatre of Image.

=== Force Majeure ===
In 2002 Champion founded and became artistic director of a new company, Force Majeure, in Sydney, where she stayed until 2015. Her co-founders were Roz Hervey and Geoff Cobham.

While there, she devised and directed:

- Same, same, But Different – Sydney Festival, Brisbane Festival, Melbourne Festival (2002)
- Already Elsewhere – Sydney Festival (2005), Biennale de la Danse, Lyon (2006)
- The Age I'm In– Sydney Festival, Adelaide Festival (2008), Dublin Theatre Festival, Seoul Performing Arts Festival, Montreal Place des Arts (2009), national tour (2010)
- Not in a Million Years – Carriageworks (2010), Dance Massive Festival (2011)
- Never Did Me Any Harm – a co-production with Sydney Theatre Company, Sydney Festival, Adelaide Festival, Melbourne Festival (2012), national tour (2016)
- Food – a coproduction with Belvoir (2012), metropolitan tour (2013), national tour (2014)
- Nothing to Lose – Sydney Festival, Malthouse Theatre (2015)

=== Other work ===
Champion has worked in theatre, dance, film, circus, opera and musical theatre with arts companies and institutes including Belvoir, Sydney Theatre Company, State Theatre Company of South Australia, Performing Lines, The English National Opera, Opera Australia, Hayes Theatre, Ensemble Theatre, NIDA, National Institute of Circus Arts, and National Theatre of Parramatta.

Theatre directing credits include – Every Brilliant Thing (Belvoir), My Brilliant Career, Food, That Eye the Sky, A View From the Bridge, Fully Committed, Honour, Evie May and Perfect Stranger.

In 2004 Champion choreographed the world premiere of Dirty Dancing, the stage show based on the popular film. Her choreography has been included in the European, West-End, North American, South African, and Asian versions of this box-office-record-holding production.

In 2010 she choreographed Opera Australia's Bliss, which also toured to the Edinburgh Festival, and Spring Awakening for Sydney Theatre Company.

Continuing her collaborative relationship with Neil Armfield, Champion took on the role of associate director of Opera Australia's 2013 production (and 2016 remount) of Wagner's Ring Cycle, directed by Armfield.

Sometime before 2016, Champion undertook a one-month residency at multi-disciplinary arts centre The Mill in Adelaide, as part of their Choreographic Futures program, the outcomes of which were described as "profound".

In 2016 she directed Swallow, written by Stef Smith – the inaugural production of National Theatre of Parramatta. In 2018 Champion directed That Eye the Sky, adapted from the novel by Tim Winton for State Theatre Company of South Australia, and the world premiere of the musical Evie May for Hayes Theatre. 2019 productions included Every Brilliant Thing for Belvoir Theatre, Meat Eaters and Perfect Strangers for NIDA, A View From the Bridge for State Theatre Company of Australia and Fully Committed and Honour for Ensemble Theatre.

Champion choreographed the movement sequences in the film Somersault (starring Abbie Cornish and Sam Worthington), and most recently RED.

=== Black Swan ===
In 2022, Champion was appointed artistic director of Black Swan State Theatre Company, at the same time as the appointment of Ian Booth as Chief Executive Officer. As of November 2024 she remains in the position.

== Awards ==
=== Australian Dance Awards ===
The Australian Dance Awards.

| Year | Nominee / work | Award | Result (wins only) |
|---|---|---|---|
| 2005 | Kate Champion – Already Elsewhere | Outstanding Performance by a Company | Won |
| 2009 | Kate Champion – The Age I'm In | Outstanding Performance by a Company | Won |

=== Helpmann Award ===
The Helpmann Awards.

| Year | Nominee / work | Award | Result (wins only) |
|---|---|---|---|
| 2002n | Kate Champion – About Face | Best Female Dance | Won |
| 2002n | Kate Champion – Same, Same But Different | Best Visual or Physical Theatre Production | Won |
| 2011 | Kate Champion – Not in a Million Years | Best Visual or Physical Theatre Production | Won |

=== Mo Awards ===
The Australian Entertainment Mo Awards (commonly known informally as the Mo Awards), were annual Australian entertainment industry awards. They recognise achievements in live entertainment in Australia from 1975 to 2016.

| Year | Nominee / work | Award | Result (wins only) |
|---|---|---|---|
| 1998 | Kate Champion | Female Dance Performance of the Year | Won |

=== Other Awards ===
- Nothing to Lose – 2016 FBi Radio SMAC Award for Best on Stage
- Face Value – 1998 Greenroom Award for Best Female Dancer,
