= Edith Thompson (historian) =

British historian and lexicographer (1848–1929)

Edith Thompson (1848-1929) was a historian and lexicographer. She wrote "History of England" the second volume of the "Historical Course for Schools", which was devised and edited by Edward Freeman, with whom she corresponded regularly.

She was also a prolific contributor to the first edition of the Oxford English Dictionary. Along with her sister, Elizabeth Perronet Thompson, she provided 15,000 quotations for the dictionary. She also subedited the volume for "C" words and proofread volumes from "D" words onwards.

Thompson was barred from university, as a woman, but did receive some recognition as an Honorary Member of the Bath branch of the National Federation of University Women. She and her sister, Elizabeth Thompson (1857–1930) lived at Beaconsfield Lodge in Bath. Elizabeth published a historical novel The Veil of Liberty, A Tale of the Girondins (1895) under her penname "Peronne" and A Dragoon's Wife, A Romance of the 17th Century (1907) under her own name.

Thompson was the granddaughter of Thomas Perronet Thompson, a notable abolitionist, about whom she wrote a biography that went unpublished.

== In popular culture ==
Edith Thompson is a major character in Pip Williams' novel The Dictionary of Lost Words, where she mentors a fictional goddaughter who works on the Oxford English Dictionary.
