= Sarah-Jayne Howard =

New Zealand dancer

Sarah-Jayne Howard (born 3 July 1976) is a New Zealand dancer and choreographer. She was associate artistic director at Australian Dance Theatre in Adelaide from 2018 until 2023, when she took up a role with Restless Dance Theatre.

== Early life and education ==
Sarah-Jayne Howard was born on 3 July 1976 in South Africa. She grew up in Stratford, Taranaki, New Zealand, after emigrating there with her family when she was five years old.

She trained at the New Zealand School of Dance, and graduated with honours in 1995.

== Career ==
Howard danced for Meryl Tankard’s Australian Dance Theatre for four years and also choreographed two solo works for the company: Tonight and Veronique. She has also danced in Australia with Garry Stewart's company Thwack! and Gideon Obarzanek's Chunky Move dance company, and choreographed for Company B (later Belvoir), in Sydney.

She returned to New Zealand, where she performed in Inland, choreographed by Douglas Wright; White, by Raewyn Hill; and Weather, dancing with Michael Parmenter.

In 2007 she performed in Meryl Tankard's Kaidan at the Sydney Festival, and the following year travelled to London to perform in roadkill by Splinter group.

In 2018, she was appointed associate artistic director at Australian Dance Theatre under Garry Stewart. She continued in the role under new artistic director Daniel Riley until 2023, moving to become Public Programs Executive in Education Outreach for Restless Dance Theatre until 2025.

== Recognition and awards ==
In 2002, Howard was one of three finalists in the inaugural Rolex Mentor and Protégé Arts Initiative

In 2007, she received an Arts Foundation of New Zealand Laureate Award.

== Personal life ==
Howard married actor Nathan Page, and they have two sons. They moved from Melbourne to Adelaide in 2018.
