= Karla Hart =

Australian radio presenter

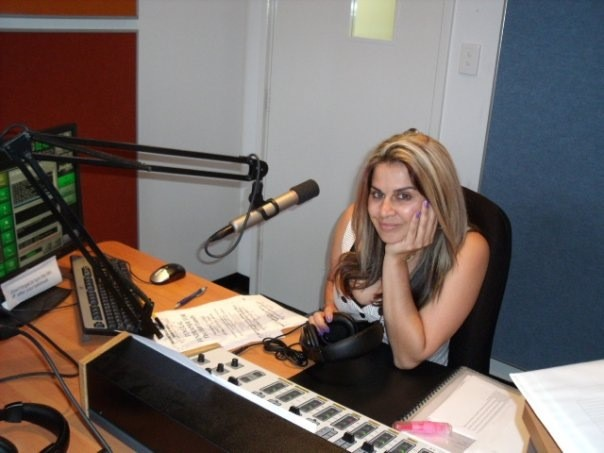
Karla Hart

Karla Hart is a writer, film-maker, dancer, actress and director and has been the event coordinator for Wardarnji Festival 2011- 2015. She is currently the drive time presenter for Noongar Radio, which broadcasts in Perth, Western Australia.

== Education ==
Hart learnt traditional dance from Noongar elders; she also studied Aboriginal Theatre at the Western Australian Academy of Performing Arts before completing a Bachelor of Arts in Contemporary Performance at Edith Cowan University.

== Work ==
Hart is currently co executive producer and shooter/director on new NITV series in the making "Family Rules". Hart has acted in acted, danced in a number of productions both on stage and in film and television; she has also written plays and coordinated major events, including the Wararnji Festival. She was a drive-time presenter for Noongar Radio for which she won a national award. Hart is also a board member of Yirra Yaakin Aboriginal Theatre Company, an independent theatre company in Western Australia.

=== Kwarbah Djookian ===
In 2004 Hart started the Kwarbah Djookian Dance Group, of which she is also a performer. The group has performed at many major event both locally and internationally and hundreds of events such as festivals, schools, concerts and corporate events.

== Works ==
Director:

- Seasons series

Performances:

- King Hit - played Belle and Kerry

Theatre writings:

- Co-wrote and acted in Black as Michael Jackson
- Co-created Fifty Shades of Black

Screen writings:

- Magic Quandong (2013) - winner WA Screen Awards 2013
- Sharing Caring
- Angela's Rules (2015)
- Meriny Time
- Shit Noongars Say
- Shit Whitefellas Say - sequel to Shit Noongars Say
- Mobulator
