= Zephyr Quartet =

String quartet based in Adelaide, South Australia

The Zephyr Quartet is a string quartet based in Adelaide, South Australia. Founded in 1999, they have been recognised with awards and have collaborated with international musicians.

== History ==
Founded in 1999, Zephyr has received tuition from the Takács Quartet, the Australian String Quartet and at the National Academy of Music, performed at festivals including the Adelaide Festival, Adelaide Fringe, Barossa Music Festival and the Glenelg Jazz Festival, and has presented concert series in 2004 and 2005 to great critical acclaim.

In August 2019, shortly after winning the APRA Award for Excellence by an Organisation (see below), Zephyr announced that they would be taking a pause from regular performances for a period, although not disbanding completely.

== Work ==
Zephyr has a continuing commitment to the development and promotion of contemporary classical music and often commissions and performs works by living composers. Zephyr has been committed to presenting concerts in an education context and would often perform for primary and secondary school students as a part of the Musica Viva in Schools program.

Each member of the quartet are also experienced composers, who often contribute their own work in their concerts and recordings.

The quartet has worked with Brink Productions, Australian Dance Theatre, and an interior designer, Khai Liew. Spanning many genres of music, they have played jazz with Andrea Keller, ambient music with Stars of the Lid, post-punk with JG Thirlwell, and minimalist music with Icelandic composer Jóhann Jóhannsson.

== Key people ==
The members of the quartet are:

- Belinda Gehlert – violin
- Emily Tulloch – violin
- Jason Thomas – viola
- Hilary Kleinig – cello

=== Hilary Kleinig ===
It was Kleinig who, when at university in 1999, asked some friends to play in a string quartet with her, starting what became the Zephyr Quartet.

Kleining plays cello and is a composer. She has written works commissioned and performed by the Adelaide Symphony Orchestra, Restless Dance Theatre, Adelaide Chamber Singers, and the Adelaide Youth Orchestra. She has also written music for plays. Apart from composing and performing music, Kleinig has been active in other roles, particularly musical education. She was involved in establishing Creative Original Music Adelaide (COMA) in 2005, serving as its artistic director from 2005 to 2007. She served on the New Music Network board from 2016 to 2019, and on the Adelaide Symphony Orchestra's advisory panel in 2019. She completed the Global Leaders Program in 2021, winning the Hildegard Behrens Foundation Social Impact Award. As of June 2026 Kleinig is co-director of the and lead teacher of Connecting the Dots in Music.

On 6 May 2026, she released a solo album called alone : together, a suite of eight original compositions for solo cello, which features looping sounds of the cello being conventionally bowed, but also plucked, harmonic, and percussive, creating layers of pop-style music. The album was recorded by Wizard Tone Studios in Hendon. Isabella Eagles, writing in Limelight, gave the album 4.5 stars out of 5. To launch the album, Kleinig is touring the country with a different guest artist in each state, starting with violinist and fellow Zephyr Quartet member Emily Tulloch at the Wheatsheaf Hotel in Thebarton on 25 May 2026. The others are pianist Nat Bartsch in Melbourne, harpist Emily Granger in Brisbane, and percussionist Claire Edwardes in Sydney. In July 2026, Kleinig is part of a project with Vitalstatistix, called The Lost Art of Listening, as part of Illuminate Adelaide.

== Awards ==
=== South Australian Music Awards ===
The South Australian Music Awards (previously known as the Fowler's Live Music Awards) are annual awards that exist to recognise, promote and celebrate excellence in the South Australian contemporary music industry. They commenced in 2012.

Year	Nominee / work	Award	Result (wins only)
2018	Zephyr Quartet	Best International Collaboration	Won

In August 2019, the Quartet won the APRA Award for Excellence by an Organisation, a national award by the Australasian Performing Right Association, AMCOS and the Australian Music Centre in Sydney, in the Art Music Awards category. The judges' comments included: “defies genre, style and expectation”, and mentioned its 20-year history of having “fearlessly championed new Australian work” and "sustained contribution to the local, national and international arts scene”.
