= Performance Space =

Performance Space, later Performance Space at Carriageworks, is an arts organisation based in Sydney, Australia, that develops and presents interdisciplinary arts and experimental theatre.

== History ==
Performance Space was established in 1983 in a venue in Cleveland St, Redfern (known as Cleveland Street Performance Space from 1980 until 1983), with Christopher Allen as its manager. The building was formerly the State Rail Authority Trade Union Dance Hall.

In April 1987, the newly-formed performance group The Sydney Front performed Waltz, composed by Sarah de Jong, directed by Nigel Kellaway, and featuring Roz Hervey, at the Performance Space.

In 2007 the Performance Space moved to the Carriageworks contemporary multi-arts centre, when the company became known as Performance Space at Carriageworks.

The original venue became known as 199 Cleveland Street Theatre between 2007 and 2013, and has also been referred to as Giant Dwarf Theatre and Old Performance Space.

== Description ==
Performance Space develops and presents interdisciplinary arts and experimental theatre.

As of November 2024 the CEO is Vanessa Lloyd and Kate Britton is the artistic director.

Performance Space is a member of the advocacy organisation Contemporary Art Organisations Australia.
