= Unsound Festival =

Annual music festival in Poland

Unsound Festival, also known as Unsound, is an annual music festival that takes place in Kraków, Poland, dealing with evolving and mutating forms of music, as well as related visual arts. Apart from the main festival, Unsound regularly takes place in cities around the world such as New York, London, Adelaide, Toronto, Minsk, and Tbilisi.

The Kraków festival is run by the non-profit organisation Fundacja Tone Muzyka i Nowe Formy Sztuki (Tone Foundation for Music and New Forms of Art).

== History ==
The first Unsound festival in Kraków, Poland took place in 2003, starting out as a local, underground event in the city's cellar bars. It currently falls in the first part of October and lasts around one week. Starting out as an event focused on Polish audiences, in recent years it has rapidly developed to become one of the most prominent events of its kind in Europe.

In 2010, the festival developed its program and visual identity around the theme "Horror, the pleasure of fear and unease", which explored the history and emerging trend of darkness in music. "Horror" was followed up in 2011 with the theme "Future Shock," inspired by the 1970 book by futurist Alvin Toffler. Subsequent themes have included "The End" (2012), "Interference" (2013) and "The Dream" (2014). The theme for 2015 was "Surprise", described in a press release that was heavily redacted and intentionally revealed little. Following were the themes "Dislocation","Flower Power", "Presence" and "Solidarity".

== Description ==
Unsound is also known for opening up architectural spaces, adapting them for music events. In Kraków, this includes Hotel Forum, a communist-era hotel building that had lain empty for a decade until Unsound 2012, then subsequently became an important cultural hub in the city. In Toronto in June 2015, Unsound adapted the abandoned Hearn Power Station to produce the first ever public event in the space in collaboration with Luminato Festival.

Unsound is a founding and active member of ICAS (International Cities of Advanced Sound).

=== Unsound directors ===
The co-founder and artistic director of Unsound is Mat Schulz. The executive director is Małgorzata Płysa.

== Other countries ==
In February 2010, Unsound cooperated with local partners in New York such as the Wordless Music series, Bunker and Electronic Music Foundation to create a 10-day satellite event involving music, film, workshops and panel discussions.

There have been events in London, partnering with The Barbican and BFI among others; and Unsound Toronto as part of Luminato.

Unsound has also worked in the region of Eastern Europe, Central Asia and The Caucasus, to create mini-festivals with local partners and curators. This includes the Unsound Dislocation project, which took place in 11 cities across the post-Soviet region in 2016–17.

=== Unsound Adelaide ===
Several events have been staged in Adelaide, South Australia, within the framework of the Adelaide Festival of Arts in 2013 and 2016. It again held the event over two nights in Adelaide in July 2022 as part of Illuminate Adelaide, in the Dom Polski Centre (a.k.a. the Polish Club) in Angas Street. In 2023, the event expanded to three nights, with the final one being held in the new Hindley Street Music Hall, featuring Oneohtrix Point Never supported by CORIN (Corin Ileto, Filipina-Australian electronic producer, composer, and performer). This event celebrated Unsound Adelaide's 10th anniversary.

== Projects ==
Unsound has produced many collaborative and commissioned projects. The history of these projects begins with 2008's Warhol Series, where live electronic and experimental music is played as a "soundtrack" to classic silent Andy Warhol films. Artists involved in this project include: Carl Craig, nsi., Groupshow, Stefan Németh and the video artist Lillevan. According to the Unsound website, the "series refers to Warhol’s own extensive use of pre-existing material to create something new, as well as the 60s multimedia event The Exploding Plastic Inevitable, which used Warhol’s film work as moving wallpaper projected onto a wall and musicians from The Velvet Underground."

Another key commissioned work is "Solaris," by Ben Frost and Daniel Bjarnasson in cooperation with Kraków's Sinfonietta Cracovia. Accompanied with visuals by Brian Eno and Nick Robertson, this piece premiered at Unsound Kraków in 2010, and was performed at Unsound Festival New York 2011 at Alice Tully Hall in the Lincoln Center. In 2014, Unsound partnered with Adelaide Festival to bring to life "Double Vision", created by Atom™ and Robin Fox. Like "Solaris", this project has gone on to tour the world.

Apart from commissioning works, Unsound has also become known as a platform for artists to premiere new pieces or shows - for example, Robert Henke's laser and sound work "Lumiere", which was launched in Kraków in 2013.

=== Ephemera ===
In 2014, Unsound launched its Ephemera project, connecting sound and scent. According to the Ephemera website, the project "presents olfactory compositions based on musical resonances and reverberations". The nose behind the project is Berlin-based Geza Schoen.

In the first phase of the project, three musicians—Ben Frost, Tim Hecker, and Steve Goodman (a.k.a. Kode9)—created raw sonic material which Schoen then reinterpreted to create three different scents: Noise, Drone and Bass. These scents and sounds were then used in an installation environment that premiered at Unsound Festival New York, and gained wide media attention. The installation was subsequently set up at the National Museum of Kraków, the Tromsø Kunstforening in Norway and the Malmo Inter-Arts Centre.

In October 2014, the Ephemera scents were released as perfumes with the music available as downloadable tracks, and have received positive reviews from "niche" perfume and music writers.

For the first time, Ephemera took the form of a live experience at Unsound Toronto on June 19, 2015, involving music by Tim Hecker, an olfactory component by Geza Schoen and lighting design by Marcel Weber. The critical reception for this work was highly positive, with the Canadian music website Exclaim writing "Ephemera is truly, unequivocally original – a sensory performance on a whole new level."

== See also ==
- List of electronic music festivals
- Live electronic music
- List of experimental music festivals
