= The Dictionary of Lost Words =

Book by Pip Williams

- Author: Pip Williams
- Cover artist: Lisa White
- Language: English
- Genre: Literary fiction
- Publisher: Affirm Press
- Publication date: 31 March 2020
- Publication place: Australia
- Media type: Print (paperback)
- Pages: 384 pp.
- ISBN: 978-1-925972-59-7

The Dictionary of Lost Words is the debut novel by Australian writer Pip Williams, published in March 2020. It became a bestseller in Australia and was also a New York Times bestseller. It won several literary prizes in 2021, and has been published in several languages in other countries.

== Plot summary ==
Esme's mother died giving her birth, so she is brought up by her father. She spends her childhood under the table in the Scriptorium, where James Murray and his team of lexicographers, including her father, are compiling the Oxford English Dictionary. Over time she discovers that words in common use, particularly those used by and about women, are not included.

The list of characters includes Edith Thompson; in the novel, she is Esme's godmother and surrogate aunt.

== Publication ==
The Dictionary of Lost Words was published in March 2020 by Affirm Press in Melbourne.

== Formats ==
In addition to being published in standard formats (paperback, ebook, audio book), a dyslexic edition is available. By March 2023 more than 260,000 copies of the printed book had been sold in Australia and New Zealand, and 400,000 in total with ebooks and audio. Print sales were just below 260,000 in the U.S., after Reese Witherspoon had selected it for her book club. It is also published in another 30 territories.

== Reception ==
The Dictionary of Lost Words was sixth on the list of Australian fiction bestsellers for 2020. As of 18 January 2021 it had sold more than 100,000 copies, and by 2023 had sold 300,000 copies in Australia as well as having many translations published in other countries. It also became a New York Times bestseller, and was the first Australian novel to be selected for Reese Witherspoon's Book Club.

In reviewing the book for The Sydney Morning Herald, Jo Case says "In The Dictionary of Lost Words, Pip Williams combines the storytelling scale and intimate detail of a 19th-century novel with the sensibility of now – and a cast of richly realised characters and relationships that are a pleasure to spend time with". A write-up in the Kirkus Reviews said that "The result is a satisfying amalgam of truth and historical fiction". Other reviewers discussed the novel's elevation of language, with Book Reporter referring to it as "the novel [word lovers and linguists] have been waiting for without even realizing it" and Booklover Book Reviews saying it "reminds us of the power of words, to harm and control, but also to bridge gaps, to empower and to bring about change for the better".

== Awards ==
Year	Award	Category	Result	Ref
2020	ARA Historical Novel Prize	Adult	Longlisted	
2021	Australian Book Industry Awards	General Fiction Book of the Year	Won	
2021	Goodreads Choice Award	Historical Fiction	Nominated–7th	
2021	Indie Book Awards	Book of the Year	Won	
2021	Indie Book Awards	Debut Fiction	Won	
2021	International Dublin Literary Award	—	Longlisted	
2021	MUD Literary Prize	—	Won	
2021	NSW Premier's Literary Awards	Christina Stead Prize for Fiction	Shortlisted	
2021	NSW Premier's Literary Awards	People's Choice Award	Won	
2021	Walter Scott Prize	—	Shortlisted	

== Adaptations ==
- A stage adaption of the book, scripted by South Australian playwright Verity Laughton in consultation with Williams, was produced by the State Theatre Company of South Australia and the Sydney Theatre Company, directed by Jessica Arthur. After premiering at the Dunstan Playhouse in Adelaide on 22 September 2023, the play had a season at the Sydney Opera House. South Australian actor Tilda Cobham-Hervey played Esme.
- It was announced in November 2022 that a collaboration between filmmakers Lisa Scott of Highview Productions and Rebecca Summerton of Closer Productions (who in 2019 collaborated on The Hunting) had bought the rights to adapt the book for a television series. Williams is co-executive producer, along with Alex Dimos and Andrew Nunn, while Anton Andreacchio is producer of the series.
