= Things I Know to Be True =

Play by Andrew Bovell

- Original language: English
- Written by: Andrew Bovell
- Characters: Fran Price, Bob Price, Rosie Price, Mark/Mia Price, Ben Price, Pip Price
- Genre: Family drama
- Setting: Adelaide South Australia

Premiere
- Date: May 2016
- Place: Adelaide South Australia

Things I Know to Be True is a play by Andrew Bovell that premiered in May 2016 and was performed by The State Theatre Company South Australia. It has also been performed in Britain by Frantic Assembly, in Sydney at the New Theatre (2022), in the United States in a co-production with the Milwaukee Repertory Theatre and the Arizona Theatre Company (2019), in Canada at the CAA Theatre, and in translation in Spain. The play is naturalistic but features great use of non-naturalistic physical movement to emphasise the emotional connection between the characters - following the story of the Price Family and their problems.

The play is set in Adelaide, Australia, which is where the play held its World Premiere in May 2016. For the American production, Bovell adapted the action of the drama to take place in the Midwestern United States.

== Plot ==
Things I Know to Be True follows the story and the many struggles of the Price family. The play begins with a monologue from Rosie Price on a European getaway during her gap-year. She reveals that she had fallen in love with a man called Emmanuel while she was in Berlin, but found that he'd stolen most of her valuables and run away when she woke up one night, forcing her to return to Australia.

When Rosie returns home, the rest of the family come to meet her. We learn that Pip, Rosie's elder sister, has decided to leave her husband and two children behind to live in Vancouver; her mother, Fran, disapproves, especially after she found out that Pip had been cheating on her husband. Later in the play, Pip has moved to Vancouver and had written a letter to Fran, finally emotionally connecting with her after a rather abusive childhood.

The Price's second child, Mia (previously referred to as Mark) declares himself transgender and announces his plans for his transition, which include his plan to move to Sydney to begin transgender hormone therapy. This comes as a shock to the rest of the family, with Fran and Bob (his father), again being particularly displeased. This scene is the last time in which we see Mia present as male, with him presenting as a woman in his later appearances.

Fran had been saving around $250,000 as a get-out fund for her relationship with Bob, stating that it is "hard to love someone for 30 years straight" and citing her fear of being trapped in a loveless marriage like her own mother. She admits to Bob that she once thought of running away—as Pip had just done—but stayed together for the sake of their children, which Bob admits to have known and reveals that Rosie was not an accident—as previously alluded to earlier in the play—but an intentional “mistake” to prevent the divorce. Fran then says that she now saves it for them to treat themselves. She asks Bob where he'd most like to go and he replies Kruger National Park. To his surprise, she agrees to go, yet they never do.

The final sub-plot of this play is centered around the younger son, Ben, and his father, Bob. Bob finds a European car parked outside; it turns out to be Ben's and Bob wants to know how he found the money, with Ben answering that he worked hard for it. This appears to be insignificant, until later in the play Ben returns home while high, and reveals that he had been skimming money from his clients, and that's where he'd received the money for the drugs and flashy car.

As all this is happening, however, tragedy strikes. It is revealed that Fran had been involved in a car crash and was pronounced dead on arrival at the hospital which she worked at as a nurse. She passes away without reconciling with Mia, emotionally connecting with Pip in person, forgiving Ben and taking Bob to South Africa. The children return to Adelaide to meet Bob and Rosie for Fran's funeral.

== Cast and characters ==
Cast
Role	Adelaide	UK	USA	USA East Coast	Spain	Canada	Melbourne	Character notes
Fran Price	Eugenia Fragos	Imogen Stubbs	Jordan Baker	Corinna May		Seana Mckenna	Belinda McClory	Fran Price is the mother of the Price Family. Fran is a senior nurse and is the only working parent in the Price Family. During the play, she reveals that she has a secret stash of cash hidden away for post-retirement, but, in a revelation, she revealed that it was originally a 'get-out clause' for her relationship with Bob. During the same speech, she admits that she loved another man, but never slept with him and stuck with Bob for the sake of her children. It is revealed that she died in an MVC in the final scene of the play.
Bob Price	Paul Blackwell	Ewan Stewart	Bill Geisslinger	John Wojda		Tom McCamus	Ben Grant	Bob Price is the father of the Price Family and is retired. He has retired earlier than anticipated, due to his taking of a redundancy package that the car company he was previously working for offered him. He is perhaps best known for his comedic interruptions in what is otherwise a more serious play, such as asking Fran if she had used his secateurs during a heated argument. Due to his unemployment, Bob has become a very keen gardener and is also a family man. His prized possessions are his children and his plants, in particular, his roses, which are a subject of a few satirical arguments between him and his wife. Bob is distraught when Fran dies and tears the plants that he has spent so long nurturing from the ground in a fit of anger.
Rosie Price	Tilda Cobham-Hervey	Kirsty Oswald	Aubyn Heggie	Raya Malcolm	Candela Salguero		Eva Rees	Rosie Price is the youngest daughter of the Price Family, aged 19. She does not know who she wants to be yet and begins the play stating that she had just come back from a European adventure in Berlin, where she met a man called Emmanuel and was walked out on. As she uncertain about her future, Fran and Bob see her as the opportunity to carry on their legacy the way they want to, keeping her close and always in contact. However, she reveals that she wants to move to Brisbane, thus breaking Bob's heart.
Pip Price	Georgia Adamson	Natalie Casey	Kelley Faulkner	Liz Hayes			Brigid Gallacher	Pip Price is the eldest child in the Price Family and is an education bureaucrat. She had two daughters with her partner, Steve, but later reveals that she has fallen in love with another man whom she met at a conference in Vancouver, who is also married. She feels distanced from her mother as she always felt like she was the least favoured sibling, linked to the fact that her mother pulled her hair when she was fourteen.
Mark/Mia Price	Tim Walters	Matthew Barker	Kevin Kantor	Jo Michael Rezes			Tomáš Kantor	Mark Price is the eldest son and the second child of the Price Family and is an IT Specialist. Mark comes out as transgender in the second half of the play and announces an intention to move to Sydney for hormonal treatment, announcing that her name is Mia instead of "Mark". Bob and Fran greet the news with shock and hostility. Rosie helps Mia pack and they exchange watches: at this point, it appears that Rosie is the only one who sympathises. Mia appears as a woman in the end scene ready for the funeral of her mother, with whom she never reconciled. Both Kevin Kantor and Jo Michael Rezes have performed the role of Mia as openly non-binary actors within the American adaptation.
Ben Price	Nathan O'Keefe	Richard Mylan	Zach Fifer	David Keohane			Joss McClelland	Ben Price is the youngest son in the Price Family. He is a financial services officer. At first, he appears to be the highest achieving of the family, but as the play continues it is revealed that Bob sees a great deal of himself within Ben. This relationship crumbles, however, as Bob discovers that Ben has been skimming, amounting to a total of $250,000. The two characters end up in a physical fight, removing both characters of their innocence.

== Soundtrack ==
The UK production of Things I Know to Be True featured a soundtrack composed by Nils Frahm. Frahm's pieces, selected from his catalogue by directors Scott Graham and Geordie Brookman in conjunction with sound designer Andrew Howard, have one prominent instrument; the piano. Frahm ensures that the piano's chords reflect the mood of the current scene, using minor keys for sadder scenes and slightly jazzier tones for happier ones.

Aside from Frahm's soundtrack, the work of Leonard Cohen is mentioned many times; coincidentally he died just a few days before the first performance at the Chichester Minerva Theatre. His song 'Famous Blue Raincoat' is featured during Pip's letter to Fran, where she explains that it used to be Fran and Bob's song that they loved. Here are the lyrics from Cohen's hit that were adapted to fit the letter:

It's four in the morning, the end of December
I'm writing you now just to see if you're better
New York is cold, but I like where I'm living.
There's music on Clinton Street all through the evening.

I hear that you're building your little house deep in the desert.
You're living for nothing now, I hope you're keeping some kind of record.

Yes, and Jane came by with a lock of your hair
She said that you gave it to her
That night that you planned to go clear
Did you ever go clear?

== Inspirations ==
The following is a list of mediums that Andrew Bovell has named as inspirations when writing, or rehearsing Things I Know to Be True:

Medium	Produced By	Type of Medium	Inspiration Within the Plot
Araby	James Joyce	Short Story	Rosie's trip to Europe
Twilight	Gregory Crewdson	Visual Art	The relationship between Pip, Rosie and Fran
Beneath the Roses	Gregory Crewdson	Visual Art	The relationship between Pip, Rosie and Fran
Muhammad Ali vs Sonny Liston	Neil Leifer	Image	Bob's fight with Ben
Just, Radiohead	Jamie Thraves	Music Video	Pip sitting in the garden
Ozymandias	Percy Bysshe Shelley	Sonnet	Bob's Roses
The Birthday	Chagall	Painting	Bob and Fran's Dance
Witness	Peter Weir	Film	Not Said
Stop Making Sense	Talking Heads & Jonathan Demme	Film	Not Said
Krapp's Last Tape	Samuel Beckett	Play	Not Said

== Critical reception ==
Things I Know to Be True has widely received good reviews, with the average rating at around three and a half stars out of five. The US East Coast premiere of the play, directed by Judy Braha at Great Barrington Public Theater in July 2022, received regional acclaim garnering two Berkshire Theatre Critics Awards nominations for Outstanding Supporting Actress (Corinna May as Fran) and Outstanding Supporting Actor (Jo Michael Rezes as Mia).

The Guardian described the Frantic Assembly production as "a pleasure to watch", and the Radio Times stated that "It is a rare thing for a suburban family drama to resonate quite as acutely and uncomfortably as Things I Know to Be True", describing it as an "understated gem". What's On Stage praised Bovell's writing ability as "good on the daily frictions of life".

== Television adaptation ==
In October 2020, it was reported that a television series adaptation of the play is in development from Blossom Films, a production company owned by Nicole Kidman and Per Saari, for Amazon. Andrew Bovell would serve as an executive producer alongside Kidman and Per Saari for Blossom Films, Amanda Higgs and Alastair McKinnon for Matchbox Pictures, and Jan Chapman for Jan Chapman Films.
