= Moment Factory =

Canadian multimedia entertainment studio

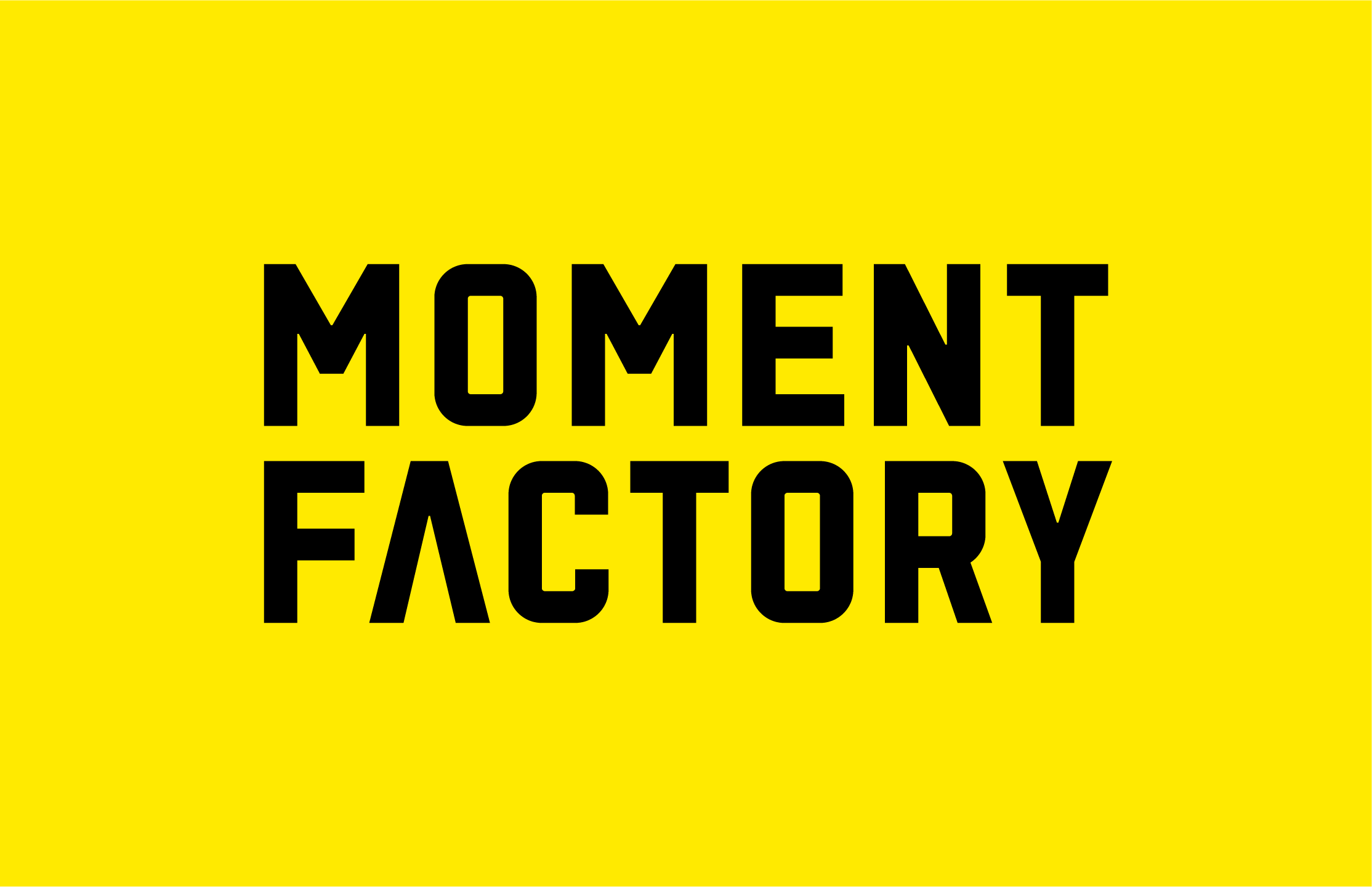
- Company type: Private company
- Industry: New media & entertainment
- Founded: 2001
- Founder: Dominic Audet; Sakchin Bessette; Jason Rodi
- Headquarters: Montreal, Quebec, Canada
- Area served: Worldwide
- Key people: Dominic Audet, Cofounder and Chief of Innovation Sakchin Bessette, Cofounder and Creative and Executive Director
- Number of employees: 400

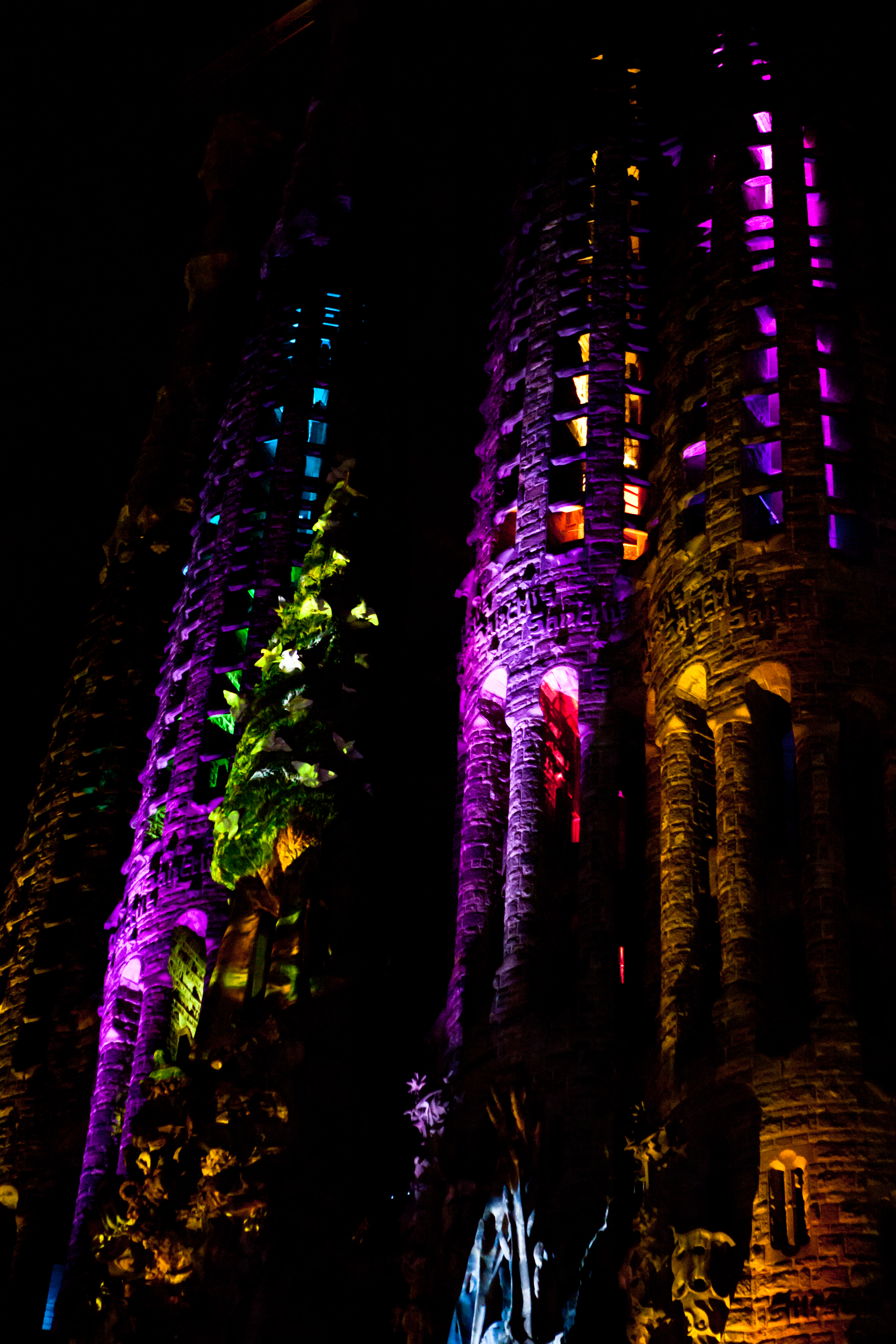
Projection mapping created by Moment Factory at the facade of the Sagrada Família in 2012.

Moment Factory is a multimedia entertainment studio specializing in the design and production of immersive environments, combining video, lighting, architecture, sound, and special effects. Headquartered in Montreal, the studio also has offices in Paris, Tokyo, New York and Singapore. Since its inception in 2001, Moment Factory has created 550 shows worldwide, including the Lumina Night Walks.

== Team ==
Moment Factory's team consists of graphic and motion designers, multimedia directors, illustrators, architects, lighting designers, musicians, environment designers, producers, programmers, engineers, technicians and developers. Key people are Dominic Audet, cofounder and chief of innovation; and Sakchin Bessette, cofounder, creative and executive director.
