= Co3 Contemporary Dance =

Co3 Contemporary Dance (pron. Koh-three) (also known as Co3 Australia) is a contemporary dance company based on the lands of the Whadjuk Nyoongar people in Perth, Western Australia. It is the State's premier contemporary dance company and is in residence at the State Theatre Centre of WA.

The company was formed in 2014 from the former Buzz Dance Theatre and STEPS Youth Dance Theatre with Raewyn Hill in the role of artistic director. Hill had previously been at Dancenorth and drew upon her connections there in the creation of the new company.
