= Raewyn Hill =

New Zealand choreographer and dancer (born 1972)

- Born: 1972 (age 53–54); Oamaru, New Zealand
- Education: New Zealand School of Dance
- Occupations: Dancer, choreographer, artistic director
- Career
- Current group: Co3 Contemporary Dance, Western Australia
- Former groups: Dancenorth, Queensland, Australia

Raewyn Hill (born 1972) is a New Zealand choreographer and dancer now active in Australia.

== Career ==
Hill was born in Oamaru and entered the New Zealand School of Dance when she was fifteen, graduating in 1992. She has worked with Sue Healey and Garry Stewart's dance company Thwack. She performed as a dancer in various productions including Xena: Warrior Princess and the BBC's The Lost World. Her last performance was the solo production We are gathered here today. Hill retired from performing in 2006. She provided choreography for the TVNZ series Rude Awakenings in 2008 and also provided advice to the producers of the New Zealand's So You Think You Can Dance. Hill has been a guest teacher and choreographer for Royal New Zealand Ballet, Footnote Dance, New Zealand School of Dance, Beijing Dance Academy, Western Australian Academy of Performing Arts and Tasdance.In 2001, she formed Soapbox Productions, which toured New Zealand, performing eight full-length works. After she married dancer Richard Longbottom, it was renamed Raewyn Hill and Dancers. She established her own dance company New Zealand Dance Theatre.

Hill was artist in residence at the Hong Kong Academy for Performing Arts from 2007 to 2009. From August to October 2009, she took up a further artist in residence position at Cité Internationale des Arts in Paris and in August 2010, another position at Baryshnikov Arts Center.

In 2010, she became artistic director for Dancenorth in North Queensland. In 2014, she became artistic director of the new Contemporary Dance Company of Western Australia.

In April 2020, Hill said about her work:

I don’t consider it a passion: I consider it my life – my reason for existence– my reason for being. When I am in performance, dance is the settling of my “self”. I’m in harmony; I’m truthful; I am complete. Now, in my role as an artistic director, I have a deep sense of responsibility and desire to leverage my position in the community to empower, support and nurture our next generation of artists, be it through my choreographic practice, my pedagogy or my role as a director.

== Notable works ==
Hill's notable works include:

- When love comes calling (2002)
- Angels with dirty feet (2004)
- We are gathered here today (2006)
- Mercy: A dance for the forgotten (2007)
- The Cry (2010)
- Carnivale.4 (2020)

== Publications ==
- Hopper, Luke S.; Blevins, Peta; Erskine, Shona; Hendry, Danica; Hill, Raewyn; Longbottom, Richard (2020). "Sustaining dancer wellbeing through independent professional dance careers". Theatre, Dance and Performance Training. 11 (4). doi:10.1080/19443927.2020.1740312.
