= Verity Laughton =

Australian playwright

- Born: 1952 (age 73–74)
- Writing career
- Notable work: The Mourning After
- Website: www.veritylaughton.com

Verity Laughton (born 1952) is a South Australian writer, editor, and playwright.

== Early life and education ==
Laughton was born in Adelaide in 1952. She was educated at the University of Adelaide, graduating with a BA (Hons) in 1973. As a student she appeared in several plays produced by the university's dramatic society. She then completed a Diploma in Library Studies at the South Australian Institute of Technology (incorporated in the University of South Australia in 1991) in 1975.

Laughton was awarded a PhD by Flinders University for her thesis "Depicting the Gorgon: the making of theatre about historic-political trauma".

== Career ==
Following graduation, Laughton worked at the State Library of South Australia as a librarian for two years, while co-editing Ash Magazine, a literary magazine. She filled several roles in support of Writers Week at the Adelaide Festivals from 1982 to 1986.

Laughton wrote her first play, I Saw a Dinosaur, in 1987. Numerous plays have followed. The Mourning After, which premiered in 1996 directed by Tony Sheldon and starring Nancye Hayes, was described as "a compelling theatrical experience". She later adapted Patricia Wrightson's The Nargun and the Stars for the stage. It premiered at the 2009 Sydney Festival at the Riverside Theatres Parramatta and was considered "a vividly memorable creation".

Most recently, in 2023 her adaptation of The Dictionary of Lost Words by Pip Williams. It premiered at the State Theatre Company of South Australia, before transferring to the Sydney Theatre Company and then Arts Centre Melbourne. The production was described as "a very clever realisation...and gives great power to key moments of this epic story".

She has also written poetry and short stories.

Australia's premier Chamber Music concert tour organisation, Musica Viva Australia, has programmed a national tour of Australia's major cities during 2027 by French-Italian mezzo-soprano Lea Dessandre and French lutenist Thomas Dunford. One of Laughton's poems, a re-imagining of Shakespeare's play The Tempest, has recently been set to as-yet unnamed music by Australian composer Alice Chance. Chance's musical composition, commissioned by Musica Viva and featuring Laughton's poetry, will receive its world premiere performances during 2027 courtesy of Dessandre and Dunford.

== Selected works ==
- I Saw a Dinosaur, 1987
- The Ballad of Bonnie Wheeler, 1988
- Imagine the Night Sky, 1989
- Bad Luck Clancy!, 1991
- Artizane, 1992
- Tales at Tarpeena, 1993
- Carrying Light, 1995
- The Mourning After, Currency Press, 1996
- Burning, Australian Plays, 2001
- The Lightkeeper, Australian Plays, 2003
- The Fox, 2003 (radio play)
- Davy, 2008 (radio play)
- Moon Door, 2008 (radio play)
- The Nargun and the Stars, 2009 (adapted from the book by Patricia Wrightson)
- The Sweetest Thing, Australian Plays, 2010
- The Red Cross Letters, 2016
- Long Tan, Currency Press, 2017
- The Dictionary of Lost Words, 2023 (adapted from the book by Pip Williams)

== Awards and recognition ==
- 1995 shortlisted for the Australian National Playwrights' Centre New Dramatists Exchange
- 2001 winner, Griffin Award for New Australian Playwriting for Burning
- 2004 winner, AWGIE Awards Stage Award for Community Theatre for The Lightkeeper
- 2004 winner, AWGIE Awards Radio Award for Original for The Fox
- 2011 highly commended, Blake Poetry Prize for "The Fox Man"
- 2012 shortlisted, New South Wales Premier's Literary Awards, Nick Enright Prize for Playwriting for The Sweetest Thing
- 2023 shortlisted, Text Prize for Young Adult and Children's Writing for "Una and the Many worlds of Dream"
