= Patch Theatre Company =

Theatre company performing children's theatre in Adelaide, South Australia

- Formerly: Little Patch Theatre; New Patch Theatre
- Industry: Theatre
- Founded: 1972; 54 years ago
- Founder: Morna Jones
- Headquarters: Adelaide, South Australia, Australia
- Key people: Geoff Cobham (artistic director)
- Products: Stage productions
- Website: www.patchtheatre.org.au

Patch Theatre Company, formerly Little Patch Theatre and then New Patch Theatre, commonly known as Patch, is an Australian theatre company specialising in children's theatre, based in Adelaide, South Australia. Founded in 1972 by Morna Jones, the company is now funded by the federal government through the Creative Australia, state government, and a number of corporate and private sponsors. The company has maintained a relationship with the Adelaide Festival Centre and produced works as part of the Adelaide Festival of Arts, as well as touring widely. Patch has performed at international children's festivals around the world, and has been featured regularly at the Sydney Opera House and Victorian Arts Centre. Dave Brown was artistic director for over 20 years. Since 2018 and as of June 2025, Geoff Cobham has led the company as artistic director.

== History ==
Patch Theatre Company was founded in 1972 by Morna Jones, a performer and television producer who had worked extensively with children during her career. Morna and her husband Neil Jones established Little Patch Theatre in an old farmhouse in High Street, Brighton and its theatrical mainstay was puppetry. The theatre grew and its name changed first to New Patch Theatre, then The Patch Theatre Centre, and finally to Patch Theatre Company. It is commonly known as just Patch.

Following Jones' death in 1982, Christine Anketell was appointed to lead the company, and its profile grew. Under her direction, Patch's repertoire diversified and its audience base was extended. For the first time the company toured extensively throughout South Australia and Victoria. The company also undertook its first international tour, performing in Japan as part of the Okayama Festival. During her seven years as artistic director, Anketell developed a relationship with the Adelaide Festival Centre Trust, which saw the realisation of large-scale adaptations of children's literature as well as developing its extensive non-metropolitan tours to schools and community centres. Highlights included Wilfred Gordon McDonald Partridge which had seasons at Expo 88 in Brisbane and the Malthouse in Melbourne, The Secret Garden which headlined the Canberra Festival and Gillian Rubinstein's Space Demons.

Dave Brown joined the company in 1992 and continued to foster the Adelaide Festival Centre relationship. In all, he led the company for around 20 years. In a co-production with the Festival Centre, Brown staged Victor Kelleher's The Red King in the Space Theatre in August 1993.

Under Brown, in 1994, Patch moved from its base in the Community Centre in Tarlton Street, Somerton Park, to become a part of the Pasadena High School campus. In March that year, his work Rak Awin explored the sharing of Aboriginal Australian culture through theatre. Further co-productions with the Adelaide Festival Centre Trust continued, with Gillian Rubinstein's Galax-Arena and Each Beach in 1995 and 1997 respectively.

He collaborated with radio station Triple J to produce Respectable Shoes as a rock concert in 1997, as part of "Take Over 97" (formerly the Australian Festival for Young People) in Elder Park, alongside the River Torrens. Also at the festival, Patch presented The Boy with the Bamboo Flute, a collaboration with Vietnamese-Australian artists Ta Duy Binh and Dang Thao Nguyen, which continued to be performed until 2006. Brown's work reflected his interest in exploring new conventions for the use of music in theatre, including the Beatlesque pop-opera Kookookachoo.

From 1998 to 2000, Patch returned to its roots in puppetry, led by new artistic director Ken Evans. The Adelaide Festival Centre Trust and Come Out '99 presented Ken Evans' and Jonathan Taylor's Visible Darkness, a "collision of film noir, contemporary dance, puppetry and illusion".

In 2000, Brown returned to the company and set about developing a repertoire of in-theatre productions exclusively for 4-8 year olds and their families, such as Emily Loves To Bounce. The show was based on three books by author/illustrator Stephen Michael Kin: Henry and Amy; Emily Loves to Bounce; and A Special Kind of Love. Brown also adapted many stories by celebrated children's author, Pamela Allen, including Who Sank the Boat?, Mr McGee and the Biting Flea, and A Lion in the Night. Emily loves to Bounce, Me and My Shadow, and The Moon's A Balloon were non-verbal pieces. The award-winning Me and My Shadow (2016) was directed by Roz Hervey.

Under Brown, Patch performed at international children's festivals in Korea, Japan, Singapore, United States, New Zealand, and Canada, and has been featured regularly at the Sydney Opera House and Victorian Arts Centre. The company's work was also presented in New York City at the New Victory Theater, and the Kennedy Center in Washington D.C. over two seasons each. The company also presented several national Playing Australia tours. In 2015 Brown stepped down as artistic director. In the same year, he received the Mickey Minor Lifetime Achievement Award for Sustained Excellence from IPAY, an international organisation supporting the performing arts for young audiences in North America. He went on to establish an international platform for theatre-makers of children's theatre. In 2020, he was inducted into the Adelaide Festival Centre's Walk of Fame

In May 2016, Patch Theatre Company worked with Federation University Australia to bring the "impossibility" of balloons to stage.

In March 2018, Patch presented Can You Hear Colour, an introduction to music and opera for youngsters. In 2019, Roz Hervey returned to direct the award-winning Zooom.

Under Geoff Cobham's direction from October 2018, the company started moving towards smaller scale shows. Instead of large audiences watching two shows a day, it has been producing short-form "immersive worlds" for small number of children, repeated up to 22 times in a day. In 2024, Patch attracted audiences totalling over 76,000.

In July 2025, the company tours Taiwan, as well as several cities and towns in South Australia.

== Funding and governance ==
In 1977 Patch became a general grant company of the Australia Council for the Arts. Later, the company received regular assistance from the State Government through the Youth Performing Arts Council, which was the body responsible for oversight of Carclew Youth Arts Centre.

As of 2023, the company is funded by the state and Commonwealth Governments through Creative Australia (formerly Australia Council), its arts funding and advisory body, as well as the James and Diana Ramsay Foundation as well as corporate and private sponsors. In 2023 the company created a new strategic plan for 2025–28 as part of an application for the renewal of their four-year funding through Creative, which was successful. Arts SA and Carclew were responsible for the state funding arrangements, until the company was transferred to the Department of Education in 2018 by the Marshall government. In July 2019, the state budget slashed funding to the History Trust, Carclew, and Windmill, as part of "operational efficiency" cuts.

== Key people ==
Patch Theatre Company was founded in 1972 by Morna Jones. After her death in 1982, Christine Anketell was appointed to lead the company. Dave Brown joined the company in 1992, leading it over several years until 1998, when Ken Evans was appointed artistic director. In 2000, Brown returned to the company. In 2015 Brown stepped down as artistic director, with Naomi Edwards taking over the role for the following two years.

Geoff Cobham, former resident lighting designer of the State Theatre Company of South Australia (STCSA), took on the role of artistic director of Patch in October 2018. Prior to STCSA, he had served as associate director at Force Majeure dance company for 10 years, and has also managed various aspects of festivals such as the Adelaide Festival, Sydney Festival, and WOMADelaide. He is the father of actress and filmmaker Tilda Cobham-Hervey, and was married to Roz Hervey, creative producer for Restless Dance Company, until her death in November 2024.

As of June 2025, Sasha Zahra is creative producer, and Penny Camens is general manager of Patch.

== Selected works ==
Me and My Shadow was first performed at The Forge at Marryatville High School in May 2010, and over the following decade was presented around Australia as well as in the United States. It toured regional SA in 2020.

Zooom has toured Australia, Canada, and the US since premiering at the Space Theatre in July–August 2019. It was also performed at the DreamBIG Festival in May 2021, and won the 2021 Ruby Award for Best Work, Event or Project for Young People.

Other works by Patch include:

- Emily Loves to Bounce
- Pigs, Bears & Billy Goats Gruff
- Sharon, Keep Ya Hair On!
- Special Delivery
- Who Sank the Boat?
- Mr. Mcgee and the Biting Flea
- Aesop's Fables
- A Lion in the Night
- Can You Hear Colour
- Firefly Forest
- Home
- I Wish...
- Little Green Tractor
- The Boy and the Bamboo Flute
- The Fastest Boy in the World(2007)
- The Happiest Show on Earth
- The Lighthouse
- The Moon's a Balloon
- Yo Diddle Diddle

== Awards and nominations ==
As of 2025, Patch has won or been nominated for the following awards:

- 2011: Winner, Helpmann Award, Best Presentation for Children, for Me & My Shadow
- 2011: Nominated, Sydney Theatre Award, Best Production for Children, for Me & My Shadow
- 2013: Winner, Victor Award, Best Showcase Production IPA, for Me & My Shadow (Note: An international award given by Child's Play Touring Theatre in Chicago.)
- 2019: Winner, Adelaide Critics Circle Award & Independent Arts Foundation Award for Innovation, for ZOOOM
- 2020: Winner, Ruby Award, Best Work or Event Within a Festival, for The Lighthouse
- 2021: Winner, Ruby Award, Best Work, Event or Project for Young People, for ZOOOM
- 2022: Nominated, Sydney Theatre Award, Best Production for Children, for ZOOOM
- 2022: Nominated, Ruby Award, Best Work, Event or Project for Young People, for I Wish...
- 2024: Winner, Ruby Award, Outstanding Work, Event or Project for Young People, for Superluminal
- 2024: Nominated, Ruby Award, Outstanding Regional Event, for Spark: Glow & Tell
