= Force Majeure (dance company) =

Sydney contemporary dance company

Force Majeure is a contemporary dance and dance theatre company based in Sydney, Australia, resident at Carriageworks cultural precinct. As of 2024 its artistic director and CEO is Danielle Micich.

== History and governance ==
The company was established in 2002 by choreographer Kate Champion, along with co-founders and colleagues Roz Hervey and Geoff Cobham. Champion remained artistic director of the company until 2015.

As of November 2024 its artistic director and CEO is Danielle Micich, who was appointed AD in 2017.

== Description ==
Force Majeure is a resident company of Carriageworks in Sydney. It is a national "multidisciplinary movement-based theatre company", that often collaborates with other artists. The company runs a professional development program called INCITE as well as supporting resident artists in their Associate Artist program with mentorship, company infrastructure, and project funding.

== Notable works and other people ==
For over a decade, Adelaide dancer Roz Hervey worked closely with Force Majeure. For her performance in Kate Champion's Same, Same But Different in 2002, she received the Ausdance award for outstanding performance by a female dancer.

Geoff Cobham was associate director of the company from 2002 to 2012, before moving to Adelaide to join the State Theatre Company of South Australia as lighting designer.

Never Did Me Any Harm (2012), exploring parenting, was a joint production with Sydney Theatre Company which premiered at the Sydney Festival, and starred actors Marta Dusseldorp, Vincent Crowley, and Heather Mitchell. Dancer Sarah-Jayne Howard performed a "marvelous, rigorous, confronting solo dance work", according to Sydney Arts Guide reviewer David Kary. Champion directed the work, with Cobham responsible for set design and lighting. Andrew Upton acted as dramaturg, with Roz Hervey as associate director and Geordie Brookman as assistant director, while Max Lyandvert composed the music. The production also played at the Adelaide Festival in 2012, and was reprised in 2016, touring to regional New South Wales, Tasmania, and Victoria.

Another notable work was Nothing to Lose (2015), concerning fat bodies and featuring large-bodied performers. The work, performed as part of the Sydney Festival, was choreographed by Champion and her artistic associate, Kelli Jean Drinkwater, an internationally known "fat activist".

You Animal, You, which explored the sense of smell, also premiered at the Sydney Festival, and also starred Heather Mitchell, who co-wrote the script with artistic director Danielle Micich. The Guardian reviewer was impressed by "the birth scene, so vividly portrayed by Australian Dance Theatre's Harrison Elliot".
