= The Sydney Front =

Australian performance group (1986–1993)

The Sydney Front was an Australian performance group in existence between 1986 and 1993, with one return performance in 2004. Based in Sydney, New South Wales, they toured Australia and internationally. They became known internationally with their 1989 work The Pornography of Performance.

== History ==
The Sydney Front was formed in 1986, and was particularly known for integrating the audience into their productions.

Premiering many of their works at the Performance Space, Sydney, they toured the UK, Europe and Hong Kong.

Their work The Pornography of Performance became a cause célèbre when it was performed at London's Riverside Studios.

The group briefly reformed in 2004 to perform at the 21st birthday event for the Performance Space in Sydney.

== Members and description ==
The core of the group were performers John Baylis, Andrea Eloise, Clare Grant, Nigel Kellaway, and Chris Ryan. Kellaway had been the first Australian to train with Japanese director Tadashi Suzuki. The group combined elements of performance art and experimental theatre in their work.

Along with the work of the Wooster Group and Forced Entertainment, The Sydney Front were cited as Anglophonic examples of postdramatic theatre in the English edition of Hans-Thies Lehmann's Postdramatic Theatre, 2006.

== Recognition and accolades ==
In 1999 John McCallum, theatre critic in The Australian, wrote "The Sydney Front is still Australia's most influential contemporary performance company, although they disbanded in 1993".

A two-DVD set and streaming program, Staging the Audience: The Sydney Front, documenting The Sydney Front's work, was released by Artfilms in 2012.

== Major works ==
The Sydney Front's major works included:

- Waltz, 70-minute theatre work, Sydney, 1987.
- John Laws/Sade, 80-minute theatre work, Sydney, 1987.
- The Pornography of Performance, 100-minute performance work, Adelaide, Sydney, 1988; Denmark, Amsterdam, Salzburg, Düsseldorf, London, 1989.
- The Burnt Wedding, 60-minute street performance, Brisbane, 1988; Sydney & European tour, 1989.
- Photocopies of God, 60-minute theatre work, Sydney, 1989.
- The Nuremberg Recital, 60-minute solo theatre work by Nigel Kellaway, Sydney & Perth, 1989.
- Prescripts, 30-minute theatre work, Sydney 1990.
- Woman in the Wall, 50-minute solo theatre work by Clare Grant, Sydney & Auckland, 1990.
- Don Juan, 85-minute theatre work, Sydney 1991.
- First and Last Warning, theatre work, Sydney, 1992.
- Techno/Dumb/Show, video work by John Gillies and The Sydney Front, 1991.
- Passion, theatre work, Sydney, 1993
