= Pip Williams (author) =

Australian writer (born 1969)

- Born: 1969 (age 56–57); London, England, UK
- Occupations: Writer; Social researcher
- Writing career
- Genres: Literary fiction, historical fiction
- Works: The Dictionary of Lost Words (2020); The Bookbinder of Jericho (2023); The German Ward (2026)

Pip Williams (born 1969) is an Australian author and social researcher. She is best known for her debut novel The Dictionary of Lost Words, published in 2020 and later adapted for the stage. Her second novel, The Bookbinder of Jericho, was published in 2023, and her third, The German Ward, was published in September 2026.

== Early life and education ==
Pip Williams was born in London, England, in 1969. Her Brazilian mother worked part-time as a hairdresser and her Welsh father was a computer analyst who also wrote children's books. Williams moved with her parents and younger sister to Sydney, New South Wales, in 1972.

She attended Mackellar Girls' High School and grew up on the Northern Beaches of Sydney. When she was 15, a poem she wrote was published in Dolly magazine. She learnt at the age of 17 that she was dyslexic.

After graduating from secondary school, Williams took a gap year in Europe, returning in 1988. She studied science, psychology, and sociology at the Mitchell College of Advanced Education in Bathurst. She later earned a PhD in public health, focusing on older women and disabled people, at the University of Adelaide.

== Career ==
Williams worked as a social researcher at the Centre for Work and Life at the University of South Australia, where her manager was economist Barbara Pocock. During this time she co-authored Time Bomb: Work, Rest and Play in Australia Today (NewSouth Publishing, 2012), with Barbara Pocock and Natalie Skinner. She did radio production for Radio Northern Beaches and started publishing creative non-fiction in and The Australian and InDaily after moving to Adelaide in 2003.

After moving to Italy for a six-month stint in the 2010s and working on organic farms, Williams worked as a community planner at Adelaide City Council. While there she helped found the Adelaide City Library. In 2017, she published One Italian Summer, an autobiographical account of her family's time spent in Italy.

Williams wrote much of her first novel, The Dictionary of Lost Words, in the State Library of South Australia, based on her research in the Oxford English Dictionary archives. It was published in March 2020, and was sixth on the list of Australian fiction bestsellers in the year of publication. It was well-reviewed, sold well, and won several awards, including General Fiction Book of the Year in the Australian Book Industry Awards and the Christina Stead Prize for Fiction at the New South Wales Premier's Literary Awards. It was later adapted for the stage by Verity Laughton, and a TV series is being made of the novel.

Williams' second novel is The Bookbinder of Jericho, which she started writing before Dictionary was published. Also set in Oxford, during the First World War, the story centres on two sisters who work at a book bindery. It has been described as a companion to the first novel, as several characters from The Dictionary of Lost Words also appear in The Bookbinder of Jericho. In May 2024 The Bookbinder of Jericho was awarded General Fiction Book of the Year at the Australian Book Industry Awards. Verity Laughton adapted the novel for the stage which premiered in 2027 at the Sydney Theatre Company.

Williams' third novel, The German Ward, was published on 29 September 2026. It features Tilda Taylor, a character from her earlier novels, who is an actress, a suffragette, and a volunteer nurse in the First World War.

== Personal life ==
Williams met her partner, Shannon, when she was 19, and they have two sons. They moved from Sydney to a hobby farm in the Adelaide Hills in 2003, with Williams working in the city. They then went Italy for six months with their sons to work as WWOOFers (Willing Workers on Organic Farms), working in Tuscany, Calabria, and Piedmont.

As of 2024 Williams lives in the Adelaide Hills.

She has dyslexia and dysgraphia.

== Bibliography ==
- One Italian Summer: Across the World and Back in Search of the Good Life. Melbourne: Affirm Press. 2017.
- The Dictionary of Lost Words. Affirm Press. 2020.
- The Bookbinder of Jericho. Affirm Press. 2023, published as The Bookbinder. Ballantine Books. 2023. ISBN 978-0-593-60044-3 in North America.
- The German Ward. Affirm Press. 2026. ISBN 978-1-923135-44-4, to be published as A Portrait of Desire. Ballantine Books. 2027. ISBN 979-8-217-48120-0 in North America.
