= Frantic Assembly =

British theatre company

Frantic Assembly is a theatre production company. They have worked in over 40 countries and are widely studied as practitioners for A-Levels in the UK.

== Background ==
Frantic Assembly was formed by three students of Swansea University in 1994. None of the three studied drama but were inspired by theatre and wanted to create their own unique company. They wanted to create non-realistic pieces through much movement and music, although they have always said this should never stray from the storyline.

Their most notable production, in cooperation with The National Theatre, is The Curious Incident Of The Dog In The Night-Time, which won a Tony award for Best Play in 2015. In 2016, Frantic Assembly collaborated with State Theatre South Australia and Andrew Bovell to create Things I Know To Be True. They toured Australia (2016) and the UK (2016 and 2017).

In 2018, Frantic Assembly launched a podcast with guest appearances from old-school teachers of Scott Graham, Simon Stephens and Karl Hyde from Underworld.

Production Name	Year Performed	Music By	Written By
Look Back In Anger	1994		John Osborne, adapted by Spencer Hazel
Klub	1995		Devised by Frantic Assembly
Flesh	1996	Various	Devised by Frantic Assembly
Zero	1997	N/A	Devised by Frantic Assembly
Sell Out	1998		Michael Wynne
Hymns	1999	Various	Chris O'Connell
Underworld	2001	Various	Nicola McCartney
Tiny Dynamite	2001	Various	Abi Morgan
Heavenly	2002	Various	Scott Graham, Steven Hoggett, Liam Steel
Peepshow	2002	Lamb	Isabel Wright
Rabbit	2003	Deadly Avenger	Brendan Cowell
On Blindness	2004	Various	Glyn Cannon
Dirty Wonderland	2005	Goldfrapp	Devised by Frantic Assembly, scripted by Michael Wynne
Pool (No Water)	2006	Imogen Heap	Mark Ravenhill
Stockholm	2007	Various	Bryony Lavery
Othello	2008	Hybrid	William Shakespeare (edited by Scott Graham & Steven Hoggett)
Beautiful Burnout	2010	Underworld	Bryony Lavery
Lovesong	2011	Various	Abi Morgan
Little Dogs	2012	Hybrid	Devised by Frantic Assembly
The Curious Incident of the Dog in the Night-Time	2012		A National Theatre Production based on the novel by Mark Haddon, adapted by Simon Stephens
The Believers	2014	Various	Bryony Lavery
No Way Back	2015	Various	Devised by Frantic Assembly
Things I Know to Be True	2016	Nils Frahm	Andrew Bovell
This Will All Be Gone	2017	Various	Devised by Frantic Assembly
Fatherland	2017	Karl Hyde	Scott Graham, Simon Stephens, Karl Hyde
The Unreturning	2018	Pete Malkin	Anna Jordan
Sometimes Thinking	2019	Underworld	Phil Porter
I Think We Are Alone	2020	Ella Wahlstrom	Sally Abbott
Metamorphosis	2023	Stefan Janik	Lemn Sissay, based on the Novel by Franz Kafka
Lost Atoms	2025	Various	Anna Jordan, to celebrate 30 years of the company
