= Death literacy =

Definition & significance of death literacy

Death literacy is the knowledge and practical skills people and communities use to make decisions about end-of-life care. The concept grew out of a six-year Australian research project that started in 2009. To measure death literacy, researchers developed the Death Literacy Index (DLI). A shorter nine-item version, the DLI-9, followed in 2024.
