= DreamBIG Children's Festival =

Annual festival in South Australia

DreamBIG Children's Festival, formerly Come Out Festival or Come Out Children's Festival, is a large biennial arts festival for schools and families held in South Australia.

== History ==
The festival began as the Come Out Festival in 1974 as part of the Adelaide Festival of Arts, becoming a stand-alone biennial event in 1975. The first biennial event was held at the Adelaide Festival Centre, and it has been produced by the Centre since 2015.

The festival's name was changed from "Come Out" to DreamBIG Children's Festival in 2017, when the organisers decided the term was no longer appropriate due to its meaning for the LGBTI community. More than 2 million children have participated in the Festival since 1974.

It celebrates its 50th anniversary in May 2025.

== Artists and companies ==
Artists and companies who have presented work at the Festival include:

- Australian Dance Theatre
- Black Violin
- Boori Monty Pryor
- Carclew
- Circus Monoxide
- Cirkidz
- Compagnia TPO
- D'Faces of Youth Arts
- Jumbuck Theatre
- Kevin Lock
- Slingsby
- Snuff Puppets
- State Theatre Company of South Australia
- Theatre Australia
- The Pinjarra Project
- Weeping Spoon Productions
