= Restless Dance Theatre =

Australian dance company

General information
- Name: Restless Dance Theatre
- Year founded: 1991
- Founders: Sally Chance and Tania Rose
- Principal venue: 195 Gilles Street, Adelaide, South Australia
- Website: restlessdance.org

Artistic staff
- Artistic director: Michelle Ryan (since 2013)

Restless Dance Theatre, formerly Restless Dance Company, is a dance theatre company based in the South Australian capital of Adelaide. Founded in 1991, Restless works with people with and without disability.

== History ==
The Restless Dance Company was founded in 1991 by Sally Chance and Tania Rose, when Chance, who worked in community dance, was visiting Adelaide from the UK for a project with Carclew Youth Arts Centre. Restless was incorporated in 1996. It was the first professional dance company for people with disability in Australia.

The company changed its name to Restless Dance Theatre in 2008. At that time, Ingrid Voorendt was artistic director.

Philip Channells was appointed in 2009, the first artistic director with a disability of any Australian dance company. He remained in the position until 2012.

Michelle Ryan, a dancer and choreographer with multiple sclerosis, took over the position in 2013. She had formerly been a professional dancer in the Australian Dance Theatre until six months after her MS diagnosis, when she was aged 30, and had to start using a wheelchair. In 2011 she danced again, this time using a walking stick, after being invited by Belgian choreographer Alain Platel of les ballets C de la B to both choreograph and perform a solo work for a new production, which toured Australia. In October 2015, the film Michelle's Story, made by Meryl Tankard, premiered at the Adelaide Film Festival.

Around the same time, dancer and choreographer Roz Hervey joined as creative producer, remaining in the position until her death in November 2024.

The company's ensemble has toured widely, including performances at Adelaide Festival; Sydney Festival; and Brisbane Festival, as well as in the UK and South Korea. They have collaborated with Chunky Move in Melbourne.

== Description ==
The company presents dance theatre works in multiple mediums to diverse audiences. Restless has an extensive training program for all ages, based on founder Sally Chance's dance method. Disabled and non-disabled dancers work together to choreograph work.

== Governance and funding ==
As of 2024 Restless Dance Theatre is headed by artistic director Michelle Ryan, since her appointment in 2013.

The company has been mainly funded by the Commonwealth Government through the Australia Council since its inception. In April 2020, the company heard that they had not been included in the 2021–2024 funding round by the Australian Council. Restless launched a fundraising campaign, and soon there was a new funding model. They hope that the Australia Council will restore some funding to it so that it can offer its dancers secure annual contracts.

== Notable performances ==
For the 2019 Adelaide Festival, Meryl Tankard created Zizanie for the company, which received rave reviews. Regis Lansac did the videography.

From 4 September to 2 October 2020, Restless performed "Seeing Through Darkness", inspired by Expressionist artist Georges Rouault, at the Art Gallery of South Australia (AGSA). All of the 15-minute performances were sold out, with only 10 people allowed per performance owing to social distancing restrictions in place because of the COVID-19 pandemic in Australia. AGSA had invited artistic director Michelle Ryan five years earlier, and Ryan chose nine works which focused on the human body and experience, rather than Rouault's religious works. Six dancers were accompanied by an original score by Hilary Kleinig and Emily Tulloch (of the Zephyr Quartet), with lighting designed by Geoff Cobham (artistic director of Patch Theatre) and Meg Wilson.

In March 2022 a new work created by Ryan based on her and the other dancers' own experiences, Exposed, premiered at Adelaide Festival in 2022. It was performed in the inaugural Frame Biennial of Dance in Melbourne early in 2023, before opening at the Sydney Opera House on 30 August 2023, It was described by Ryan as "an ode to vulnerability and the power of asking for help". The show was the theatre's debut at the Opera House, before travelling to the 26th Seoul International Dance Festival in Seoul, Korea, and then touring nationally. The music was composed by Hilary Kleinig and Emily Tulloch (formerly of Zephyr Quartet).

== Awards ==
=== Company ===
- 2010: Winner, Australian Dance Awards, Outstanding Achievement in Youth or Community Dance, for Bedroom Dancing
- 2017?: Winner, Adelaide Critics Circle Award, Group Award (Professional Theatre), for Intimate Space
- 2017: Winner, Ruby Award, Artistic Innovation and Enterprise, for Intimate Space
- 2017: Nomination, Helpmann Award, Best Dance Production, for Intimate Space
- 2018: Nomination, Helpmann Award, Best Dance Production, for Intimate Space
- 2017: Nomination, Ruby Award, Best New Work, for Intimate Space
- 2019: Winner, Ruby Award, Sustained Contribution by an Organisation
- 2020?: Nomination, Ruby Award, Best Work or Event outside of a Festival, for Seeing Through Darkness
- 2022: Special Commendation Ruby Award 2022 - Best Work or Event Within a Festival, for Guttered

=== Individual ===
- 2020: Jianna Georgiou, Frank Ford Memorial Young Achiever Award at the Ruby Awards
