= Dancenorth =

Coordinates: 19.26021°S 146.81368°E

Dancenorth is a contemporary dance company based in Townsville, North Queensland, Australia. Founded as the North Queensland Ballet Company in 1969, Dancenorth performs for regional, national and international audiences. Dancenorth has presented works in over 35 International Arts Festivals and venues in Australia and the world.

== The company ==
Dancenorth is a nonprofit organization managed by a board of directors. It is headquartered in the School of Arts building in Townsville City Centre. Its headquarters functions for Dancenorth both as a rehearsal space and as a 190-seat theatre in which performances may be held.

== People ==
=== Artistic Directors ===
Years	Name
1985–1994	Cheryl Stock
1995–1996	Wendy Wallace
1997	Graeme Watson
1998–2005	Jane Pirani
2005–2008	Gavin Webber
2010–2014	Raewyn Hill
2014–present	Kyle Page

=== General Managers ===
Years	Name
1985–1995	Lorna Hempstead
1996–1997	Leanne Gunnelson/Alix Rhodes
1997–1999	Joanne Keune
2000–2004	Henry Laska
2005–2006	Trevor Keeling
2007–2010	Jo Fisher
2011–2012	Peter Helft
2012–2015	Trevor Keeling
2015–2018	Deanna Smart
2018–present	Hillary Coyne

=== Dancers ===
The company currently employs seven full-time dancers.

== History ==
=== North Queensland Ballet Company ===
Both Ann Roberts, who is former Principle of the Ann Roberts School of Dancing, and parents in Townsville were concerned by the lack of opportunities for young ballet dancers in North Queensland. This led them to organize a public meeting that assessed public interest in forming a North Queensland ballet company.

The North Queensland Ballet and Dance Company was established 17 July 1969. From the first audition, 41 students were accepted.

Between 1970 and 1982, the North Queensland Ballet Company presented:

- 24 original ballets created especially for the company
- 3 productions with excerpts from full-length ballets
- 3 full-length ballets re-created for the company
- 2 historical ballets created especially for the company
- 10 one-act ballets created or re-created for the company.

From 1983 to 1984, 16 new works were created for the new profession/amateur company.

=== Dance North ===
In 1985 the company changed its name to Dance North becoming a contemporary dance institute with "a policy of all new Australian works", primarily training and performing in Townsville region but touring nationally and internationally.

1998 saw the premiere of Luuli, a collaboration between Dance North and Woomera Aboriginal Corporation which fused traditional Aboriginal dance with contemporary western dance. Luuli was watched by over 30,000 people nationally and internationally over several years.

=== Dancenorth-Australia ===
Dance North became dancenorth-australia in 2006. In 2007, it took to the streets to raise awareness of dance through their participation in local Townsville community events. On 15 February 2007, the then Governor of Queensland, Quentin Bryce AC accepted dancenorth's invitation to become the company's patron for the duration of her appointment as Governor.

=== Dancenorth ===
In 2008, Dancenorth-Australia changed its name to Dancenorth.
