= Adelaide Repertory Theatre =

Amateur theatre company in Adelaide, Australia

- Nickname: The Rep; Adelaide Rep
- Formation: 1908; 118 years ago
- Founder: Bryceson Treharne
- Founded at: Adelaide, South Australia
- Type: Nonprofit Theatre company
- Registration no.: 28 301 492 216
- Legal status: Charity (Advancing Culture)
- Headquarters: 53 Angas Street, Adelaide SA 5000
- Location: The Arts Theatre
- Coordinates: 34.93008418990483°S 138.60304485057193°E
- Chair: David Sinclair
- Vice-Chair: Gary Anderson
- Secretary: Di Thompson
- Revenue: $460,355.00 (2025)
- Expenses: $517,538.00 (2025)
- Funding: Donations, sales, grants
- Website: adelaiderep.com
- Formerly called: Adelaide Literary Theatre

The Adelaide Repertory Theatre, (often called Adelaide Rep or The Rep), is an amateur repertory theatre company in Adelaide, South Australia, founded in 1908, originally as the Adelaide Literary Theatre, changing its name in 1910. The Adelaide Rep is the oldest surviving amateur theatre company in the Southern Hemisphere. It usually presents its productions at The Arts Theatre.

== History ==
The Adelaide Literary Theatre was established in 1908, by students of the Elder Conservatorium and Welsh composer, teacher and the Conservatorium's Professor of Piano forte, Bryceson Treharne. Treharne was the theatre's first Director and Manager from 1908 until his return to the United Kingdom in 1911. In 1910, to better reflect the repertory nature of the theatre's productions, and to avoid confusion with similarly named theatre's around Australia, the theatre company changed its name to the Adelaide Repertory Theatre (or the Adelaide Rep). As of 2026, the Adelaide Rep remains the longest surviving amateur theatre company in Australia and the Southern Hemisphere.

=== Performance venues ===
On its establishment in 1908, the theatre's original performance space was in a room lent to the theatre by the Conservatorium at the University of Adelaide, with the stage reportedly made of wood planks and forms. Over the year's since 1908, the venues the company has performed at many of Adelaide's local theatres, including:

- Unley Town Hall.
- Walkerville Hall.
- Queen's Hall at 102a Grenfell Street. (later the Embassy Ballroom, Plaza Theatre, and Paris Cinema, before demolition (Note: "The Art Deco facade was created in 1935 when it became the Embassy Ballroom." It was later the Plaza Theatre, then the Paris Cinema. "...now is the site of the southern entrance to Regent Arcade".))
- King's Theatre (built 1911, on the corner of Carrington Street and King William Street, Adelaide.
- Tivoli Theatre (now Her Majesty's Theatre).
- Victoria Hall, in Gawler Place.

=== The Arts Theatre ===
In 1963, plans for a new purpose-built theatre for the Adelaide Rep were designed by Adelaide architectural firl Russel and Yelland after many years of fundraising by the theatre. The theatre was completed in 1963, with the new theatre names The Arts Theatre, located on Angas Street in the Adelaide city centre. The 500-seat theatre was built for £45,000, on land bought 15 years prior by the company. It has since become a major venue for other amateur companies as well as Adelaide Fringe and other performances. The first production there was the Peter Ustinov comedy, Romanoff and Juliet.

== Management ==
Since the establishment of the theatre in 1908, the company has been run by a board of directors. The board was originally led by Treharne along with "a small board of men from Adelaide business" with an interest in theatre, which then grew to include board members with expertise and occupations in fine arts. The board was originally charged with the management of the theatre, which included:

- Selection of Plays
- Theatre Finances
- Advertising
- Deciding the scheme of performances

=== Board Chairs ===
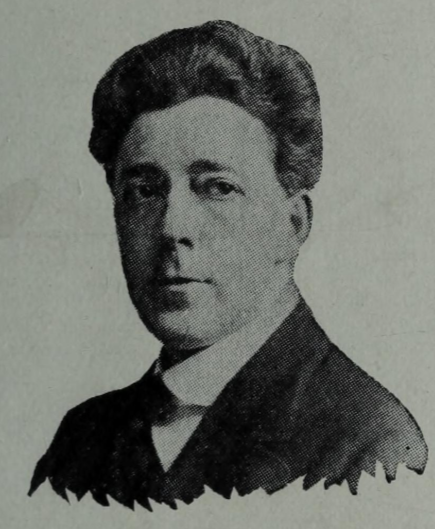
The Adelaide Rep's first Director and Manager, Bryceson Treharne.

As of 2026, the theatre's board is chaired by professional theatre state manager, David Sinclair. Past board chairs have included:

- Kenneth Litchfield, former Mayor of Prospect.
- Sir Archibald Strong, former Professor of English at the University of Adelaide.
- Ronald Finlayson, former Academic.
- Sydney Talbot Smith, former lawyer and journalist.
- Cyril Stacey, former professional actor and stage manager.
- Agnes Minnie Good (Mrs J E Good), former Red Cross leader.

== Notable people ==
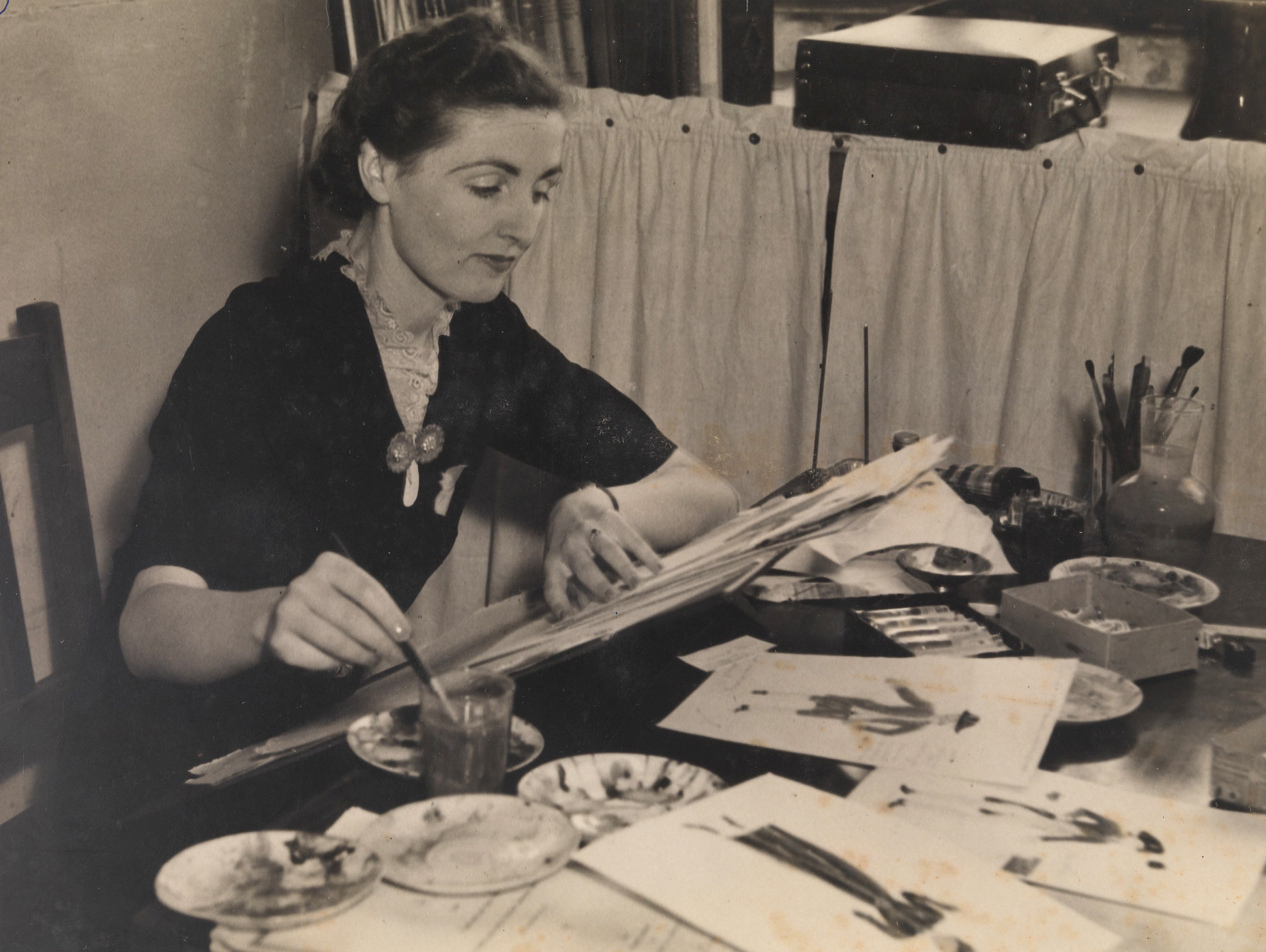
Former Adelaide Rep member, Thelma Afford (1938).

Notable associates of the Theatre since 1908 include:

- Bryceson Treharne - Composer and founder.
- Phebe Watson - Actress and founding member.
- Roxy Byrne - Actress.
- Frank Waters - Actor.
- Sir Archibald Strong - Board member.
- David Combe - Actor, also Prize for Acting.
- Minnie Martin - Costume designer and producer.
- Frank Ford AM - Director.
- Alexander Melrose - playwright and politician.
- Keith Michell - Actor.
- Jean Robertson - Actress.
- Sydney Talbot Smith - Chairperson, Vice President and President at times between 1919 and 1948.
- Terry McDermott - Actor.
- Anne Haddy - Actress.
- Adam Tuominen - Actor.
- Damon Herriman - Actor.
- Thelma Afford - Costume designer and actress.
- Andrew Clarke - Actor.
- Dame Ruby Litchfield - Director.
- Esmond George - Actor.
- Peter Goers - Director and actor.
- Neil Melville - Actor.
- Glenn Butcher - Actor and writer.
- Elspeth Ballantyne - Actress.
- Eric Nave - Actor and producer.
- Don Barker - Actor.
- Jean Robertson - Actress.
- Stella Hume - Arts director.
- Jim Daly - Actor.

== Awards ==
- 2001: Messenger Newspapers Light Year Award, for Glen Christie's performance as Norman in The Dresser.
- 2001: Messenger Newspapers Theatre Awards, for Barney in Kid Stakes won Best Amateur Actor.
- 2006: Adelaide Critics Circle The Coopers Group Award for School for Scandal.
- 2006: Messenger Newspapers Light Year Award for best comedy: I Hate Hamlet.
- 2008: Ruby Award for Sustained Contribution by an Organisation (Arts SA).
