= Beinart =

Beinart may refer to:

- Haim Beinart (1917–2010) Israeli historian and educator
- Peter Beinart (born 1971), American political pundit
- William Beinart (fl. 2000s), South African historian

== See also ==
- Beinhart (disambiguation)
