= Harvey Silbert =

American lawyer (1912–2008)

- Born: Harvey L. Silbert; June 10, 1912; Milwaukee, Wisconsin, US
- Died: September 28, 2002 (aged 90); Los Angeles, California, US
- Education: Southwestern University Law School
- Occupations: Lawyer; philanthropist
- Spouse: Lillian Schwartz (m. c. 1935)

Harvey L. Silbert (1912–2002) was an American real estate and entertainment lawyer, casino executive and philanthropist. He represented celebrities and studio executives. He was a real estate investor in Westwood, Los Angeles, and a director of casinos in Las Vegas, Nevada. He was a major donor to the Hebrew University of Jerusalem, where he brought Hollywood celebrities for fundraisers.

== Early life and education ==
Harvey Silbert was born on June 10, 1912, in Milwaukee, Wisconsin. He grew up in Boyle Heights, and he became barmitzvah at the Breed Street Shul. Silbert graduated from the Southwestern University Law School.

== Legal and business career ==
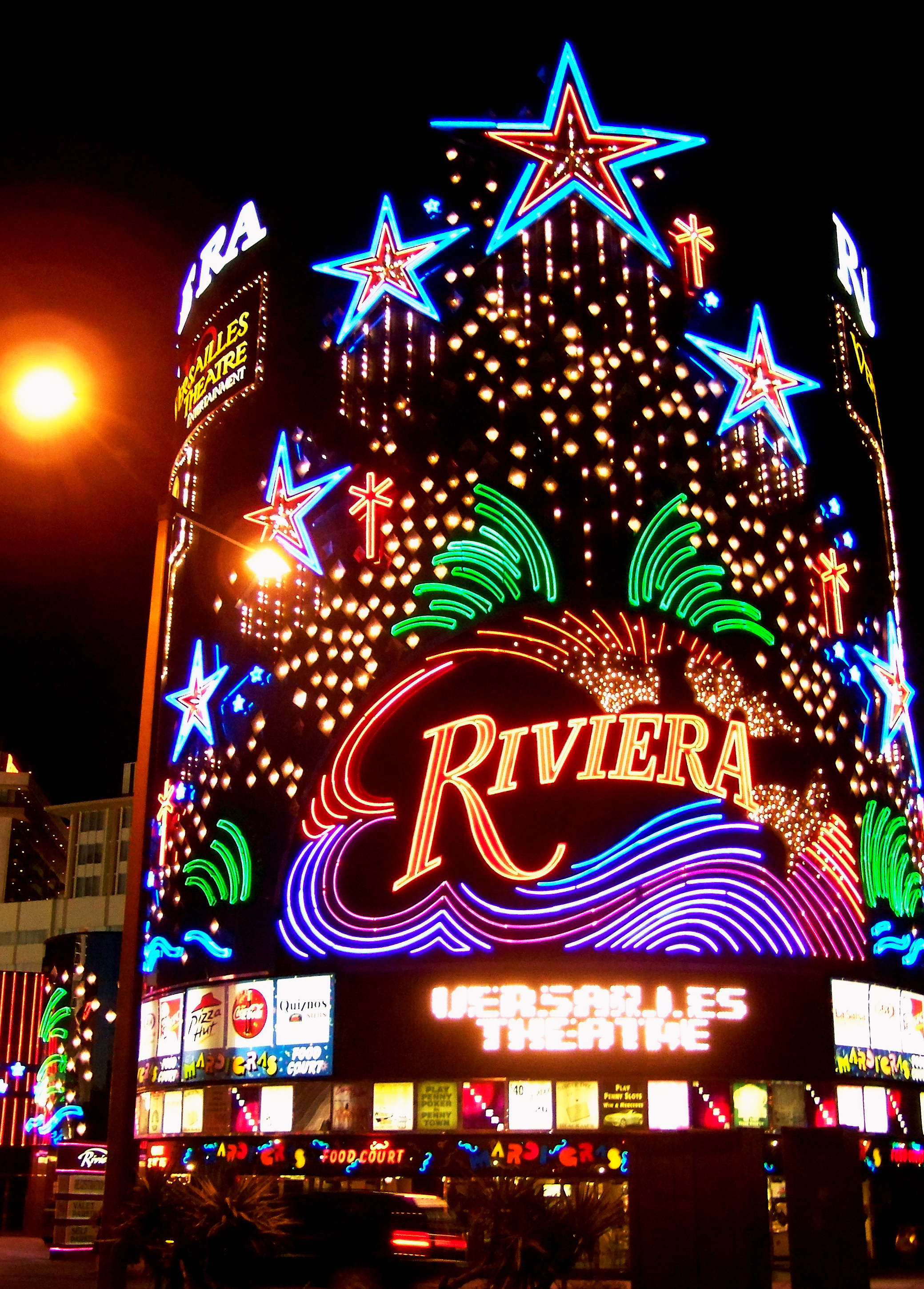
The Riviera casino and hotel in Las Vegas, Nevada

Silbert was an entertainment lawyer. He represented actors including Constance Bennett, Gail Russell, Dan Dailey, and Frank Sinatra, and studio and casino executives such as Howard Hughes.

With investors Bernard M. Silbert and M. A. Borenstein, Silbert acquired "50 retail stores and 12 parking lots" in Westwood, from S. Jon Kreedman in 1961. (The properties belonged to Arnold Kirkeby, but Kreedman had an option on them.)

Silbert served as the secretary and treasurer of the Albert Parvin Foundation, which owned stocks in the Parvin-Dohrmann Corporation, until it sold its gambling stocks due to allegations of corruption regarding Supreme Court Justice William O. Douglas in March 1968. Two months later, in May 1968, Silbert joined the board of directors of the corporation, which owned the Fremont Hotel and Casino and the Stardust Resort and Casino in Las Vegas, Nevada. Also in May 1968, he joined the board of directors of the Riviera, a hotel and casino on the Las Vegas Strip, alongside David Merrick and Harry A. Goodman. Silbert, who by December 1968 served as the vice president of the Parvin-Dohrmann Corporation, oversaw the acquisition of the Aladdin Resort & Casino from Milton Prell for US5.45 million in December 1968. Three years later, in 1971, he served as the president of the Riviera casino.

Silbert developed the Sheraton Plaza Hotel in Palm Springs, California, in 1984.

Silbert was a lawyer at Loeb & Loeb, an international law firm based in Century City, in the 1990s. From 1998 to 2002, Silbert belonged to Christensen, Miller, Fink, Jacobs, Glaser, Weil and Shapiro.

== Philanthropy ==
Silbert served on the board of directors of the Cedars-Sinai Medical Center, the Bet Tzedek Legal Services, and the Shaare Zedek Medical Center. He made charitable gifts to the Anti-Defamation League and the Milken Family Foundation.

Silbert served on the board of trustees of his alma mater, the Southwestern University School of Law, where he endowed the Harvey L. and Lillian Silbert Public Interest Fellowship Program with his wife. He also served on the board of trustees of the University of California, Los Angeles (UCLA). He also endowed the Silbert International Scholars Program at UCLA's School of Medicine.

Silbert served as the chairman of the American Friends of the Hebrew University of Jerusalem. With his wife, he endowed the Harvey L. Silbert Center for Israeli Studies and supported the construction of the Lillian and Harvey L. Silbert Humanities Building, the Silbert Family Wing in the Louis Boyar Building, and the Lillian Silbert Garden on its campus. Moreover, Silbert helped Bernard Cherrick, its vice president, bring Hollywood celebrities to attend fundraisers on campus. He persuaded Frank Sinatra to endow the construction of the Frank Sinatra International Student Centre on campus. He also persuaded Barbra Streisand to endow the Emanuel Streisand Building for Jewish Studies in 1984.

== Personal life, death and legacy ==
Silbert married Lillian Schwartz around 1935. They had a son, Kenneth, and a daughter, Lynne. They resided in a house designed by architect Harold Levitt in Beverly Hills, California.

Silbert died on September 28, 2002, in Los Angeles, California. His funeral was held at the Temple Israel of Hollywood.

The American Friends of the Hebrew University named the annual Harvey L. Silbert Torch of Learning Award in his honor. It was awarded to attorney William Shernoff in 2008. By 2015, it was awarded to Jonathan H. Anschell, the Executive Vice President, Deputy General Counsel and Secretary for the CBS Corporation, and Richard S. Volpert, a partner at the law firm Glaser Weil.
