= Shernoff =

Shernoff is a surname. Notable people with the surname include:

- Andy Shernoff (born 1955), American musician.
- Michael Shernoff (1951–2008), American psychologist.
- William Shernoff (born c. 1949), American lawyer.
