= Stella Hume =

Australian radio announcer (1882–1954)

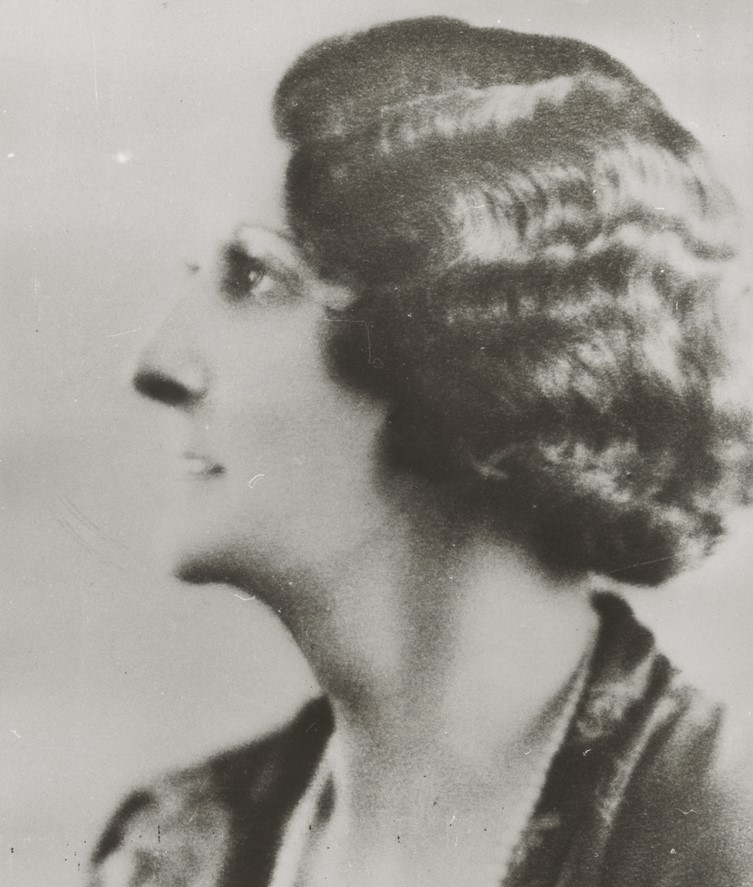
- Born: Stella Leonora Harriette Jeremy; 4 October 1882; South Yarra, Victoria, Australia
- Died: 3 January 1954; Goulburn, New South Wales, Australia
- Occupation(s): Radio announcer, theatre art director, elocution teacher
- Spouse: Ernest James Hume
- Children: 4

Stella Hume (4 October 1882 – 3 January 1954) was an Australian radio announcer who was an early figure in radio in South Australia.

== Biography ==
Stella Hume was born in Victoria. Not much is known of her life until she married Ernest James Hume (1869–1929), in Mosman, a suburb of Sydney in 1905 and moved with him to Adelaide, South Australia where Ernest Hume was developing a business with his brother Walter Reginald Hume, manufacturing steel and pipes, and eventually inventing patented products.

Hume worked in several cultural industries in Adelaide while raising her four children, including teaching elocution lessons. She was art director of the Adelaide Repertory Theatre, and accomplished music, singing, dancing, sculpture and flower arranging. She was an actress in silent films under the name Leonora Starr.

In 1923, the Hume family, led by Stella's sons Jack Hume and Ernest Hume, Jr., became interested in the new technology of radio transmission and saw in the potential for cultural, social and education opportunities afforded by the technology. As a result, they acquired equipment and established a radio studio in their home on Park Terrace (later Greenhill Road) at Parkside, receiving a permit to broadcast from their home studio. The station became 5 Don N and later 5DN. The station became increasingly popular and went from broadcasting for a few hours per day to continuous broadcasting. Including broadcasting from their home, the family broadcast from the Elder Conservatorium of Music and the University of Adelaide.

Hume was one of the world's first female announcers and programme directors;she used the name Miss Leonora Starr as announcer of an elocutionist programme and the name Auntie Stella, for children's programming. Broadcasts from 5DN were broadcast in almost every country in the world.

Stella Hume was active in volunteer work in Adelaide, including driving disabled children to and from the hospital, and with the Liberal Union.

Hume's husband, Ernest James Hume, died in 1929 and Stella Hume moved to Neutral Bay, Sydney. She continued to give occasional radio talks there and patented a four-valve wireless receiver. She became involved in Spiritualism. She moved back to Adelaide in 1939 and then to Goulburn, New South Wales in the early 1950s and died at Kenmore Mental Hospital in 1954.
