= The Spirit of Christmas: Christmas Carols Sung by The Mormon Tabernacle Choir =

Studio album by Mormon Tabernacle Choir
- Released: 1959
- Genre: Christian music, Christmas music
- Label: Columbia Masterworks

The Spirit of Christmas: Christmas Carols Sung by The Mormon Tabernacle Choir is an album by the Mormon Tabernacle Choir. It was released in 1959 on the Columbia Masterworks label (catalog nos. MS-6100).

The album debuted on Billboard magazine's popular albums chart on December 28, 1959, peaked at No. 5, and remained on that chart for two weeks.

== Track listing ==
Side 1

1. "Lo, How A Rose E'er Blooming" (arranged by Michael Praetorius) [2:32]
2. "Tell Us, Shepherd Maids" (arranged by Mary E. Caldwell) [2:16]
3. "O Little Town Of Bethlehem" (music by Lewis H. Redner, written Phillips Brooks) [1:44]
4. "The Snow Lay On The Ground" (arranged by Leo Sowerby) [3:38]
5. "The Shepherds' Story" (lyrics by William Morris, written by Clarence Dickinson) [4:32]
6. "For Christ Is Born" (arranged by R. Crawford, written by K. Aiken, Mary E. Crawford) [4:12]
7. "Hark! The Herald Angels Sing!" (adapted by W. H. Cummings, music by Felix Mendelssohn, words by Charles Wesley) [1:42]
8. "While Shepherds Watched Their Flocks" (arranged by Arthur Warrell) [2:12]
9. "The Coventry Carol" (arranged by Bryceson Treharne) [3:32]

Side 2

1. "Silent Night, Holy Night" (music by Franz Gruber, words by Josef Mohr) [3:15]
2. "Carol Of The Bells" (arranged by Peter J. Wilhousky, written by M. Leontovich) [1:30]
3. "Glory To God In The Highest" (written by Giovanni B. Pergolesi) [3:28]
4. "The Three Kings" (lyrics by Rev. Lluis Romeu, translated by Deems Taylor, written by Kurt Schindler) [2:30]
5. "Break Forth, O Beauteous Heavenly Light (Christmas Oratorio)" (written by Johan S. Bach) [1:50]
6. "Bethlehem Night" (lyrics by W. Leslie Nicholls, music by Arthur Warrell) [1:55]
7. "What Perfume Is This? O Shepherds, Say!" (arranged by Samuel Liddle) [2:12]
8. "Christmas Day" (written by Gustav Holst) [7:06]
9. "O Come, All Ye Faithful" (written by F. Oakley) [1:40]
