= Walter Hume (industrialist) =

Australian inventor, industrialist (1873–1943)

Walter Reginald Hume
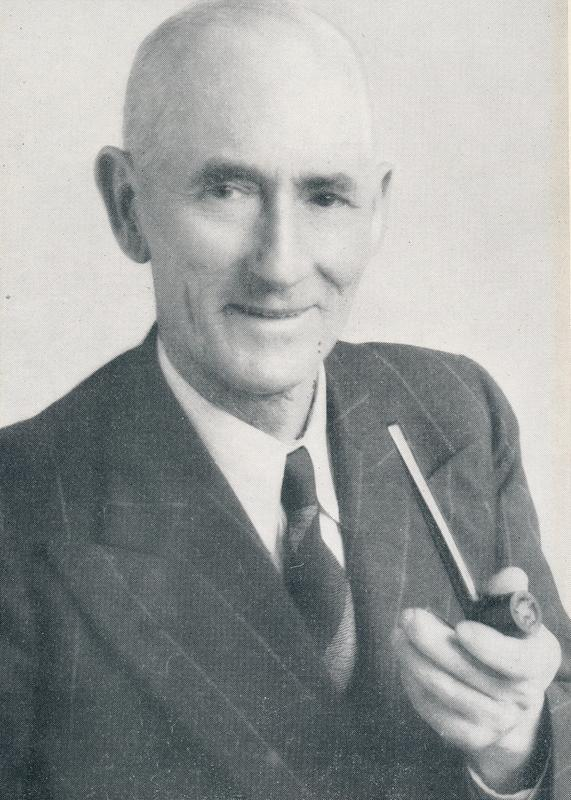
- Hume, c. 1925
- Born: 29 November 1873; Fitzroy, Victoria, Australia
- Died: 21 July 1943 (aged 69); Melbourne, Victoria, Australia
- Occupations: Inventor and manufacturer
- Spouse: Alice Louisa Bourne Mudford
- Children: 9
- Relatives: Ernest J Hume, Stella Hume,

Walter Reginald Hume (29 November 1873 – 21 July 1943) was an Australian inventor and industrialist known for inventing modern techniques of producing concrete and steel pipes.

== Early life ==
Hume travelled around Victoria in his early years with his father who gave lectures as a professional phrenologist. Walter Hume was 12 years old when his father died and in the altered family circumstances, Hume had to leave school to find work. He tried his hand at several trades, including plasterering.

== Invention and industry ==
During the depression of the 1890s, Hume and his elder brother, Ernest James Hume (ca.1869 – 18 January 1929), joined forces and worked in country Victoria in construction, repair and farming, from which they developed a workshop business at Malmsbury, Victoria making fencing droppers from hoop iron. The brothers received their first patent for this work.

The brothers moved to South Australia to establish a second factory, but soon after closed down the original Malmsbury business, diversifying towards ornamental steel fencing. In 1910, they established Humes' Patent Cement Iron Syndicate Ltd.as a means of commercialising and developing the centrifugal process for the manufacture of concrete pipes invented by Hume. This technology had a profound impact internationally in developing modern drainage and sewerage systems. On 7 November 1940, a significant contract was signed with the South Australian Government, for construction of the Morgan Whyalla pipeline, to the value of £505,627. Between 1921 and 1926 they ran 250 miles (400 km) of reinforced concrete pipe for the Loveday Irrigation Project. The locomotive used to transport all materials has been restored and operates as an attraction at the Cobdogla Irrigation Museum.

William Dargie painted two portraits of Hume.

== Gallery ==
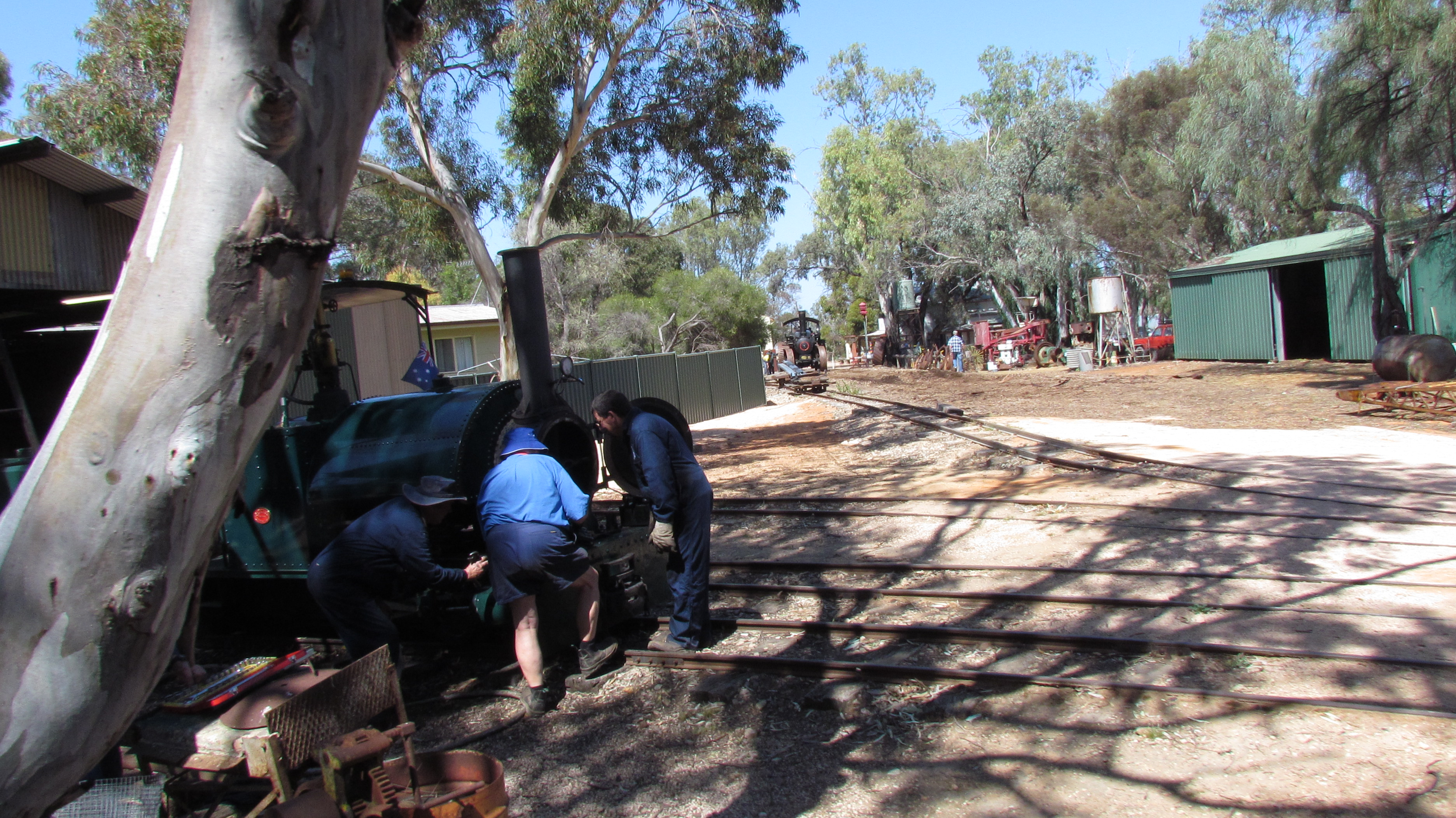
Humes steam loco at Cobdogla

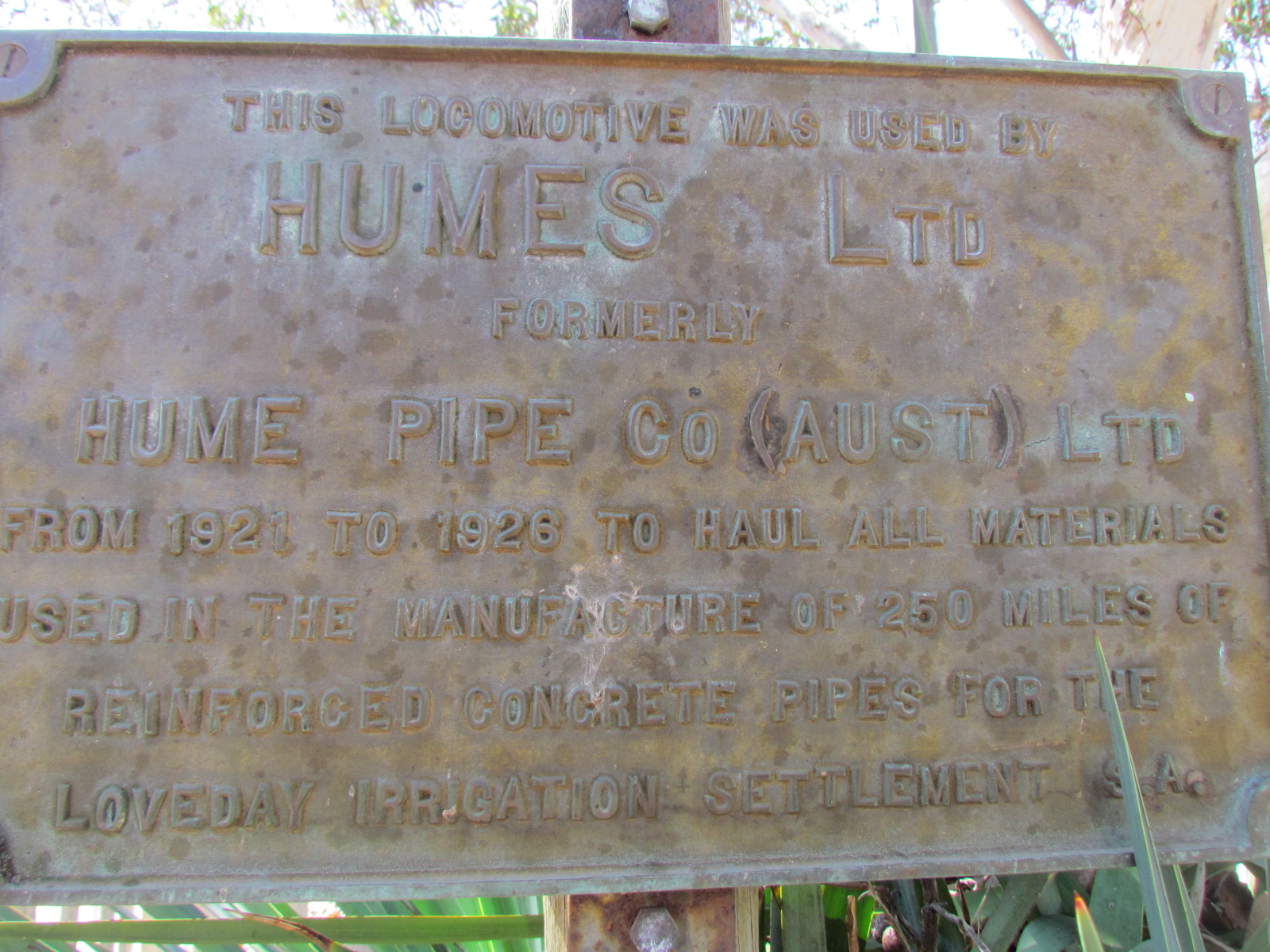
Plaque at Cobdogla

== Death ==
Hume died of cancer in Melbourne on 21 July 1943, leaving five sons and three daughters.
