= Haim Beinart =

Israeli historian and academic administrator

- חיים ביינרט
- Born: November 14, 1917; Pskow, Russia
- Died: February 16, 2010 (aged 92); Jerusalem, Israel
- Education: Hebrew University of Jerusalem
- Occupation: Historian
- Spouse: Ruth Beinart
- Children: 4

Haim Beinart (Hebrew: חיים ביינרט; 1917–2010) was an Israeli historian and academic administrator. Originally from Russia, he was a professor of history at the Hebrew University of Jerusalem. He served as the dean of humanities at the Ben-Gurion University of the Negev. He specialized in the history of Iberian Jews, especially in the History of the Jews in Spain.

== Biography ==
Haim Beinart was born on November 14, 1917, in Pskow, Russia. In 1923, when he was six years old, his family settled in Riga. Beinart's parents were Hasidic Jews, and he attended a Jewish school. He graduated in 1934, and served in the Latvian Army until 1937.

Beinart made aliyah to attend the Hebrew University of Jerusalem in 1937. While he was at university, he served as an intelligence officer in the Irgun. He also served in the 1948 War of Independence. He subsequently went on a trip to Spain, where he researched the history of Iberian Jews. He earned a PhD from the HUJ in 1955.

With his wife Ruth, Beinart had four children: Yael, Yosef, Shelomo, and Hagit. He died on February 16, 2010, in Jerusalem, Israel.

== Academic career ==
Beinart became a lecturer at his alma mater, the Hebrew University of Jerusalem, in 1958. He was promoted to senior lecturer in 1963, associate professor in 1966 and full professor in 1971. Meanwhile, he was appointed as the dean of humanities at the Ben-Gurion University of the Negev in 1969. He was also a visiting scholar at the Institute of Advanced Study from September 1986 to June 1987. He retired from the Hebrew University of Jerusalem in 1988 as the Bernard Cherrick Professor Emeritus of History of the Jewish People.

Beinart was an expert on Iberian Jews. He visited many towns in Spain to investigate their Jewish pasts.

Beinart became a corresponding member of the Spanish Academy of Humanities in 1973 and a member of the Israel Academy of Sciences and Humanities in 1981. He was the inaugural recipient of the "Three Cultures Prize" from the Córdoba, Andalusia for his scholarship in 1986. He received an honorary doctorate from the Complutense University of Madrid in 1988. He was the recipient of the Israel Prize in 1991.

== Published works ==
- Beinart, Haim, ed. (1974–1985). Records of the trials of the Spanish Inquisition in Ciudad Real. Jerusalem: Israel National Academy of Sciences and Humanities. ISBN 9789652080240. OCLC 1297217.
- Beinart, Haim (1980). Trujillo, a Jewish community in Extremadura on the Eve of the Expulsion from Spain. Jerusalem: Magnes Press. ISBN 9789652233493. OCLC 7248199.
- Beinart, Haim (1981). Conversos on Trial: The Inquisition in Ciudad Real. Jerusalem: Magnes Press. ISBN 9789652233844. OCLC 8766020.
- Beinart, Haim (1992). Atlas of Medieval Jewish History. Jerusalem: Carta. ISBN 9781441656179. OCLC 709715798.
- Beinart, Haim, ed. (1992). The Sephardi Legacy. Jerusalem: Magnes Press. ISBN 9789652237996. OCLC 28150442.
- Beinart, Haim (2002). The Expulsion of the Jews from Spain. Portland, Oregon: Littman Library of Jewish Civilization. ISBN 9781874774419. OCLC 470225028.
