= Adam Tuominen =

Australian actor (born 1980)

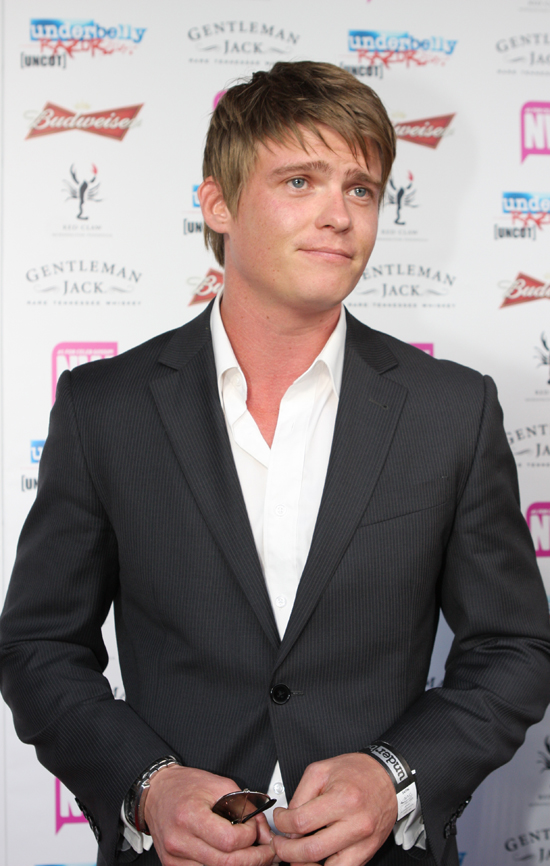
- Tuominen in November 2011.
- Born: 22 January 1980 (age 46); Adelaide, South Australia, Australia
- Education: National Institute of Dramatic Art
- Occupation: Actor
- Years active: 2002–present
- Spouse: Stephanie Horlin-Smith (m. 2018)

Adam Tuominen (born 22 January 1980) is an Australian actor best known for his role as Hunter Bradley, the Crimson Thunder Ranger in Power Rangers Ninja Storm.

== Early life ==
Tuominen was born in Adelaide, South Australia, one of three children to Christine and Lauri Tuominen. He and his twin brother Sam have an older sister, Natalie. He is of Finnish and Lithuanian descent; his father was born in Finland. Tuominen attended St Peter's College, Adelaide where he studied drama. Afterwards he went on to study drama and directing at Flinders University's Drama Centre. At Age 21, he graduated from the prestigious school National Institute of Dramatic Art in Sydney. He also studied martial arts for five years.

== Personal life ==
Tuominen married Stephanie Horlin-Smith in 2018 in Adelaide, South Australia.

== Acting career ==
In 2003, he joined the main cast of the American series Power Rangers Ninja Storm where he played Hunter Bradley until the end of the series. He reprised his role as Hunter in a guest appearance for two episodes of Power Rangers Dino Thunder in 2004. In 2006, he appeared as a guest in an episode of the series McLeod's Daughters where he played John Nostier, and in 2008, he appeared on stage in Melborn08's Playspotting at the La Mama Courthouse Theatre, where he played three different roles - A Cup of Sugar, The Trick and Lovely Bits. In 2011, he appeared in the mini-series Underbelly: Razor where he played the criminal and explosives expert Frank "Razor Jack" Hayes.

== Filmography ==
=== Television ===
Year	Title	Role	Notes
2002	Always Greener	Aaron/Drew Savage	Episode: "Mirror Image"
2002	Young Lions	Nathan Smyth	Episode: "Boy School Bullies"
2003	Power Rangers Ninja Storm	Hunter Bradley	35 episodes
2004	Power Rangers Dino Thunder	Hunter Bradley	2 episodes: "Thunder Storm" Pt. 1 & 2
2006	Mcleod's Daughters	John Nostier	Episode: "Lost & Found"
2011	Underbelly: Razor	Frank "Razor Jack" Hayes	13 episodes, mini-series
2017	Pine Gap		Netflix mini-series
2022	Gymnastics Academy: A Second Chance	Shane Fuller-Jones	4 episodes, mini-series

=== Films ===
Year	Title	Character	Notes
2003	Temptation	Messenger	with Toby Schmitz and Emma Lung
2004	For Love or Money	Productor	Short film
2010	My Friend Pillow	James	Short film with Nina Pearce
2010	I Rot	Deacon	Short film with Nick Buckland
2011	A Second Chance	Shane Fuller	with Nina Pearce and Emily Morris
2015	The Ghoul	Shot Gun Thug	Short - with Matt Boesenberg, Jeremy Lindsay Taylor and Guy Spence
2016	Raising the Bar	Pete Johnson	Feature Film
2018	A Second Chance - Rivals	Shane Fuller-Jones	Feature Film
2020	Escape from Pretoria	Jeremy Cronin	Feature Film

=== Theatre ===
Year	Title	Character	Notes
2000	Undiscovered Country	Paul	NIDA
2000	A Midsummer Night's Dream	Demetrius	NIDA
2001	Languages of the Gods	Theo	NIDA
2001	The Sea	Wad Thompson	NIDA
2001	Ring Round the Moon	Joshua	NIDA
2001	Kiss Me Kate	Gremio	NIDA
2003	Loot	Dennis	
2005	The School for Scandal	Charles Surface	Adelaide Repertory Theatre
2006	I Hate Hamlet	Andrew Rally	Adelaide Repertory Theatre
2007	Kiss Me Kate	Gunman #1	East Coast Tour
2007	Two Gentlemen of Verona	Proteus	Mixed Salad Productions
2008	As You Like It	Orlando de Boys	This Rough Magic Theateatre, Adelaide Fringe
2008	A Streetcar Named Desire	Stanley Kowlaski	Adelaide University Theatre Guild
2009	Play Spotting	Various	Melbourne Fringe Festival
2009	The Glass Menagerie	Gentleman Caller	Adelaide Repertory Theatre
2009	Frankie and Johnny in the Clair de Lune	Johnny	Mixed Salad Productions
2010	Mr. Johnson	Harry Rudbeck	Adelaide Independent Theatre
2010	The Woman in Black	Actor	Adelaide Repertory Theatre
2010	Sherlock Holmes and the Hound of the Baskervilles	Jack Stapleton	
2013	Corpse	Evelyn & Rupert Farrant	Therry Dramatic Society
2014	Misalliance		Adelaide Repertory Theatre
2015	The Beaux' Stratagem	Jack Archer	
2015	Much Ado About Nothing	Benedick	
2015	Einstein and the Polar Bear	Bill	
2016	The Umbrella Plays		Fringe Festival
2016	Death of a Salesman	Biff Loman	
2016	Extremities	Raul	
2017	Our Boys	Joe	

=== Video games ===
Year	Title	Character	Notes
2003	Power Rangers Ninja Storm (video game)	Hunter Bradley	Voice

== Awards and nominations ==
Year	Award	Category	Work	Result	Ref.
2008	Curtain Call Award	Best Male Performance	A Streetcar Named Desire	Nominated	
2009	Adelaide's Critic Choice	Best Male Performance	The Glass Menagerie	Nominated	
2010	Curtain Call Award	Best Male Performance	Frankie and Johnny	Won	
