= Cyclone Val =

South Pacific cyclone in 1991

Severe Tropical Cyclone Val
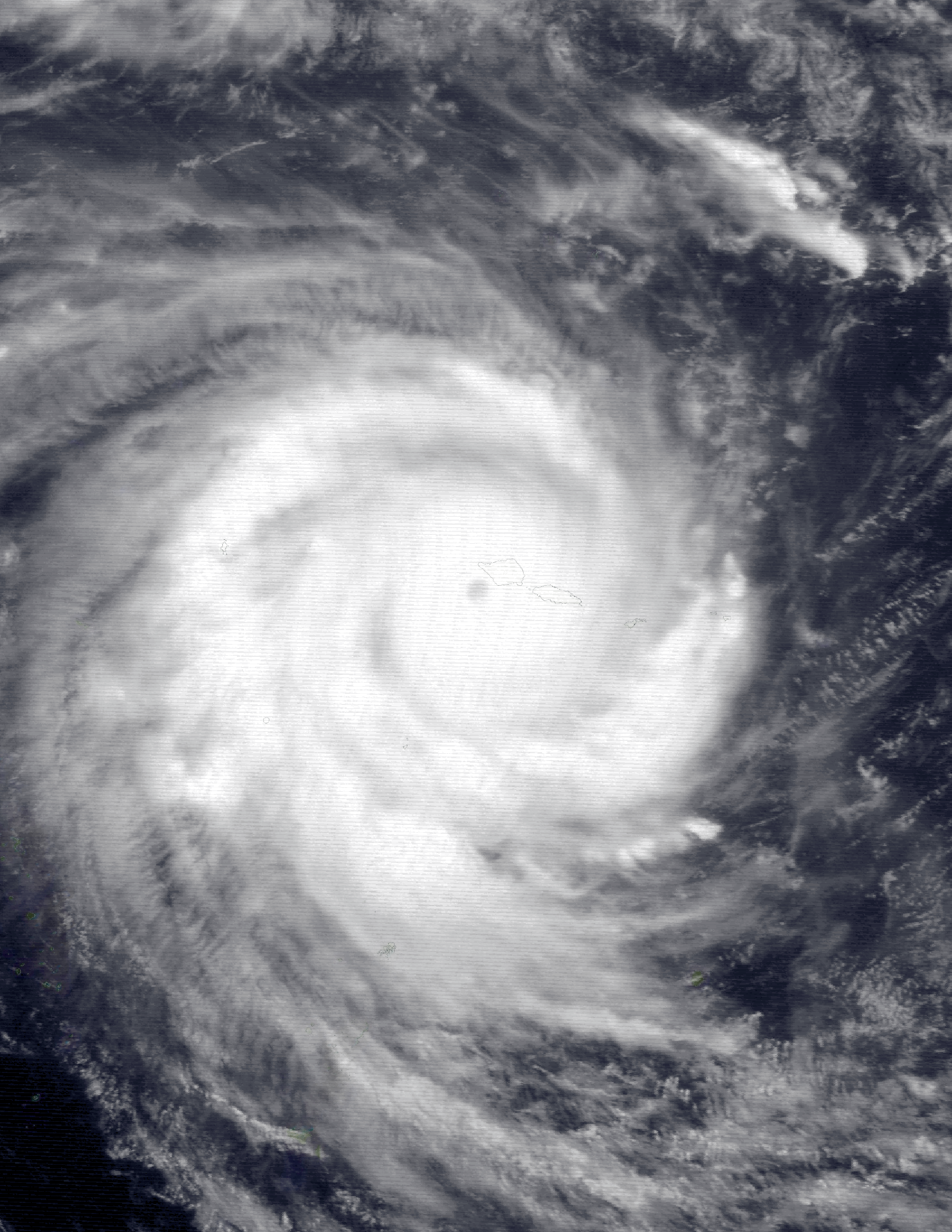
- Val at peak intensity off Samoa on December 8

Meteorological history
- Formed: December 4, 1991
- Extratropical: December 13, 1991
- Dissipated: December 17, 1991

Category 4 severe tropical cyclone
- 10-minute sustained (FMS)
- Highest winds: 165 km/h (105 mph)
- Lowest pressure: 940 hPa (mbar); 27.76 inHg

Category 4-equivalent tropical cyclone
- 1-minute sustained (SSHWS/NPMOC)
- Highest winds: 230 km/h (145 mph)
- Lowest pressure: 916 hPa (mbar); 27.05 inHg

Overall effects
- Fatalities: 17 confirmed
- Damage: $381 million (1991 USD)
- Areas affected: Tuvalu, Tokelau, Wallis and Futuna, Samoan Islands, Cook Islands, Tonga
- IBTrACS
- Part of the 1991–92 South Pacific cyclone season

Severe Tropical Cyclone Val (also known as Hurricane Val) was considered to be the worst tropical cyclone to affect the Samoan Islands since the 1889 Apia cyclone. The system was first identified during the opening days of December 1991, as a small circulation, within the Intertropical Convergence Zone to the north of Tokelau. Over the next few days, the system moved westwards towards Rotuma and Tuvalu and gradually developed further, before it was named Val on December 5, after it had become a category 1 tropical cyclone on the Australian tropical cyclone intensity scale. The system subsequently continued to intensify as it moved towards the Samoan Islands and peaked as a category 4 severe tropical cyclone, as it made landfall on the island of Savaii on December 6. After Val had passed over the island, weakening upper-level winds caused the system to slow down before it made a sharp clockwise loop which almost brought it over Savaii for a second time.

On December 9, Val completed its loop and started to move eastwards and gradually weakened before it passed over American Samoa early the next day. After passing over American Samoa, Val appeared to threaten the Southern Cook Islands and was expected to pass close to Palmerston Island. However, as the system continued to weaken, it started to move more towards the south-southeast than had been expected, which spared the Cook Islands. During December 13, Val became a strong extratropical depression, before the system was captured and sheared apart by strong environmental westerlies associated with the Antarctic Circumpolar Current as it approached 50°S during December 16.

The cyclone lasted for five days in American Samoa and was designated by the United States Government as a major disaster on December 13, 1991. Western Samoa suffered more damage than American Samoa. The cyclone devastated the islands with 150-mile-per-hour (240 km/h) winds and 50-foot (15 m) waves. The overall damages caused by Cyclone Val in American Samoa have been variously assessed. One estimate put the damages at $50 million in American Samoa and $200 million in Western Samoa due to damage to electrical, water, and telephone connections and destruction of various government buildings, schools, and houses.

== Meteorological history ==
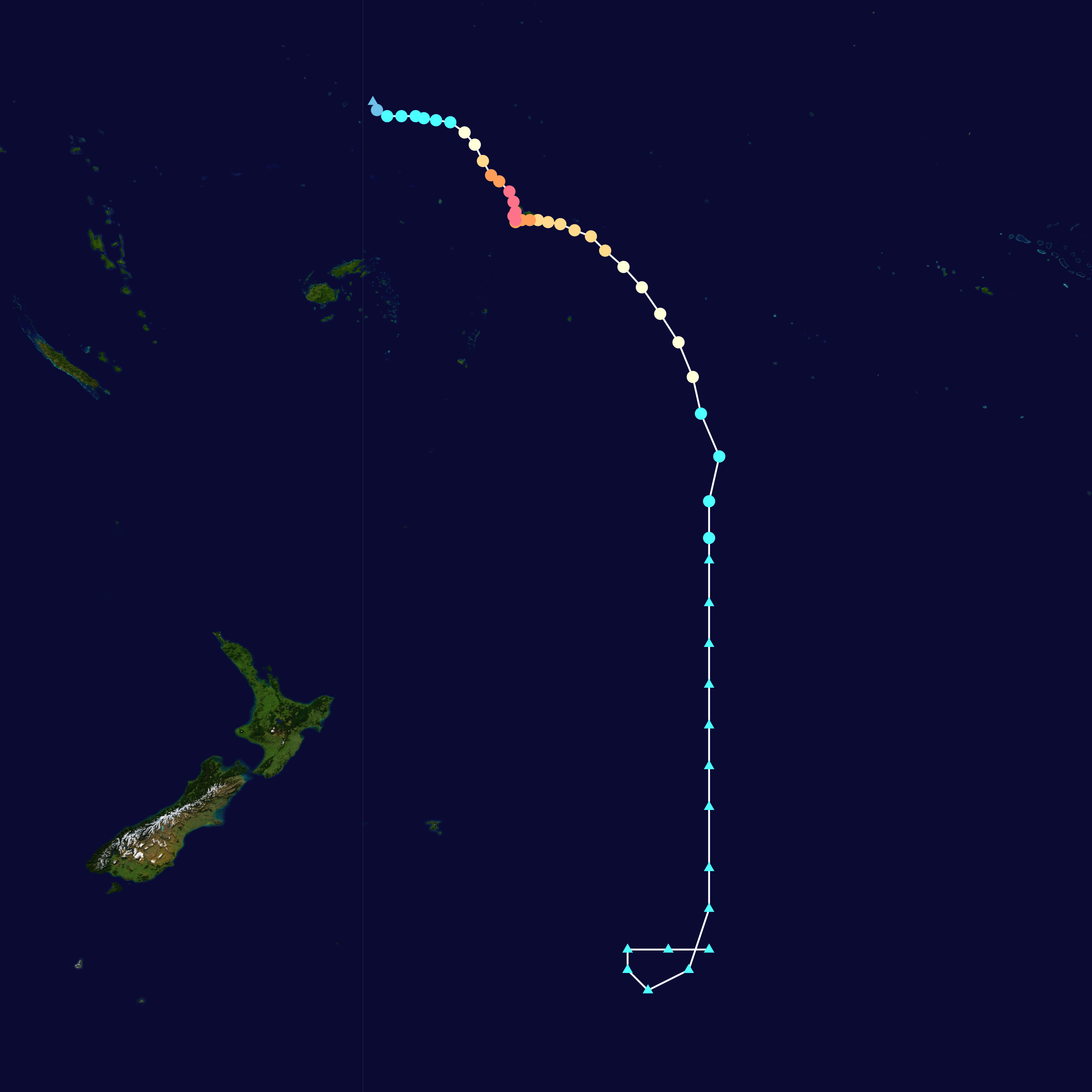
Map plotting the storm's track and intensity, according to the Saffir–Simpson scale Map key Saffir–Simpson scale Tropical depression (≤38 mph, ≤62 km/h) Tropical storm (39–73 mph, 63–118 km/h) Category 1 (74–95 mph, 119–153 km/h) Category 2 (96–110 mph, 154–177 km/h) Category 3 (111–129 mph, 178–208 km/h) Category 4 (130–156 mph, 209–251 km/h) Category 5 (≥157 mph, ≥252 km/h) Unknown Storm type Tropical cyclone Subtropical cyclone Extratropical cyclone, remnant low, tropical disturbance, or monsoon depression

During the opening days of December 1991, the Fiji Meteorological Service (FMS) started to monitor a small circulation, that had developed along the Intertropical Convergence Zone, just to the north of Tokelau as a result of a surge within the westerlies. Over the next few days, the system moved westwards towards Rotuma and Tuvalu, where it lay near the centre of an area of upper level outflow. During December 4, the FMS classified the system as a tropical depression by the FMS, while it was located just to the southeast of Tuvalu and moving north-westwards. The system was then named Val by the FMS during the next day, after it had become a category 1 tropical cyclone on the Australian tropical cyclone intensity scale. During that day the United States Naval Western Oceanography Center (NWOC) designated the system as Tropical Cyclone 06P and started to issue advisories, while Val started to move towards the south-southeast, after the upper level north-westerly steering winds increased. During December 6, the NWOC reported that the system had become equivalent to a category 2 hurricane on the Saffir-Simpson hurricane scale as Val continued to steadily intensify and moved south-eastwards, away from Tuvalu and towards the Samoan Islands. Early on December 7, the FMS reported that the system had become a category 3 severe tropical cyclone, as it started to be steered southwards by upper-level northerlies.

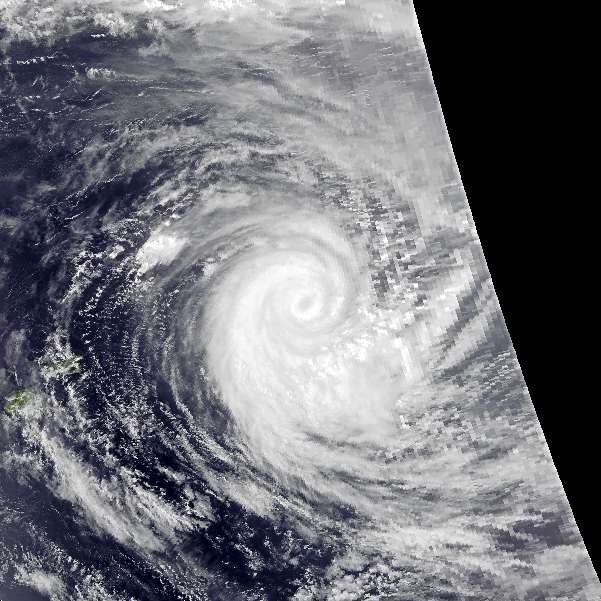
Cyclone Val passing over Tutuila on December 9

Later that day, the FMS reported that Val had reached its peak 10-minute sustained wind speeds of about 165 km/h (105 mph), which made it a category 4 severe tropical cyclone on the Australian scale. The system subsequently made landfall on the Samoan island of Savaii at around 1800 UTC (07:00 SST), while the NWOC reported that the cyclone had peaked with 1-minute sustained wind speeds of about 230 km/h (145 mph), which made it equivalent to a category 4 hurricane on the SSHWS. (Note: This article defines Samoa Standard Time as being 11 hours behind Coordinated Universal Time (UTC) per the local time used in Western Samoa between 1892 and December 29, 2009.) After Val had passed over the island, weakening upper-level winds caused the system to slow down before it made a sharp clockwise loop which almost brought it over Savaii for a second time. During December 9, Val completed its loop and started to move eastwards and gradually weaken, before it passed over the American Samoan island of Tutuila early the next day. After passing over American Samoa, Val appeared to threaten the Southern Cook Islands and was expected to pass close to Palmerston Island. However, as the system continued to weaken, it started to move more towards the south-southeast then had been expected, which spared the Cook Islands. During December 12, the FMS reported that Val had weakened into a category two tropical cyclone and passed the primary warning responsibility for the system to the New Zealand Meteorological Service (NZMS) after Val had moved out of its area of responsibility. Shortly after moving into the NZMS's area of responsibility, Val transitioned into a strong extratropical depression. Storm force winds subsequently persisted around the centre of Val's extratropical remnants for the next 3 days, before the system was captured and sheared apart by strong environmental westerlies associated with the Antarctic Circumpolar Current as it approached 50°S.

== Effects ==
Area	Deaths	Damages (USD)	Ref
American Samoa	1	$100 million	
Cook Islands	None	$543,500	
Flying Cloud	3	N/A	
Samoa	13	$280 million	
Tokelau	None	$750,000	
Tonga	None	Minor	
Tuvalu	None	Minor	
Wallis and Futuna	None	Minor	
Total	17	$381 million	

Severe Tropical Cyclone Val caused over US$300 million in damage and caused 17 deaths, as it impacted the Cook Islands, American Samoa, Samoa, Tokelau, Tonga, Tuvalu as well as Wallis and Futuna. Some of these island nations were still recovering from the effects of Severe Tropical Cyclone Ofa, which had impacted Polynesia less than two years earlier. Val's main impacts were to the Samoan Islands, where it was responsible for 14 deaths and was considered to be the worst tropical cyclone to impact the islands since the 1889 Apia cyclone. As a result of the impact of this storm, the name Val was retired from the tropical cyclone naming lists.

=== Western Samoa ===
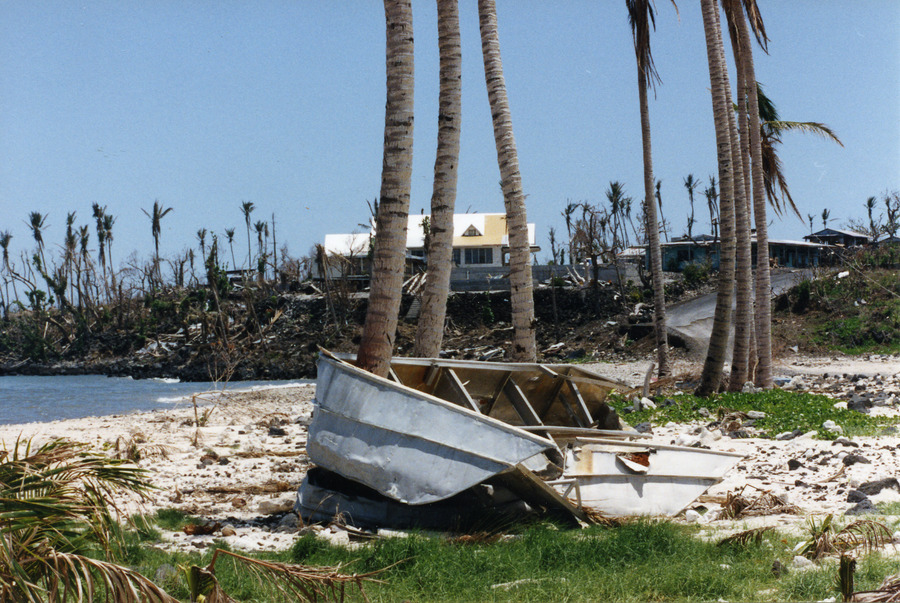
Damage to a beach and a boat caused by Tropical Cyclone Val

On December 6, the FMS issued a gale warning for Western Samoa, as it had become apparent that Val would impact the island nation, before issuing storm and hurricane warnings for the island as the system moved closer to the archipelago. During that day, northeasterly winds and high seas caused damage to coastal areas on both Savaii and Upolu, before the weather stations at Apia and Faleolo started to report that gale-force winds were occurring during December 7. In a radio broadcast ahead of Val making landfall, the then Samoan Prime Minister: Tofilau Eti Alesana prayed for the country to be spared the worst of Val, but also urged Samoan's to accept the storm as God's will. The system made landfall on the island of Savaii at about 18:00 UTC (07:00 SST) on December 7, where hurricane-force winds of up to 165 km/h (105 mph) and wind-gusts of up to 240 km/h (150 mph) were thought to have occurred. After the system had made landfall, Val started to move south-westwards and away from the Western Samoa, which prompted the FMS to forecast that winds over the islands would decrease over the islands during December 9. This had the impact of causing Samoan's to drop their guard, start clearing up, repairing houses and going about their day-to-day business, however, during that day the system completed a cyclonic loop just to the southwest of Savaii, which almost brought Val over the island for a second time. After completing the cyclonic loop, Val moved eastwards and passed about 20 km (10 mi) to the south of Upolu during December 9, before it started to move south-eastwards away from the Samoan Islands during December 10, after it had made landfall on Tutuila in American Samoa.

=== American Samoa ===
On December 6, the FMS placed American Samoa under a gale warning as it had become apparent that the system would impact the American territory, before the warning was upgraded to a hurricane warning the following day as Val moved closer to the archipelago. On December 8, the FMS downgraded the warning to a gale warning as the threat of Val passing near the territory decreased since the system had started to move southwards and now directly threatened the Samoan island of Savaii. After Val had passed over Savaii and performed a clockwise loop, the FMS realised that the system would move eastwards and pass over American Samoa, which caused them to reissue the hurricane warning.

=== Other island nations ===
As Val's precursor tropical depression developed, strong winds associated with the intertropical convergence zone, caused some minor damage to the Tuvaluan atoll of Funafuti and various other atolls in the island nation. During December 4, a strong wind warning was issued for the island nation of Tokelau, after the system had developed into a tropical depression. A tropical cyclone alert was subsequently issued during the next day, as it was thought that the cyclone could pose a threat to the island nation as it moved eastwards. During December 6, the FMS issued a gale warning for the whole of Tokelau, before gale-force winds of up to 75 km/h (45 mph) were observed at Atafu, as Val passed about 370 km (230 mi) to the south-west of the island nation. Squally conditions subsequently persisted over the islands for the next few days, with Fakaofo recording gale-force winds during December 10, in association with a convective rainband. Within the island nation, residents took refuge in a school building, while strong winds and high seas caused damage to homes and several uncompleted seawall structures, that were being installed following Ofa's impacts on the islands. The United Nations Development Programme subsequently funded a project between 1992 and 1995, which provided a limited reconstruction of the areas damaged by the cyclone. Total damages within the island nation were estimated at US$750,000.

During December 6, as the system moved southeastwards towards Samoa, the threat of gale-force or stronger winds developing over northern Tonga and the island of Wallis, within the French Overseas Territory of Wallis and Futuna increased. As a result, the FMS issued gale warnings for the islands of Niuafoʻou, Niuatoputapu and Wallis, while issuing a tropical cyclone alert for the rest of the Tongan islands. However, the warnings were cancelled during the next day, as the threat of gale-force or stronger winds developing over Wallis or northern Tonga had decreased. During December 8, after the system had made landfall on Savaii, Val started to move south-westwards and posed another threat to northern Tonga. As a result, a gale warning was reissued for Niuatoputapu, while the rest of Tonga was placed under a strong wind warning. A storm warning was subsequently issued for Niuatoputapu during December 9, after Val had produced gale-force winds over the island and moved closer to it. Storm-force winds of around 95 km/h (60 mph) were subsequently experienced on the island, while winds of below gale-force were experienced on Niuafoʻou. Wallis Island also did not experience any gale-force winds, however, some minor damage was reported on the island, after some minor flooding of coastal areas occurred.

During December 10, the FMS issued a gale warning for Palmerston Island and a tropical cyclone alert for the rest of the Southern Cook Islands, as Val accelerated south-eastwards and appeared to threaten the islands. However, the system subsequently moved more towards the south-southeast than had been expected and eventually passed around 370 km (230 mi) to the west of Palmerston Island. As a result, the Southern Cook Islands were spared any major damage from the system. However, gale- and storm-force winds were reported on the island during December 11, which were subsequently attributed to a convective rainband and rain squalls that appeared on satellite imagery at the time. Gale-force winds were also reported over Pukapuka and nearby islands in the Northern Cook Islands during December 11. Within the Cook Islands, damages to crops and infrastructure were reported, with total damages estimated at $1 million NZD (US$544 thousand). The government of the Cook Islands also asked for money to repair a seawall.

== Aftermath ==
=== American Samoa ===
The President of United States declared the event as a "major disaster", for which federal assistance was provided. The severity of Cyclone Val was aptly described by a local resident who stated: "But this Cyclone was stronger than me. For the first time I felt defeated I had never felt that before. I felt it was personal between me and Cyclone. I got depressed afterward." Aid was provided to the affected zones based on a categorization as Category A, B, C, D, E and F. The categories are defined by the degree of damage suffered. Assistance covered individuals, households, and the State and local governments. The assistance encouraged private, nonprofit organizations (NGOs) to meet and discuss expense-related emergency work and the repair or replacement of disaster-damaged infrastructure. Assistance provided "Hazard Mitigation Grants" to secure life and property from hazards. New Zealand and Australia provided considerable assistance to the affected population and helped with the reconstruction and recovery of infrastructure facilities. Samoans in the United States, Australia, and New Zealand helped finance the recovery by way of remittances to their relatives who suffered on the island.

==== Insurance lawsuit ====
In 1991, American Samoa purchased a $45 million "all risk" insurance policy from the firm Affiliated FM Insurance. The firm would only pay up to $6.1 million for the damages, arguing that the insurance did not cover water damage, only that caused by the wind. Attorney William Shernoff investigated and discovered that the insurance company had altered American Samoa's insurance policy to exclude damages caused by "wind-driven water", despite the fact that it still covered cyclones. The case was taken to court, and in 1995, the jury awarded the American Samoa Government $28.9 million. Soon after, the amount was doubled to $57.8 million to include punitive damages. The total damages awarded by the judgment was $86.7 million, which the judge stated to be "the largest insurance bad faith verdict in the state of California in 1995".

The revenues of American Samoa for the fiscal years 2002 and 2003, which had been showing a downward trend, registered a substantial increase attributed to the insurance settlement of claims made to cover the damages caused by Cyclone Val. This resulted in fiscal surpluses. The deficit of US$23.1 million at the start of 2001 changed to a surplus of US$43.2 million by end of 2003.

=== Samoa ===
As the system impacted the Samoan Islands, the New Zealand Government set up an emergency task force, to coordinate their response to the cyclone. The task force planned to deploy a Royal New Zealand Air Force Orion to conduct an aerial reconnaissance flight during December 8, however, this was postponed until December 10, due to the weather conditions over the Samoan Islands. They also planned to send a frigate to Samoa with relief supplies on board during December 10, as it was thought that the airport might have to be closed for a little while.

== See also ==
- 1889 Apia cyclone
- Cyclone Evan
- Cyclone Heta
