= S. Jon Kreedman =

American businessman

- Born: 1921; Detroit, Michigan, U.S.
- Died: November 5, 1999 (aged 77–78); Los Angeles, California, U.S.
- Occupations: Real estate developer, banker, philanthropist
- Political party: Democratic Party
- Spouse: Thelma Kreedman (divorced); Marlene Kreedman
- Children: 1 son, 1 daughter

S. Jon Kreedman (1921 – November 5, 1999) was an American real estate developer, banker and philanthropist. He built many houses and buildings in Los Angeles, California.

== Early life ==
S. Jon Kreedman was born c. 1921 in Detroit, Michigan. His father was a carpenter-turned-real estate developer. He moved to Los Angeles, California, in 1941, and he served in the United States Army during World War II.

== Career ==
=== Construction industry ===
Kreedman began his career by working for his father at the age of 15, first as a carpenter and later as a builder. He later worked for a construction firm. In 1948, he founded his own real estate development company, S. Jon Kreedman & Co., a real estate development company headquartered in Beverly Hills, California.

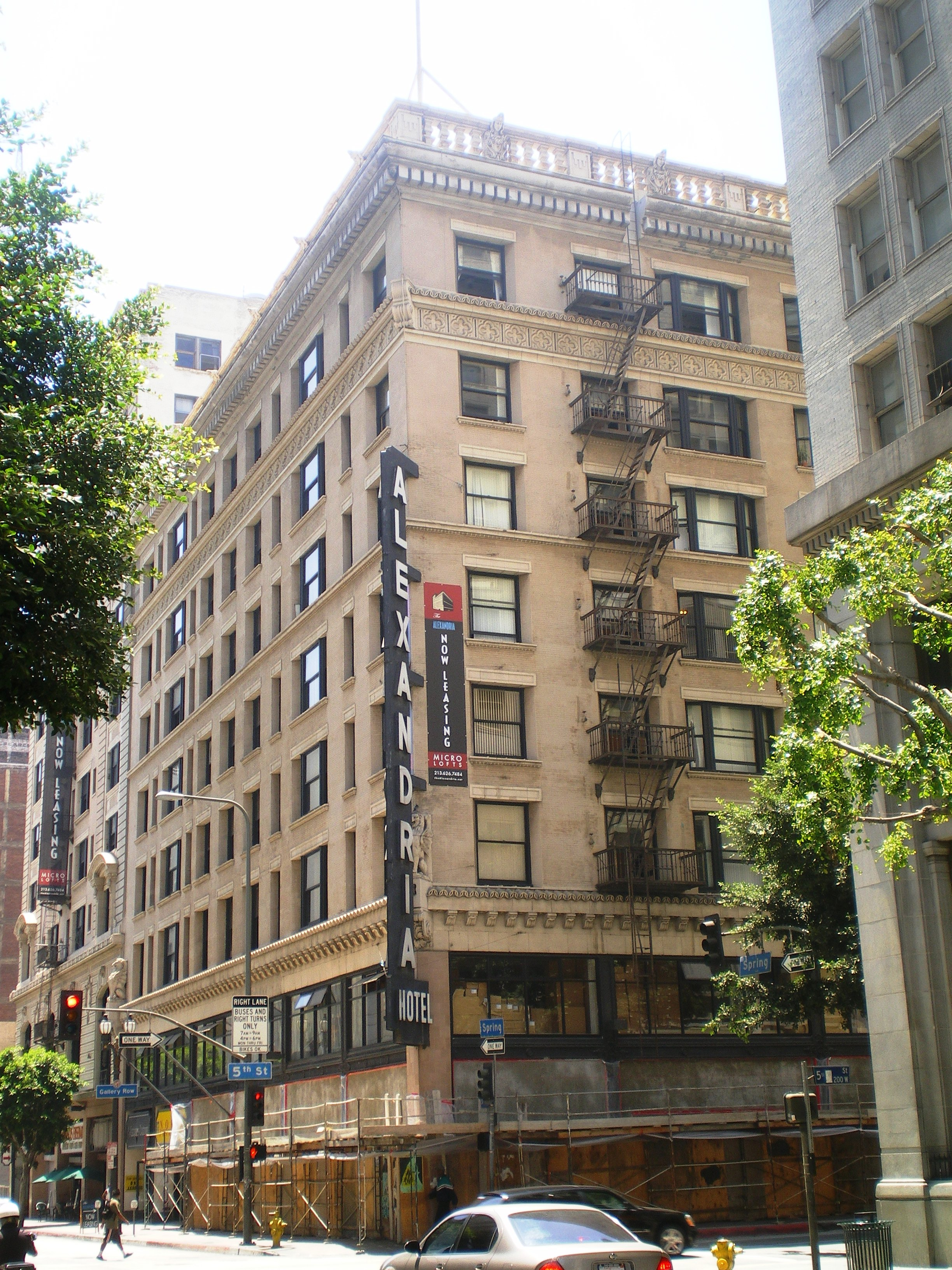
The Hotel Alexandria in Downtown Los Angeles, owned by Kreedman from 1961 to 1970.

Kreedman began by building tract homes in Los Angeles, California. He subsequently moved on to commercial buildings. He built the Brierwood Terrace-Valley Convalescent Hospital in Encino, California in 1958; its construction cost more than US$50,000. In 1959, he purchased the Plush Horse Restaurant at 1700 South Pacific Coast Highway in Redondo Beach, California, from Harold Gelber with two Chicago investors to build a new resort; it became known as the Plush Horse Inn in 1961. Meanwhile, he acquired the Hotel Alexandria in Downtown Los Angeles in 1961, only to restore it in 1970. Kreedman built the United California Bank Building on the corner of Wilshire Boulevard and Camden Drive in Beverly Hills, but its foundation wall collapsed because of the underground parking lot in 1961. By 1962, he controlled US$50 million of real estate. He built the One Wilshire in Downtown Los Angeles in 1966. In 1973, he converted The Century Towers in Century City from luxury rentals to condominiums.

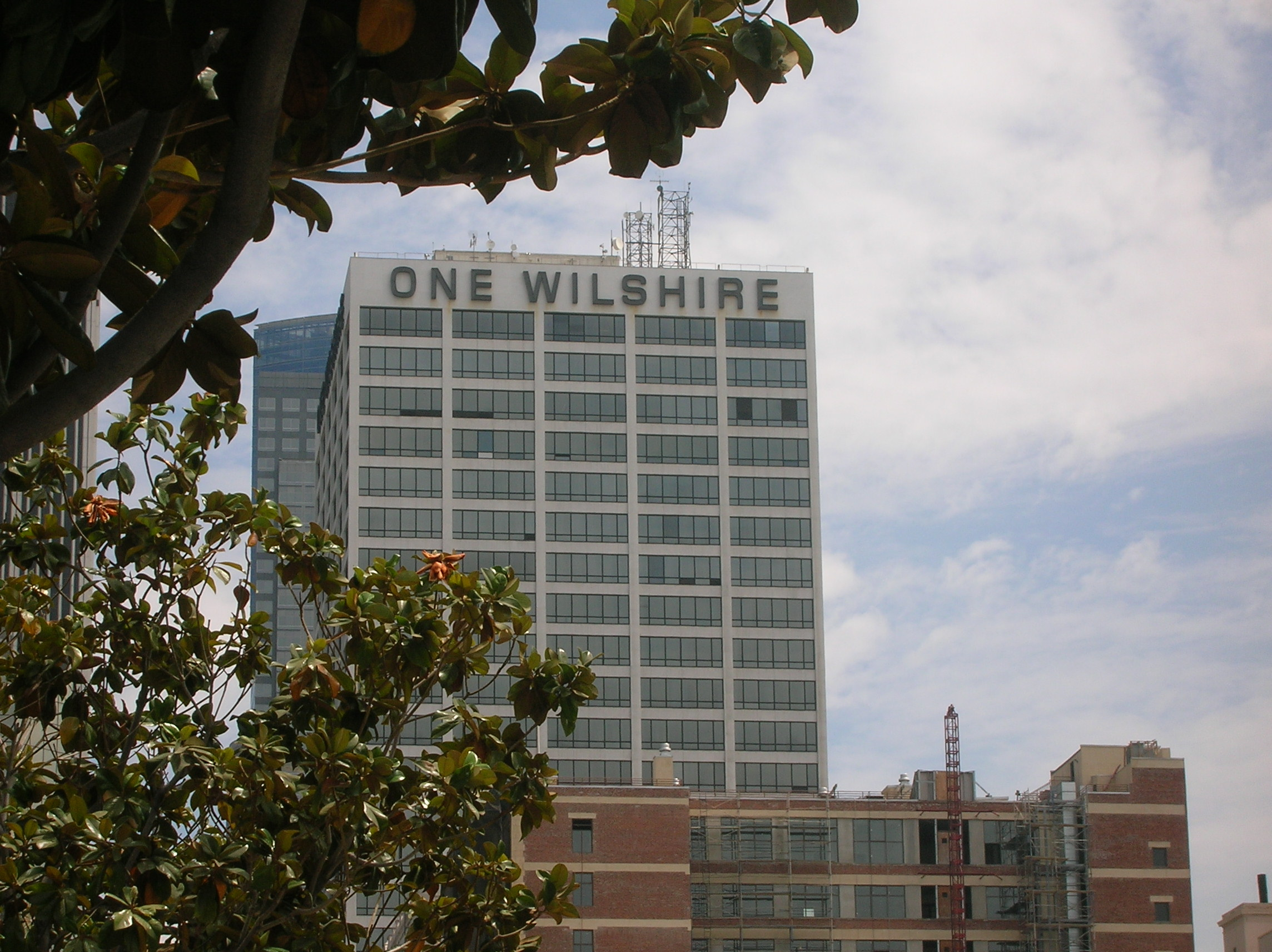
One Wilshire, developed by Kreedman.

Kreedman had an option on "50 retail stores and 12 parking lots" in Westwood owned by Arnold Kirkeby, which he sold to investors M. A. Borenstein, Bernard M. Silbert and Harvey Silbert in 1961.

Kreedman was appointed to the Advisory Commission on Housing Problems by Governor Pat Brown in 1961.

The company was sued in S. Jon Kreedman & Co. v Meyers Bros. Parking-Western Corp. in 1976 over the construction of a parking lot. The case showed that regardless of the lack of architectural plans, construction firms must repay the tenants for their lost profits.

Kreedman was invited to give lectures about the construction industry on the campuses of UCLA in 1960, and the Harvard Business School in 1967.

=== Finance ===
Kreedman founded American City Bank in 1963. He served as its chairman. It became "the largest independent bank in the Los Angeles area", with seven branches in Southern California by 1983. However, it went bankrupt that year, and it was acquired by the United Overseas Bank.

Kreedman was appointed to the board of directors of CalPERS in 1979. Three years later, in 1982, he was appointed to the board of administration of the Public Employees Retirement System for the City of Los Angeles.

== Philanthropy ==
Kreedman made charitable donations to the Cedars-Sinai Medical Center, the City of Hope National Medical Center, and the Variety Club of Southern California.

Kreedman supported the Hebrew University of Jerusalem and the Israel Bonds Organization.

== Political activity ==
Kreedman was a member of the Democratic Party. He campaigned for the 1969 re-election of Sam Yorty as Mayor of Los Angeles.

Kreedman served as co-chairman of Jerry Brown's 1973 gubernatorial campaign. He was also one of the campaign's largest contributors, having donated US$10,000. Meanwhile, additional donations were also made through the Century Towers Association and the Hotel Alexandria.

== Personal life and death ==
His first wife, Thelma, filed for divorce in 1963, on allegations of "extreme cruelty". With his second wife Marlene, Kreedman had a son, Dale, and a daughter, Barbara.

Kreedman collected vintage cars.

Kreedman died on November 5, 1999, in Los Angeles, California.
