= S. Talbot Smith =

(1861–1948) solicitor, freelance journalist and civic worker

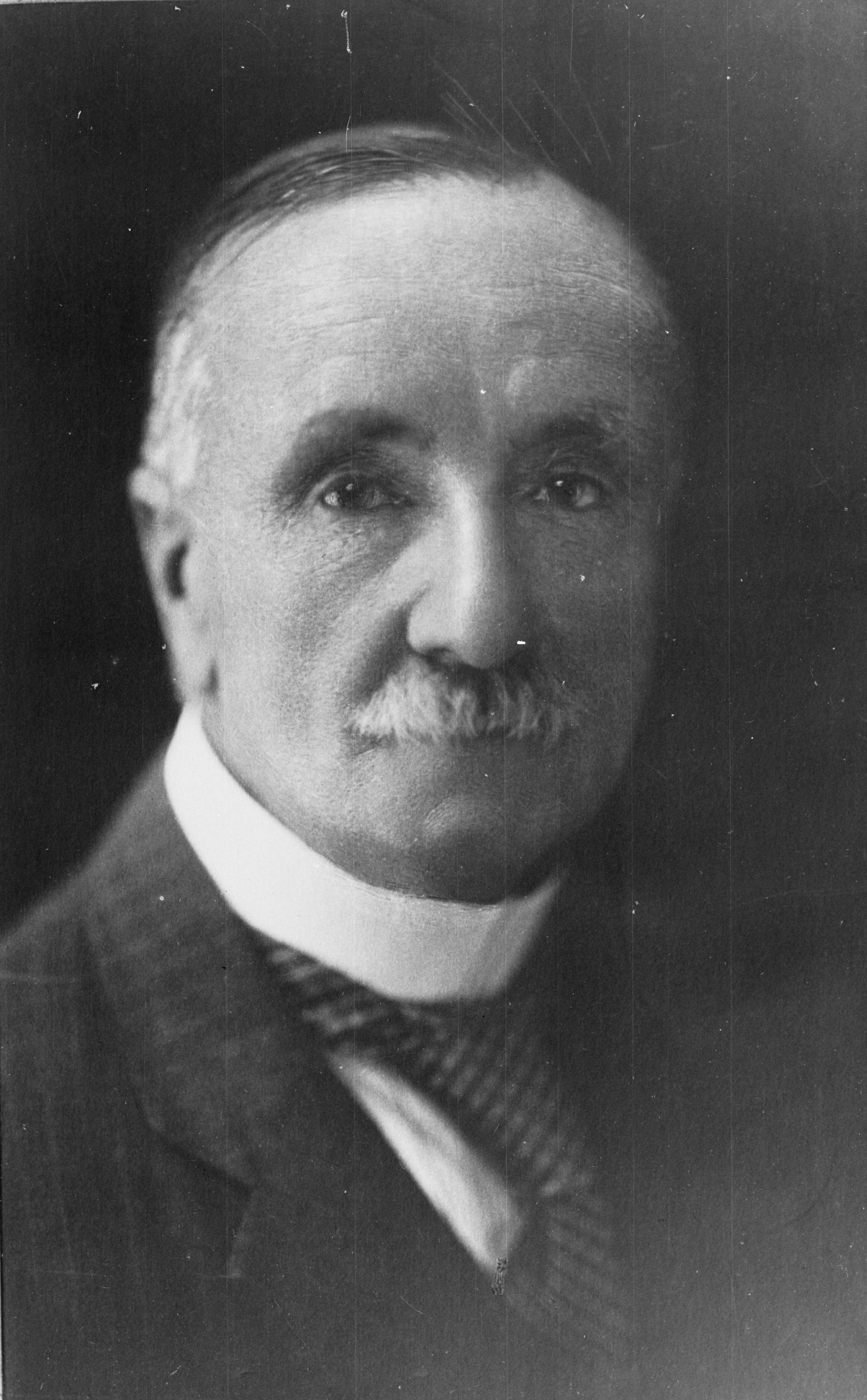
Sydney Talbot Smith, c. 1932

Sydney Talbot Smith OBE (21 April 1861 – 3 October 1948) was a lawyer and journalist in the colony and State of South Australia.

== History ==
Smith was born at Dover House, Burnside, South Australia the only son of (later Sir) Edwin Thomas Smith and Florence Smith, née Stock. His mother died when he was a baby and his father took him and his two-year-old sister to England to be brought up by relatives in Staffordshire and straightaway returned to his extensive business interests in South Australia. He was educated at Tettenhall College, Wolverhampton and studied law at Cambridge University, graduating BA, LLB, MA and was called to the Bar at the Middle Temple in June 1885.

While at Cambridge, Smith immersed himself in the English arts and theatre scene, attending hundreds of plays and exhibitions in London, Manchester and Birmingham. He developed a passion for literature and music, becoming a competent debater, pianist, organist and choral singer and wrote articles for several British weeklies. He was also an active sportsman: swimming, rowing, running, hiking; playing and following lacrosse, cricket and soccer. He learned languages, played billiards, cards and chess. He spent his summer holidays touring America and Europe. All this activity appears not to have unduly affected his studies, no doubt attributable to his phenomenal memory and work ethic.

He returned to Adelaide and entered into a form of partnership with his solicitor uncle William Frederick Stock (1848–1913) in Glenelg as Stock & Talbot Smith, but practice of the Law took second place to his involvement in sport and the arts. He found further, and no doubt more congenial, employment as a freelance journalist; it may have been more remunerative too. For fifty years he was The Bulletin's sport and theatre correspondent; he wrote lead articles and reviews for The Advertiser, and the South Australian Register.

Stock was elected to the House of Assembly in 1887; from 1891 Smith practised alone, mostly as a solicitor.

Smith married Florence Oliver Chettle in 1887; they had a modest home at Halton terrace, Kensington Park and a busy social life. He appears to have had a disdain for wealth: during the 1914–1918 war he drew up, gratis, some 4,000 wills for volunteers; when he was left only £2,000 of his father's estate of some £250,000 he was not disappointed, as he had the benefit of his generosity while a young man, when it counted most.

Florence died on 21 September 1935 as a result of the crash two days earlier of the car Smith was driving and in which she was a passenger. Smith had failed to anticipate or notice a truck turning across his path and, realising he had no chance of stopping in time, attempted to accelerate out of trouble, clipped the rear of the truck and slewed into a tram pole. At the inquest, the Coroner refused to impute carelessness to Smith, though that was a popular feeling.

== Other interests ==
Smith was best known to the public as a panel member of the weekly program "Information Please" broadcast on Radio 5AD from 1940 to 1949. It was broadcast "live" with a studio audience, with the "experts" attempting to answer questions sent in by listeners. Other panelists were Dr. J. J. Bray, A. M. Bills (a master at SPC) and Steve McKee (football journalist). He was also

- chairman of the advisory committee of the Commonwealth Literary Fund
- president for of the Public Library, Art Gallery and Museum Board and that body was split, he was appointed chairman of the Public Library Board.
- president of the Adelaide Repertory Theatre
- vice-president of the School of Arts and Crafts
- for more than 20 years a member of the University of Adelaide Council and Finance Committee
- in 1905 president of the South Australian Literary Societies' Union
- president and patron of the East Torrens cricket, lacrosse and football associations
- president of the Amateur Athletic Association
- member of the ground and finance committee of the SA Cricket Association

== Recognition ==
Talbot Smith was awarded an OBE in 1941.

== Family ==
S. (Sydney) Talbot Smith BA LLB (1861– 3 October 1948) married Florence Oliver Chettle (died 21 September 1935) on 2 June 1887; their children were:

- Guy Talbot Smith (1888 – 19??) married Mary Goldworth Tilemann in 1916. They had a property at Coromandel Valley
- Eric W. (Wilkes) Talbot Smith (28 April 1892 – 26 April 1915) killed at Gallipoli.
- Donald Oliver Lang Smith, later known as Don Talbot Smith (1894 – 1960)
- Bruce Talbot Smith (1900 – ) married Gladys Louise Brown ( – ) in 1923. He married again, to Hazel Lilah Crafter in 1931. A sharebroker, he had a property in the Inman Valley
