= Beinhart =

Beinhart may be:

- Larry Beinhart (fl. 1990s), American novelist and journalist
- Werner – Beinhart!, a 1990 film based on the German comic books

== See also ==
- Beinart (disambiguation)
