= Bryceson Treharne =

Welsh-born Composer, lecturer, musician and educator

Bryceson Treharne ARSM
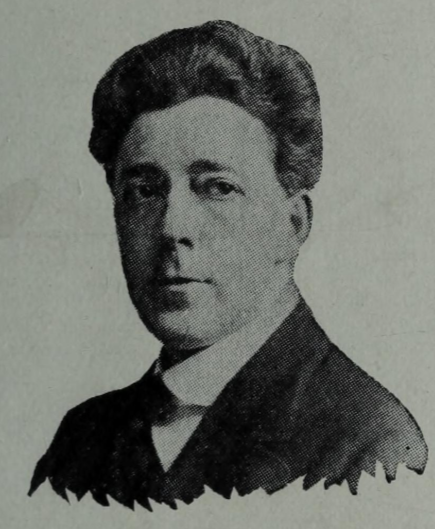
- Bryceson Treharne in 1919
- Born: William Treharne; 30 May 1877 (Note: Incorrectly listed as 30 May 1879, even by Treharne himself; however, his primary source birth certificate shows the year to be 1877.); Merthyr Tydfil, Glamorganshire, Wales
- Died: February 4, 1948 (aged 70); Woodside, Queens, New York, United States
- Resting place: Fresh Pond Crematory
- Other names: Kenneth Downing; Jeffrey Marlowe; Chester Wallis; Richard Mayne; Wayne Norman; Richard Harding; Freeman High
- Occupations: Composer, musician, academic
- Employer: University of Adelaide
- Spouse: Maud Thackeray Thompson (m. 1914)
- Children: 1 son, Anthony
- Parents: David Treharne (father); Gwenllian Roberts (mother)

Bryceson Treharne (born William Treharne, 30 May 1877 – 4 February 1948) was a Welsh composer, musician and academic.

== Early life and education ==
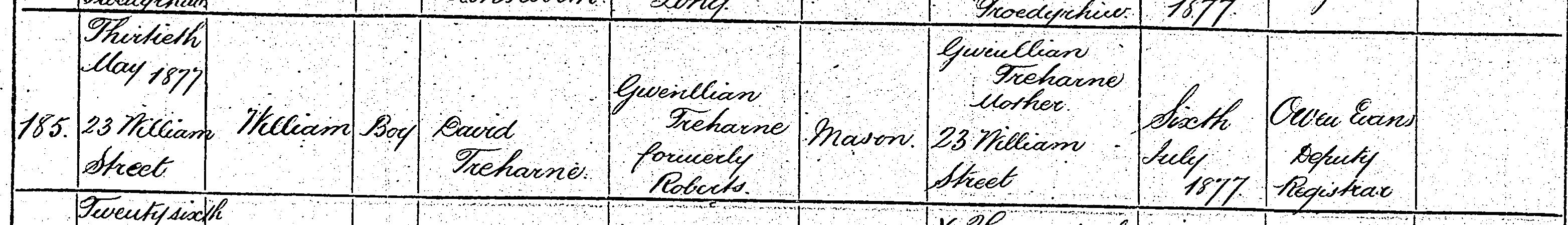
Bryceson Treharne Birth Certificate 1877

Treharne was born William Treharne on 30 May 1877 (often incorrectly listed as 1879), in Merthyr Tydfill, Wales to stonemason, David Treharne and his wife, Gwellian Roberts.

In 1893, Treharne attended the Royal College of Music, being awarded the Erard Scholarship and gaining his ABRSM music qualifications. Whilst at the RCM, he studied piano with Franklin Taylor (who studied under Clara Schumann), Edward Dannreuther and Austrian pianist Ernst Pauer, organ with Sir Walter Parratt, theory and composition with Charles Villiers Stanford, Sir Frederick Bridge, and Hubert Parry.

In 1930, at the age of 53, Treharne completed his Doctor of Music degree at McGill University, with his thesis entitled Musical compositions.

== Early career ==
Following the completion of his studies, Treharne began teaching Piano Forte at the Aberystwyth University College in Wales. Before, in 1900, moving to Adelaide in the Province of South Australia, where he was appointed as the Piano Forte master at the University of Adelaide's Elder Conservatorium of Music, with prominent students being operatic soprano, Clytie Hine and pianist, Maude Mary Puddy.

During his time in Adelaide, he performed a number of public concerts, including preparing and performing the musical arrangement for Muriel Matters 1902 performance of Alfred, Lord Tennyson's tragic poem, Enoch Arden at the Adelaide Town Hall in conjunction with the University of Adelaide's Elder Conservatorium of Music, where Treharne was working. Treharne was also instrumental in the creation of the Adelaide Repertory Theatre in 1908. Treharne remained in Adelaide until December 1911, when he returned to London, and later married his wife, Maud in 1914.

== Wartime internment ==
In late 1914, shortly after marrying his wife, Treharne and Maud travelled to Bavaria in Germany to attend the Wagner Festspiel music festival, however, with the outbreak of World War I, as British subjects, they were both interned by German authorities in the Ruhleben internment camp, outside Berlin.

In late November 1914, Treharne's wife, Maud, was released from the camp and returned to London; and thereafter worked for the release of her husband and others from the camp. During his internment in the camp, Treharne continued to compose music, and worked with other prisoners to perform musical and theatrical performances for other prisoners, including composing a score for a performance of As you like it given in 1915. Reports suggest that Treharne composed more than 200 songs while in prison. Treharne was released from the camp in December 1915, being evacuated to England in exchange for German prisoners.

== Later career and retirement ==
Shortly after Treharne's release from German internment, he sailed to New York, where his wife and son had moved earlier. In 1924, the family left New York and moved to Montreal, where Treharne became a lecturer at McGill University, and Choirmaster of an American Church in Montreal. Treharne and his family returned to the United States in 1928, becoming the music editor of the Boston Music Company, where he remained until his retirement in November 1947.

== Death ==
Treharne died in New York in 1948 at his home 40–21 69th Street, Woodside, Queens. His funeral was held on 6 February 1948, at the New York Funeral Chapel at 148 East 74th Street. Treharne was cremated at the Fresh Pond Crematory in Queens, New York. Following his death, his widow and son moved to the nearby city of New Jersey.

== Personal life and family ==
It was incorrectly reported in 1912 that Treharne had become engaged and subsequently married to Australian-born suffragist, Muriel Matters, on his return to London; however, this was incorrect.

=== Maud Thackeray Thompson ===
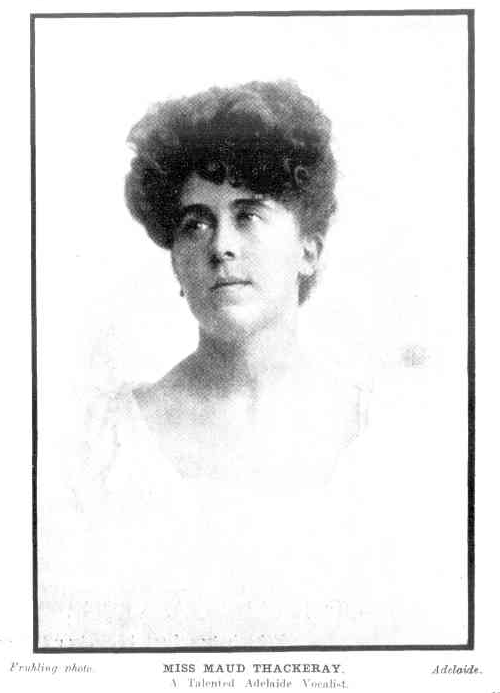
Treharne's wife, Maud Thackeray Treharne (née Thompson), 1906

In March 1914, he married soprano singer, Maud Thackeray Thompson (known professionally as Miss Maud Thackeray) in London. (Note: The name Thackeray at birth for both 'Maud' and 'Arline' was spelt Thackray.) Treharne met Maud in Adelaide, after she had immigrated from London in 1905 with her sister, Arline Thackeray Thompson (1879–1949), a violinist, known professionally as Miss Arline Thackeray, both seeking to pursue a career as musicians and teachers. (Note: Not to be confused with the daughter of Arline Thackeray Thompson and Ernest T Porter, Arline Thackeray Louisson (née Porter) (1918–1969).) Maud had performed on a number of occasions with Treharne at Adelaide Concerts.

Treharne's sister-in-law, Arline Thackeray, later immigrated to New Zealand in 1906, pursuing her career as a violinist and teacher, and in 1909 she married Ernest T Porter. Between 1924 and 1925, Maud visited her sister in New Zealand, where she taught opera, oratorio, and song repertoire to students.

In 1916, Treharne and his wife, Maud had a son, Gwyn Francis 'Frank' Treharne (1916–1983) (also known as Anthony Francis Bryceson Treharne).

== Select songs and arrangements ==
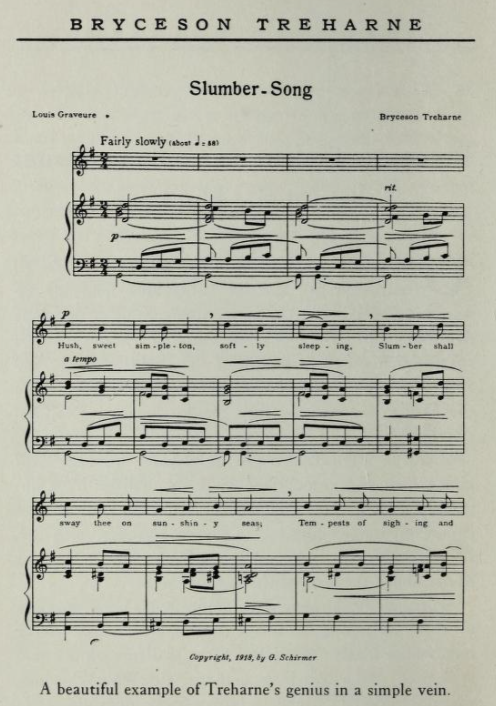
Treharne's "Slumber Song" (1918)

Treharne wrote and arranged a considerable number of songs and music during his long career, under both his own name and that of several pseudonyms, including:

- Kenneth Downing
- Jeffrey Marlowe
- Chester Wallis
- Richard Mayne
- Wayne Norman
- Richard Harding
- Freeman High

Select songs and arrangements by Treharne, include:

- "A Song of Spring".
- "The Voice of Spring".
- "Slumber Song".
- "The Soldier".
- "Remember me when I am gone away".
- "A song of France".
- "England My Mother".
- "The Banshee".
- "Mother, My Dear".
- "O Divine Redeemer".
- "The Coventry Carol".
- "A Lover's Prayer".
- "Dirge for a Fallen Soldier".
- "Prayer" from Engelbert Humperdinck's opera Hansel and Gretel (arr.).

Treharne also edited several musical scores, including the The Pirates of Penzance for the New York City Opera's 1940's production.

== See also ==
- Muriel Matters
- Elder Conservatorium of Music
- Adelaide Repertory Theatre
- Thomas Traherne
