= Bernard Cherrick =

British-Israeli rabbi and academic administrator

- ברנרד צ'ריק
- Born: 1914; Dublin, Ireland
- Died: 22 December 1988 (aged 73–74); Jerusalem, Israel
- Education: London School of Economics; University of Manchester
- Occupation: Academic administrator

Bernard Cherrick (Hebrew: ברנרד צ'ריק; 1914–1988) was a British-Israeli rabbi and academic administrator. He served as the vice-president of the Hebrew University of Jerusalem. He brought many Hollywood celebrities to fundraisers on campus and was nicknamed "Mr. Hebrew University".

== Early life ==
Bernard Cherrick was born in 1914 in Dublin, Ireland. He grew up in England, where he was educated in a yeshiva. He had a sister, Freda Sklan.

Cherrick graduated from the London School of Economics. He earned a master's degree from the University of Manchester in 1937.

== Career ==
In 1939, in the midst of World War II, Cherrick served as a rabbi in the British Expeditionary Force of the British Army. He also served as the rabbi of the New Synagogue in Stamford Hill, North London. He served as a director of the Jewish National Fund and the United Israel Appeal.

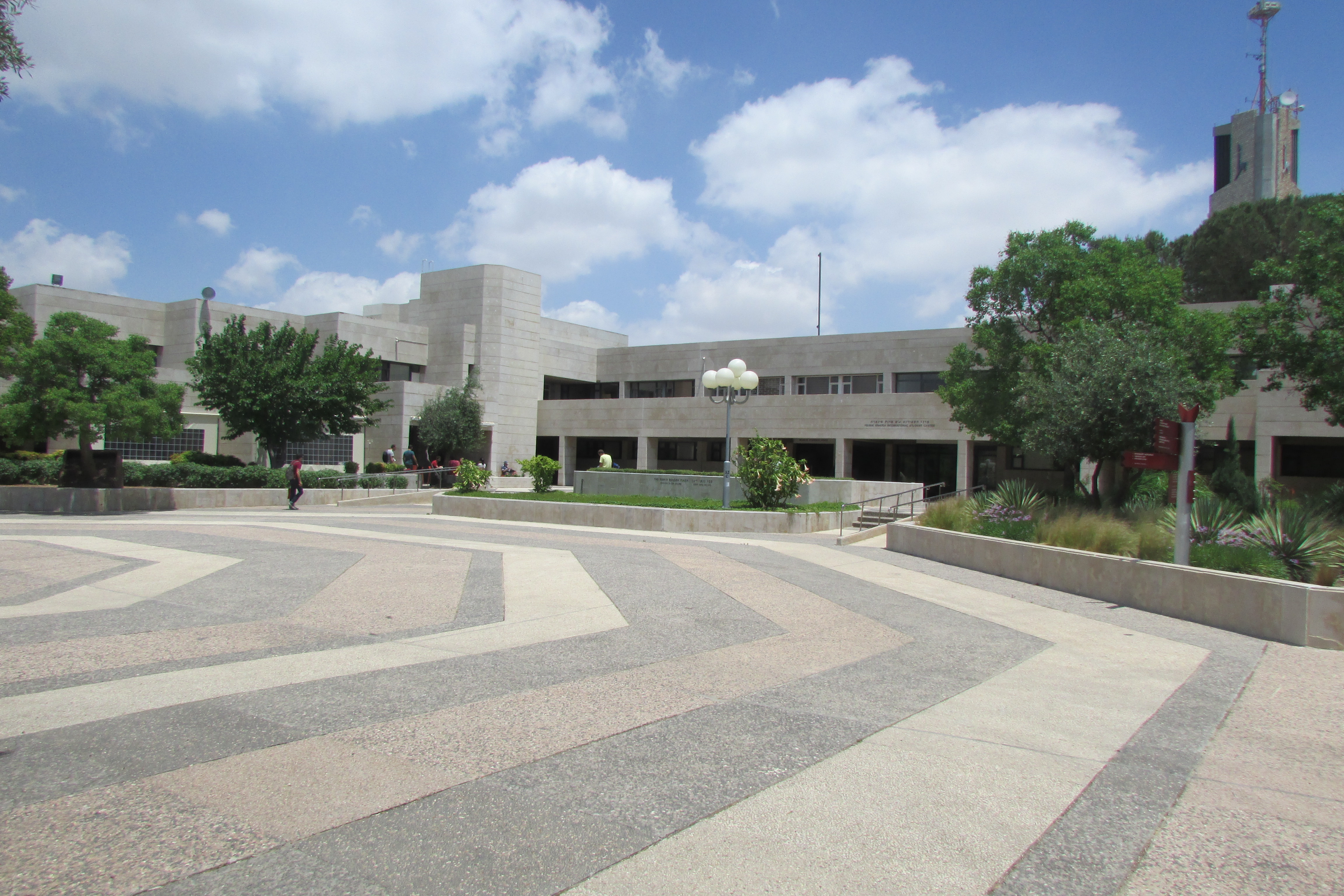
The Frank Sinatra International Student Centre.

Cherrick made aliyah to join the public relations department of the Hebrew University of Israel in 1947. Cherrick was in charge of fundraising for the university. He was asked by Chaim Weizmann, the first president of Israel, to take a speaking tour in Australia, whereby 10% of his speaking fees would go to the university. He made many similar fundraising trips in the next few decades. As early as 1949, he welcomed a US$50,000 fund from philanthropist Louis M. Rabinowitz of Brooklyn, New York City to research synagogues in the Near East.

Cherrick was appointed as the vice-president of the university in 1968. After meeting Harvey Silbert, Cherrick, he convinced Frank Sinatra to donate to the university and endow the construction of the Frank Sinatra International Student Centre on campus. He subsequently invited Hollywood celebrities like Billy Crystal, Gregory Peck, Barbra Streisand, to fundraisers on campus. He became known as "Mr. Hebrew University", until he retired in 1988.

== Death and legacy ==
Cherrick died on 22 December 1988 in Jerusalem, Israel. He is the namesake of HJU's Cherrick Center for the Study of Zionism, the Yishuv and the State of Israel, directed by Hillel Cohen. It organises the monthly Cherrick Forum meetings, also named in his honour.
