= Romanoff and Juliet (play) =

1956 comedic play by Peter Ustinov

- Written by: Peter Ustinov
- Original language: English
- Subject: inspired by Romeo and Juliet and the Cold War
- Genre: Comedy
- Setting: The Main Square in the Capital City of the smallest country in Europe.

Premiere
- Date premiered: 2 April 1956
- Place premiered: Opera House; Manchester, England

Romanoff and Juliet is a play by Peter Ustinov. A comic spoof of the Cold War, it is set in the small mythical mid-European country of Concordia, whose leader is wooed by the United States and the Soviet Union, each one wanting him as an ally. Russia's ambassador, a member of the Romanoff family, has a son Igor who falls in love with Juliet, the daughter of the US diplomat. The two opposing families, one communist, the other capitalist, represent the warring Capulets and Montagues of Romeo and Juliet.

The play premiered in Manchester, England on 2 April 1956. The Broadway production, produced by David Merrick and directed by George S. Kaufman, opened on 10 October 1957 at the Plymouth Theatre and ran for 389 performances.

The opening night cast included Peter Ustinov as the General, Gerald Sarracini as Igor, and Elizabeth Allen as Juliet, with Fred Clark, Natalie Schafer, and Jack Gilford in supporting roles.

Ustinov was nominated for Tony Awards for Best Play and Best Actor in Play. In 1961 Ustinov directed and starred in the film adaptation Romanoff and Juliet of the play.
