= William Shernoff =

American lawyer

William M. Shernoff
- Born: c. 1955; Wisconsin, U.S.
- Occupation: Lawyer
- Spouse: Jilda Shernoff
- Children: 1 daughter

William M. Shernoff (born c.1949) is an American trial lawyer based in Claremont, California/Beverly Hills, USA. He practices a branch of law known as "insurance bad faith", in which he investigates the alleged bad faith and misconduct of insurance companies. began in 1971 with his first insurance case. He then founded the firm of Shernoff Bidart Echeverria LLP, in 2004.

Shernoff is the author and co-author of several books on law, including Bad Faith (1984), Payment Refused (1986), How to Make Insurance Companies Pay Your Claims and What to Do If They Don't (1990) and Fight Back & Win (1999). He has served on the board of directors of the national insurance consumer organization, United Policyholders.

== Early life ==
William M. Shernoff was born circa 1949 in Wisconsin. His father was a lawyer.

== Career ==
In 1979, Shernoff won a landmark case amounting to $86 million for the MGM Grand Hotel in Las Vegas when the insurance company failed to meet its obligations after the fire which devastated the hotel.

Cyclone Val was a tropical cyclone that devastated American Samoa in December 1991. In 1991, American Samoa had purchased a $45-million "all risk" insurance policy from the firm Affiliated FM Insurance. The firm would only pay $6.1 million for the damages, arguing that the insurance did not cover water damage, only that driven by the wind. Shernoff stated that the insurance company had altered American Samoa's insurance policy to exclude damages caused by "wind-driven water", despite it still covering hurricanes. In 1995 a jury awarded the American Samoa Government $28.9 million, and then added twice that amount ($57.8 million) for punitive damages. The total award in the final judgment was $86.7 million, which was stated to be the largest insurance bad faith judgment in the state of California, in 1995.

Shernoff also won cases against Generali insurance on behalf of Holocaust victims, which paved the way for a five billion dollar settlement for Holocaust victim restitution in 2002.

Shernoff has ranked on The Best Lawyers in America, every year since its first edition in 1983.

== Personal life ==
Shernoff married Jilda Shernoff in Beverly Hills, California.
