= Economy of Coimbatore =

Economy of Coimbatore is heavily influenced by information technology, engineering and textiles. Coimbatore is called the Manchester of South India due to its extensive textile industry and IT industry, small- and medium-scale enterprises. The GDP (gross domestic product) of Coimbatore is around $45 billion (2021). It is the second largest city by GDP in Tamil Nadu. The city has four special economic zones [SEZ], ELCOT SEZ, KGISL SEZ, SPAN Venture SEZ, Aspen SEZ and at least five more SEZs are in the pipeline. In 2010, Coimbatore ranked 15th in the list of most competitive (by business environment) Indian cities.

Coimbatore has trade associations like CODISSIA, COINDIA and COJEWEL representing industries in the city. Coimbatore also has a 160,000 square feet (15,000 m^{2}) of trade fair ground, built in 1999. It was named COINTEC due to its hosting of INTEC (Small Industries Exhibition). The Trade Fair complex, one of the country's largest, was built in six months and is owned by CODISSIA (Coimbatore District Small Industries Association). It is also the country's largest pillar-free hall, according to the Limca Book of Records.

== Textiles ==
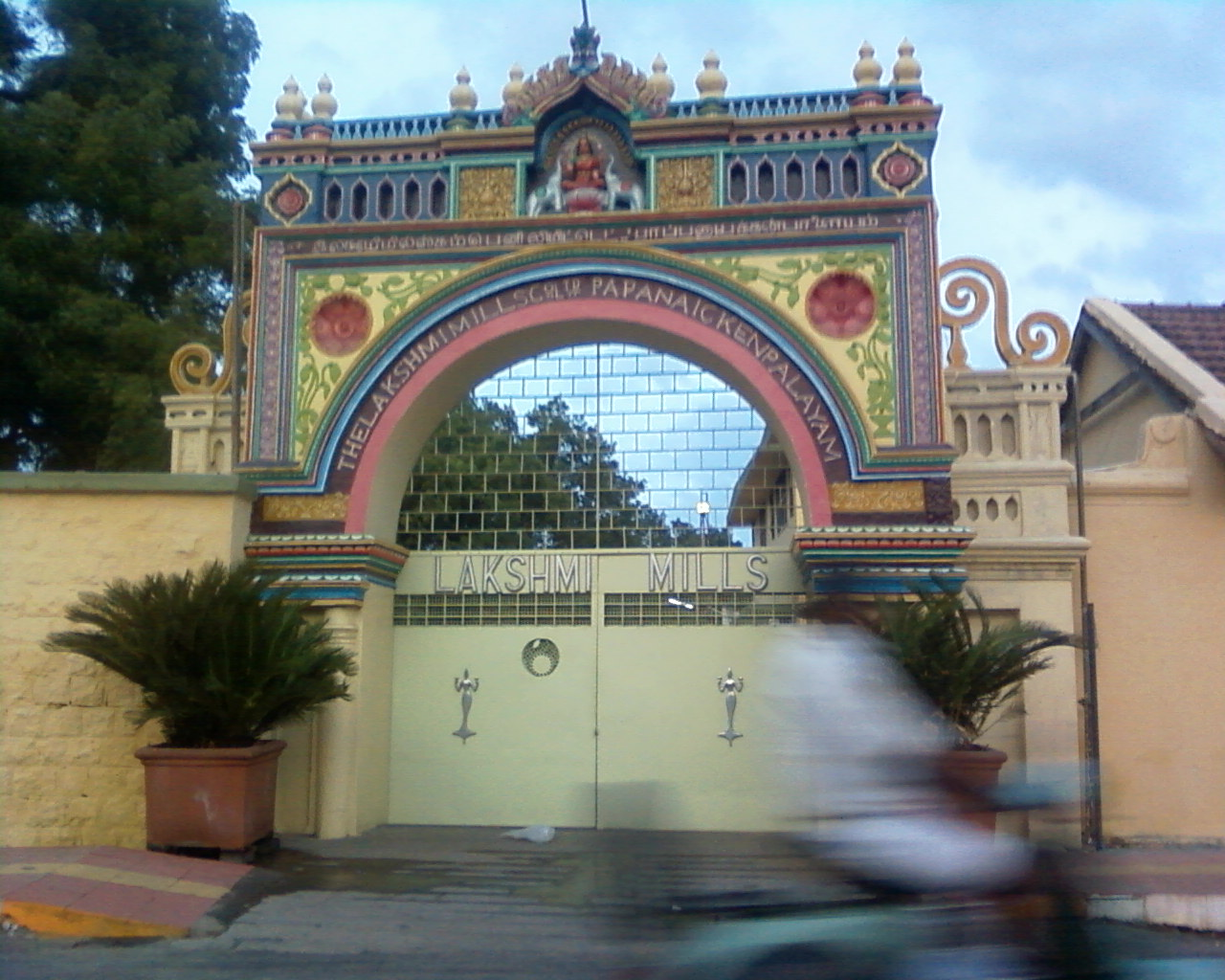
Lakshmi Mills, established in 1910 in Avinashi Road

Coimbatore houses a large number of small, medium, and large textile mills, along with a number of textile research institutes. The city also houses two of the Centers Of Excellences (COE) for technical textiles proposed by Government of India, namely Meditech, a medical textile research centre based at SITRA, and InduTech based in PSG College of Technology. There are several large textile mills in the city such as Lakshmi Mills, Shiva Texyarn Limited, Bannari Amman Spinning Mill, SKS spinning mills, Kadri Mills, Varadharaja Textile Mill, KPR Mills, Premier Mills, world-famous micro cotton towel producers - Sharadha Terry Products etc.

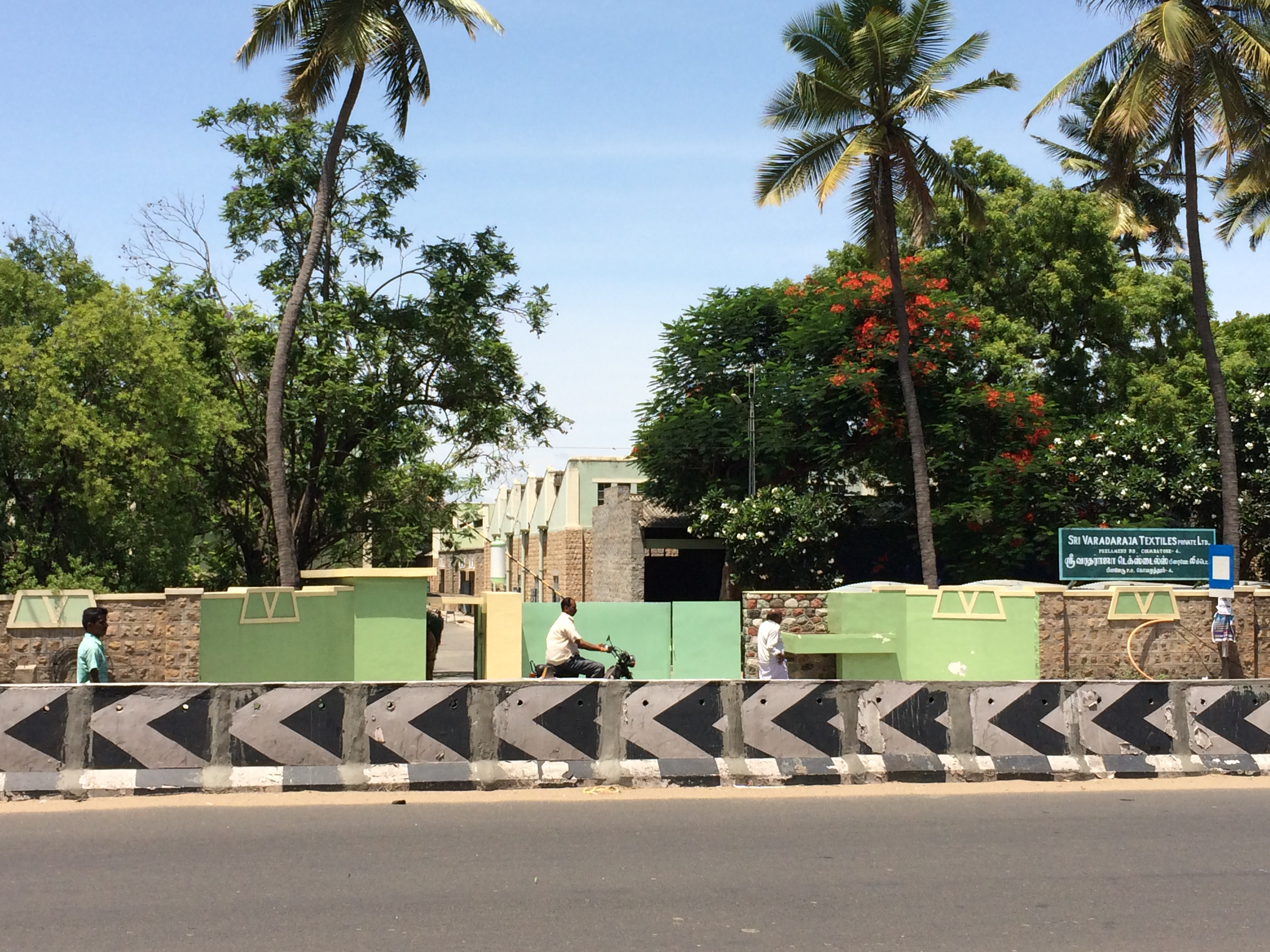
A textile mill in Avinashi Road

National Textile Corporation is a company owned by the Indian government, which has 5 Mill units in Coimbatore:

- Coimbatore Murugan Mills
- Cambodia Mills
- Coimbatore Spinning and Weaving Mill
- Pankaja Mills
- Sri Rangavilas Mills

The neighbouring town of Tirupur is home to some of Asia's largest garment manufacturing companies, exporting hosiery clothes worth more than ₹ 50,000 million.

== Manufacturing ==
Coimbatore has a large and diversified manufacturing sector, supported by the presence of companies such as Sakthi Group, Bannari Amman Group, Lakshmi Machine Works, Larsen & Toubro, Schneider Electric, General Electric, Alstom, ZF Friedrichshafen, Mahle GmbH, Konecranes, Pricol, PEEPL Automation, V-Guard Industries, Suzlon, ARGO-HYTOS, Titan, Flowserve, KSB, Makino, Messer, Gilbarco Veeder-Root, Bradken, Rieter, VWR International, Hella, Shanthi Gears, ITC Limited, ACC Cements, TTK Prestige, Kirloskar Group, Hirotec, ELGI Equipments, Roots Industries, Salzer Electronics, Mak Controls and systems, Texmo Industries, SE Electricals, FASCO Coimbatore (Factory Automation and Solutions Company) and others.

ITC Limited has a large manufacturing facility spread over a 411-acre campus. Larsen & Toubro also has a large manufacturing facility spread over a 300-acre campus. There are more than 25,000 small, medium, large sale industries in the city. Coimbatore also has Engineering SEZ in the outskirts of city, "Aspen SEZ" spread over 376 acres. CODISSIA Industrial Park is being set up at Moperipalayam nearly 260 acres and at Kallapalayam nearly 150 acres. The city already has industrial estates owned by SIDCO at Kurichi, SIDCO at Malumichampatti, Electrical & Electronics Industrial Estate at Kalapatti, and Sree Suba Ganesh Industrial estate near Kovilpalayam. The large number of engineering colleges in the region have produced around 50,000 engineers.

Lakshmi Machine Works is India's largest textile machinery and CNC Machine Tool manufacturers based out of Coimbatore.

=== Engineering procurement and tooling ===
More than 50,000 engineering units function in and around Coimbatore city. What began as a focused centre for the manufacture of textile motors in the early 1900s has today become a multidisciplinary entity that is capable of catering to voluminous demands in the international market. Tooling Divisions were incepted primarily as captive units for manufacturing houses and have become a major engineering activity in the city today; several such companies offer precision tooling services to global industries. The light engineering industry in the Coimbatore region also specializes in offering customized engineering solutions for diverse requirements.

=== Automotive engineering and components ===
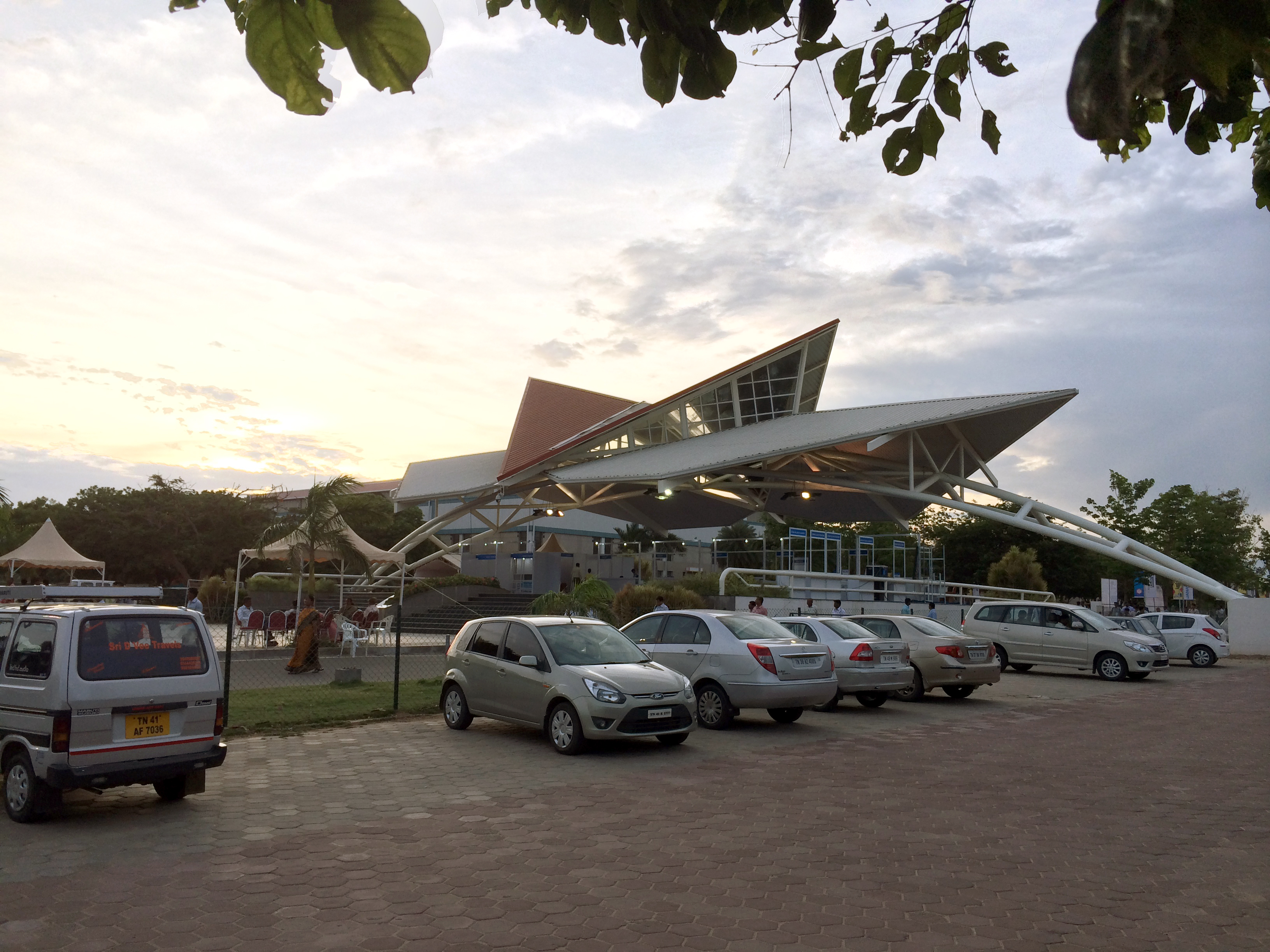
CODISSIA Trade Fair Complex, Coimbatore 2014

Coimbatore has emerged as one of the most trusted outsourcing destinations for the auto component industry. Several factors have contributed to this growth, including readily available resources and skilled technical talent. Technical Partnerships and strategic alliances with global manufacturers have given the Coimbatore auto component industry more mileage in the international market. Today, auto majors with a growing presence in India source both major components and sub-assemblies from the city. Several international automotive manufacturers source components ranging from exhaust systems to braking systems, seating, electronic and electrical components, mechanical engine parts, body components, and suspensions and radiators among others.

Many auto component manufacturing companies are OE partners to multinational brands. Textool was one such company that once designed and supplied Sten Guns to the Indian Government after independence. They also developed the first in-house-designed car in the 1960s, which never saw the light of day due to the license raj. They made several prototypes until the 1990s. They successfully manufactured India's first indigenously developed diesel engines in 1972 for cars and their own CNC lathes in 1982. Today their spin-off company, Jayem Automotives Pvt Ltd, offers R & D services to Tata Motors, Renault, Volvo, Eicher, Daimler, TVS, Hero Motors, and Robert Bosch GmbH. Maruti Suzuki and Tata Motors source up to 30% of their automotive components from Coimbatore. Some of the countries leading auto component makers based in Coimbatore include Pricol, Hirotec, Craftsman Automation, and Roots Industry. Apart from this, Robert Bosch GmbH has a large technical centre in the city.

=== Wet grinders and Home appliances ===
As of 2015, Coimbatore has more than 700 wet grinder manufacturers with a monthly output of 75,000 units per every 100,000 produced in India. The term "Coimbatore Wet Grinder" was given a Geographical indication for wet grinders manufactured in Coimbatore in 2006. Coimbatore is also home to a common facility for the manufacturers of wet grinders.

=== Motor and pumps ===
Coimbatore is also called the Pump City of Asia and has played a dominant role in the agricultural sector since independence, holding a major portion of the total Indian market share. The first motor to be manufactured in India came from a small engineering shop in Coimbatore. Today, the pump and motor manufacturing sector is among the largest engineering activities in the city. Over the years, the city has become as well known for its pumps as it has for its textiles. Many brands in the international market are Coimbatore-based companies, and the quality and technical superiority of the products has helped the sector cater to both domestic and global demands. Apart from a leading presence in the water pump market, the city's manufacturing houses also specialize in the manufacture of industrial pumps. The motor and pump industry supplies over 40% of India's requirements.

=== Jewellery and gems ===
Coimbatore is one of the major gold jewellery manufacturing hubs in India, renowned for making cast jewellery and machine-made jewellery. The city is home to about 3000 jewellery manufacturing companies and over 40,000 goldsmiths. The jewellery manufacturers have an active association called Coimbatore Jewellery Manufacturers' Association and have also jointly established Coimbatore Gem and Jewellery Industries Private Limited (Cojewel), which is a common facility with niche goldsmith machinery to be used by the members of the association.

Several jewellery retail chains like Emerald Jewel Industry, Kirtilal's are based in Coimbatore or have their manufacturing base in Coimbatore. Owing to the presence of a large number of jewellery manufacturers and the strong engineering base, the city is home to a number of companies manufacturing jewellery-making machinery. The city is also a major diamond cutting centre in South India. For example, Kirtilal's Jewellers alone have 5 diamond cutting and polishing centres in Coimbatore. Gold Jewellery Industrial Park is planned to be set up at Kurichi SIDCO in Coimbatore at the cost of Rs.126 crore.

== Information Technology and BPO ==
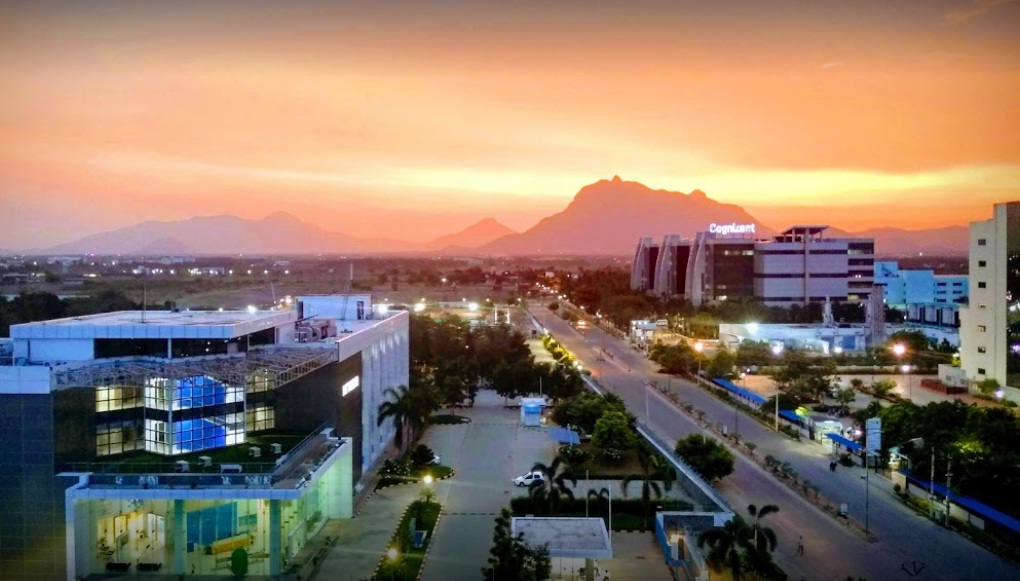
IT SEZ at Saravanampatti

The city is the second largest software producer in Tamil Nadu, next only to Chennai. IT and BPO industry in the city has grown greatly with the launch of TIDEL Park Coimbatore, ELCOT IT PARK & Wipro Software Development Centre @ ELCOT SEZ. Bosch, Cognizant, NTT Data Development Centres & Indialand Techpark @ KGISL SEZ. KCT TechPark, SVB Techpark, Global Techpark, Hanudev Infopark, TICEL BioPark, Rathinam Technopark, KGISL Campus, Span Venture SEZ, ELCOT IT Park-II @ Neelambur, Elysium Central and other planned IT parks in and around the city.

It is ranked at 17th among the global outsourcing cities. Companies like Amazon, Accenture, Bosch, Blue Yonder- Subsidiary of Panasonic, Birlasoft, Cognizant, Capgemini, Dassault Systèmes, Deloitte, PwC, Ernst & Young, Ford, Flextronics, IBM, Tata Technologies, Tata Consultancy Services, Infosys, Wipro, HCL, Tech Mahindra, Mahindra Rise, MSCI, LTIMindtree, Cameron International, NTT DATA, Harman- Subsidiary of Samsung Electronics, Sutherland, Moody's Analytics, Hexaware, ThoughtWorks, Tessolve, Applied Materials, IQVIA, State Street Corporation, Owler, UST Global, Visteon, VWR International, EPAM Systems, Zoho Corporation, Embitel Technologies - A Volkswagen company, and Hella all have a presence in the city. Cognizant has the second largest headcount in the country with more than 16,000+ employees based in the city. Bosch has one of the largest development centers in Coimbatore outside Germany, with 10,000 employees based in the city. Software export stood at more than ₹15,000 crores for the financial year 2018–2019, which is second largest in the state after Chennai.

SEZ

- ELCOT SEZ - Government owned IT/ITS SEZ
- KGISL SEZ - Private owned IT/ITS SEZ
- SPAN SEZ - Private owned IT/ITS SEZ
- Aspen SEZ – Private owned Industrial SEZ

IT Parks

- TIDEL Park Coimbatore @ ELCOT SEZ, Peelamedu
- ELCOT IT PARK @ ELCOT SEZ, Peelamedu
- IndiaLand TechPark @ KGISL SEZ, Saravanampatti
- Global Techpark, Kalapatti
- SVB TechPark, Kurumpalayam Road
- Hanudev Infopark, Nava India
- KCT Techpark, Saravanampatti
- Rathinam Technopark, Eachanari
- KGISL Campus, Saravanampatti
- TICEL Biopark, Maruthamalai Road
- KPR Tech Park, Neelambur
- Aditya Techno Park, Saravanampatti
- L&T IT Park, L&T ByPass Road - Under Construction
- Wynfra Cypercity IT Park @ KGISL SEZ, Saravanampatti -Under Construction
- Tanny CAG Tech Park, Sathy Main Road- Under Construction
- Globus Arima Cloudscape IT Park, Vilankurichi - Under Construction
- FinTech Hub, Coimbatore- Planned
- Tanny Infini Business Park, Saravanampatti - Planned
- Tanny SENCO Info Park, Ottakkalmandapam - Planned
- One KPR IT Park, Neelambur - Planned
- New IT Park @ ELCOT SEZ, Peelamedu - Planned
- ELCOT IT Park, Neelambur - Planned
- Sri Shakthi Technew Park, Chinniampalayam- Planned
- Techcity, Coimbatore - Planned in 250 acres

Branded Co-Working Space

- IndiQube
- Smartworks
- WorkEZ
- Regus

== Aerospace & Defence ==
Coimbatore is being selected for Defense Corridor of Tamil Nadu, and State Government is planned to set up Defense & Aero Park at Sulur around 500 acres. Already, major MNC's have a large manufacturing plant in the city for Aerospace & Defense products.

- Larsen & Toubro @ Malumichampatti
- L&T MBDA Missile Systems @ Aspen SEZ, Karumathampatti
- Lakshmi Machine Works
- Pricol
- Roots Industries

Aerospace & Defence related Industrial Parks

- Defence Industrial Park, Varapatti-380 Acres
- Aerospace Industrial Park, Sulur -200 Acres
- Dual Use Industrial Park, Annur- 1000+ Acres

== Central Government Units ==
- Indian Air Force @ Sulur
- INS Agrani @ Red Fields, Puliakulam
- Indian Army Regiment @ Madukkarai
- Central Reserve Police Force @ Thoppampatti
- Border Security Force @ Kittampalayam

== Railways & Telecommunication ==
Indian Railways has a Manufacturing Plant in the city for Signal & Telecommunication, and it is one of the important Telecommunication manufacturing facility for Indian Railways.

- Southern Railway Signal & Telecom(S&T) Workshop in Podanur- Largest Telecom & Signal Industry among all 7 S&T across the country.

Alstom, a French multinational company operating worldwide in rail transport markets has Asia's largest Component manufacturing facility in the city.

== Electrical & Electronics Companies ==
- L&T Electronic Products & Systems (LTEPS)
- Salzer Electronics
- Lakshmi Electrical Drives
- Roots Industries India Limited

== Paper ==
- ITC Limited has a manufacturing facility in Coimbatore for Paperboards & Speciality Paper division.

== Government Printing Press ==
Government of India Press, Coimbatore is a printing agency spread across 132.07 acre campus in Press colony at Coimbatore in the state of Tamil Nadu, which is owned and managed by the Government of India and responsible for printing national and public documents.

== Cements ==
ACC Cements have a large cement manufacturing plant in Coimbatore.

== Poultry and food products ==
Coimbatore has a large number of poultry farms and is one of the major producers of chicken, eggs, and processed meat amounting to nearly 95% of the chicken meat exports from the country. Major companies include Suguna Foods and Shanthi Feeds.

Coimbatore has some of the oldest flour mills in India. The large-scale flour mills, which cater to all the southern states, have a combined grinding capacity of more than 50,000 MT per month. The city houses many famous high-capacity flour mills, like India Roller Flour Mills (now closed) and Coimbatore Roller Flour Mills.

== Retail and e-commerce ==
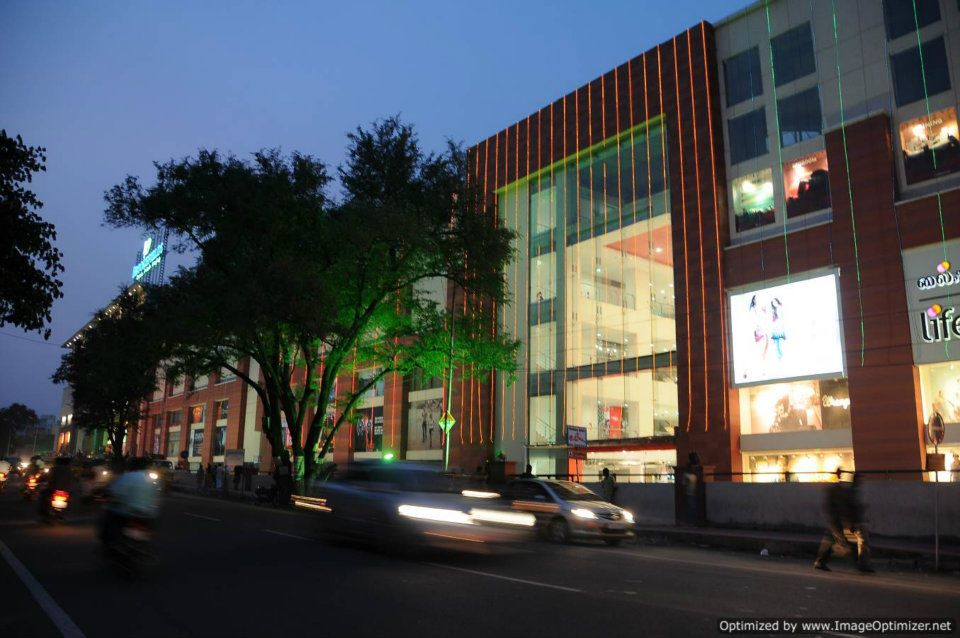
Brookefields Mall

There are a number of retail outlets, supermarkets and shopping malls in Coimbatore. The city has major shopping malls, such as Brookefields Mall and Fun Republic Mall, as well as popular cinemas including PVR Cinemas and IMAX. Coimbatore is already the largest non-metro city for e-commerce in South India, due to growing online shopping, e-ticketing and e-billing adaptation in the city.

Malls

- Brookefields Mall
- Fun Republic Mall
- Prozone Mall
- Broadway Mall
- Alveal Fun Savvy Mall
- Phoenix Mall- Under Construction

Branded Cinemas

- The Cinema by PVR Cinemas - 6 Screens
- PVR Cinemas- 5 Screens
- INOX- 9 Screens
- Cinépolis - 5 Screens
- Miraj Cinemas - 5 Screens
- Broadway Cinemas / EPIQ / IMAX - 9 Screens

E-commerce Warehouses

- Amazon Fulfillment Center
- Flipkart Fulfillment Center
- TVS Supply Chain Solutions
- Multi-Modal Logistics Parks- (Initial Stage)

== Hotels ==
5-Star Hotels

- Le Méridien Coimbatore
- Vivanta by Taj
- Welcomhotel by ITC Hotels
- Radisson Blu
- The Residency Towers, Coimbatore
- Merlis Hotel

4-Star Hotels

- O By Tamara
- Zone by The Park Hotel
- Zone Connect by The Park
- Lemon Tree Hotels
- Fairfield by Marriott
- M Inn Hotels (Formerly Hash Six)
- Hotel Vijay Elanza
- The Grand Regent
- IKON by Annapoorna
- Hotel Kiscol Grands
- Gokulam Park

== See also ==
- List of districts in Tamil Nadu by Human Development Index
- Economy of Salem, Tamil Nadu
