= Minnakkal =

Minnakkal மின்னக்கல்
- Village panchayat
- Location in Tamil Nadu, India
- Coordinates: 11°31′55.0″N 78°05′12.9″E
- Country: India
- State: Tamilnadu
- District: Namakkal
- Taluk: Rasipuram
- Block: Vennandur block

Language
  - Official: Tamil
- PIN: 637505
- Area code: +91-4287

Minnakkal is a village in Vennandur Block in Namakkal District of Tamil Nadu State, India.

== Geographical Location ==
It is located 39 km towards North from District headquarters Namakkal, 5 km from Vennandur, 339 km from State capital Chennai. Minnakkal Sappayapuram (2 km), Ponparappipatti (3 km), Nachipatti (3 km), Alavaipatti (5 km), Mamundi Agraharam (5 km) are the nearby Villages to Minnakkal. Minnakkal is surrounded by Veerapandi Block towards North, Panamarathupatti Block towards East, Mallasamudram Block towards South, Macdonalds Choultry Block towards west. Salem, Rasipuram, Tharamangalam, Namagiripettai are the nearby cities to Minnakkal. This place is located on the border of the Namakkal District and Salem district. PIN code of this area is 637505 and postal head office is Vennandur.

== Sub Villages ==
- Vadugampalayam
- Vaikkalpattarai

== Population ==
The total population of this village as per Census 2011, stood at 5,420.

== Language ==
In Minnakkal Tamil is the local language.

== Politics ==
DMK, AIADMK, PMK are the major political parties in this area.

== Transport ==
=== Road ===
There is no Government road transport services. But Minnakkal road bus stop in Vennandur is used by the people to travel to other Villages and cities by public and private transport. Sri Valli mini bus services connect the people from Minnakkal road bus stop in Vennandur to Mallur.

=== Rail ===
Virapandy Road Railway Station, Makudan Virapandi Block Hut Railway Station are the nearby railway stations to Minnakkal. However, Salem Junction Railway Station is major railway station located at distance of 17 km near from Minnakkal.
