= Ponsorimalai =

Sorimalai
- Aerial view of Vennandur block, view of Ponsorimalai and beyond that view of Kanjamalai from Alavaimalai

Highest point
- Coordinates: 11°32′48.9″N 78°06′19.6″E

Dimensions
- Length: 2.575 km (1.600 mi) N–S
- Width: 2.253 km (1.400 mi) E–W
- Area: 5.8 km^{2} (2.2 mi^{2})

Naming
- English translation: Ponsorimalai- பொன்சொரிமலை
- Language of name: Tamil

Geography
- Location: Ponparappipatti
- Parent range: part of the Eastern Ghats

Climbing
- Easiest route: Vennandur-Mallur Road

Ponsorimalai, also known as Sorimalai, is a hill in Vennandur block of Namakkal district in Tamil Nadu, India.

== Geology ==
Ponsorimalai is located northwest of Alavaimalai and southeast of Kanjamalai. North and West side foot hill limits are surrounded by villages of Salem district, South and East side foot hill limits are surrounded by villages of Namakkal district.

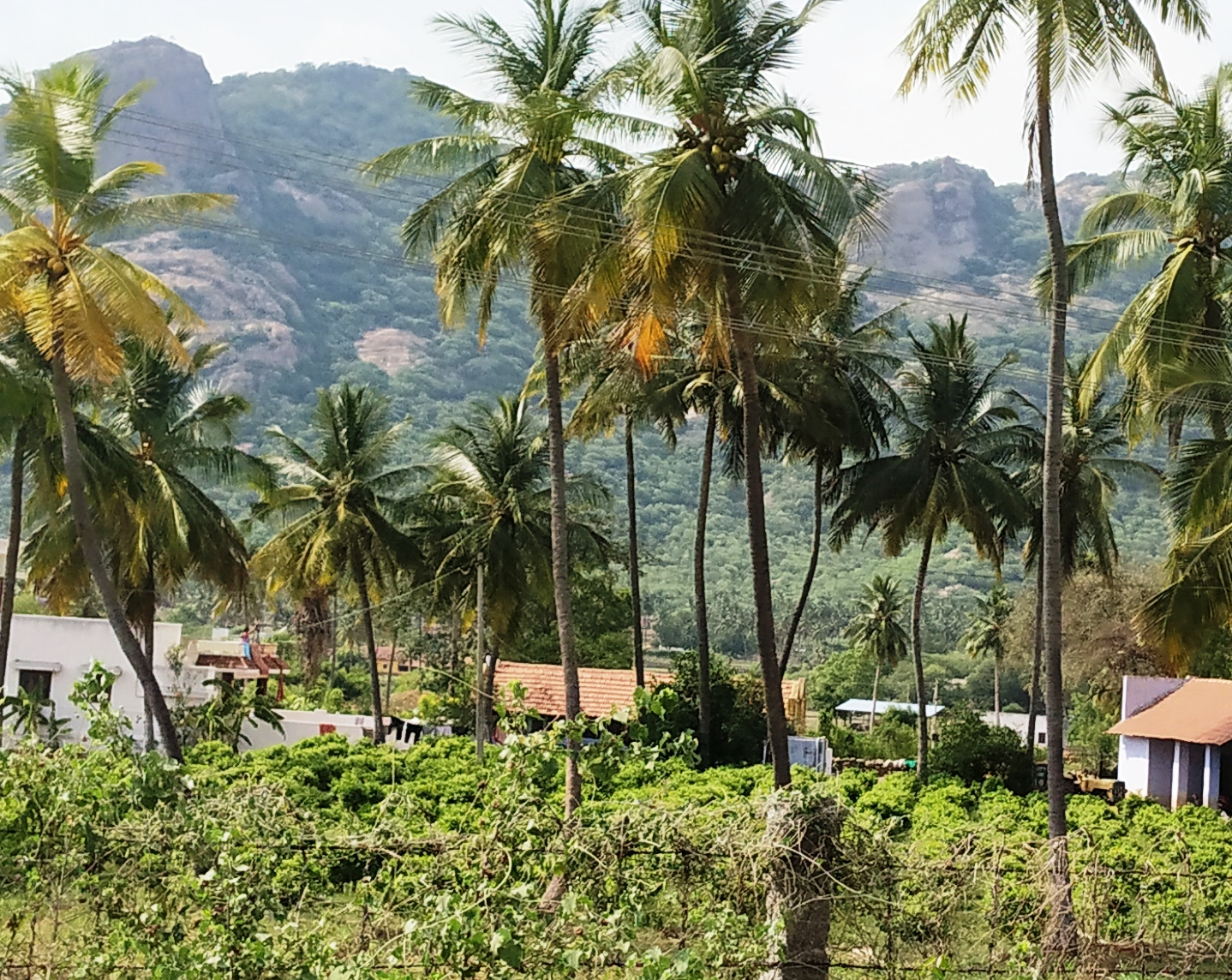
Ponsorimalai

== History ==
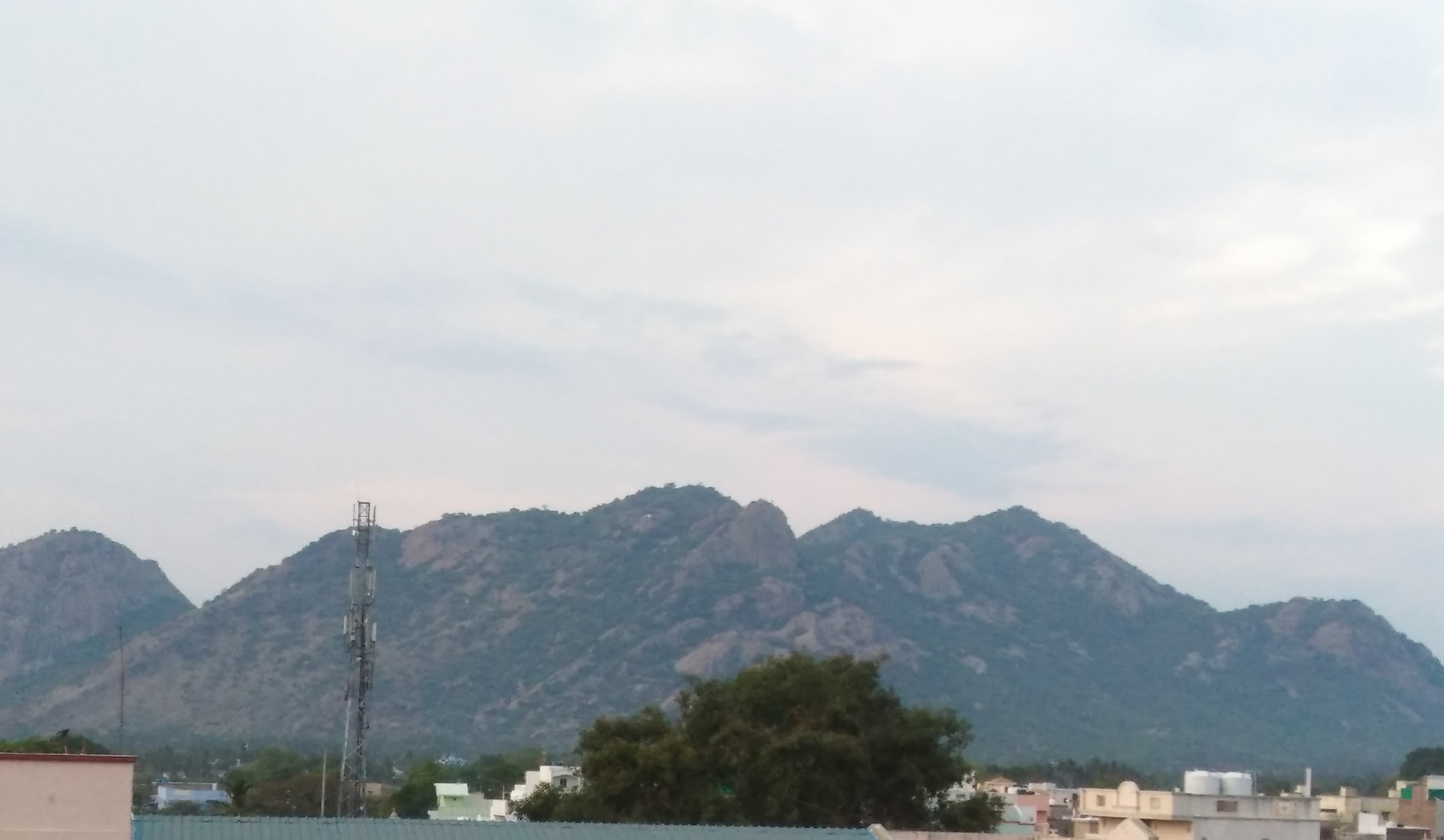
Ponsorimalai from Vennandur

A 15th-century Jain inscriptions in the hills bear couplet 251 from the “Shunning meat” chapter (Chapter 26) of the Kural text, indicating that the people of the Kongu Nadu region practiced ahimsa and non-killing as chief virtues.
