= Economy of Salem, Tamil Nadu =

The economy of Salem, Tamil Nadu is mostly influenced by Information Technology, Steel, Textile industry, Agriculture and more other fields. Salem is mostly known as Steel city and Mangoes city of India. The gross domestic product (GDP) of Salem city is 12,134.10 GDP (IN RS. CR.) and (YOY) is 10.31. It is the third-largest district economy in Tamil Nadu while GDP growth in Chennai GDP (IN RS. CR.) 20,847.32 (1), Coimbatore GDP (IN RS. CR.) 23,371.63 (2), Madurai GDP (IN RS. CR.) 10,401.02 (5), Tiruchirappalli GDP (IN RS. CR.) 10,493.93 (4). Salem has one Special Economic zone over 40 in Tamil Nadu, ELCOT has established an IT Special Economic Zone at Jagirammapalayam village, Salem, in an extent of 53.33 acres of land at an investment of Rs. 40.53 crore. Salem district also have local planning authority called Salem Local Planning Authority for development of Salem City Corporation area and Salem Metropolitan Area. And also for suburbs in Salem district.

== Information technology ==
Salem has been categorized as a tier II city and the Tamil Nadu government has collaborated with ELCOT to fortify IT park sprawling an area of 160 acres. This has the potential to employ bevy of graduates for the progression of the state. Unemployment can be warded off to some extent with the advent of this park.

== Textiles ==
The handloom industry is one of the most ancient cottage industries in Salem district of Tamil Nadu, India. The handloom industry is one of the most ancient cottage industries in Salem district of Tamil Nadu. Next to agriculture hand-loom weaving is considered the most important industry in Tamil Nadu as well as India. In Salem district the chief industry was weaving, which was carried on in almost every large town or village.

Salem was one of the primary handloom centers of south India. Sari, dhoti and angavasthram are made out of silk yarn and cotton yarn. In the recent past, home furnishing items are also woven, mainly for export purposes. More than 75,000 handlooms are working and the total value of cloth produced per annum is estimated at Rs.5,000 crores.

== Steel authority ==
Salem Steel Plant (SSP), a unit of Steel Authority of India Limited (SAIL), is a steel plant involved in the production of stainless steel. It is located along the Salem — Bangalore National Highway 44 in the foothills of Kanjamalai in Salem district, Tamil Nadu, India. The plant has an installed capacity of 70,000 tonnes per annum in its cold rolling mill and 3,64,000 tonnes per annum in the hot rolling mill. It also has the country's first stainless steel blanking facility.

Based on the report of the Italian firm an application for grant of a license under the Industries (Development & Regulation Act, 1951, for the setting up of a plant to manufacture 10,000 metric tons of aluminum ingots has been received from Shn R Venkataswamy Naidu, Coimbatore The Government of Madras have recommended the application

=== Production facilities ===
The major facilities at the plant include

- Steel Melting Shop
- Cold Rolling Mill Complex
- Hot Rolling Mill Complex
- Stainless Steel Blanking Line

SSP specializes in the production of cold rolled stainless steel in the form of coils and sheets. The raw materials are imported and also supplied by Alloy Steel Plant in Durgapur. The steel melting shop's annual capacity is 1,80,000 tonnes of slabs per annum. The hot-rolling mill and cold-rolling mill have capacities of 3,64,000 and 66,600 tonnes per annum respectively.

SSP supplies steel to BHEL-Tiruchirapalli, HMT, Bharat Electronics Limited-Bangalore and Indian Telephone Industries. Stainless steel is also exported to over more than 37 countries including Spain, UK, Japan, Germany and Switzerland. Between 1994 and 1995, around 41,500 tonnes to as many as 27 countries.

== Transport ==
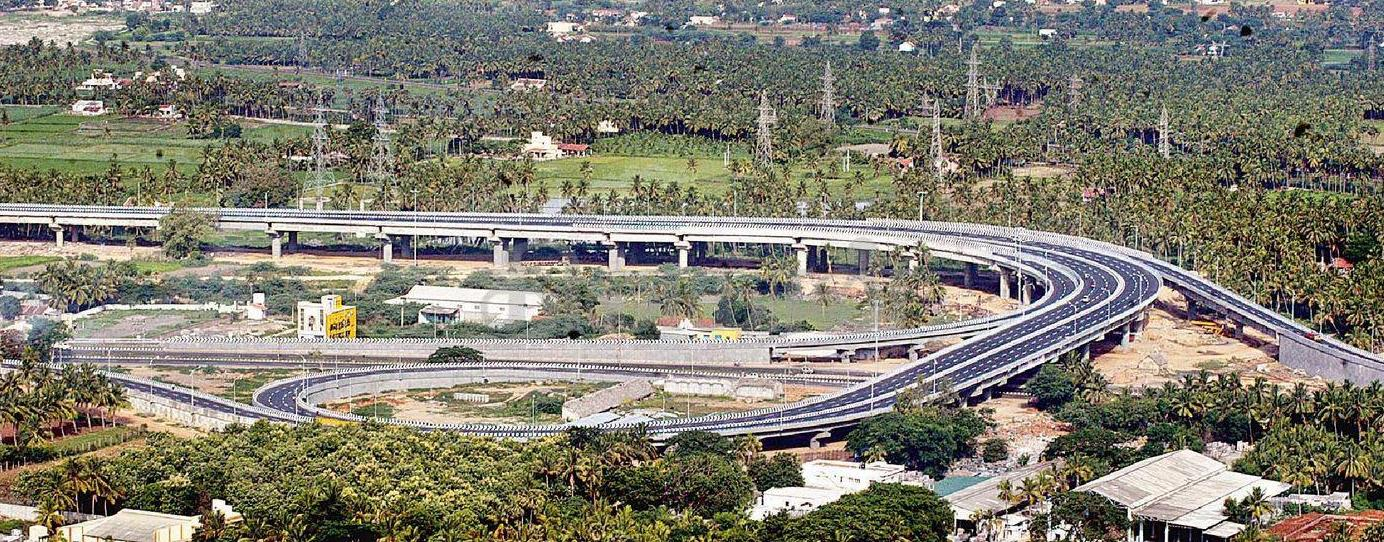
Trumpet Exchange

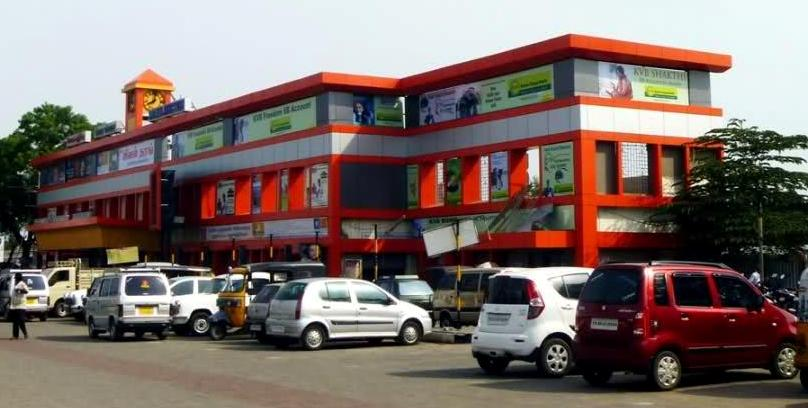
Salem Junction's old Entrance

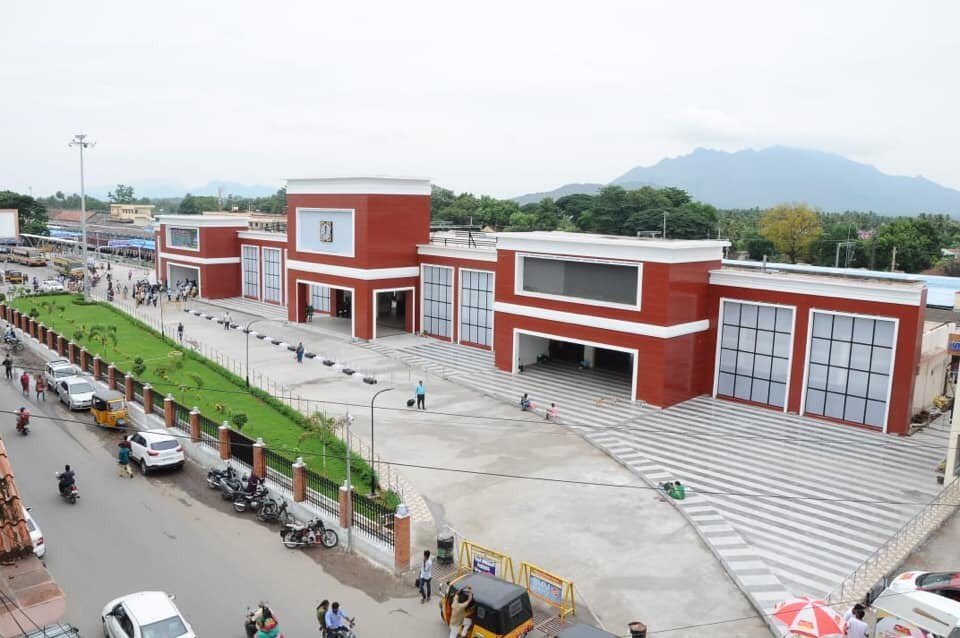
a newly renovated Salem Junction's Entrance

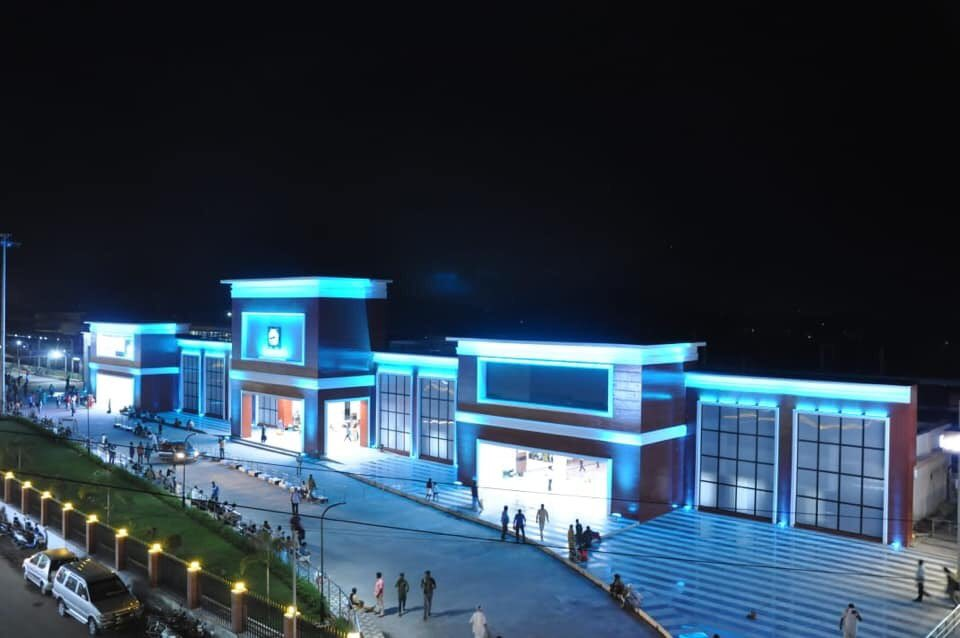
Salem Junction at night

=== Road ===
Salem has six arterial roads: Omalur Road, Cherry Road, Saradha College Road, Junction Main Road, Trichy Road and Attur Road. Three National Highways originate in or pass through: NH 44 (Srinagar via Madurai and Tirunelveli Kanyakumari), NH 544 (Salem – Kochi via Coimbatore )and NH 79 (Salem – Ulundurpet).

Salem is the headquarters of the Salem division of TNSTC. The city has two major bus stations: the MGR Integrated Bus Terminus in Meyyanoor and the Town Bus Station (Old Bus Stand) in the town area. Intercity and interstate routes and private buses originate at the Central Bus Stand(New Bus Stand), and local buses originate at the Old Bus Stand. The Anna Flyover is the oldest in the city, and the Trumpet Interchange was built in the realignment of NH 544 to ease traffic towards Coimbatore. A new double-decker flyover runs within main city centres like New bus stand, 5 roads, saratha college road, 4 roads to ease congestion on these roads. It is the longest double-decker flyover in Tamil Nadu covering a length of 7.87 km.

The Town Bus terminus is being upgraded into a double decker bus terminus, the first of this kind in the state under the smart City scheme. The terminal building of the New Bus terminus is also reconstructed under the smart City scheme.

A new bus port has also been proposed for the city at Jagirammapalayam near IT park with an area of about 61 acres. This includes a bypass road to connect the Ayothiapattinam area of the city with the bus port.

Other bus stands include the Omalur bus station and Attayampatti bus station in the outskirts of the city.

=== Rail ===
Salem Junction is an A-1 category ISO-14001 certified railway junction located in Suramangalam area, 5 kilometres (3.1 mi) west of the city. In 2005, the Railway Board approved the creation of a Salem railway division from Palakkad and Tiruchirapalli divisions. It is the fourth-largest of the six Southern Railway zone divisions. Salem Railway Junction has been rated as the cleanest station among the divisional headquarters railway stations and also the ninth cleanest railway station in the entire country, according to a survey report published in June 2017. Other major railway stations catering to the city include Salem Town, Salem Market, Omalur Junction, Karuppur railway station and Ayothiapattinam railway station.

=== Air ===
Salem Airport (IATA SXV, ICAO VOSM) is located on the Salem-Bengaluru Highway (NH44) in Kaamalapuram about 15 kilometres (9.3 mi) from the city. Airports Authority of India (AAI) opened the airport in 1993 for commercial operations. Kingfisher Airlines flew from Chennai but ended its service in October 2011 due to low occupancy. Trujet started services to Chennai in March 2018 as a part of the Udaan scheme by Government of India as well as Air Odisha gives connectivity to Bengaluru and Pondicherry from June 2018. The nearest major airports are Tiruchirappalli (152 km) and Coimbatore (148 km).

== Education ==
Salem has several educational institutions with Arts and Science colleges affiliated to Periyar University founded in 1997.

- The Government College of Engineering was founded in 1966.
- The Government Mohan Kumaramangalam Medical College was established in 1986.
- The Institute of Handloom Technology (IIHT), Salem was established in 1960 by Ministry of Textiles.
- The Government Law College was opened in August 2019.
- Sona College of Technology founded 1997
- Vinayaka Mission's Kirupananda Variyar Engineering College founded 1987
- Thiagarajar Polytechnic College founded 1958

== Air Force and defence ==
Salem is the principal city to manufacturing defence and aerospace components along with Chennai, Coimbatore and Tiruchirappalli.

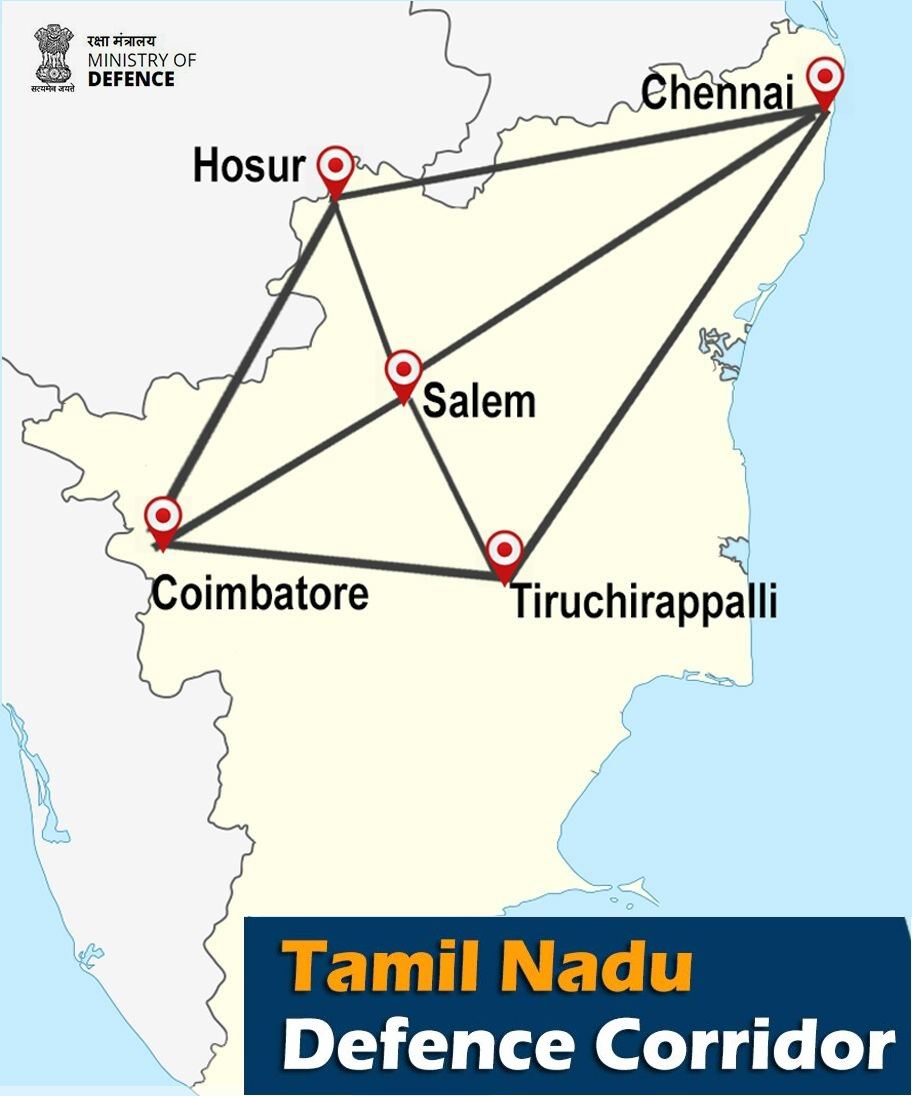
Tamil Nadu Defence Corridor

The company has also planned to build a helicopter assembly factory in Tamil Nadu. Tier - II cities of Coimbatore and Salem also serves as a major export hub for defence manufacturing firms. Defence, paramilitary and police personnel across the nation use guns, ammunitions and bullets manufactured from the city. Special grade steel used in making missiles are manufactured in Salem. India's multinational engineering conglomerate L&T joint venture with France-based MBDA, a world leader in missile systems planned a "L&T MBDA Missile Systems" facility at Aspen SEZ in Coimbatore serves as its hub to export fully assembled missile systems to Europe.

Salem is also serves head for TANEJA Aerospace and Salem Aerospace Limited.

== Hospitality ==
In the recent years, the city has seen growth in the hospitality industry. Several 5 star hotels operate here.

== Retail and e-commerce ==
There are malls, Multiplex and retailing centers in Salem city.. Reliance Mall, DNC ROX Mall are one of its kind in Salem.

== Health and hygiene ==
Salem city has a government multi speciality hospital, and some private multi speciality hospitals.

== Cottage industry ==
With its abundant natural resources, cottage industries are very dynamic sector of Salem, which contribute to the exports. Among the people who cultivate sugarcane in Salem, the production of un-bleached sugar or Nattu Sarkari is a big cottage industry. Rope making from various natural resources such as Jute, coconut and Aloe Vera is another major cottage industry for the people of Salem. With a sizable weaver population, weaving is a major cottage industry in Salem. Throughout the state, the cotton and silk which is woven in Salem is popular among the people and introduced the famous Mecheri breed. This breed is very popular with the people and is reared by them main for meat. Also, Salem is famous for its handmade silver ornaments and artifacts which are sold all over the country.

== Agriculture ==
The fifth largest city of the state is connected from all sides by road, trains and airport. Also, it works as the junction for the agro products which are produced in nearby areas. Leigh Bazaar is one of the largest bazaars for trading and export of the Agro products. In the Agriculture part, Salem plays a major role in manufacturing of Sago.

== Manufacturing ==
Salem has a large and a diversified manufacturing sector facilitated by the presence of MSB electronic industry, Samvi Habitota, Pragathi textiles, Sri Manohari chemicals, Leo poly products, Talema electronics, Sri velan ice factory, AMS battery industry, RA dyeing, Logu electronics, Talema electronics, Jai Kumar pipe industry, Annai Taurpalins and company, Vetri polymers, Senthil enterprises, Photonics, Sankar Engineering Trailering, Venus PPV Spinning Mills Private Limited, Sri Venkateshwara weldings, system control are the major manufacturer in Salem.

== Paper industry ==
Pandiyan paper company and other private companies has a manufacturing facility in Salem for Paperboards & Speciality Paper division.

== Electricity generation ==
The Mettur Thermal Power Station is a coal-fired electric power station located in [Thoppur-Mettur Dam-Bhavani-Erode Rd, Mettur, Tamil Nadu 636406] Salem district of Tamil Nadu. It is operated by Tamil Nadu Power Generation Corporation Limited. The power station was commissioned during various periods from 1987 and this is the first inland thermal Power Station of TNPGCL.The coal from Mahanadi Coalfields Limited (Talcher and Ib Valley) and Eastern Coalfields Limited (Raniganj and Mugma) are transported to the load ports of Paradip (Orissa), Vizag (Andhra Pradesh) and Haldia (West Bengal). Thereafter the coal is transported to the discharge ports of Ennore and Tuticorin by ships. From Ennore Port the coal is transported again through rail to Ennore Thermal Power Station and Mettur Thermal Power Station.

BGR Energy Systems Ltd was the EPC contractor for 600 MW unit 5 of the power plant.

== Magnesite ==
Tamil Nadu Magnesite Limited (TANMAG) (Tamil: தமிழ் நாடு வெள்ளைக்கல் நிறுவனம்) is a state-government undertaking of Government of Tamil Nadu located in the Indian state of Tamil Nadu. It is mining & processing magnesite minerals in Salem Region.

Government of Tamil Nadu formed TAMILNADU MAGNESITE LIMITED, popularly known as TANMAG in January 1979. Company produce Dead Burnt Magnesite, Lightly Calcined Magnesite from raw Magnesite.

Company own captive mine and two factories to produce DBM and LCM of various grades.

== Sports and health fitness ==
=== Sports ===
Sports are the main entertainment and important field in Salem city . Salem has more sports related stationaries and shops, Salem city host many tournaments like Tamil Nadu Premier League and U19 National level tournament in different venues like Salem Cricket Foundation Stadium, Mahatma Gandhi stadium and SRP International Stadium etc.

Also some zonal level tournament's are held in Salem in different venues, Mahatma Gandhi stadium host Ranjhi Trophy.

== See also ==
- Economy of Tamil Nadu
- Economy of Chennai
- Economy of Coimbatore
- Salem metropolitan area (India)
- Local Bodies in Salem
