= Elcot =

Elcot may refer to:

- Elcot, Berkshire, a hamlet in England
- Electronics Corporation of Tamil Nadu, state-owned corporation of the Indian state of Tamil Nadu
  - ELCOT IT Park, Salem, tech park in Salem, Tamil Nadu, India
  - ELCOT IT Park Trichy, tech park in Trichy, Tamil Nadu, India
