= Alavaipatti =

- Village panchayat
- Location in Tamil Nadu, India
- Coordinates: 11°29′46.6″N 78°05′56.5″E
- Country: India
- State: Tamil Nadu
- District: Namakkal
- Taluk: Rasipuram
- Union: Vennandur union
- Founded by: Alavaipatti people

Government
  - Type: Village panchayat
  - Body: Alavaipatti Village panchayat
  - Chief Minister: M.K Stalin
  - Namakkal M.P.: A. K. P. Chinnaraj

Population
  - Total
- Demonym: Indian

Languages
  - Official: Tamil (தமிழ்)
- Time zone: UTC+5:30 (IST)
- PIN: 637505
- Area code: 91-4287
- Vehicle registration: TN-28 Z

Alavaipatti is a village panchayat located in the Namakkal district of Tamil Nadu state, India.

== Alavaimalai ==
Alavaiptti name is derived from Alavaimalai A temple to lord Murugan is located halfway up the hill, so the hill name is arai (half) vazhi (way) malai (hill), or Alavaimalai. அலவாய்மலையின் பழைய பெயர் உலைவாய்மலை

== Geography ==
Alavaipatti is located 34 km towards North from District headquarters Namakkal, 2 km from Vennandur, and 340 km from the State capital Chennai. Other nearby villages include Palanthinnipatti (1 km), Semmandapatti (2 km), Vennandur (2 km), Nachipatti (4 km) and Alampatti (4 km). Alavaipatti is surrounded by Mallasamudram Union to the west, Veerapandi and Panamarathupatti Union to the North, Namagripet Union to the East and Rasipuram Union to the South.

=== Sub Villages in Alavaipatti ===
- Vellapillaiyar Koil
- Thatchenkadu
- Andivalasu
