= Alavaimalai Subrayar Murugan Temple =

Sri Alavaimalai Subrayar Murugan Temple
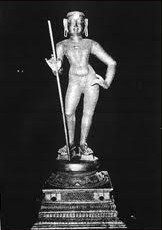

- Location in Tamil Nadu, India

Religion
- Affiliation: Hinduism
- District: Namakkal district
- Deity: Murugan

Location
- Location: Alavaimalai, Alavaipatti, Vennandur block
- State: Tamil Nadu
- Country: India
- Interactive map of Sri Alavaimalai Subrayar Murugan Temple
- Coordinates: 11°28′22.0″N 78°06′53.9″E

Architecture
- Type: Dravidian architecture
- Elevation: 500 m (1,640 ft)

Sri Alavaimalai Subrayar Murugan Temple is a state temple in Tamil Nadu. It is located in mid way of Alavaimalai in Vennandur block.
