= SXT =

SXT may refer to:

- Soft X-ray transient or X-ray nova
- soft X-ray telescope, a telescope that views soft X-rays
  - an instrument on the Yohkoh (SOLAR-A) space probe
  - an instrument on the Astrosat space probe
  - an instrument on the Hitomi (ASTRO-H) space probe
- Saxitoxin
- Co-trimoxazole
- SXT Technology Solutions, a European telecommunications company
- the ICAO airline code for Servicios De Taxi Aéreo, see Airline codes-S
- the rail code for Salem Town railway station
- the NYSE stock ticker symbol for Sensient Technologies Corporation
- the sign extend operation for the PDP-11 architecture
- SXT the former trim model for a Dodge Grand Caravan.
