= No 3 Komarapalayam =

No 3 Komarapalayam நெ 3 கொமாரபாளையம்
- Village panchayat
- Location in Tamil Nadu, India
- Coordinates: 11°32′21.8″N 78°08′02.2″E
- Country: India
- State: Tamilnadu
- District: Namakkal
- Taluk: Rasipuram
- Block: Vennandur block

Language
  - Official: Tamil
- PIN: 636203
- Area code: +91-4287

No 3 Komarapalayam is a village panchayat in Vennandur block.

== Geographic ==
No 3 Komarapalayam is a village in Vennandur Block in Namakkal District of Tamil Nadu State, India. It is located 34 km towards North from District headquarters Namakkal. 340 km from State capital Chennai.This Place is in the border of the Namakkal District and Salem District. Salem District Veerapandi is North towards this place .

== Sub villages ==
- Komarapalayam
- Keeranur, Vennandur
- Annamalaipatty Kombaikadu
- Gandhi Nagar
- Vasantham Nagar
- Karattu Valavu
- Molagoundan Valasu
- Gundu Perumal Kovil Karadu
- Kasalar Kuttai

== Places ==
- Periyamariyamman kovil
- Chinnamariyamman kovil
- Shri Varalakshmi Company

== Education ==
- Government Middle School,
- Government Higher Secondary School, Mallur.
- Vetri Vikaas Boys HSS, Keeranur
- Vetri Vikaas Girls HSS, Keeranur

== Transport ==
=== Roadway ===
Only few buses are running to and fro between Vennandur and Salem old bus stand via No 3 Komarapalayam.

- Senthil Bus No:33
- SRN Bus No:33
- TNSRTC No:53/33

=== Railway ===
Nearest railway station is Mallur railway station, 2 km from here.
