= Salem station =

Salem station may refer to:

- Salem station (MBTA), a rail station in Massachusetts, US
- South Salem station, a proposed rail station in Massachusetts, US
- Salem station (Oregon), a rail station in Oregon, US
- Salem Junction railway station, a rail station in Tamil Nadu, India
- Salem Town railway station, a rail station in Tamil Nadu, India
