= Alavaimalai =

Azhavaimalai
- Aerial view of Vennandur block, view of Ponsorimalai and beyond that view of Kanjamalai from Azhavaimalai

Highest point
- Elevation: 937 m (3,074 ft)
- Coordinates: 11°28′10.7″N 78°07′10.3″E

Dimensions
- Length: 6.437 km (4.000 mi) N–S
- Width: 4.828 km (3.000 mi) E–W
- Area: 31.08009 km^{2} (12.00009 mi^{2})

Naming
- Native name: அழவாய்மலை (Tamil)
- English translation: Half Way Hill(அழவாய்மலை)

Geography
- Location: Vennandur block, Athanur
- Parent range: which is part of the Eastern Ghats
- Biome: Forests

Climbing
- Easiest route: MDR-46-Namakkal, Steps to Temple from foot hill in Azhavaipatti.

Azhavaimalai (Tamil: அழவாய்மலை) is a hill in Vennandur block, Namakkal district, Tamil Nadu state, India.

== Azhavaimalai's Geographical Context and Regional Characteristics ==
Azhavaimalai, a prominent hill, is an integral part of the Eastern Ghats, an ancient mountain range running along India's eastern coast. This hill is strategically located within the Vennandur block of Tamil Nadu's Namakkal district, serving as a notable geographical landmark in the region.

The area surrounding Azhavaimalai is dotted with several key settlements, each positioned distinctly in relation to the hill:

To the west of Azhavaimalai lies Vennandur, the block headquarters. Athanur is situated to the north. To the south, you'll find Vaiyappamalai. And to the east, lies the larger town of Rasipuram.

This positioning highlights Azhavaimalai's central role within this network of towns and villages in the Namakkal district.

Climate and Rainfall

The Namakkal district, including the Azhavaimalai region, generally experiences a tropical savanna climate. It is characterized by hot and dry summers, followed by a monsoon season, and relatively mild winters.

Temperature: Average temperatures in the district range from a comfortable 20 °C (68 °F) to a hot 40 °C (104 °F), with summer months (March to May) being the warmest. Winters (October to February) are pleasant, with temperatures typically between 20 °C and 30 °C, occasionally dropping to around 15 °C in December and January.

Rainfall: The average annual rainfall for the Namakkal district is around 716.54 mm. The region primarily receives rainfall from the \ Northeast Monsoon (October to December), which brings moderate to heavy showers, providing much-needed relief from the summer heat. Some rainfall also occurs during the Southwest Monsoon (June to September).

Vegetation and Forests

While Azhavaimalai itself might feature sparse vegetation on its rocky slopes, the broader Namakkal district has a notable forest cover, accounting for approximately 15% of its total geographical area (around 512.5 sq. km). These forests are generally dry deciduous and thorn forests, characteristic of semi-arid regions. The Kolli Hills, another part of the Eastern Ghats within the district, are known for their richer biodiversity and medicinal plant wealth. The vegetation in the immediate vicinity of Azhavaimalai would likely consist of drought-resistant shrubs, grasses, and scattered trees adapted to the local rocky and less fertile terrain.

Agriculture and Land Use

Agriculture remains the primary occupation for a significant portion of the population in the Namakkal district. The cultivation generally depends on monsoon rains, wells, and tanks for irrigation. The major soil type found in the district is red soil, accounting for about 77% of the area.

Key agricultural practices and crops include:

Major Food Crops: Paddy (rice), cholam (sorghum), cumbu (pearl millet), and ragi are the principal cereal crops. Various millets like Panivaragu, Kuthiraivali, Samai Varagu, and Thinai are also cultivated, especially in rainfed areas.

Pulses and Oilseeds: Redgram, blackgram, greengram, and horsegram are major pulse crops. Groundnut, castor, and gingelly (sesame) are important oilseed crops.

Commercial Crops: Sugarcane, cotton, and tapioca are significant commercial crops. Namakkal district is particularly known for its extensive tapioca cultivation, which supports a large number of starch and sago manufacturing units.

Irrigation: While monsoon rains are crucial, irrigation through canals (like Mettur East Bank canal), tanks, tube wells, and open wells supports agricultural activities, especially for water-intensive crops.

Livestock: Beyond crop cultivation, Namakkal district is also famously known as "Egg City" and a "Transport Hub," indicating a significant poultry industry and related economic activities that complement the agricultural sector.

== Geology ==
Azhavaimalai, a prominent hill in the Namakkal district of Tamil Nadu, likely derives its name from "Azha Vaai Malai" (ஆழ வாய் மலை), meaning "deep-rooted hill." This name aptly reflects its geological origin: Azhavaimalai is underlain by an Archaean crystalline and metamorphic rock complex that has been significantly intruded by various plutonic igneous bodies.

These intrusions are a result of the region's complex geological history, marked by recurring tectonic and magmatic activity during the Precambrian period. Evidence of this igneous activity includes prominent dolerite dykes, ultramafic rocks (such as dunites and peridotites), granites, and syenites found within the broader area encompassing Azavaimalai. These deep-seated intrusions confirm the hill's connection to extensive past igneous processes.

== Mythology ==
The Alavaimalai Subrayar Murugan Temple is located halfway up the hill, with its entrance facing west. According to mythology, Lord Murugan is believed to have originated from Lord Shiva's third eye, a source of intense heat and radiation. Coinciding with this mythological origin, the presence of the Lord Murugan temple on Azhavaimalai could be seen to metaphorically reflect the hill's own geological origin from a source of intense heat, such as igneous lava or deep-seated intrusions.

== Important Places in and Around Azhavaimalai ==
Azhavaimalai, while a significant local landmark, is part of a larger region in Namakkal district with various important places. Here's a list covering government establishments, temples, and other places of public interest in and around Azhavaimalai, extending to the surrounding towns and the wider Namakkal district for a comprehensive view:

Temples and Spiritual Sites

Azhavaimalai Subrayar Murugan Temple: Located halfway up Azhavaimalai itself, this is the most prominent religious site directly associated with the hill.

Azhavaymalai Karupannar Temple: Another temple specifically located near Azhavaimalai, indicating local spiritual significance.

Temples in Vaiyappamalai (South of Azhavaimalai): Vaiyappamalai is known for several temples, including:

1. Sri Balasubramaniyam Temple
2. Murugan Temple
3. Konganar Sidhar Cave (a spiritual cave)
4. Sri Kandaswamy Temple
5. Namperumal Temple

Temples in Vennandur (West of Azhavaimalai): The Vennandur block itself hosts a number of temples:

1. Sri Veeramaathi Amman Temple
2. Agaralingeswarar Temple
3. Sri Mahamariamman Madurai Veeran Koil
4. Kolankandai Seli Amman Temple

Prominent Temples in Namakkal District (Wider Area):

1. Namakkal Anjaneyar Temple: A famous 18-foot tall idol carved out of a single rock, with an open roof.
2. Namakkal Narasimha Swamy Temple: An ancient cave temple carved into the rock, dedicated to Lord Narasimha.
3. Ardhanareeswarar Temple, Tiruchengode: A very significant temple dedicated to Lord Shiva as Ardhanareeswarar (half male, half female), located on a hill.
4. Koolippatti Murugan Temple: Another notable Murugan temple in the district.
5. Arapaleeswarar Temple, Kolli Hills: An ancient Shiva temple located in the nearby Kolli Hills, popular for pilgrims.

== Government Establishments ==
Government establishments are typically found in the larger administrative centers. For the Azhavaimalai area, this primarily means Vennandur and Rasipuram. The District Headquarters, Namakkal, houses major district-level offices.

Within Vennandur Block/Nearby:

1. Vennandur Town Panchayat Office: The local administrative body for Vennandur.
2. Post Offices: Found in nearby villages like Gurusamipalayam and Pudupatti.
3. Sub-Registrar Office: Available in Rasipuram for land and property registrations.
4. Village Administrative Offices (VAO Office): Local revenue administration offices in surrounding villages.
5. Block Development Officer (BDO) Office: The BDO office for Vennandur block would be a key rural development establishment.
