= Mathiyampatti =

- Village panchayat
- Location in Tamil Nadu, India
- Coordinates: 11°29′45.4″N 78°03′11.9″E
- Country: India
- State: Tamilnadu
- District: Namakkal
- Taluk: Rasipuram
- Block: Vennandur block

Language
  - Official: Tamil
- PIN: 637505
- Area code: +91-4287

Mathiyampatti is a village panchayat in Vennandur Union of Namakkal District. Mathiyam patti is 6 km (3.7 mi) southwest from Vennandur.

== Sub villages ==
- Mathiyampatti
- Sowripalayam
- Kattipalayam

== Important places ==
- St. Mary Magdalene Church is located at Sowripalayam is a sub village of Mathiyampatti.
- Kattipalayam lake are located in this sub village for fish and water sores of agriculture.
- Mathiyampatti Lake are located in this sub village for fish and water sores of agriculture.
