= Lake Vennandur =

Lake in Tamil Nadu, India

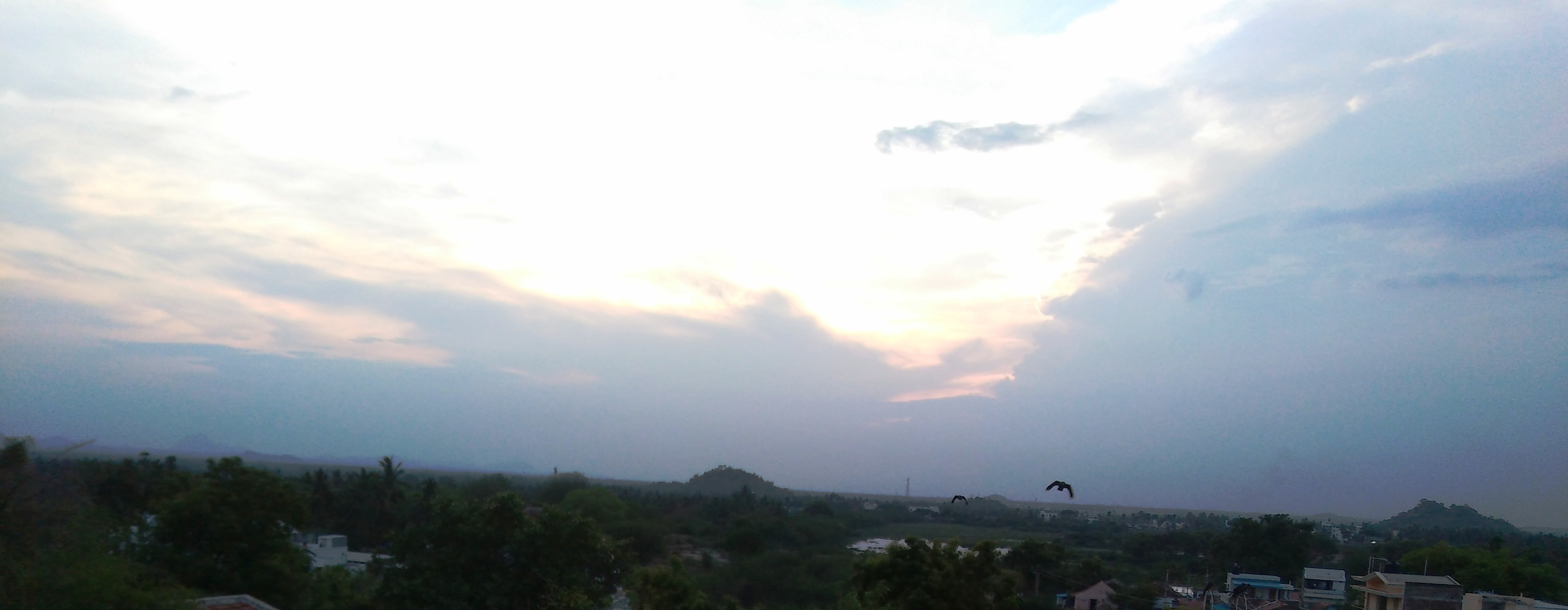

- Location within Tamil Nadu
- Location: Vennandur Tamilnadu
- Coordinates: 11°31′01.6″N 78°05′04.3″E
- Primary inflows: Thirumanimutharu river
- Primary outflows: Drain at South bank of The lake
- Basin countries: India
- Surface area: 0.311 km^{2} (0.120 sq mi)
- Settlements: Vennandur, Nachipatti

Lake Vennandur is located at west near to Vennandur. North side Lakeshore, South side Lakeshore and East side Lakeshore of lake are located in Vennandur. West side Lakeshore is located in Nachipatti. North and South side Lakeshore length are more than East and West side Lakeshore length.
