= ELCOT IT Park Trichy =

Tech Park in Trichy, India

ELCOT IT Park, Trichy
- Interactive map of the ELCOT IT Park, Trichy area

General information
- Type: Information Technology Park
- Location: ELCOT SEZ, Navalpattu, Tiruchirappalli-620006, Tamil Nadu, India
- Coordinates: 10.735314°N 78.766194°E
- Construction started: 21, October 2009
- Completed: 2010
- Inaugurated: 9, December 2010
- Cost: ₹60.08 crore (US$6.2 million)
- Owner: ELCOT

Technical details
- Floor count: 2
- Floor area: 59,960 sq ft (5,570 m^{2})
- Lifts/elevators: 5 (1 service Lift)
- Grounds: 2 acres (8,100 m^{2})

Design and construction
- Main contractor: MARG Limited

ELCOT IT Park Trichy is an information technology (IT) park in the city of Tiruchirappalli, India. It was set up in 2010 as part of an effort to foster the growth of information technology in various cities of Tamil Nadu by Electronics Corporation of Tamil Nadu (ELCOT).

== Location ==
ELCOT IT Park Trichy is located on 2 acres of land at ELCOT SEZ in Navalpattu which is 15 kilometres (9.3 mi) from Tiruchirappalli Junction railway station and 9 kilometres (5.6 mi) from Tiruchirappalli International Airport. The IT Park is connected to the Trichy-Pudukottai NH-336 by a 4.7 kilometres (2.9 mi) long 4-lane road laid at a cost of ₹6.1 crore (US$630,000).

== ELCOT IT Building ==
The ELCOT IT Building, situated on two acres of land, was built by MARG Limited at the cost of ₹60 crore (US$6.2 million). It is a 2-storey building with total floor capacity of 59,960 sq ft (5,570 m^{2}). The building offers complete power backup, a communication network, general maintenance, access control, fire safety, and ample parking space. Currently the entire floor space is occupied by various companies including, Vuram, V.Dart Technologies, GI Tech Gaming, and more, where 1535 employees are working, as listed below.

ELCOT IT building space allotment
Name of Company	Space Allotted (sq. ft.)
M/s. i Link Systems Pvt. Ltd.,	6668
M/s. Scientific Publishing Company	30250
M/s Vuram Technology Solutions Pvt. Ltd.	5976
M/s Vdart Technologies	3643
Tamil Nadu Disaster Recovery Centre	5963
M/s. GI Tech Gaming co.India Pvt.Ltd.	4919
M.s. VR Della IT Services P.Ltd.	2541

== ELCOT IT Park ==
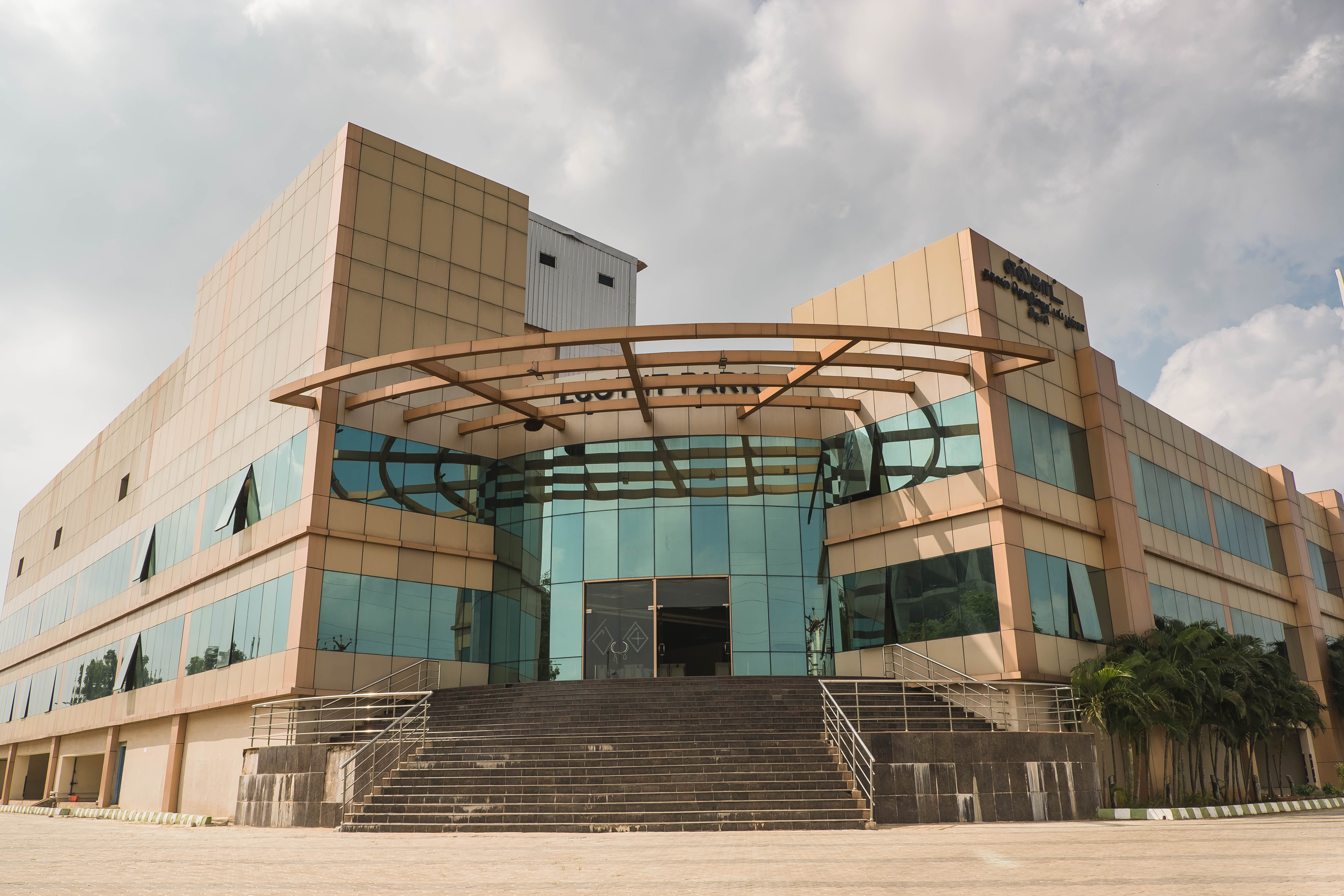
ELCOT IT Park

The IT Park comprises total land of 147.61 acres (597,400 m^{2}). Out of which 123.23 acres (498,700 m^{2}) falls under Special Economic Zone and the rest 24.28 acres (98,300 m^{2}) are non-SEZ lands. Approval for SEZ is effective from 26 July 2007. The TNEB has been provided with 10 acres of land to set up a 110 kV substation.

ELCOT Land allotment
Name of Company	Land Allotted (acres)
M/s. Sutherland	10
M/s. WNS Global Services (p) Ltd.	5
M/s. Zylog Systems Limited	5
M/s. Unlimited Innovations India Pvt. Ltd.	5
M/s. Assyst International Pvt. Ltd	3
M/s. I Link Multitech Solutions Pvt Ltd.	2
M/s. HCL Infosystems Ltd.	2 (Non-SEZ)
M/s. Vdart Technologies.	2
M/s. M/s. Health Plan Systems (India) Pvt. Ltd.	2

== Expansion ==
Due to an overwhelming response and requests from various stakeholders for more building space since the existing one has been completely occupied, Tamil Nadu Government has decided to construct one more IT Building next to the existing one. Tenders for the construction were called by Public Works Department during August 2020 at a cost of ₹42.26 crore (US$4.4 million). The new building will be a 4-storey building with total floor space of 113,000 sq ft (10,500 m^{2}), of which 62,000 sq ft (5,800 m^{2}) is office space. The civil work was started in December 2020 and is estimated to be completed in 18 months.

== See also ==
- ELCOT IT Park, Salem
