= Mathiyampatti Lake =

Lake in Tamil Nadu, India

- Location within Tamil Nadu
- Location: Mathiyampatti, Namakkal district, Tamilnadu
- Coordinates: 11°29′40.3″N 78°03′21.4″E
- Primary inflows: Thirumanimutharu river
- Basin countries: India
- Surface area: 0.1 km^{2} (0.039 sq mi)
- Settlements: Mathiyampatti

Mathiyampatti Lake is located northeast of Mathiyampatti village of Vennandur block in Namakkl district of Tamil Nadu, India.
