= Akkaraipatti =

Akkaraipatti அக்கரைப்பட்டி
- Village panchayat
- Location in Tamil Nadu, India
- Coordinates: 11°28′14.3″N 78°03′42.8″E
- Country: India
- State: Tamilnadu
- District: Namakkal
- Taluk: Rasipuram
- Block: Vennandur block

Language
  - Official: Tamil
- PIN: 637503
- Area code: +91-4287

Akkaraipatti is a village panchayat in Vennandur block of Namakkal District in Tamil Nadu.
