= Anandagoundampalayam =

Anandagoundampalayam அனந்தகவுண்டம்பாளையம்
- Village panchayat
- Location in Tamil Nadu, India
- Coordinates: 11°31′19.6″N 78°06′14.1″E
- Country: India
- State: Tamilnadu
- District: Namakkal
- Taluk: Rasipuram
- Block: Vennandur block

Language
  - Official: Tamil
- PIN: 637505
- Area code: +91-4287

Anandagoundampalayam is a village located in Vennandur block.
