= Keeranur, Vennandur =

Keeranur
- Small Village
- Location in Tamil Nadu, India
- Coordinates: 11°32′02.3″N 78°08′36.2″E
- Country: India
- State: Tamilnadu
- District: Namakkal
- Taluk: Rasipuram
- Block: Vennandur block

Language
  - Official: Tamil
- PIN: 636203
- Area code: +91-4287

Keeranur is a sub village of No 3 Komarapalayam in Vennandur revenue block in Namakkal district of Tamil Nadu.

== Places ==
- TNEB
- Vetri Vikaas Boys Higher Secondary School
- Vetri Vikaas Girls Higher Secondary School
