= ELCOT IT Park, Salem =

IT Park in Salem, India

- Interactive map of the ELCOT IT Park, Salem area

General information
- Type: Information Technology Park
- Location: ELCOT SEZ, Jagirammapalayam, Salem-636012, Tamil Nadu, India
- Coordinates: 11.700595°N 78.105595°E
- Inaugurated: 2007
- Cost: ₹40.53 crore (US$4.2 million)
- Owner: ELCOT

Technical details
- Floor count: G+2
- Floor area: 62,174 sq ft (5,776.2 m^{2})
- Lifts/elevators: 5 (1 service Lift)
- Grounds: 53.33 acres (215,800 m^{2})

ELCOT IT Park Salem is an information technology (IT) park in the city of Salem, India. It was set up in 2010 as part of an effort to foster the growth of information technology in various cities of Tamil Nadu by Electronics Corporation of Tamil Nadu (ELCOT).

== Location ==
Salem ELCOT IT park is located in Jagirammapalayam, in Salem - Bengaluru NH-44. IT park is spreads over in 53.33 acres, where administrative building is constructed in 62,174 sqft area. ELCOT SEZ is located 4.9 km away from Salem Junction, 14 km away from Salem Airport.

== Land Allotment ==
The IT Park comprises total land of 53.33 acres (215,800 m2). Approval for SEZ is effective from 26 July 2007. The TNEB has been provided with 7.88 acres of land to set up a 110 kV substation.

ELCOT Land allotment
Name of Company	Land Allotted (acres)
M/s. Vee Technologies	9.49
M/s. Mahima Technologies Pvt Ltd	5.5
M/s. GTP Infotech Solutions Ltd	2.5
M/s. Senovate Infotech Pvt Ltd	1.25
M/s. TNEB	7.88
M/s. e-Mudhra ltd	2.5
M/s. Anmol Technologies Pvt Ltd	1
M/s. Vdart Technologies.	2
M/s. Nuratech Consultancy Pvt Ltd	6.87
M/s. NoblQ Pvt Ltd	2.5
M/s. FocusR Consultancy and Technologies Pvt Ltd	1
M/s. Sundarsons (India) exports	2.64

== Phase II ==
TamilNadu government initially allotted 164.26 acres of land in Salem - Bengaluru NH in Jagirammapalayam for ELCOT SEZ IT park. But ELCOT tooks only 53.33 acres of land for first phase of Salem ELCOT IT Park, ELCOT handed over remaining lands to government. In Phase - II, ELCOT planned to develop IT infrastructure in remaining area of 164.26 acres just next to the phase - 1 project area.

== See also ==
- Economy of Salem, Tamil Nadu
- ELCOT IT Park Trichy
