= O Sowthapuram =

O Sowthapuram ஓ சௌதாபுரம்
- Village panchayat
- Location in Tamil Nadu, India
- Coordinates: 11°28′16.9″N 78°05′40.6″E
- Country: India
- State: Tamilnadu
- District: Namakkal
- Taluk: Rasipuram
- Block: Vennandur block

Language
  - Official: Tamil
- PIN: 637505
- Area code: +91-4287

O Sowthapuram is a village panchayat in Vennandur block of Namakkal District in Tamilnadu.

== Health ==
- Primary Health Center

== Transport ==
=== Road ===
Connect Salem city and villages in Vennandur block with O Sowthapuram by TNSTC bus service No:51.
