= Shiva Texyarn Limited =

Indian textile manufacturing company

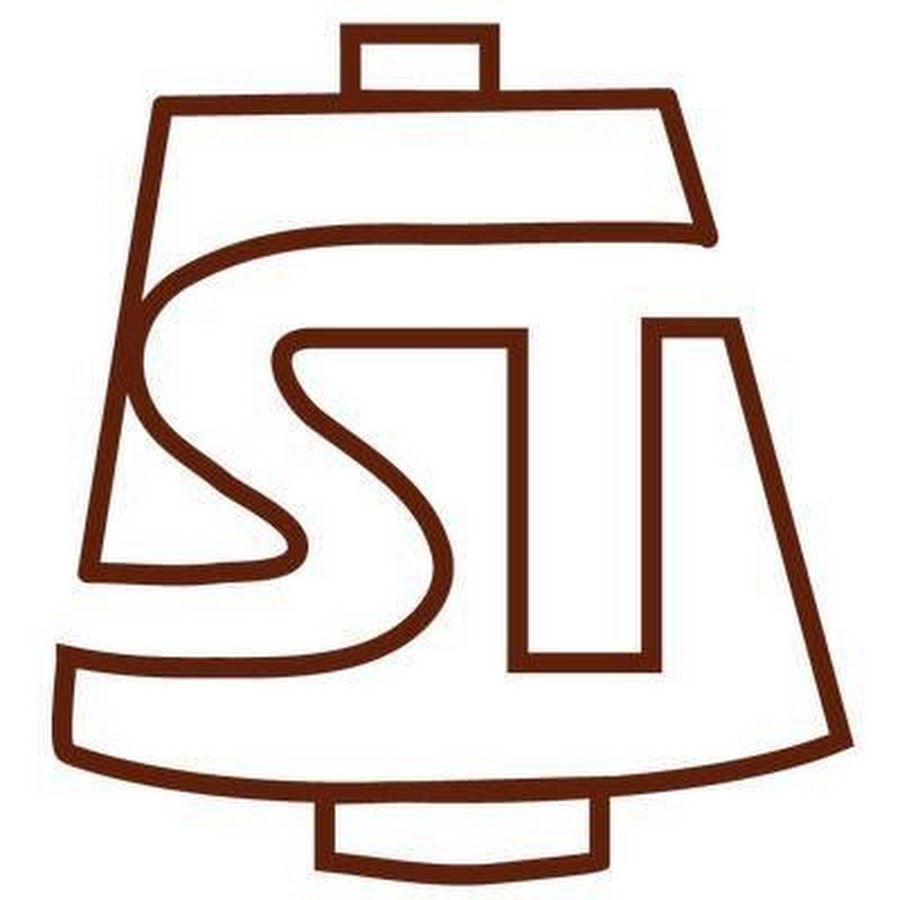
- Company type: public company
- Traded as: BSE: 511108; NSE: SHIVATEX
- Industry: Textile
- Founded: 1980
- Headquarters: Coimbatore, TN, IN
- Key people: S.V. Alagappan (chairman); S.K. Sundararaman (managing director)
- Revenue: ▲₹ 5,000 million
- Website: www.shivatex.in

Shiva Texyarn Limited (BSE: 511108, NSE: SHIVATEX) (formerly known as Annamallai Finance Limited (AFL)) is an Indian textile manufacturing company based in Coimbatore, Tamil Nadu. The company manufactures yarn, fabrics, garments, dry sheets and home textiles in India.

== History ==
Shiva Texyarn was incorporated in March 2002. S.K. Sundararaman is the managing director of the company.

Shiva Texyarn was originally known as Annamallai Finance (AFL) and became a public limited company in 1986. Annamalai Finance Private Limited was established on 28 May 1980, and later became a public company on 25 November 1985. The name of the company changed to Shiva Textyarn Limited from the previous name of Annamalai Finance Ltd in October 2002.

Shiva Texyarn is listed on the Bombay Stock Exchange (BSE: 511108) and the National Stock Exchange of India (NSE: SHIVATEX). The company is an associate of Bannari Amman Group and Bannari Amman Spinning Mills which is one of the largest textile groups in India. The company is 75% owned by shareholders connected to the group so the publicly floated stock is small.

== Recognition ==
- Quality Circle Forum of India JUSE 5S Certified
- OEKO Tex Standard Certification
- WRAP Certification
- Global Organic Textile Standard (GOTS) Certificate

== See also ==
- Textile industry in India
- Ministry of Textiles
- Alok Industries
- Parvathy Mills Limited
