= Kirtilals =

- Industry: Jewellery
- Founded: 1939; 86 years ago in Coimbatore, Tamil Nadu, India
- Headquarters: Coimbatore, India
- Products: Earrings, rings, necklaces, pendants, bracelets, bangles
- Number of employees: 1000
- Website: kirtilals.com

Kirtilals is a diamond jewellery retailer with a large presence in South Indian cities.

== History ==
The first store was founded in 1939 on Raja Street in Coimbatore. They added online ordering on their website in 2017.

== Locations ==
Kirtilals has locations in several of India's southern cities. These include Bangalore, Chennai, Coimbatore, Vijayawada,Hyderabad, Kochi, Madurai, and several others.
