= Brookefields Mall =

Building in India

Brookefields
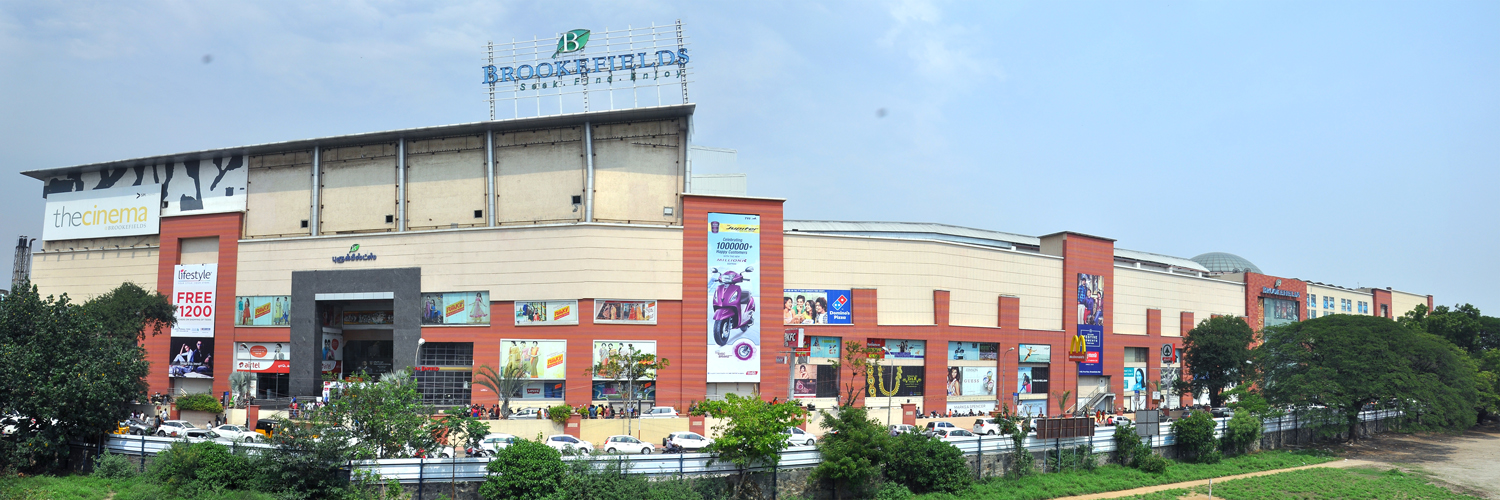
- Panorama view of Brookfields shopping mall
- Location: Coimbatore, Tamil Nadu, India
- Coordinates: 11°0′30.18″N 76°57′35.42″E
- Address: Brooke Bond Road
- Opened: May 2009
- Developer: Brookefields Estates Pvt. Ltd
- Num. of stores: 120
- Floor area: 450,000 sq ft (42,000 m^{2})
- Floors: 4 floors (including the ground floor) + 3 basements for parking facility
- Parking: Multistorey Parking lot
- Website: www.brookefields.com

Brookefields is a shopping mall located on Brookebond Road (Krishnasamy Road) in Coimbatore, India. It was opened in May 2009. The mall has outlets from major clothing and apparel brands, a six-screen multiplex cinema, and a food court serving multi-cuisine dishes.

== History ==
The mall was officially opened to the public in May 2009 and quickly grew into becoming the largest entertainment hub in Coimbatore at that time. The land previously belonged to Brooke Bond Lipton which had a tea processing unit upon it.

Later in 2016, Blackstone Inc. was set to buy the mall to be part of their Nexus Malls brand but failed due to some land rights issues with the owners.

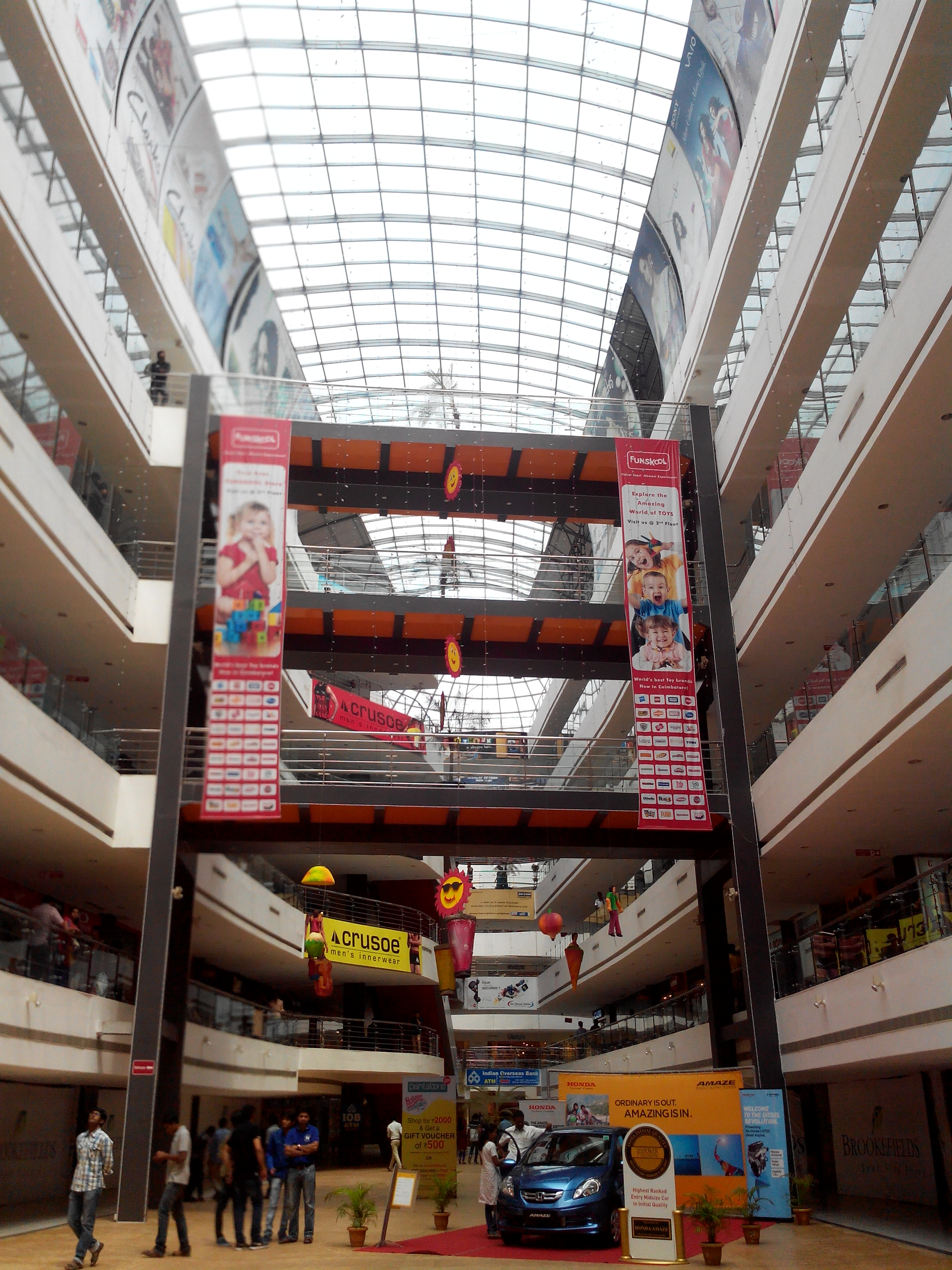
Inside Brookefields mall in May 2014

== Facilities ==
The mall has so many facilities. A banquet hall was opened lately the previous year. There is a food court located on the third floor with a variety of foods and popular brands such as KFC, Pizza Hut, McDonald's, and much more. The PVR Cinemas, is 6-screened on the fourth floor. The SPAR Hypermarket is located near the 1st basement. The Hamleys Store is in the building which has a mirror maze in it and a collection of various toys for the children. There is a mini snow park inside the campus, opened in 2022, just after the quarantine. Fun City, a subsidiary of the Landmark Group, provides the children with a fun way to enjoy.

There are wheelchair, lift and parking facilities too.

== Gallery ==
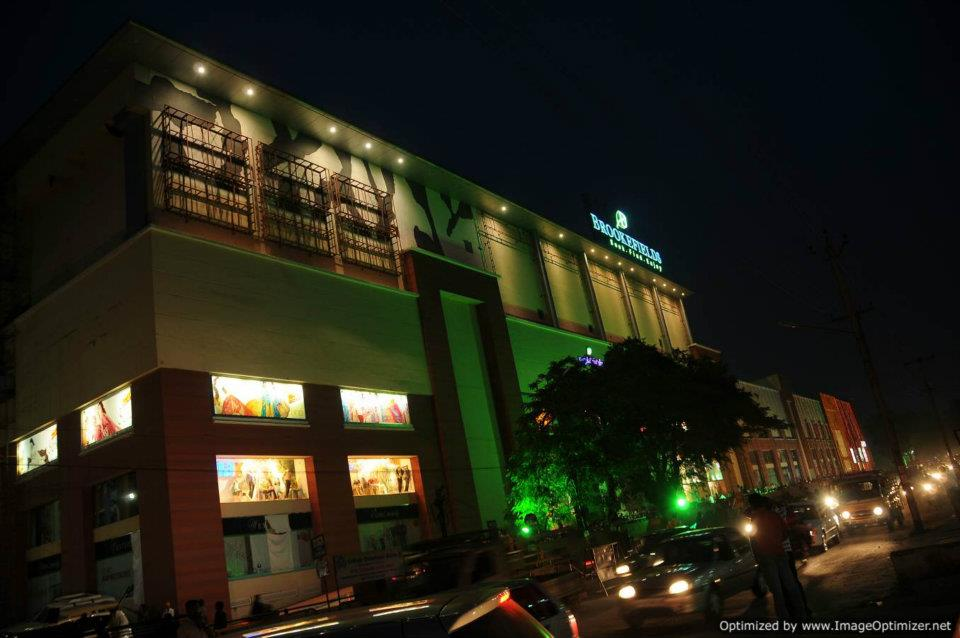
Brookefields mall in the evening

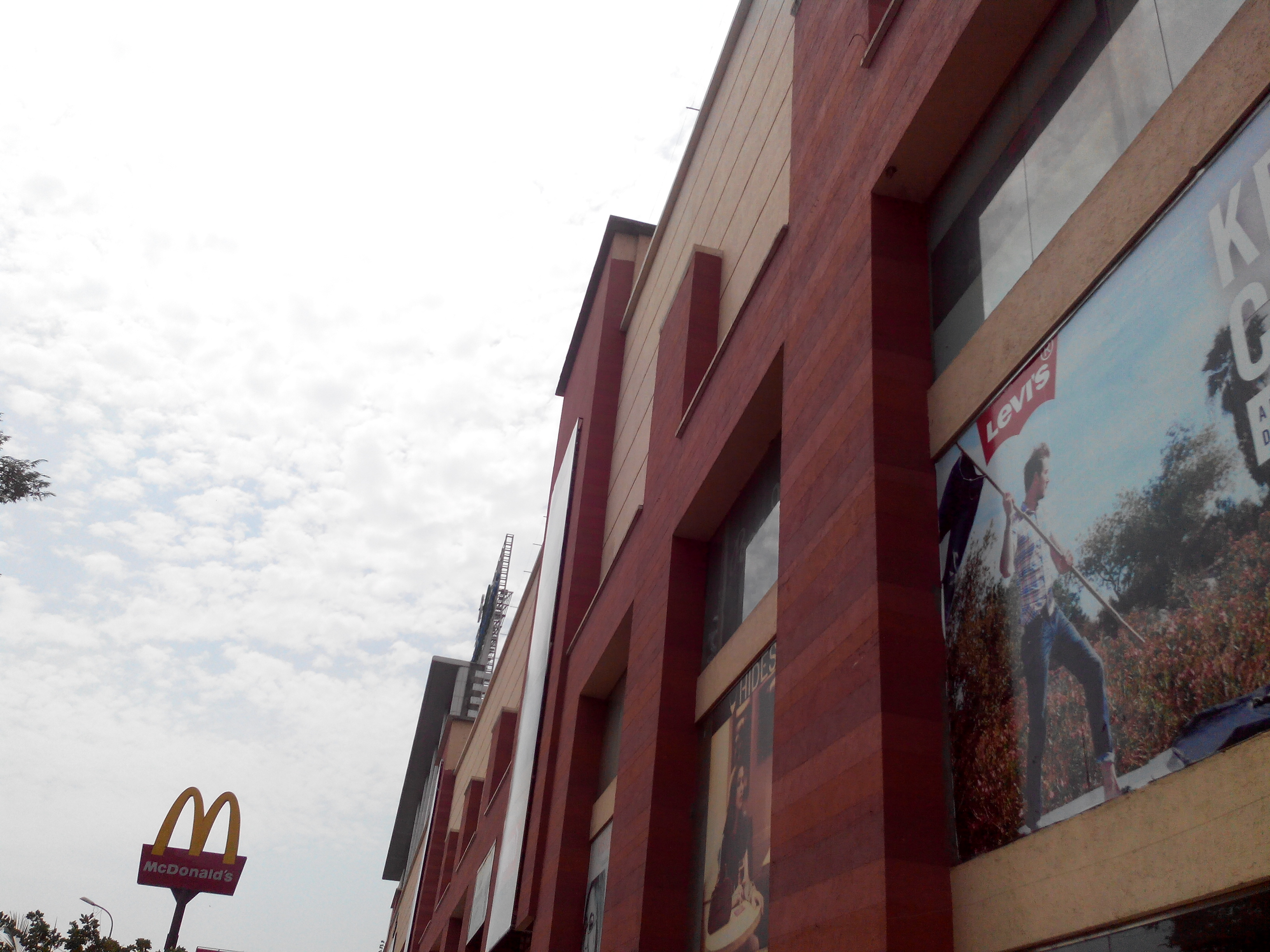
Another view of the mall with the ads

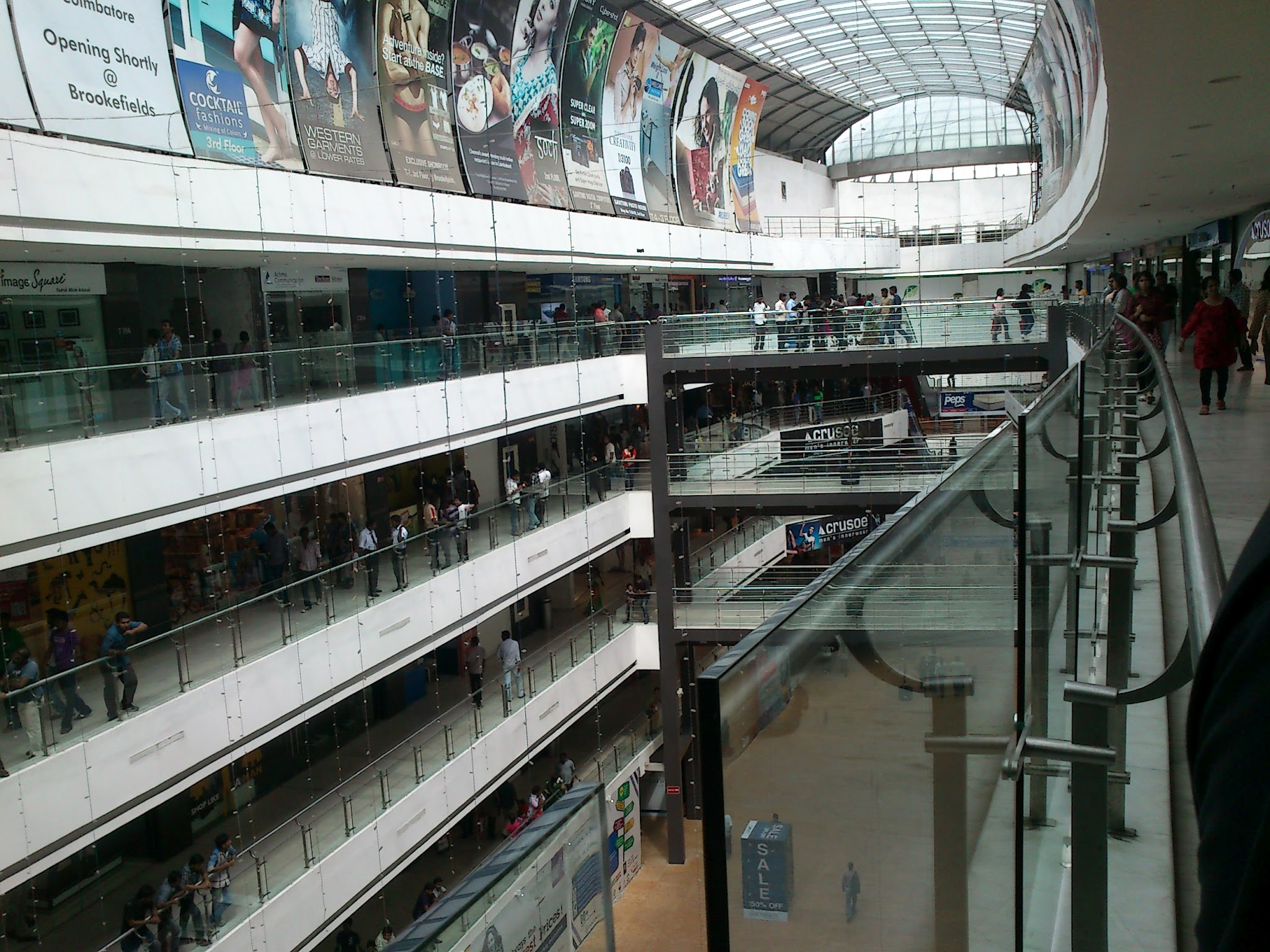
Inside view

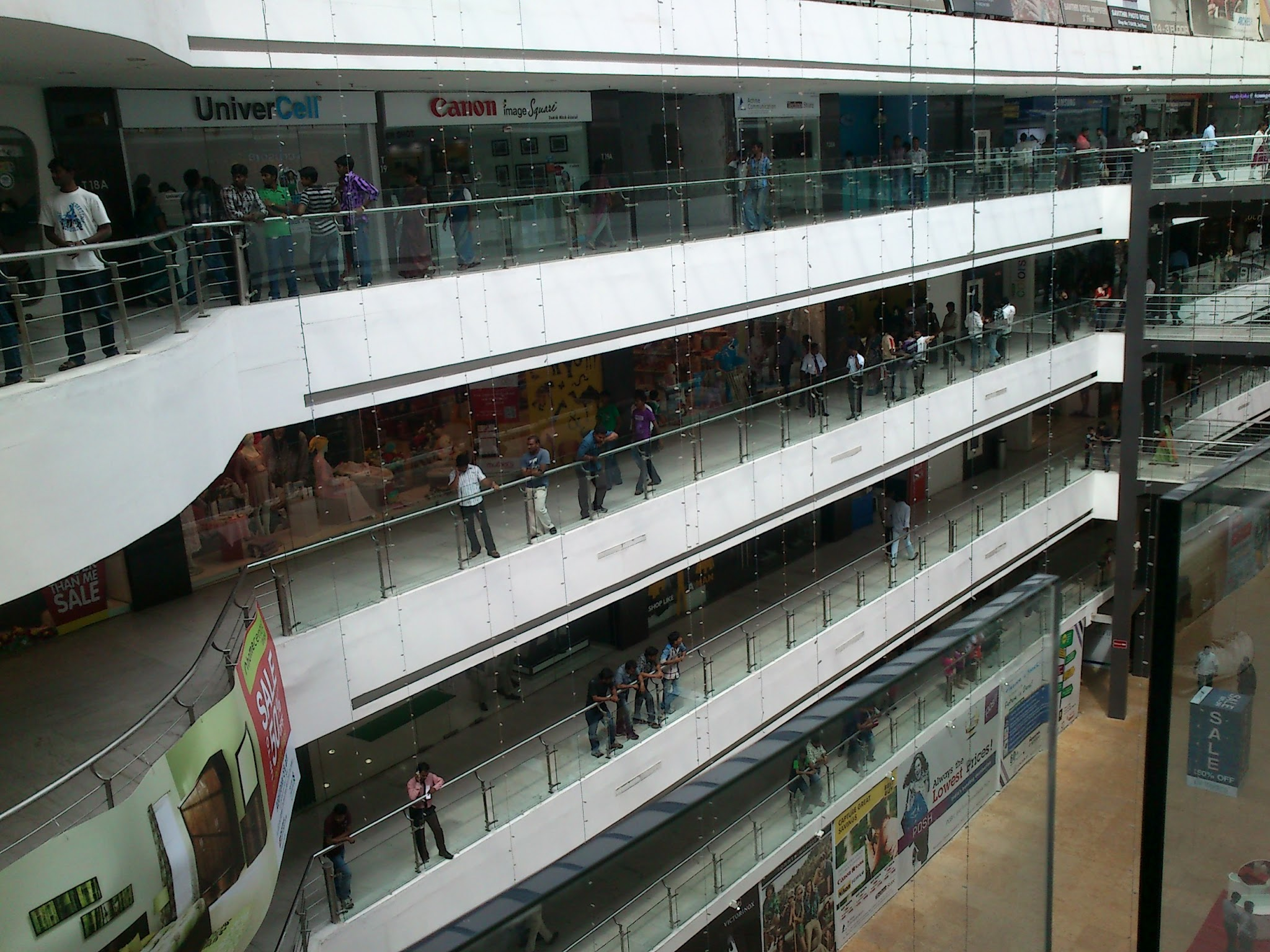
Inside view

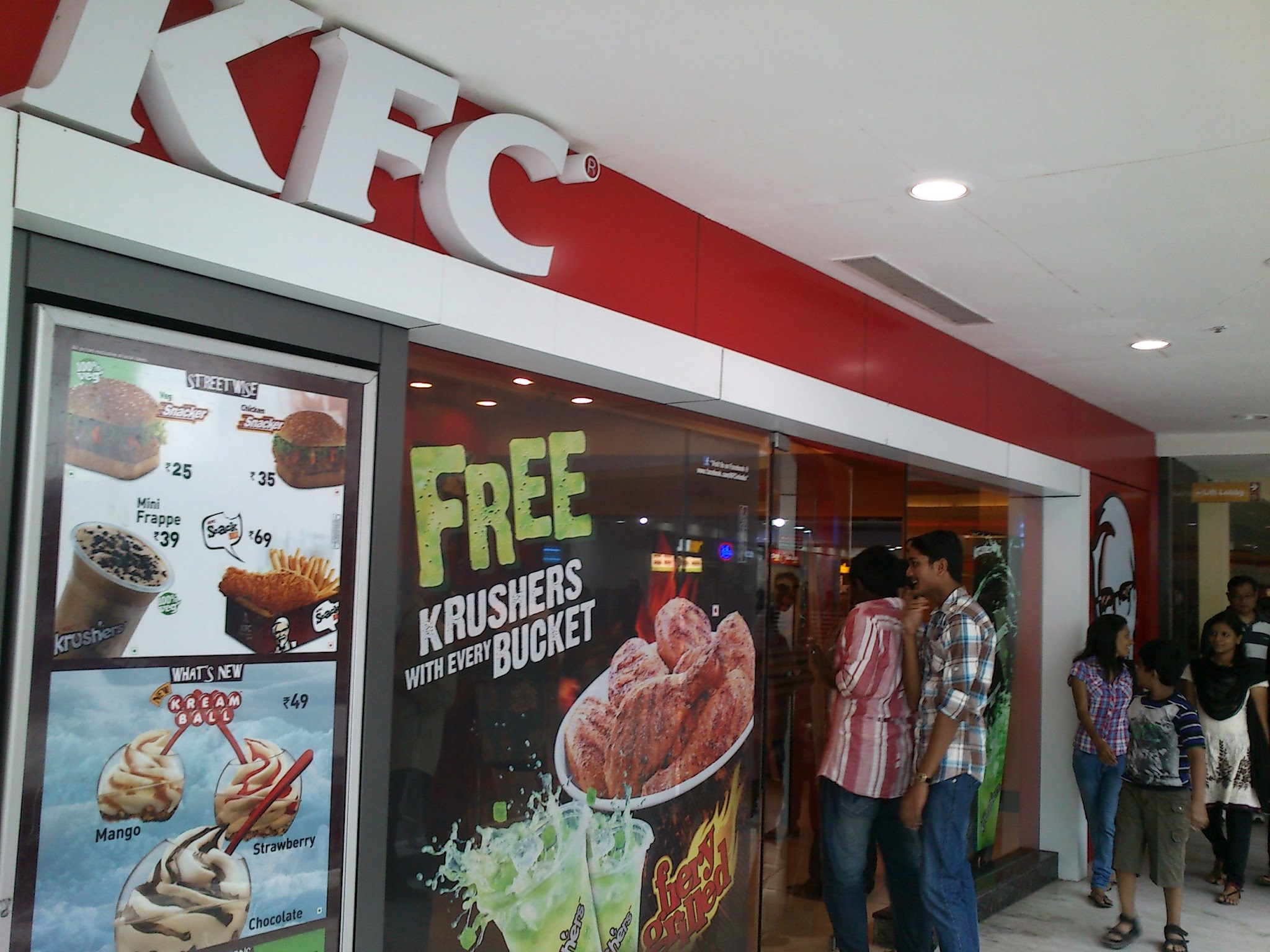
KFC at Brookefields

== See also ==
- Coimbatore
- List of shopping malls in India
- Prozone mall
- PVR
