= Bannari Amman Group =

Indian industrial conglomerate

- Type: Private
- Industry: Conglomerate
- Founder: S. V. Balasubramaniam
- Headquarters: Coimbatore, Tamil Nadu, India
- Area served: Worldwide
- Key people: S. V. Balasubramaniam (chairman); B. Saravanan (managing director)
- Products: Sugars, Renewable energy, Granite, Alcohol, Liquor
- Website: www.bannari.com

Bannari Amman Group is an industrial conglomerate based in Tamil Nadu, with presence in manufacturing, trading and service. Manufacturing and trading activities include sugar, alcohol, liquor, granite etc. The service sector has wind power energy, education etc. It was founded by S. V. Balasubramaniam who is the Chairman of the group.

== History ==
In the beginning 1980s, BAG mainly was a sugar manufacturer. The by-product of the sugar production - Molasses - was used for their distilleries.
