= Roots Industries =

Manufacturer based in India

Roots Group of Companies
- Company type: Private
- Founded: 1970
- Founder: K. Ramsamy
- Headquarters: Coimbatore, Tamilnadu, India
- Website: Official website

Roots Industries India Limited is an Indian automobile brand making vehicle horns. The company produces products such as industrial cleaning systems, scrubber driers, electric buses, and battery-operated vehicles. It was founded in 1970 by K. Ramasamy.
