= Shanthi Feeds =

Indian food and products company

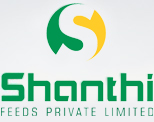
- Type: Private
- Industry: Poultry farming
- Founded: 1988
- Founder: R Lakshmanan
- Headquarters: Coimbatore, Tamil Nadu, India
- Area served: India
- Key people: R Lakshmanan (Chairman and MD)
- Products: Chicken Meat, Poultry & Cattle Feeds
- Website: www.shanthifeeds.com

Shanthi Feeds Limited is an Indian multinational food products company headquartered in Coimbatore, India. The company was started in 1988 and is involved in broiler farming, hatcheries, feed mills for poultry and cattle, farming of soya, corn and wind energy projects. It markets and exports broiler chicken, frozen chicken, chicken eggs. The company has a production capacity of nearly 47 Million birds per annum.

== History ==
The business began as a poultry farm in 1988. It was incorporated as Shanthi Poultry Farm Private Limited in April 2006 and renamed Shanthi Feeds Private Limited in August 2012.

The company began producing poultry feed in 1990. In May 2007, it launched cattle feed under the Shanthi brand in Tamil Nadu and Kerala, using its existing poultry-feed distribution network.

By 2015, Shanthi Feeds was supplying chicks to farmers participating in the Tamil Nadu government's Scheme for Poultry Development in Ariyalur district. Participating farmers obtained loans and subsidies from the state government and the National Bank for Agriculture and Rural Development.

The company expanded and modernised its feed manufacturing facilities through production lines commissioned in December 2024 and December 2025. Following these additions, its installed feed production capacity reached 3,120 tonnes per day.

== Operations ==
Shanthi Feeds operates a vertically integrated poultry business. In 2024, it worked with more than 1,500 contract broiler farms, alongside breeding, hatchery, feed manufacturing and slaughterhouse operations. Its contract farms used open-sided housing with natural ventilation and lighting, supplemented by sprinklers and foggers.

The company produces feed for its own poultry operations and for sale to other farmers. In 2023, approximately half of its feed production was consumed internally and the remainder was sold externally. Its product range also included broiler birds, processed chicken, breeding birds and hatching eggs.

Its processed chicken business supplies retailers, restaurants and institutional buyers in Tamil Nadu and Kerala.

Shanthi Feeds also generates electricity for its production facilities. As of March 2025, it had 15.8 MW of wind power capacity and 2 MW of solar power capacity.
