= Semmandapatti =

Semmamdapatti
- Village panchayat
- Location in Tamil Nadu, India
- Coordinates: 11°29′35.3″N 78°04′48.2″E
- Country: India
- State: Tamilnadu
- District: Namakkal
- Taluk: Rasipuram
- Block: Vennandur block

Language
  - Official: Tamil
- PIN: 637505
- Area code: +91-4287

Semmandapatti is a village panchayat in Vennandur block, Namakkal District
