= Mahatma Gandhi Stadium =

Sports stadium in Salem, India

- Interactive map of Mahatma Gandhi Stadium

Ground information
- Location: Salem, Tamil Nadu
- Country: India
- Coordinates: 11.6602°N 78.1533°E
- Establishment: 1972
- Capacity: n/a
- End names
- n/a

Team information
Tamil Nadu cricket team	(1967-1992)
- As of 22 August, 2015; Source: Ground profile

Mahatma Gandhi Stadium is a sports stadium in Salem, Tamil Nadu. The stadium has hosted seven first-class matches from 1973 when Tamil Nadu cricket team played against Kerala cricket team. The ground hosted its last first-class matches in 1992 when Tamil Nadu cricket team played against Andhra cricket team. The stadium was named after the famous Indian activist of the same name.

The stadium was established in 1972 which managed and owned by Sports Authority of India. As condition of stadium was not very good and there was no renovation was done since it was built. But in 2013, Government of Tamil Nadu decided to renovate the stadium by sanctioned Rs. 1 crore off which Rs. 60 lakhs will be used for 400 m athletic track, a football ground, grass lawns, and a walker's path and Volleyball, basketball courts and infrastructure including toilet facilities will be improved.
