= Pricol =

Indian manufacturing and engineering company

Pricol Limited
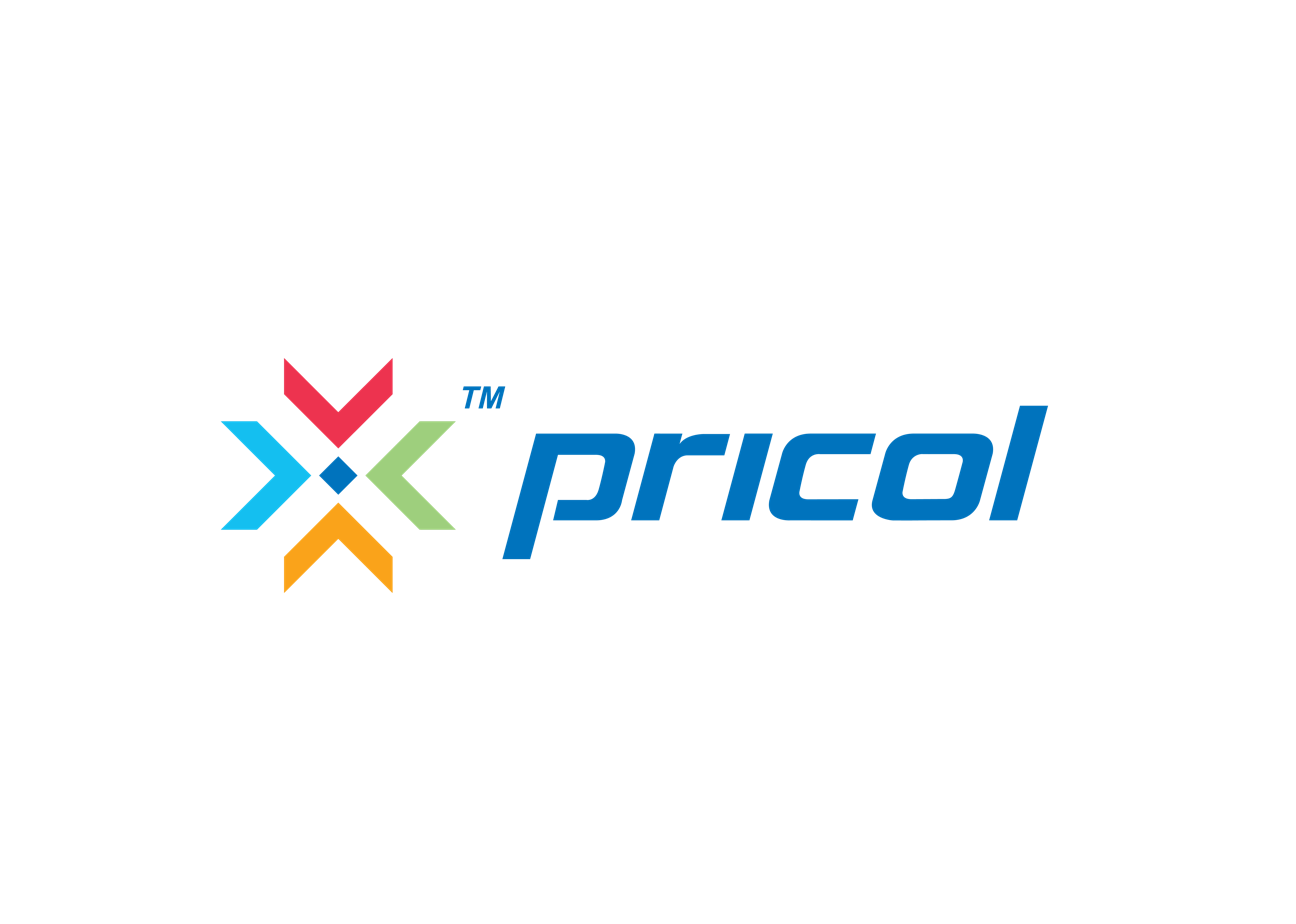
- Type: Public
- Traded as: NSE: PRICOLLTD; BSE: 540293
- Industry: Automotive
- Founded: 1975
- Headquarters: Coimbatore, Tamil Nadu, India
- Key people: Vijay Mohan (Founder); Vikram Mohan (Managing Director); Vanitha Mohan (Chairman)
- Products: Dash Board Instruments, Sensors (All Types), Oil Pumps, Auto Accessories, Chain Tensioners, Idle Speed Control Valves, etc
- Revenue: ▲₹3,963.85 crore (US$410 million)(FY26)
- Operating income: INR 3,963.85 crore, March 31, 2026
- Number of employees: 5,500+
- Website: pricol.com

Pricol Limited (founded as Premier Instruments and Controls Limited) is an automotive components and precision engineered products manufacturer based in Coimbatore, India. It was founded in 1975 by the late V.N. Ramachandran and N.Damodaran, but started production in 1975. It manufactures automotive components for motorcycles, scooters, cars, trucks, buses, tractors and off-road vehicles used in the construction and Industrial segment. Pricol also manufacture sintered components and products for fleet management. Vijay Mohan is the Founder, Vikram Mohan is the Managing Director and Vanitha Mohan is the Chairperson.

== Locations ==
Pricol Limited has six manufacturing plants in India, Plants 1,3 & 4 in Coimbatore, Plant 2 & 9 in Manesar, Plant 5 in Pune, Plant 10 in Sricity and Plant 12 in Satara. The company also has a plant operating in Jakarta (Indonesia) and business offices in Tokyo, Singapore, Cologne (Germany) and Detroit (USA).

Pricol also acquiesced a group company PMP of Ashok Piramal group, which operates the manufacturing plants in Satara (India), Rudrapur (India), Puebla (Mexico) and in Prague (Czech republic), they bought complete wiper business from PMP.

== Operations ==
Pricol operates in five business areas: driver information systems, switches, actuators and sensors, powertrain products, telematics and infotainment, and fleet management systems.

== Products ==
=== Driver Information System Products ===
- Instrument clusters (analog + digital)
- TFT digital clusters
- Smart displays & infotainment systems
- E-cockpit systems
- Heads-up displays (HUD)
- Telematics control units (TCU)

=== Power Train Products ===
- Sintered components
- Oil pumps
- Water pumps
- Chain tensioners
- Auto fuel cock
- Fuel pumps & modules
- Chain tensioners
- Idle speed control valves
- Pressure relief valves
- Auto fuel cock systems
- Brake-related components (including disc brake expansion)

=== Sensors & Switches ===
- Speed sensors
- Fuel level sensors
- Selective catalytic reduction
- Map and Tmap sensors
- Oil level switch
- Temperature sensor
- Brake light switch
- Vacuum switch
- Power sockets
- Pressure sensor
- Position sensor

=== Telematics & Infotainment ===
- Display & Infotainment
- Body control module
- Telematics products

=== Fleet Management Systems ===
- Speed limiter
- Centralized Lubrication Systems
- Vehicle tracking system
- Digital tax fare meter
- Cabin Tilting Systems
- Journey risk management

Precision Products

- Injection moulded plastic components
- Precision engineered automotive parts
- High-volume polymer components

== History ==
Key events in Pricol Limited's history

| Year | Event |
|---|---|
| 1972 | Founded, as Premier Instruments and Controls Limited. |
| 1975 | Started Production |
| 1979 | First Dividend Declaration |
| 1988 | Set up second plant in Gurgaon, India |
| 1993 | Listed in Bombay stock exchange |
| 1995 | Listed in National stock exchange |
| 1999 | Set up Plant 3 and 4 in Coimbatore, India |
| 2001 | Launched disc brakes for two wheelers |
| 2003 | Started a new company Xenos technologies for vehicle security systems |
| 2005 | Opened manufacturing plant in Pune, India |
| 2006 | Opened branch office Detroit, USA and PT Pricol Surya |
| 2007 | Set up manufacturing plant 6 in Pantnagar, India |
| 2008 | Set up manufacturing plant 7 in Pantnagar, India |
| 2012 | Signed Joint Venture with Johnson controls 50:50 |
| 2014 | Xenos technologies merged with Pricol Limited |
| 2015 | Acquired Brazil based auto component maker, Melling |
| 2015 | Exits Joint venture with Denso and Acquired Johnson Controls' 50% stake in Joint Venture |
| 2021 | Strategic Alliance with Candera CGI Studios |
| 2022 | Strategic Partnership with Sibros Technologies |
| 2022 | Entered into a strategic technology partnership with BMS Powersafe |
| 2023 | Strategic Partnership with Heilongjiang Tianyouwei Electronics (TYW) for advanced technologies |
| 2024 | Acquisition of Sundaram Auto Components Pvt Ltd from TVS Group and established Pricol Precision Products Private Limited |
| 2025 | Strategic Technology License Agreement with DOMINO S.r.l. for motorcycle control systems |

== Group Companies ==
- Pricol Limited
  - Pricol Precision Products Private Limited
- Pricol Engineering
- Pricol Logistics
- Pricol Travel
- Pricol Gourmet
- Pricol Retreats
  - Dvara
