= Ponparappipatti =

Ponparappipatti பொன்பரப்பிபட்டி
- Village panchayat
- Location in Tamil Nadu, India
- Coordinates: 11°32′16.7″N 78°06′31.9″E
- Country: India
- State: Tamilnadu
- District: Namakkal
- Taluk: Rasipuram
- Block: Vennandur block

Language
  - Official: Tamil
- PIN: 637505
- Area code: +91-4287

Ponparappipatti is a village panchayat in Vennandur block of Namakkal District in Tamil Nadu, India. Ponsorimalai, also known as Sorimalai, is a hill in Vennandur block of Namakkal district.

== Temples ==
- Ponparappipatti Murugan Temple
- Thenthiruvannamalai- Annamalayar Temple
