= Nachipatti =

- Village panchayat
- Location in Tamil Nadu, India
- Coordinates: 11°30′48.9″N 78°04′38.5″E
- Country: India
- State: Tamilnadu
- District: Namakkal
- Taluk: Rasipuram
- Block: Vennandur block

Language
  - Official: Tamil
- PIN: 637505
- Area code: +91-4287

Nachipatti is a village panchayat in Vennandur block of Namakkal District in Tamil Nadu.
