= Electronics Corporation of Tamil Nadu =

Indian public sector undertaking

Electronics Corporation of Tamil Nadu Limited
- Native name: தமிழ்நாடு மின்னணுவியல் கழகம்
- Type: Government-owned corporation
- Industry: Electronics
- Founded: 21 March 1977
- Headquarters: Chennai, Tamil Nadu, India
- Area served: Tamil Nadu
- Key people: Dr Atul Anand IAS (Chairman) B Vishnu Chandran IAS (Managing Director)
- Owner: Government of Tamil Nadu
- Parent: Department of Information Technology and Digital Services
- Website: www.elcot.tn.gov.in

The Electronics Corporation of Tamil Nadu Limited (ELCOT) (Tamil: தமிழ்நாடு மின்னணுவியல் கழகம் (வரையறுக்கப்பட்டது)) is an Indian, public sector undertaking, established on 21 March 1977. ELCOT functions to promote, establish and run State Public Sector Enterprises for Electronic items; manage, supervise, finance, advise, assist, aid or collaborate with any private and public associations, firms, companies, enterprises, undertakings, institutions, and schemes for the advancement and development of electronics and information technology. It is considered the back office for the Information Technology Department of the Government of Tamil Nadu, and functions to implement the Government's E-Governance initiative.
