= Kanjamalai =

Hill in Tamil Nadu, India

Coordinates: 11°36′59.76″N 78°3′32.75″E

Kanjamalai is a hill located 14 km west of Salem, in Salem District of Tamil Nadu, India. The estimated terrain elevation above sea level is about 1643 meter.

Iron ore found in the hills had an average iron content of 35% and it was more than 45% in the northern flank of the hills and it is an important hill station in Tamil Nadu.
