= Salem Town railway station =

Railway station in India

Salem Town

General information
- Location: Town railway station road. Salem, Tamil Nadu; India
- Coordinates: 11.7383°N 78.0452°E
- Elevation: 285 metres (935 ft)
- System: Indian Railways station
- Owner: Indian Railways
- Operator: Southern Railway zone
- Line: Salem–Vriddhacahalam line
- Platforms: 2
- Tracks: 4
- Connections: Bus, auto rickshaw

Construction
- Structure type: Standard (on-ground station)
- Parking: Yes
- Accessible: Yes

Other information
- Status: Functioning
- Station code: SXT
- Zone(s): Southern Railway zone
- Division(s): Salem
- Fare zone: Indian Railways
Location
- Location within India Location within Tamil Nadu

Salem Town railway station (station code: SXT) is an NSG–5 category Indian railway station in Salem railway division of Southern Railway zone. It is a railway station on the Salem–Virudhachalam railway line in Salem district, Tamil Nadu, India.

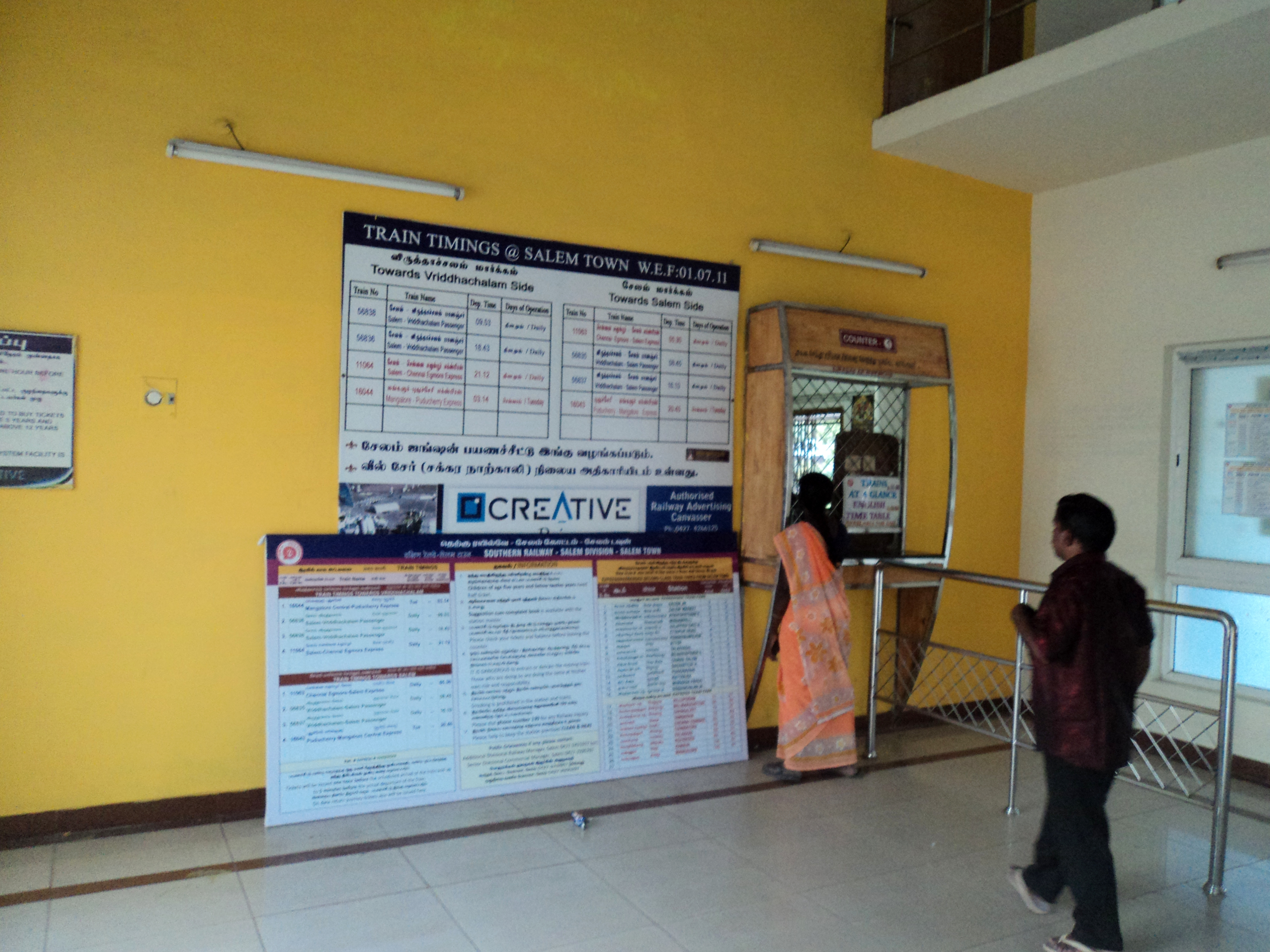
Ticket counter at Salem Town station
