= Vennanthur =

Vennanthur Vennandur
- Town Panchayat
- Aerial view of Vennanthur from Alavaimalai

- Location in Tamil Nadu, India
- Coordinates: 11°31′14″N 78°05′14″E
- Country: India
- State: Tamil Nadu
- District: Namakkal
- Taluk: Rasipuram
- Revenue block: Vennandur block

Government
  - Type: Town panchayat
  - Body: Vennanthur Town panchayat

Area
  - Total: 4.81 km^{2} (1.86 sq mi)

Population (2011)
  - Total: 14,568
  - Density: 3,030/km^{2} (7,840/sq mi)

Languages
  - Official: Tamil
- Time zone: UTC+5:30 (IST)
- PIN: 637505
- Area code: +91-4287
- Vehicle registration: TN-28

Vennanthur or Vennandur is a panchayat town of Rasipuram taluk, Namakkal district in the Indian state of Tamil Nadu. It is located about 39 km (24 mi) from Namakkal. Spread across an area of 4.81 km^{2} (1.86 sq mi), the town panchayat is divided into 15 wards. It had a population of 14,568 as per the 2011 census.

== Geography and administration ==
Vennanthur is a town panchayat in Rasipuram taluk of Namakkal district in the Indian state of Tamil Nadu. The town panchayat covers an area of 4.81 km^{2} (1.86 sq mi) and is divided into 15 wards and 47 streets. The town panchayat has two lakes–Vennandur lake, and Mathiyampatti lake.

The panchayat administration is responsible for providing basic services including maintenance of roads, water supply, health and sanitation. Vennanthur forms part of the Rasipuram Assembly constituency of the Tamil Nadu Legislative Assembly and the Namakkal Lok Sabha constituency. Vennandur forms part of the Vennandur block consisting of 24 villages.

== Demographics ==
According to the 2011 census, Vennanthur had a population of 14,568 across 3,844 households. The population consisted of 7,427 males and 7,141 females. About 1,328 (9.1%) of the population were children aged less than six years. The town panchayat had a literacy rate of approximately 73.4%, with male literacy at 81.6% and female literacy at 65%. Scheduled Castes accounted for approximately 7.2% of the population, while Scheduled Tribes accounted for less than 0.1%.

As per the 2011 census, Hinduism was the predominant religion, practiced by 96% of the population, followed by Islam (3.5%) and Christianity (0.4%). The town panchayat has nine Hindu temples, including the Selva Vinayagar Temple managed by the Hindu Religious and Charitable Endowments Department. Annual temple festivals celebrated in the town panchayat include the local festivals dedicated to Mariamman and Muniyappan in August and September respectively, and Surasamharam in November.

== Economy ==
The area contains clay loam soils, and the agricultural lands are generally irrigated by wells. Millets form the major crop, and others crops include rice, oil seeds, sugercane, cotton, and pulses. Sericulture is also practiced with the revenue block producing 56,180 kg (123,860 lb) of silk cocoons in 2014-15. Other industries in the block include production of cotton yarn, PVC pipes, construction materials including bricks. According to a 2017 report by the Tamil Nadu Pollution Control Board, the block is classified as "over exploited" in terms of availability of ground water.

The working population in the town panchayat constituted approximately 55.5% of the total population, comprising 8,082 workers, of whom 4,770 were males and 3,312 were females. Of the total working population, 92.5% were engaged in main work, while 7.5% were engaged in marginal work.

== Transport ==
Vennanthur is located about 39 km (24 mi) from Namakkal along the road connecting Rasipuram and Attayampatti. The nearest railway station is Rasipuram railway station located approximately 15.4 km (9.6 mi) away and the nearest airport is the Salem Airport.
