= Vennandur block =

Vennandur Union வெண்ணந்தூர் ஒன்றியம்
- Areal view of Vennandur block from Alavaimalai

- Location in Tamil Nadu, India
- Coordinates: 11°30′37.6″N 78°05′52.5″E
- Country: India
- State: Tamil Nadu
- District: Namakkal
- Taluk: Rasipuram

Government
  - Chief Minister: Edappadi K. Palanisamy
  - Namakkal M.P.: A.K.P.CHINRAJ
  - Rasipuram M.L.A: V. Saroja

Population (2011)
  - Total: 62,045
- Demonym(s): Tamils, Indian

Languages
  - Official: Tamil (தமிழ்)
- Time zone: UTC+5:30 (IST)
- PIN: 637505
- Area code: +91-4287
- Vehicle registration: TN-28Z
- Website: http://www.namakkal.tn.nic.in/contacts.html

Vennandur block is a revenue block in the Namakkal district of Tamil Nadu, India. Vennandur block is located in north eastern region in Namakkal district. It has a total of 24 panchayat villages. Vennanthur town is the head quarter of this block.

== Geography ==
Vennandur block is located at 11°30′37.6″N 78°05′52.5″E. It has an average elevation of 218 metres (726 ft). It is close to Alavaimalai Hills - which is part of the Eastern Ghats. The closest river is Thirumanimutharu origin from mount yercaud. Namakkal is the district capital is located around 39 km from Vennandur. Chennai, the state capital, is located around 370 km from Vennandur. The other nearest state capital from Vennandr is Bangalore and its distance is 223 km, Pondicherry is 237 km and Thiruvananthapuram is 517 km.

== Administrative Office & Administration ==
Vennandur union office is located at Attayampatti-Masakkalipatti (DMR) road in Vennandur. In Vennandur revenue block of Namakkal District there are twenty four villages and many sub villages. All villages are electrified in the Vennandur block.

== Agriculture ==
Cent percent rural in character. The average rainfall is 712.3 (in mms) in the Vennandur block. Of the total food crops, 18462 hectares are food crops. 49.88 percent are net area sown in this block. Paddy, Ragi, Cholam, Cumbu, etc., are 13.40 percent in the food crops. There are commercial food crops like groundnut, Sugarcane, Tapioca, cotton, etc., are 25.85 percent in Vennandur block. 60.74 percent are other food crops in Vennandur block. There are 2607 hectares of land irrigated with dug wells, 4423 wells are used for irrigation in Vennandur block. The total number of agricultural holdings in Vennandur block are 6,503. Of this, 53.05 percent holdings are less than one hectare, 27.72 percent holdings are between 1 - 2 hectare, 17.54 percent holdings are between 2-4 hectare, 1.59 percent holdings are between 4-10 hectare, 0.07 percent holdings are 10 and above in the Vennandur block.

== Number of Panchayat Villages (24) ==
- Anandagoundampalayam is a village located in Vennandur block.
- Akkaraipatti
- Alampatti
- Alavaipatti
- Kallankulam
- Kattanachampatti
- Keelur
- Kuttaladampatti
- Mathiyampatti
- Mattuvelampatti
- Minnakkal
- Moolakadu
- Nachipatti
- Naduppatty
- No 3 Komarapalayam
- O Sowthapuram
- Palanthinnipatti
- Pallavanaickenpatti
- Ponparappipatti
- R Pudupalayam
- Semmandapatti
- Thengalpalayam
- Thottipatti
- Thottiyavalasu
