= Kyra (given name) =

Kyra is a feminine given name that may derive from the Greek word kurá (meaning lady) or from Cyra, the feminine form of Cyrus.

== Notable people with the name include ==
- Kyra Tirana Barry (born 1966), American wrestling leader
- Kyra Harris Bolden (born 1988), American attorney
- Kyra Carusa (born 1995), American soccer player
- Kyra Christmas (born 1997), Canadian Olympic athlete
- Kyra Condie (born 1996), American rock climber
- Kyra Constantine (born 1998), African-Canadian Olympic athlete
- Kyra Cooney-Cross (born 2002), Australian soccer player
- Kyra Davis (born 1972), American mystery novelist
- Kyra Dickinson (born 1993), Canadian soccer player
- Kyra Dossa (born 2004), American freestyle skier
- Kyra Downton (1913–1999), American equestrian
- Kyra Dutt (born 1991), Indian film actress
- Kyra Edwards (born 1997), British rower
- Kyra Elzy (born 1978), African-American basketball team coach
- Kyra Fortuin (born 1997), Dutch field hockey player
- Kyra Frosini (1773–1801), Greek socialite
- Kyra Gaunt, American professor
- Kyra Giorgi (born 1977), Australian author
- Kyra Gracie (born 1985), Brazilian jiu-jitsu practitioner
- Kyra E. Hicks (born 1965), American author
- Kyra Hoffner, American politician from Delaware
- Kyra T. Inachin (1968–2012), German historian
- Kyra Jefferson (born 1994), American professional sprinter
- Kyra Kupetsky (born 1993), American animator
- Kyra Kyrklund (born 1951), Finnish dressage rider and trainer
- Kyra Lamberink (born 1996), Dutch track cyclist
- Kyra Lambert (born 1996), American basketball player
- Kyra Leroux (born 2002), Canadian actress and dancer
- Kyra Malinowski (born 1993), German football player
- Kyra Markham (1891–1967), American painter and actress
- Kyra Montes (born 1998), American-Nicaraguan footballer
- Kyra Nichols (born 1958), American ballet dancer and teacher
- Kyra Nijinsky (1914–1998), Russian ballet dancer
- Kyra Phillips (born 1968), American correspondent
- Kyra Poh (born 2002), Singaporean indoor skydiver
- Kyra Reznikov (born 1979), South Australian lawyer
- Kyra Santoro (born 1993), American actress and model
- Kyra Sedgwick (born 1965), American actress
- Kyra Shroff (born 1992), Indian tennis player
- Kyra Simon (born 2002), Australian rugby union player
- Kyra Sundance (born 1970), American dog trainer, performer and author
- Kyra Vassiliki (1789–1834), Greek woman
- Kyra Vayne (1916–2001), Russian-born British opera singer
- Kyra Petrovskaya Wayne (1918–2018), American-Russian author
- Kyra Zagorsky (born 1976), American film actress

== See also ==
- Cyra (name)
- Kiera, a given name
- Kira (disambiguation)
- Kyla (disambiguation)
- Kyra (disambiguation)
