= Kiran =

Kiran or Kıran may refer to:

== Names ==
- Kiran (given name), unisex name given primarily for people in Nepal, India and other South Asian countries (including a list of persons with the name)
- Kiran, an anglicised variant of the Gaelic given name Ciarán

== People ==
- Kiran, pseudonym of the Indian writer Kanchinath Jha
- Fatih Kıran (born 1993), German footballer
- Hakan Kıran (Born 1962), Turkish architect
- Prema Kiran, Indian actress
- Sashi Kiran, Fijian politician

== Places ==
- Kirən, a village and municipality in Azerbaijan
- Kiran, a spelling variant of Karan, which may refer to several place names in Iran, see Karan, Iran (disambiguation)
- Kiran, Republic of Buryatia, a small town in Buryatia, Russia
- Kiran, Sri Lanka, a town in Sri Lanka
- Kıran, Alaplı, a village in Zonguldak Province, Turkey
- Kıran, Bingöl, a village in Bingöl Province, Turkey
- Kıran, İnegöl, a neighbourhood in Bursa Province, Turkey
- Kıran, Köşk, a neighbourhood in Aydın Province, Turkey
- Kıran, Sincik or Pınarbaşı, a village in Adıyaman Province, Turkey
- Kıran, Taşköprü, a village in Kastamonu Province, Turkey

== Other ==
- Kiran fonts, a Devanagari typeface and font
- HAL Kiran, an Indian aircraft
- Kiran (TV serial), a 1993 Urdu drama written by Khalid Ahmad.
- Kiran (serial), a 2017 Pakistani television drama serial that aired on Geo Entertainment
- Kiran (college festival)
- Artocarpus odoratissimus, a tropical plant sometimes known as kiran
- Operation Kiran, a 2019 military conflict in Turkey

== See also ==
- Keeran (disambiguation)
