= Paul Emil Jacobs =

German painter

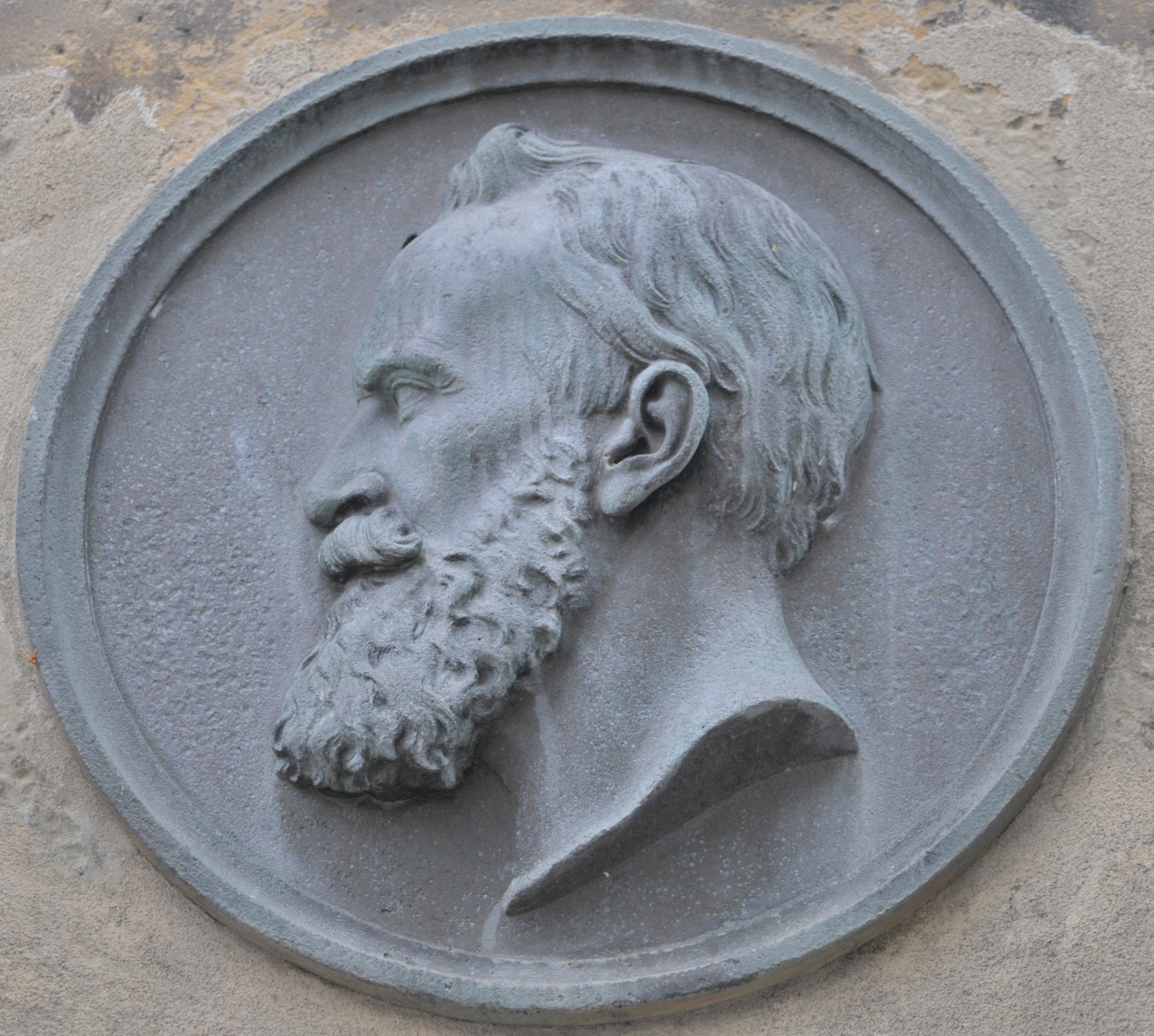
- Paul-Emil-Jacobs, Stele in Gotha (detail)
- Born: 20 August 1802; Gotha, Germany
- Died: 6 January 1866 (aged 63); Gotha, Germany
- Education: Munich Academy of Fine Arts
- Known for: Painter
- Notable work: Portraits, Orientalist themes, Nudes
- Movement: Orientalist

Paul Emil Jacobs (August 20, 1802 – January 6, 1866) was a German painter, noted for Orientalist themes, portraits and nudes.

== Life and career ==
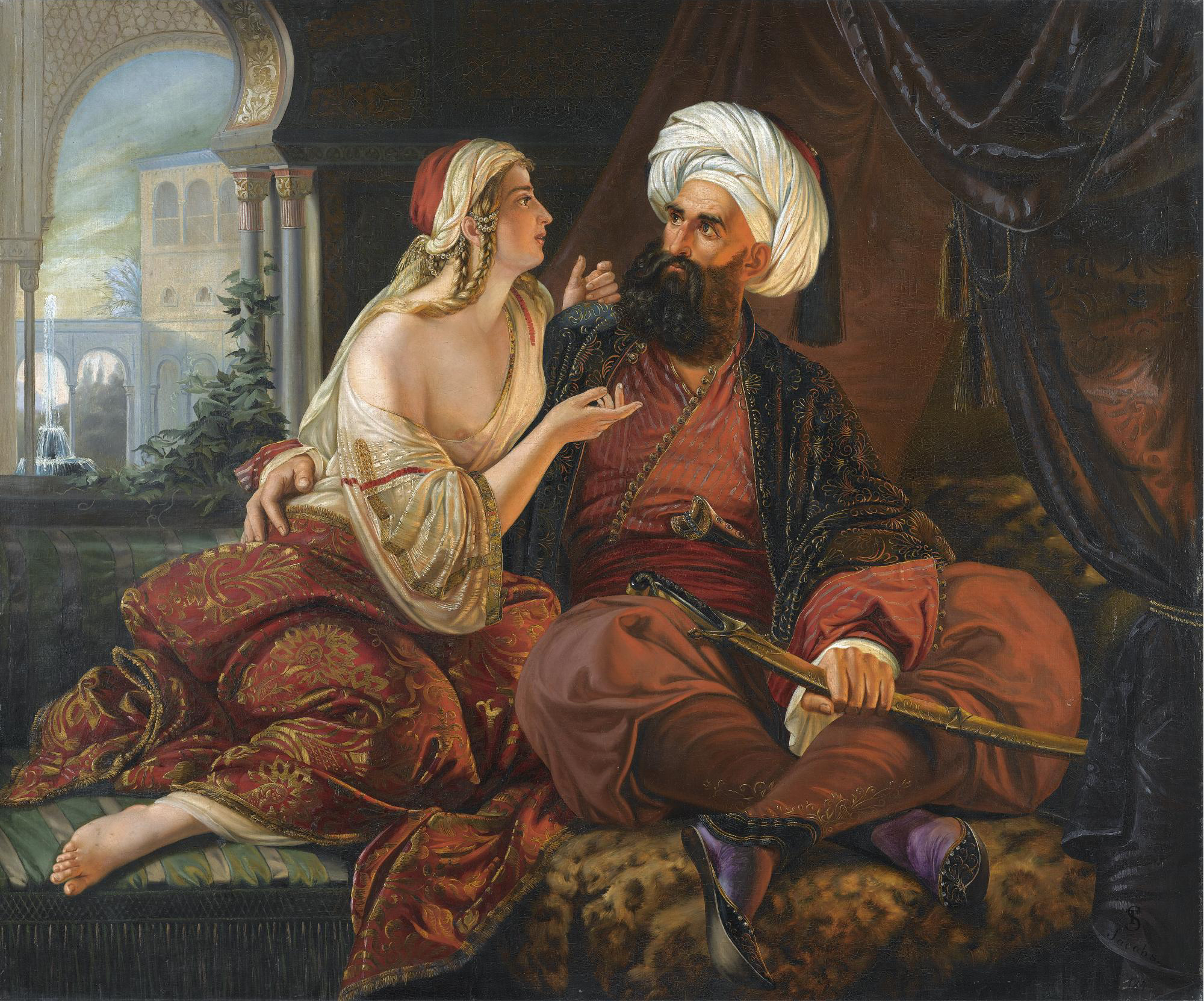
Paul Emil Jacobs' depiction of Ali Pasha and his favorite mistress (or wife) Kira Vassiliki – one of Jacobs' paintings depicting Orientalist themes

Jacobs, son of the philologist Frederick Jacobs, was born in Gotha. He received his art training at the Munich Academy of Fine Arts and first became known for his painting of Mercury and Argus (from Classical mythology). In 1824 he went to Rome, where he attracted critical attention by painting "The Raising of Lazarus". In 1836 he made a series of historical paintings at the Welfenschloss in Hannover.

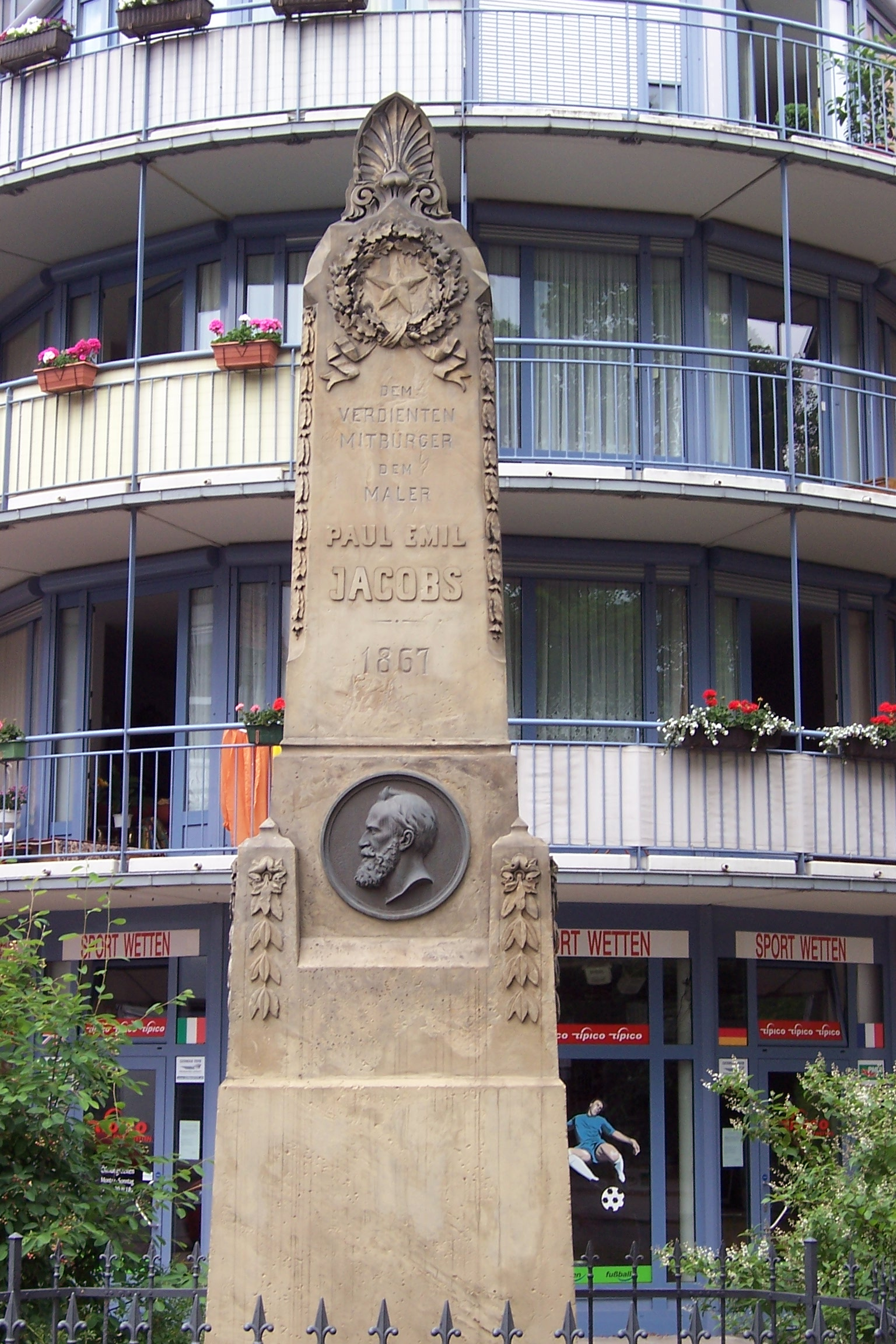
The Paul Emil Jacobs monument in Gotha

Jacobs was noted for his mastery of nudes, expressed particularly in the representation of such Orientalist themes as "A slave market" or of sleeping and waking naked boys.

Graceful depictions of the female body include his "A Harem Beauty At Her Toilette" and "Zither-playing Turk". His image of Scheherezade from Arabian Nights is noted for its light effects. The famous Ali Pasha was depicted by Jacobs in a moment of relaxed intimacy with his favorite mistress (or wife) Kira Vassiliki.

Like many Europeans of his generation, Jacobs shared in the Philhellene sympathy for the Greek War of Independence, which took place when he was in the early stage of his artistic career. This was manifested in his painting very sympathetic pictures of "Greek Freedom Fighters".

Jacobs was also a portrait painter. Lithographed portraits by him include those of Goethe, Karl Gottlieb Bretschneider and Döring.

In 1844, Jacobs created the monumental altarpiece "Calvary", for St. Augustine's Church in Gotha. It was removed from St. Augustine's in 1939, and since 1998 the altarpiece has been located in the church of Hohenleuben.

Jacobs was married to Louise Jahn, and his grandson Emil Jacobs (1868–1940) was a librarian and head of the library at the University of Freiburg.

== See also ==
- List of Orientalist artists
- Orientalism
