= Demographics of Saint Petersburg =

- Population pyramid of Saint Petersburg in 2021
- Population: 5,384,342 (2021)

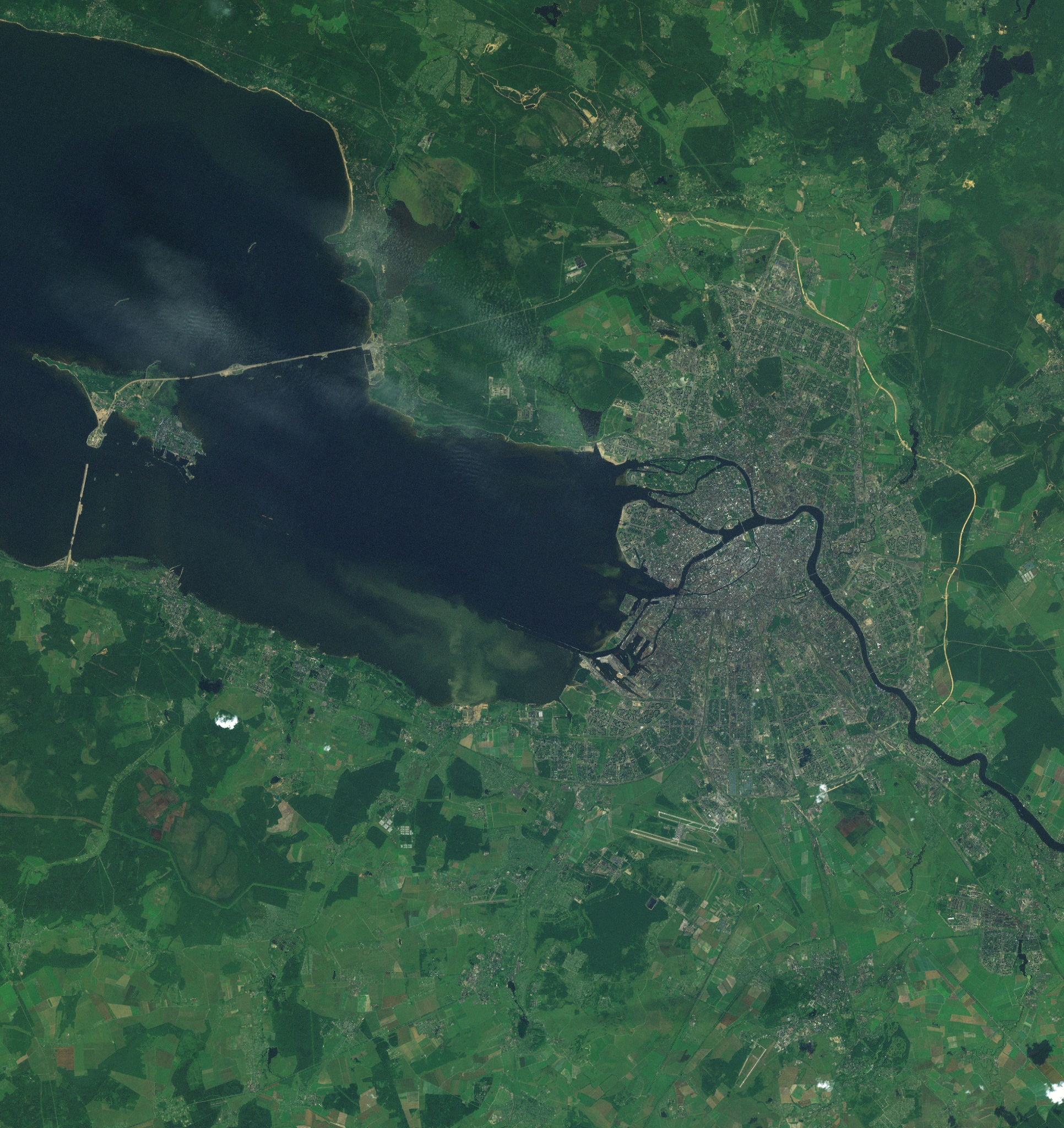
Satellite picture of St. Peterburg

Saint Petersburg is the second largest city in Russia, after Moscow and the fourth most populous city in Europe.

2002 census recorded population of the federal subject 4,661,219, or 3.21% of the total population of Russia. The city with its vicinity has an estimated population of about 6 million people. According to Rosstat, in 2021 the city's population is 5,384,342

== Ethnicity ==
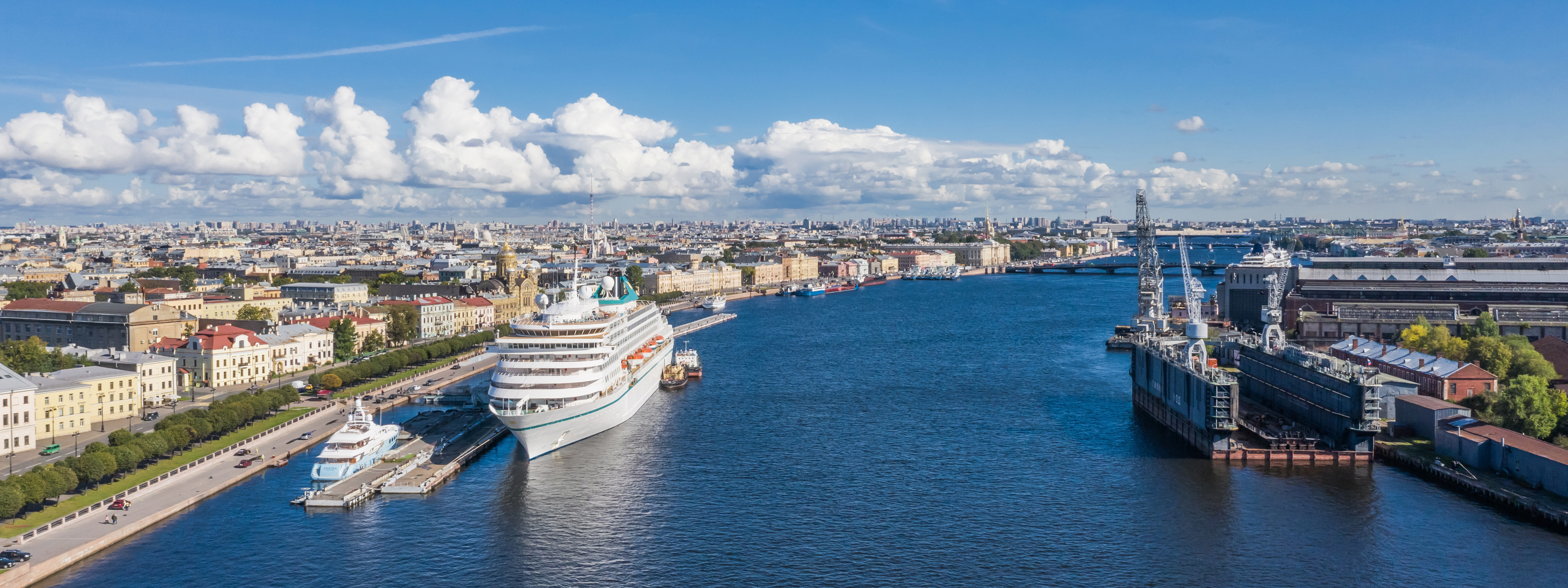
Panorama of St. Petersburg

The 2002 census recorded twenty-two ethnic groups of more than two thousand persons each. The ethnic composition was: Russian 84.72%; Ukrainian 1.87%; Belarusians 1.17%; Jewish 0.78%; Tatar 0.76%; Armenian 0.41%; Azeri 0.36%; Georgian 0.22%; Chuvash 0.13%; Polish 0.10%; Finnish 0.08%; Korean 0.08%; German 0.08%; Moldovan 0.07%; Mordovian 0.07%; Uzbek 0.06%; Kazakh 0.06%; Ossetian 0.06%; Bashkir 0.05%; Tajik 0.05%; Estonian 0.05%; Karelian 0.05%; Lithuanian 0.6%, and many other ethnic groups of less than two thousand persons each. 7.89% of the inhabitants declined to state their ethnicity. As of 2001, 41 percent of Petersburgers identified themselves as Russian Orthodox, another 21% called themselves Christians in general. Almost a half of both groups were at the same time self-reported non-believers. The number of churched parishioners of the Russian Orthodox Church are estimated as less than 5%.

Saint Petersburg has always been populated mostly by Russians, albeit with several sizeable ethnic minorities, such as Germans, Ukrainians, Finns, and people from Eastern Europe, among others. In 1800 an estimated 200 to 300 thousand people lived in the city. After the emancipation of serfs in 1861, former serfs started arriving to the capital as workers, boosting population from half a million to nearly 1.3 million as recorded in the census of 1897.

Ethnicity of Saint Petersburg over time
	1926 population.	%	1939 Population.	%	1959 Population.	%	1970 Population.	%	1979 Population.	%	1989 Population.	%	2002 Population.	%	% of the population who declared a ethnicity	2010 Population.	%	% of the population who declared a ethnicity
Total	1609816	100.00 %	3191304	100.00 %	3321196	100.00 %	3949501	100.00 %	4568548	100.00 %	4990749	100.00 %	4661219	100.00 %		4879566	100.00 %	
Russians	1386872	86.15 %	2775979	86.99 %	2951254	88.86 %	3514296	88.98 %	4097629	89.69 %	4448884	89.14 %	3949623	84.73 %	92.00 %	3908753	79.10 %	92.48 %
Ukrainians	10781	0.67 %	54660	1.71 %	68308	2.06 %	97109	2.46 %	117412	2.57 %	150982	3.03 %	87119	1.87 %	2.03 %	64446	1.32 %	1.52 %
Belarusians	14572	0.91 %	32353	1.01 %	47004	1.42 %	63799	1.62 %	81575	1.79 %	93564	1.87 %	54484	1.17 %	1.27 %	38136	0.78 %	0.90 %
Tatars	7321	0.45 %	31506	0.99 %	27178	0.82 %	32851	0.83 %	39403	0.86 %	43997	0.88 %	35553	0.76 %	0.83 %	30857	0.63 %	0.73 %
Jews	84480	5.25 %	201542	6.32 %	168641	5.08 %	162500	4.11 %	142730	3.12 %	106142	2.13 %	36570	0.78 %	0.85 %	24132	0.49 %	0.57 %
Uzbeks	103	0.01 %	238	0.01 %			1678	0.04 %	1883	0.04 %	7927	0.16 %	2987	0.06 %	0.07 %	20345	0.42 %	0.48 %
Armenians	1664	0.10 %	4615	0.14 %	4897	0.15 %	6628	0.17 %	7995	0.18 %	12070	0.24 %	19164	0.41 %	0.45 %	19971	0.41 %	0.47 %
Azerbaijanis			385	0.01 %	855	0.03 %	1576	0.04 %	3171	0.07 %	11804	0.24 %	16613	0.36 %	0.39 %	17717	0.36 %	0.42 %
Tajiks	3	0.01 %	61	0.00 %			361	0.01 %	473	0.01 %	1917	0.04 %	2449	0.05 %	0.06 %	12072	0.25 %	0.29 %
Georgians	588	0.04 %	1640	0.05 %	1917	0.06 %	3798	0.10 %	4363	0.10 %	7804	0.16 %	10104	0.22 %	0.24 %	8274	0.17 %	0.20 %
Moldovans	168	0.01 %	567	0.02 %	956	0.03 %	2467	0.06 %	2882	0.06 %	5390	0.11 %	3365	0.07 %	0.08 %	7200	0.15 %	0.17 %
Chuvash	1600	0.10 %	1778	0.06 %	1787	0.05 %	3465	0.09 %	6057	0.13 %	8994	0.18 %	6007	0.13 %	0.14 %	4610	0.09 %	0.11 %
Koreans	103	0.01 %	195	0.01 %			1361	0.03 %	2258	0.05 %	2962	0.06 %	3908	0.08 %	0.09 %	4031	0.08 %	0.10 %
Kazakhs			390	0.01 %	654	0.02 %	1562	0.04 %	2002	0.04 %	6331	0.13 %	2830	0.06 %	0.07 %	3349	0.07 %	0.08 %
Kyrgyz	37	0.00 %	49	0.00 %			306	0.01 %	453	0.01 %	2763	0.06 %	566	0.01 %	0.01 %	3289	0.07 %	0.08 %
Ossetians	277	0,02 %	955	0,03 %	917	0,03 %	1186	0,03 %	1741	0,04 %	2584	0,05 %	2836	0,06 %	0,07 %	3233	0,07 %	0,08 %
Germans	16916	1,05 %	10104	0,32 %	2052	0,06 %	3249	0,08 %	2802	0,06 %	3570	0,07 %	3868	0,08 %	0,09 %	2849	0,06 %	0,07 %
Lezgins	44	0,01 %	62	0,00 %			194	0,00 %	441	0,01 %	1448	0,03 %	1805	0,04 %	0,04 %	2814	0,06 %	0,07 %
Bashkirs	92	0,01 %	716	0,02 %	617	0,02 %	914	0,02 %	1749	0,04 %	3014	0,06 %	2453	0,05 %	0,06 %	2706	0,06 %	0,06 %
Poles	34027	2,11 %	20605	0,65 %	11662	0,35 %	10948	0,28 %	9607	0,21 %	7955	0,16 %	4451	0,10 %	0,10 %	2647	0,05 %	0,06 %
Finns	3940	0,24 %	7923	0,25 %	3150	0,09 %	4376	0,11 %	5719	0,13 %	5469	0,11 %	3980	0,09 %	0,09 %	2559	0,05 %	0,06 %
Mordva	313	0,02 %	3812	0,12 %	1857	0,06 %	2216	0,06 %	3765	0,08 %	5175	0,10 %	3369	0,07 %	0,08 %	2337	0,05 %	0,06 %
Avars	1	0,01 %					186	0,00 %	368	0,01 %	1205	0,02 %	1516	0,03 %	0,04 %	1971	0,04 %	0,05 %
Chinese	306	0,01 %	310	0,01 %			1451	0,04 %	66	0,00 %	93	0,00 %	1064	0,02 %	0,02 %	1578	0,03 %	0,04 %
Estonians	15847	0,98 %	15161	0,48 %	7350	0,22 %	6804	0,17 %	6237	0,14 %	5001	0,10 %	2266	0,05 %	0,05 %	1534	0,03 %	0,04 %
Chechens	14	0,01 %	40	0,00 %			209	0,01 %	384	0,01 %	1173	0,02 %	1685	0,04 %	0,04 %	1482	0,03 %	0,04 %
Turkmens	8	0,00 %	54	0,00 %			603	0,02 %	327	0,01 %	1360	0,03 %	793	0,02 %	0,02 %	1469	0,03 %	0,04 %
Karelians	494	0,03 %	2534	0,08 %	1972	0,06 %	2407	0,06 %	3194	0,07 %	3607	0,07 %	2142	0,05 %	0,05 %	1396	0,03 %	0,03 %
Lithuanians	5886	0,37 %	4721	0,15 %	2660	0,08 %	3262	0,08 %	2607	0,06 %	3314	0,07 %	1637	0,04 %	0,04 %	1294	0,03 %	0,03 %
Latvians	12046	0,75 %	9554	0,30 %	4564	0,14 %	4346	0,11 %	3971	0,09 %	3400	0,07 %	1705	0,04 %	0,04 %	1291	0,03 %	0,03 %
Buryats	66	0,01 %	139	0,00 %			272	0,01 %	627	0,01 %	1043	0,02 %	1152	0,02 %	0,03 %	1287	0,03 %	0,03 %
Kalmyks	28	0,00 %	40	0,00 %			107	0,00 %	269	0,01 %	442	0,01 %	551	0,01 %	0,01 %	1283	0,03 %	0,03 %
Karbardians	12	0,00 %	60	0,00 %			200	0,01 %	342	0,01 %	727	0,01 %	507	0,01 %	0,01 %	1181	0,02 %	0,03 %
Greeks	374	0,02 %	558	0,02 %			782	0,02 %	1065	0,02 %	1590	0,03 %	1448	0,03 %	0,03 %	1154	0,02 %	0,03 %
Udmurts			333	0,01 %			627	0,02 %	1155	0,03 %	2162	0,04 %	1265	0,03 %	0,03 %	1076	0,02 %	0,02 %
Komi	1069	0,03 %	1007	0,03 %	1153	0,03 %	1506	0,04 %	1650	0,04 %	2208	0,04 %	1455	0,03 %	0,03 %	1072	0,02 %	0,03 %
Mari	71	0,01 %	255	0,01 %			661	0,02 %	1138	0,02 %	1847	0,04 %	1288	0,03 %	0,03 %	1022	0,02 %	0,02 %
Turks	29	0,00 %	57	0,00 %			29	0,00 %	39	0,00 %	150	0,00 %	451	0,01 %	0,01 %	999	0,02 %	0,02 %
Kumyks	2	0,00 %	25	0,00 %			71	0,00 %	175	0,00 %	444	0,01 %	499	0,01 %	0,03 %	947	0,02 %	0,02 %
Dargins			11	0,00 %			131	0,00 %	172	0,00 %	611	0,01 %	729	0,02 %	0,02 %	946	0,02 %	0,02 %
Ingush	11	0,00 %	17	0,00 %			80	0,00 %	109	0,00 %	304	0,01 %	670	0,01 %	0,01 %	930	0,02 %	0,02 %
Arabs	4	0,00 %	7	0,00 %			404	0,01 %	184	0,00 %	526	0,01 %	1115	0,02 %	0,03 %	929	0,02 %	0,02 %
Roma	262	0,02 %	910	0,03 %			704	0,02 %	1471	0,03 %	1804	0,04 %	1278	0,03 %	0,03 %	890	0,02 %	0,02 %
Bulgarians	75	0,01 %	211	0,01 %			1029	0,03 %	731	0,02 %	1062	0,02 %	938	0,02 %	0,02 %	843	0,02 %	0,02 %
Abkhazians	7	0,00 %	51	0,00 %			165	0,00 %	363	0,00 %	632	0,01 %	864	0,02 %	0,02 %	783	0,02 %	0,02 %
Yakuts	20	0,00 %	70	0,00 %			214	0,01 %	787	0,02 %	862	0,02 %	847	0,02 %	0,02 %	701	0,01 %	0,02 %
Other	2913	0,07 %	4332	0,14 %	9781	0,29 %	6411	0,16 %	4981	0,11 %	10592	0,21 %	11254	0,24 %	0,26 %	12354	0,25 %	0,29 %
Stated an ethnicity	1609816	100,00 %	3190592	99,98 %	3321186	100,00 %			4568522	100,00 %	4986905	99,92 %	4293223	92,11 %	100,00 %	4226739	86,62 %	100,00 %
Did not state an ethnicity			712	0,02 %	10	0,00 %			26	0,00 %	3844	0,08 %	367996	7,89 %		652827	13,38 %	

== Population ==
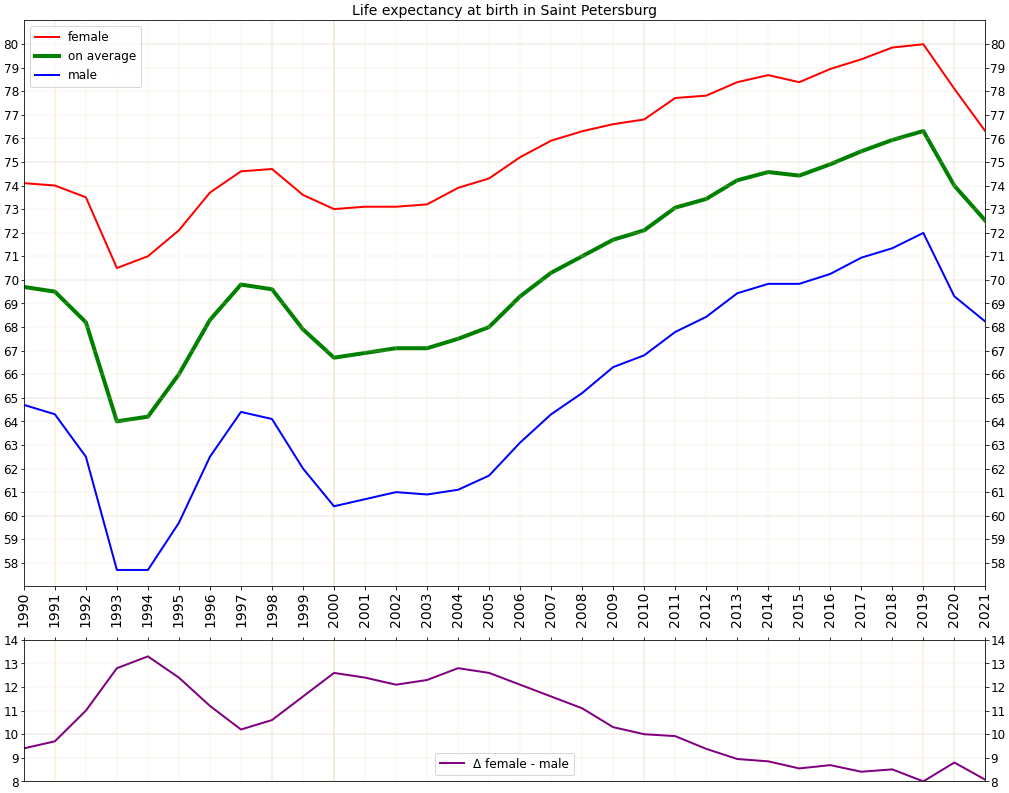
Life expectancy at birth in Saint Petersburg, with calculated gender difference

Number of population of Saint Petersburg

Throughout the three centuries the growth of St. Petersburg was accompanied by an increase in population of its surroundings, while the latter to the city were gradually incorporated into the city limits. From an administrative point of view these suburbs (Russian: пригороды, literally by the city) comprised a few uyezds adjacent to the city, holding an intermediate position between the gubernia (presently oblast) as the largest unit in Russia and the city of Petersburg as its center. A known confusion between the St. Petersburg / Petrograd / Leningrad Uezd (1727—1914—1924–1927; with a rural population of 56002 according to the census of 1897) and four districts (Russian: участки or части, literally plots or homesteads) referred to as suburbs (of Petershof, of Shlisselburg, of Polyustrovo and of Lesnoi; a total of 191491 inhabitants by 1900) may sometimes lead to a discrepancy between the statistical data taken from different sources, especially considering the fact that a suburban Tsarskoselsky Uezd (population around 150,000 in 1897) was excluded from district statistics.

In 1890–1891 the population figures for Petersburg crossed the boundary of 1 million. By 1900 the 38 'plots' comprising the 'city itself' had a population of 1,248,122 while the four abovenamed suburban districts counted 191,491 people.

In the 20th century the city experienced three major depopulation trends. The first one began in 1916 (estimates for this year show 2.4 million; this level was surpassed again in 1930–31). In addition to the February Revolution, the sharp deterioration in food supplies in the first months of 1917 caused the flood of certain segments of population to the rural areas of Russia. In 1918 Petrograd without suburbs counted 1,179,256 persons (a 40% decline to 1917), and in 1920 about 740 thousand (without troops garrisoned in the city). By that time mobilisations brought the remarkable preponderance of women over men: 100 to 72, not counting the troops.

The demobilisation after the end of the Civil War (1921), the industrial revival which followed the promulgation of New Economic Policy (March 21, 1921), resumption of the old and opening many new universities and especially colleges led to the increasing influx of population since 1921, in which younger generations formed a notable part. The first Five-Year Plans (1928–1930, 1931–1935 and 1936–1940) put the population growth upon the planned basis supported by a 'propiska' residencial quotas introduced at the beginning of the 1930s. In the years of industrialization in the USSR the influx of population was at the same time accompanied by the annual outflow of tens of thousands of college graduates and workers assigned to other locations of the country on the construction sites and in rural areas from where they came to study in Leningrad.

The German minority in Petersburg began to extinguish at the end of the 19th century (1890 – 4.6%, 1900 – 3.5%); this process accelerated in 1914 with the beginning of the First World War. The disintegration of the Russian Empire in 1917–1920 with the secession of Finland, Poland, Estonia, Latvia, Lithuania was followed by an outflow of Finns (in 1900 they counted 15638, or 1.3% of citizen), Poles (38314, or 3.1%), Estonians (13401, or 1.1%), Latvians (7097, or 0.6%) and Lithuanians (5666, or 0.4%). In 1939 the city has surpassed a 3-million mark, however the subsequent mobilisation to the Winter War (1939–40), the assignments of some part of both military and civilians onto the western territories of the USSR and to a certain extent, the Transfer of some Finns still remaining in Leningrad out of the border zone of the USSR stagnated the 3 million population level through the beginning of the Great Patriotic War in June 1941.

The impact of the siege of Leningrad is estimated as one of the longest, most destructive and costly in terms of casualties in human history. Before September 8, 1941 when the city was encircled 336,000 civilians were evacuated with the 86 city industrial enterprises that were dismantled and moved to Northern Russia and Siberia. From September 1941 through April 1942 659,000 civilians were evacuated mainly by watercraft and ice road over the Ladoga lake. From May through October 1942 another 403,000 people were evacuated mainly through the waterways of this lake. Some the people that were evacuated fled to the city from surrounding territory. Many would soon die after evacuation due to the previous months of starvation within the Siege of Leningrad. From September, 1941 to January, 1944 670,000 deaths were registered officially, resulting mostly from starvation, stress and exposure. In addition, German shelling and bombings killed 5,723 and wounded 20,507 civilians.

Statistics for 1944 show between 546,000 and 700,000 people survived. After the siege was lifted, the evacuees were allowed to return, but the main source of renewal of the population of Leningrad in the post-war years was the influx from another parts of the Soviet Union. Only in 1957–1958, or 18–19 years after 1939 when the 3-million citizen was born, the city managed to surpass this population mark again. 12 years later, in 1969–1970 the population reached 4 million, and in 1988–1989 — 5 million.

When the historical maximum was reached in 1990 (less than 5.1 million) the whole country teetered on the brink of political and economic collapse. The first year when the city has restored its original name, St. Petersburg (1991) was the first in the most lengthy period of the steady population reduction in the city's history. By 2003 the city population was less than 4.5 million, or at a level of 1977. Among the reasons of this demographic degradation was an increased death rate and decreasing birth rate, declined inflow of workers due to shutdowns of many of the city’s industries, increased emigration out of the country, closure of many military educational institutions. At the same time a certain inflow to the Leningrad Oblast (a region surrounding the city) in the 2000s was influenced with the migration from Russia and other ex Soviet Republics, the relocation of officers and their families from places of the overseas deployment of the Soviet Army. The relevant suburban housing construction was supported both with private and state funding. The long-term excess of deaths over births has brought a noticeable population ageing. The average age is about 40 years, and people of 65 years and older comprise more than 20% of the population, while the life expectancy in Russia has fallen under 60 years.

Periods of temporary economic recovery accompanied by an increase in demand for unskilled labor (road and construction workers, janitors, porters, drivers etc.) pose a problem of migrant workers under a new, unexpected angle. In the Soviet planned economy this demand was covered by the stable inflow of labourers from the central regions of Russia and the European Republics of the USSR. They were favored with both job and dwelling guarantees (initially housed in the dorms, after a certain period they received a new living space from the state). Now the labour sourcing geographical azimuth has changed to the ex republics of Caucasus, Middle Asia and Moldavia known by the lesser professional skill of newcomers. Apart from that, more and more labourers now migrate to St. Petersburg from the Far East and Turkey. It changes the labour market conditions for people from Russia and other ex-Soviet Republics, despite the fact that the latter were taught Russian language from their childhood.

The population of St.Petersburg in 1764–2003
years	thousands	years	thousands	years	thousands	years	thousands
1764	149,7	1911	1950,3	1942	2432,0	1973	4219,8
1765	150,3	1912	2035,6	1943	622,0	1974	4287,0
1770	158,8	1913	2124,6	1944	546,0	1975	4356,2
1775	166,1	1914	2217,5	1945	927,0	1976	4417,9
1780	174,8	1915	2314,5	1946	1541,0	1977	4471,3
1785	197,6	1916	2415,7	1947	1920,0	1978	4527,2
1790	218,2	1917	2300,0	1948	1998,0	1979	4588,2
1795	219,1	1918	1469,0	1949	2218,0	1980	4635,2
1800	220,2	1919	900,0	1950	2258,0	1981	4669,4
1805	252,8	1920	740,0	1951	2328,0	1982	4711,2
1810	291,0	1921	830,0	1952	2403,0	1983	4762,1
1815	340,0	1922	960,0	1953	2459,0	1984	4806,4
1820	385,4	1923	1093,0	1954	2765,0	1985	4844,2
1825	424,7	1924	1221,0	1955	2797,0	1986	4882,2
1830	435,5	1925	1379,0	1956	2814,0	1987	4931,2
1835	452,0	1926	1535,0	1957	2816,0	1988	4986,9
1840	472,8	1927	1627,0	1958	3333,6	1989	5023,5
1845	480,0	1928	1700,1	1959	3389,6	1990	5035,2
1850	487,3	1929	1827,8	1960	3432,0	1991	5034,7
1855	513,0	1930	2009,5	1961	3524,5	1992	5003,8
1860	506,6	1931	2372,5	1962	3594,9	1993	4952,3
1865	539,1	1932	2684,3	1963	3663,9	1994	4882,6
1870	682,3	1933	2668,0	1964	3731,6	1995	4838,0
1875	758,4	1934	2715,9	1965	3777,2	1996	4801,5
1880	843,1	1935	2715,7	1966	3813,5	1997	4778,6
1885	884,3	1936	2728,5	1967	3867,0	1998	4748,5
1890	954,4	1937	2814,5	1968	3925,1	1999	4728,2
1895	1097,5	1938	2946,7	1969	3983,1	2000	4694,0
1900	1418,0	1939	3015,2	1970	4026,8	2001	4660,6
1905	1635,1	1940	2920,0	1971	4083,4	2002	4629,0
1910	1881,3	1941	2992,0	1972	4149,9	2003	4597,6
Source: И.И.Елисеева, Е.И.Грибова, ed. (2003). Санкт-Петербург. 1703-2003: Jubilee Statistical Yearbook [Saint Petersburg. 1703-2003] (2 ed.). СПб: Судостроение. pp. 16–17.

In 2020 the pandemic of COVID-19 was accompanied by a drop in birth rate, and the city population decreased to 5 mln 395.2 thousand people, according to the city government economics authority.

== Housing ==
People in urban Saint Petersburg mostly live in apartment blocks. Between 1918 and 1990s, the Soviets nationalised housing and many were forced to share their apartments as communal apartments (kommunalkas) with other residents of the city. In the 1930s, some 68 percent of the Leningrad population lived in shared apartments. Leningrad was the largest city of the Soviet Union by the number of kommunalkas. As new boroughs were built on the outskirts in the 1950s-1980s, over half a million low-income families eventually received free apartments, and additional hundred thousand condos were purchased by the middle class. Today, economic and social activity remains concentrated in and around the city centre, which is the richest part of the city; the new boroughs have mostly served a commuter area function, with people living in large multi-storied apartment blocks and travelling to and from the city centre for work. Their gentrification has yet to begin. Although progress has been made in resettling residents of kommunalkas in the 1990s, shared apartments are still not uncommon. In the last 15 years of de-nationalisation, most of the residential property has been transferred free of charge, or at a small fraction of its value, to millions of legal residents of St. Petersburg.

== See also ==
- Demographics of Russia
