= Keeran =

Keeran may refer to:

- Keeran (Tamil name)
- Keeran, a spelling variant of the Celtic name Ciarán
- Charles Rood Keeran (1883–1948), American inventor and businessman
- Roger Keeran (born 1944), American academic historian
- Keeran, County Fermanagh, a townland in Derryvullan, County Fermanagh, Northern Ireland

== See also ==
- Kiran (given name), an unrelated Indian given name
- Keeranur (disambiguation)
