= Raki =

Raki may refer to:

== Liquors ==
- Raki / Rakia (with a dotted "i"), fruit-based spirits in several countries in southeast Europe
- Rakı (with a dotless "ı"), an anise-flavored spirit popular in Turkey, similar to ouzo

== People and characters ==
- Laya Raki (1927–2018), German dancer and actress
- Raki Aouani (born 2004), Tunisian soccer player
- Raquel "Raki" Martin, a competitor on 2013 Gran Hermano (Spanish season 14)
- Raki (Claymore), a fictional character, from the manga/anime series Claymore
- Livy Raki (イェスパー・リヴェ・ラキ, Yesupā Rive Raki), a fictional character, from the Japanese light novel series Dances with the Dragons
- Raki, a mythological figure, an alternative name for Rangi, the Sky Father in the South Island dialect of Māori
- Raki, the Dog King, a mythological figure from Norse mythology; see List of named animals and plants in Germanic heroic legend

== Places ==
- Raki, Iran; a village
- Raki, Masovian Voivodeship, Poland; a village

== See also ==
- Ra Ki (disambiguation)
- Rakhi (disambiguation)
- Reiki (era), an era of Japanese history
- Reiki, a type of energy therapy
- Rakis, or Arrakis, a fictional planet in the Dune series of novels
