= Cyra =

Cyra may refer to:

- Cyra (beetle), a genus of ladybird beetles
- Cyra (name), a feminine given name
- Saint Cyra, Irish saint
- CYRA, the IATA code for Gamètì/Rae Lakes Airport in Canada
