= Kiran (given name) =

- Gender: Unisex
- Language: Sanskrit

Origin
- Meaning: "Ray of sun"
- Region of origin: Nepal, India, Pakistan

Other names
- Related names: Ciarán, Ciaran, Kieran, Kyran, Keiron, Kieron, Keiren, Kieren, Keiran, Kiran, Keeran

Kiran (Devanagari: किरण) is a Nepali or Indian given name. It originates in the Sanskrit word kiraṇa, meaning "ray" or "ray of light" or "beam of light". Other names that sound like Kiran are Kira, Kirwan, Ciaran, Keiran and Kieran. Notable people with the name include:

- Kiran Abbavaram (born 1992), Indian actor
- Kiran Ahluwalia (born 1965), Indian-Canadian singer
- Kiran Amegadjie, American football player
- Kiran Bechan (born 1982), Dutch footballer
- Kiran Bedi (born 1949), Indian social activist
- Kiran Chemjong (born 1990), Nepali footballer
- Kiran Chetry (born 1974), American television journalist
- Kiran Desai (born 1971), Indian author
- Kiran George (born 2000), Indian badminton player
- Kiran Gurung, Nepalese politician
- Kiran Juneja (born 1964), Indian actress
- Kiran Kedlaya (born 1974), Indian-American mathematician
- Kiran Khan (swimmer) (born 1990), Pakistani swimmer
- Kiran Kher (born 1955), Indian actress
- Kiran Kumar (born 1953), Indian actor
- Kiran Kumar Reddy (born 1960), Indian politician, Chief Minister of Andhra Pradesh
- Kiran Martin (born 1959), Indian social worker
- Kiran Mazumdar-Shaw (born 1953), Indian entrepreneur
- Kiran More (born 1962), Indian cricketer
- Kiran Nagarkar (1942–2019), Indian writer and critic
- Kiran Powar (born 1976), Indian cricketer
- Kiran Rao (born 1973), Indian film producer
- Kiran Rathod (born 1981), Indian actress
- Kiran Sethi (born 1967), Indian police officer
- Kiran Shah (born 1956), Kenyan actor
- Usha Kiran Khan (1945-2024), Indian historian

== Fictional characters ==
- Kiran, the default player name in the video game Fire Emblem Heroes
- Kiran, the title character in the Pakistani television serial Kiran, portrayed by Marjan Fatima
- Kiranmala, heroine of a homonymous Bengali folktale

== See also ==
- Ciarán, an Irish male given name, sometimes spelled Kiran
- Kiran (disambiguation)
