= Kyra =

Kyra may refer to:

== Places ==
- Kyra, Cyprus, a village
- Kyra, Russia, a rural locality (selo) in Zabaykalsky Krai
- Kyra River, a river in Kyra, Russia

== Given name ==
- Kyra (given name)
- Kyra (Charmed), a fictional character in the TV series Charmed
- Kyra, a major character in the film The Chronicles of Riddick
- Kyra, a character in the 2024 Indian sci-fi film Kalki 2898 AD, portrayed by Anna Ben

== Insects ==
- Kyra (genus), a genus of leafhoppers in the subfamily Deltocephalinae
- Kyra, a former snout moth genus of the Phycitini, now synonymized with Eurhodope

== Other uses ==
- KAIV, a radio station (92.7 FM) licensed to serve Thousand Oaks, California, United States, which held the call sign KYRA from 2023 to 2025

== See also ==
- Kira (disambiguation)
