= Kira =

Kira may refer to:

== People ==
- Kira clan, a Japanese clan, descended from Emperor Seiwa (850–880)
- Kira (given name), including a list of people with the given name
- Kira Chikazane (1563–1588), Japanese retainer
- Kira (German singer) (Janine Scholz, born 1978)
- Kira (Belgian singer) (Natasja de Witte, born 1977)
- Kira, uploader of pictures in the Edison Chen photo scandal, named after the Death Note character
- Matúš Kira, Slovak football goalkeeper
- Kira (wrestler) (born 2003), Mexican professional wrestler
- Kira Kimura (born 2004), Japanese snowboarder
- Daiya Kira (born 2003), Japanese boxer

== Fictional characters ==
- Kira (given name)#Fictional characters, including a list of fictional characters with the given name
- Izuru Kira, in the manga and anime series Bleach
- Kira Nerys, in the television Star Trek: Deep Space Nine
- Kira Yoshikage, in the manga and anime series JoJo's Bizarre Adventure
- Sakuya Kira, in the manga series Angel Sanctuary
- Tsubasa Kira, in the anime television series Love Live!
- Kira, an alias of Light Yagami in the manga and anime series Death Note

== Places ==
- Kira, Aichi, Japan
- Kirən or Kira, Azerbaijan
- Kira, Burkina Faso
- Kira Rural LLG, Papua New Guinea
- Kira Town, Uganda
- Kira (crater), on the far side of the Moon

== Other uses ==
- Kira (Bhutan), the national dress for women in Bhutan
- Kira (title), for women who acted on behalf of the Imperial Harem of the Ottoman Empire
- Kira Institute, a non-profit organization

== See also ==
- Ki Ra
- Kira Kira (disambiguation)
- Keira (disambiguation)
- Kiera, a given name
- Kirra (disambiguation)
- Kyra (disambiguation)
- Ciara (given name)
