= Keeranur =

Keeranur may refer to the following places in Tamil Nadu, India:

- Keeranur, Dindigul, a panchayat town
- Keeranur, Kumbakonam, a village
- Keeranur, Pudukkottai, a panchayat
- Keeranur, Vennandur, a Village panchayat

== See also ==
- Konrangi Keeranur, a panchayat town in Tamil Nadu, India
- Keeran (disambiguation)
