= Ra Ki =

Ra Ki or Ki Ra could refer to:

- Ra. Ki. Rangarajan (1927–2012), a Tamil author.
- Ra-Ki, a fictional character in the Guilty Gear video game
- Ki. Rajanarayanan, a Tamil author sometimes known as "Ki Ra"
- Kira (given name), evolved to the Persian and Egyptian word Ki-Ra for "like Ra, the sun"

== See also ==
- Ra (disambiguation)
- Ki (disambiguation)
- Raki (disambiguation)
- Kira (disambiguation)
