= Doring =

Doring may refer to:

== Places ==
- Doring, Bhutan, a town in Bhutan
- Doring Chima, a.k.a. Lhasa Zhol Pillar, a stone pillar in Tibet
- Doring River, a river in South Africa
- Olifants/Doring River, a river system in South Africa
- Riet River (Doring), a river in South Africa
- Doring River Dam, a dam in South Africa

== People ==
- Danny Doring and Roadkill, a professional wrestling tag team
- Doring Rijkers, a.k.a. Dorus Rijkers (1847–1928), Dutch lifeboat captain and folk hero
- Denise Doring VanBuren, American civic leader
- Döring (surname)
