= Rakhi =

Rakhi or Rakhee may refer to:

== Film and television ==
- Rakhi (1949 film), a Hindi film of 1949
- Rakhi (1962 film), an Indian Hindi-language drama directed by A. Bhimsingh
- Rakhi (2006 film), an Indian Telugu-language film directed by Krishna Vamsi
- Rakhi (TV series), a 2007–2009 Indian drama serial

== People ==
=== Given name ===
- Rakhee Gulzar (also known as Raakhee) (born 1947), Indian Bollywood actress
- Rakhee Morzaria, Canadian actress
- Rakhee Sandilya, Indian writer and documentary filmmaker
- Rakhee Tandon (actress), Indian actress
- Rakhee Kapoor Tandon (born 1986), Indian entrepreneur and venture capitalist
- Rakhee Thakrar (born 1984), English actress
- Rakhi Birla (born 1987), Indian politician
- Rakhi Pancholi (born 1977/1978), Canadian politician
- Rakhi Sawant (born 1978), Indian model and actress

=== Surname ===
- Mahbuba Islam Rakhi (born 1993), Bangladeshi actress and model

== Other uses ==
- Rakhi, Nepal, a town in Nepal
- Rakhi system, an 18th-century payment-for-protection scheme practiced by the Dal Khalsa of the Sikh Confederacy
- Raksha Bandhan, or Rakhi, an annual Hindu ceremony, and a type of bracelet associated with the ceremony

== See also ==
- Rahki, Columbus Smith III, American record producer
- Raki (disambiguation)
