= Kirra =

Kirra may refer to:

- Kirra, Phocis, village in Greece
- Kirra, Queensland, Queensland, coastal suburb and surf break

== See also ==
- Kiera, a given name
- Kira (disambiguation)
