= Kiran, Republic of Buryatia =

Kiran Киран
- Selo
- Location within Republic of Buryatia Location within Russia
- Coordinates: 50°20′N 106°42′E
- Country: Russia
- Region: Republic of Buryatia
- District: Kyakhtinsky District
- Time zone: UTC+8:00

Kiran (Russian: Киран; Buryat: Хираан, Khiraan) is a rural locality (a selo) in Kyakhtinsky District, Republic of Buryatia, Russia. The population was 187 as of 2010. There are 2 streets.

== Geography ==
Kiran is located 28 km east of Kyakhta (the district's administrative centre) by road. Kurort Kiran is the nearest rural locality.
