= Doring, Bhutan =

Doring
- Location in Bhutan
- Coordinates: 27°12′N 89°12′E
- Country: Bhutan
- District: Haa District
- Time zone: UTC+6 (BTT)

Doring is a town in Haa District in southwestern Bhutan.
