= Kyla =

Kyla may refer to:

- Kyla (given name), including a list of people with the name
  - Kyla (Filipino singer) (born 1981), Filipino R&B singer
    - Kyla (album), 2002
  - Kyla (British singer) (born 1983), British house music singer
- KYLA, an FM radio station
