= Kyra Sundance =

American dog trainer (born 1970)

- Born: July 20, 1970 (age 54); Orange County, California
- Occupation(s): Dog trainer, Author
- Employer: Do More With Your Dog!
- Known for: 101 Dog Tricks
- Website: Kyra's Official Website

Kyra Sundance (born July 20, 1970 in Orange County, California) is a dog trainer, performer, and author.

Sundance and her Weimaraners perform live acrobatic shows, and have appeared at professional sports halftime shows, and on television shows including The Tonight Show, Ellen, ET, Worldwide Fido Awards, Animal Planet's Pet Star, Showdog Moms & Dads, and Disney’s Underdog stage show at the El Capitan theater in Hollywood. Sundance and her dogs performed a command performance in Marrakech for the King of Morocco.

Before her performing career, Sundance was active in competitive dog sports, earning titles in Obedience, Agility, and Hunting. She also works as a set trainer for dog actors on sets such as Beverly Hills Chihuahua 2 and My Dog Ate What.

Sundance's first book, 101 Dog Tricks, has been translated into 15 languages. She lives with her husband on a ranch in California’s Mojave Desert.

Sundance is the founder of Do More With Your Dog!, the official sanctioning and organizing body for the sport of Dog Tricks.

== Bibliography ==
- 101 Dog Tricks NY Times Bestseller (Quarry Books, 2007)
- The Joy of Dog Training (Quarry Books, 2020)
- Kyra's Canine Conditioning (Quarry Books, 2018)
- Dog Training 101 (Quarry Books, 2017)
- 51 Puppy Tricks (Quarry Books, 2009)
- The Dog Tricks and Training Workbook (Quarry Books, 2009)
- 101 Ways to Do More With Your Dog! (Quarry Books, 2010)
- 10-Minute Dog Training Games (Quarry Books, 2011)
- The Dog Rules (Simon & Schuster, 2008)

== DVDs ==
- Best of 101 Dog Tricks, DVD, 2009
- Best Puppy Tricks, DVD, 2009
