= Keeran (Tamil name) =

Male given name

Keeran is a male given name of Tamil origin.

In ancient Tamil (Centamil, செந்தமிழ்), Keeran (கீரன்) means 'stands by his principles' in context of persons. Many people use the name Keeran as it is both English (when spelled differently) and Tamil.
