= Kirakira =

Kirakira, Kira Kira, or Kira-Kira may refer to:

== Arts, entertainment and media ==
- Kira-Kira, a young adult novel by Cynthia Kadohata
- Kirakira (video game), a 2007 video game

== Places ==
- Kira Kira, Papua New Guinea, a village that is part of Port Moresby, PNG
- Kirakira, Solomon Islands, the provincial capital of the Makira-Ulawa Province in Solomon Islands

== Songs ==
- "Kira Kira" (Ai song), a 2017 single by Ai
- "Kira Kira" (Beni song), 2009
- "Kira Kira/Akari", a 2015 single by Every Little Thing

== Culture ==
- Kira kira name, a term for a modern Japanese given name that has an atypical pronunciation or meaning.

== See also ==
- Kirakira * Pretty Cure a la Mode, a Japanese anime series
