= Kyra Vassiliki =

Spouse of Ali Pasha of Yanina

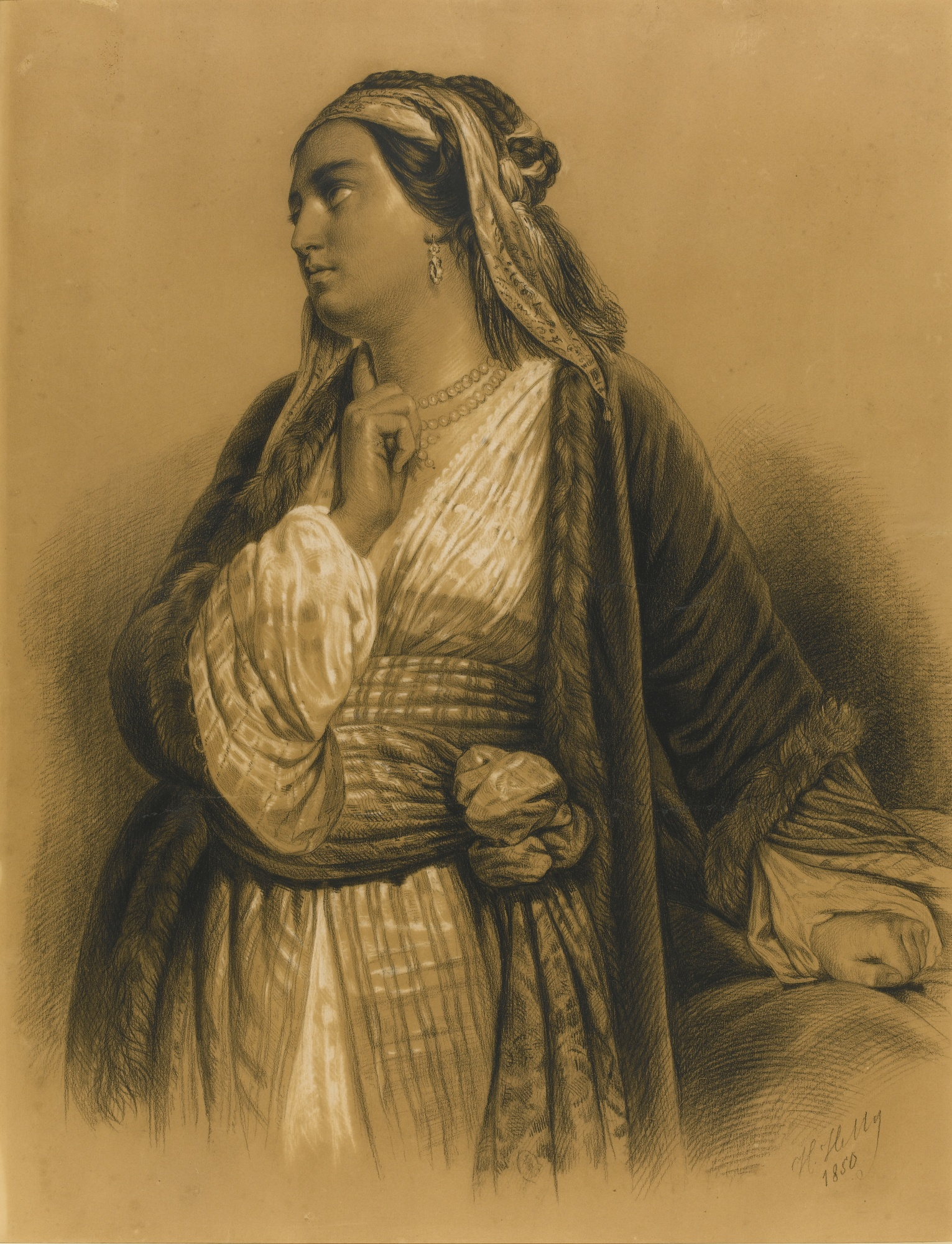
Portrait of Kyra Vassiliki, 1850

Vassiliki Kontaxi, nicknamed Kyra Vassiliki (Greek: Κυρά Βασιλική, Lady Vassiliki, c. 1789–1834), was an ethnic Greek woman brought up in the seraglio of the Ottoman ruler Ali Pasha.

== Life ==
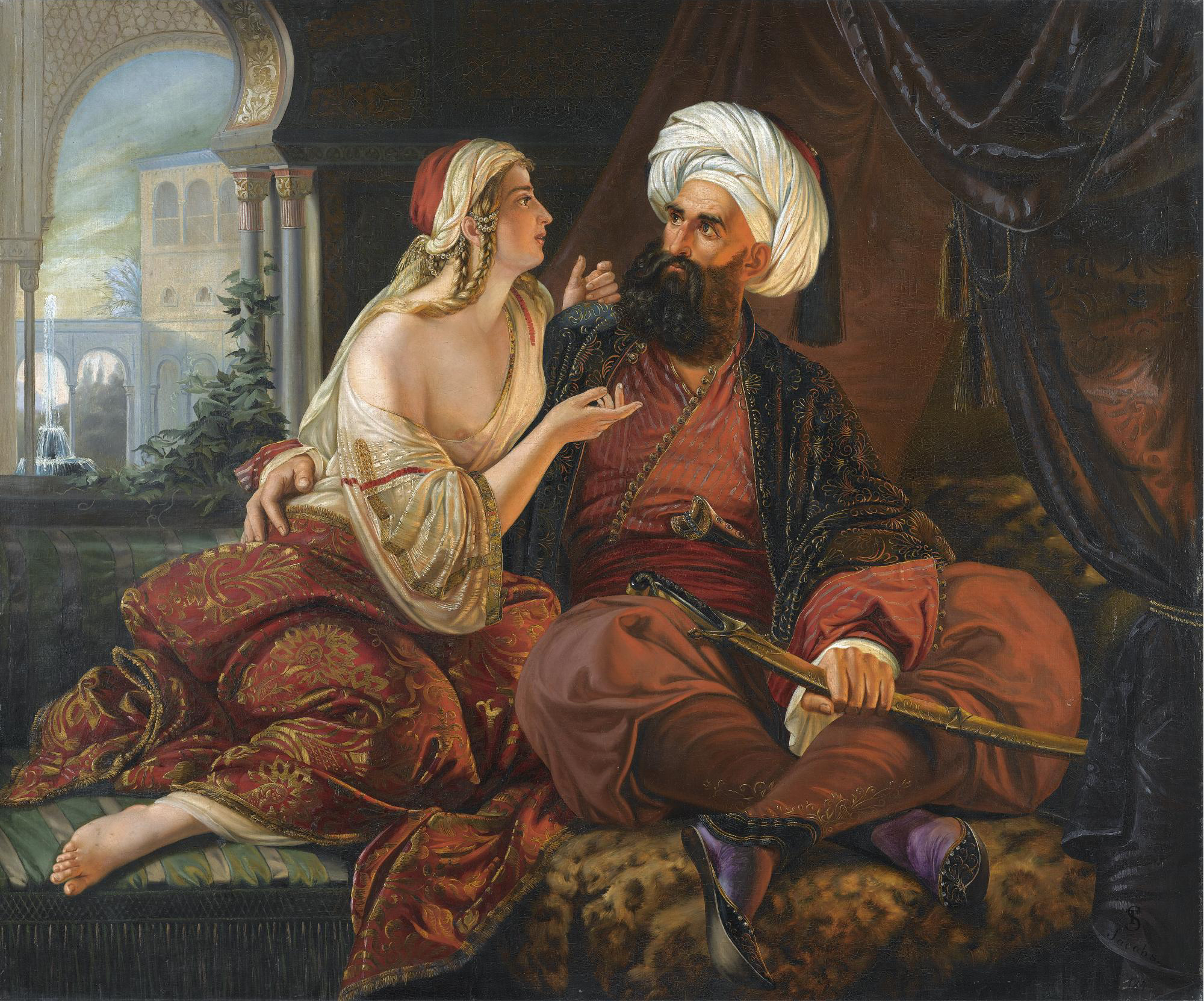
Kyra Vassiliki and Ali Pasha, school of Paul Emil Jacobs, 1844

Vassiliki Kontaxi was born in the Greek village of Plisivitsa in Thesprotia. At the age of twelve she sought an audience with the local Ottoman ruler, Ali Pasha, to intercede for her father's life. Having granted her father pardon, Ali Pasha married Vassiliki in 1808 and she joined his harem. Being allowed to practice her Christian faith, she interceded on behalf of the Orthodox people. She was perhaps contacted by the Greek patriotic organization Filiki Eteria. During this period she undertook a number of charity initiatives. In 1819–20 she financed a number of restoration works in Mount Athos.

In January 1822, during the last stage of the siege of Ioannina by the Ottoman Sultan's forces, Vassiliki together with Ali Pasha and his private guard escaped to Ioannina Island. Ali Pasha was executed there on January 22 by an Ottoman delegation, having been declared an outlaw by the Sultan. Following Ali's death, Vassiliki was sent as a prisoner to the Ottoman capital, Constantinople. She was later pardoned and returned to Greece, which meanwhile gained its independence after the successful Greek War of Independence (1821–30). In 1830, the Greek state gave Vassiliki a medieval tower in Katochi, where she lived the rest of her life. She died of dysentery in 1834.

== In art and literature ==
In 1895, the gold-embroidered velvet purse of Vassiliki was bought by Nikolaos Konstantinidis for 25 drachmas. Vassiliki was depicted by various artists. She is mentioned in a number of 19th-century novels, such as in Alexandre Dumas' The Count of Monte Cristo and by English author Richard A. Davenport in his The Life of Ali Pasha of Tepeleni, Vizier of Epirus.
