= Cyra (name) =

- Pronunciation: Sy-ra, See-ra
- Gender: Female
- Language: English, Persian, Greek,

Origin
- Languages: English, Persian, Greek
- Origin: English name
- Meaning: Throne, Lord, Sun.

Other names
- Related names: Kyra The common variations of the name Cyra include Cira (English, Russian, Japanese), Kira (English, Russian), Kyra (Russian, Japanese, English), Kyrah (Russian, Japanese), and Kiera (Irish).

Cyra (English name) is a feminine given name and surname.

The name "Cyra" is often considered a feminine form or variation of the name "Cyrus." While "Cyrus" has its origins in ancient Persia and is historically associated with the Achaemenid kings, "Cyra" appears to have been adapted or created as a feminine version of the name, particularly in English-speaking cultures.

People with the name include:

- Saint Cyra, early Irish abbess
- Cyra McFadden (born 1937), American writer
- Cyra Noavek, character from Veronica Roth's Carve the Mark
- Adam Cyra (born 1949), Polish historian
