= Kiran Martin =

Indian social worker

Dr Kiran Martin
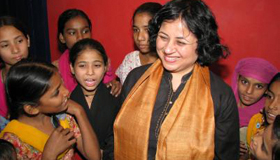
- Dr Kiran Martin
- Born: 9 June 1959 (age 67)
- Education: Bachelor of Medicine and Bachelor of Surgery, Diploma in Child Health and Paedriatics
- Occupations: Social worker, pediatrician, founder and director of Asha Society
- Spouse: Godfrey Martin
- Children: 2
- Awards: Padma Shri
- Website: Personal blog

Kiran Martin is an Indian paediatrician and social worker. She is the founder of Asha Society, a Delhi-based non-governmental organisation focused on health, education, and community development in urban slum areas. In 2002, she was awarded the Padma Shri, India’s fourth-highest civilian honour, for her contributions to community health.

== Early life ==
Martin did her graduate studies in Medicine (MBBS) at the Maulana Azad Medical College, Delhi and completed her advanced studies in pediatrics from the Lady Hardinge Medical College of the University of Delhi in 1985.

== Asha Society ==
In 1988, during a cholera outbreak in Dr. Ambedkar Basti in South Delhi, Martin volunteered to provide medical assistance to residents. The experience led her to establish Asha Society later that year to improve healthcare and living conditions in urban slum communities.

Since its inception, Asha has developed programmes in primary healthcare, sanitation, education, and financial inclusion. The organisation has established local women’s groups known as Mahila Mandals to advocate for community development and infrastructure improvements, and trained Community Health Volunteers to promote basic healthcare and health awareness at the community level.

Children’s groups, or Bal Mandals, were also created to encourage participation of young people in community activities. Asha supports access to higher education for young residents from slum settlements and collaborates with financial institutions to promote inclusion and provide access to banking and credit facilities for low-income families.

Independent studies by organisations such as UN-Habitat and the Nossal Institute for Global Health have documented Asha’s community development approach and its work across multiple slum colonies in Delhi.

=== International interest in Asha ===
Martin is associated with various philanthropic organizations in India and abroad for raising funds for her activities. Asha's work is supported by formal and registered Friends of Asha societies in Great Britain, Australia, Ireland and the USA. In addition, funding agencies such as Tearfund New Zealand, Tear Netherlands and ICCO Netherlands support Asha's work, alongside international governmental agencies such as Irish Aid, NZ Aid, the Japanese government's GGP programme and AusAid.

Among the notable visitors to have visited Asha and accompanied Martin on slum visits include the prime minister of New Zealand, John Key, Australia's prime minister, Julia Gillard in 2012, Denmark prime minister, Lars Løkke Rasmussen, the governor general of New Zealand, Anand Satyanand, the governor of Victoria, Alex Chernov, the first lady of Canada, Sharon Johnston, the first lady of Japan, Miyuki Hatoyama.

Martin has addressed gatherings at the British House of Commons, United States House of Representatives, Harvard University, MIT, Cambridge University, Boston University School of Public Health, Columbia University, Monash University, Melbourne University,University of Sydney the Australia India Institute. Queen's University Belfast, Radio New Zealand, Australian Broadcasting Corporation and Doordarshan aired a public address of Martin.

== Awards and recognition ==
Martin receiving the Padma Shri award, 2002

The Government of India, included her in the Republic Day honours list, in 2002, for the civilian award of Padma Shri. Martin worked with P Chidambaram, India's Home Minister and earlier the Finance Minister, to increase financial inclusion for slum dwellers.

Asha's work was awarded Best Practice by UN-Habitat. The Nossal Institute of Global Health, in 2011, published Asha: Hope and Transformation in the Slums of Delhi.

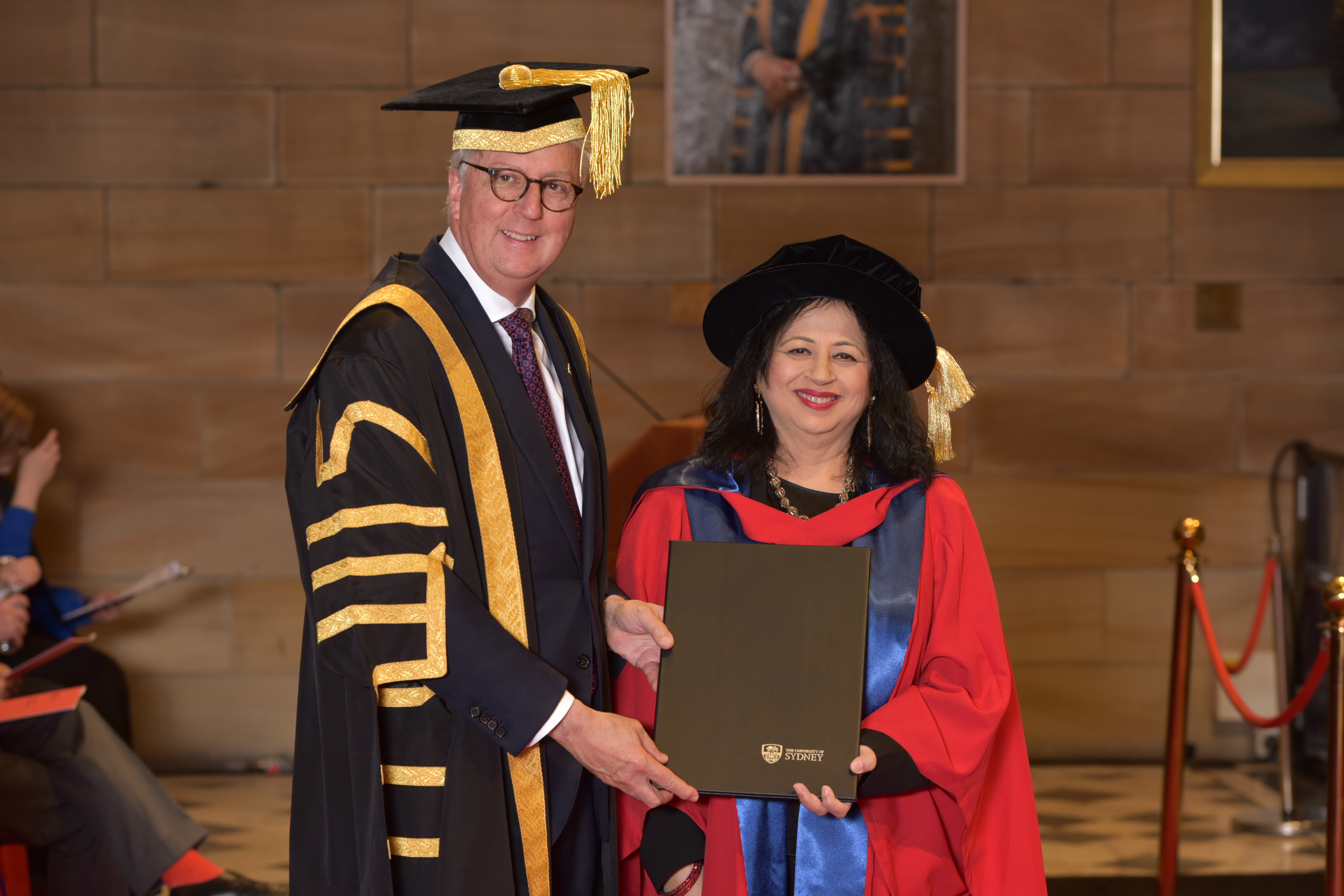
Martin honored with Doctor of Letters by University of Sydney, 2023

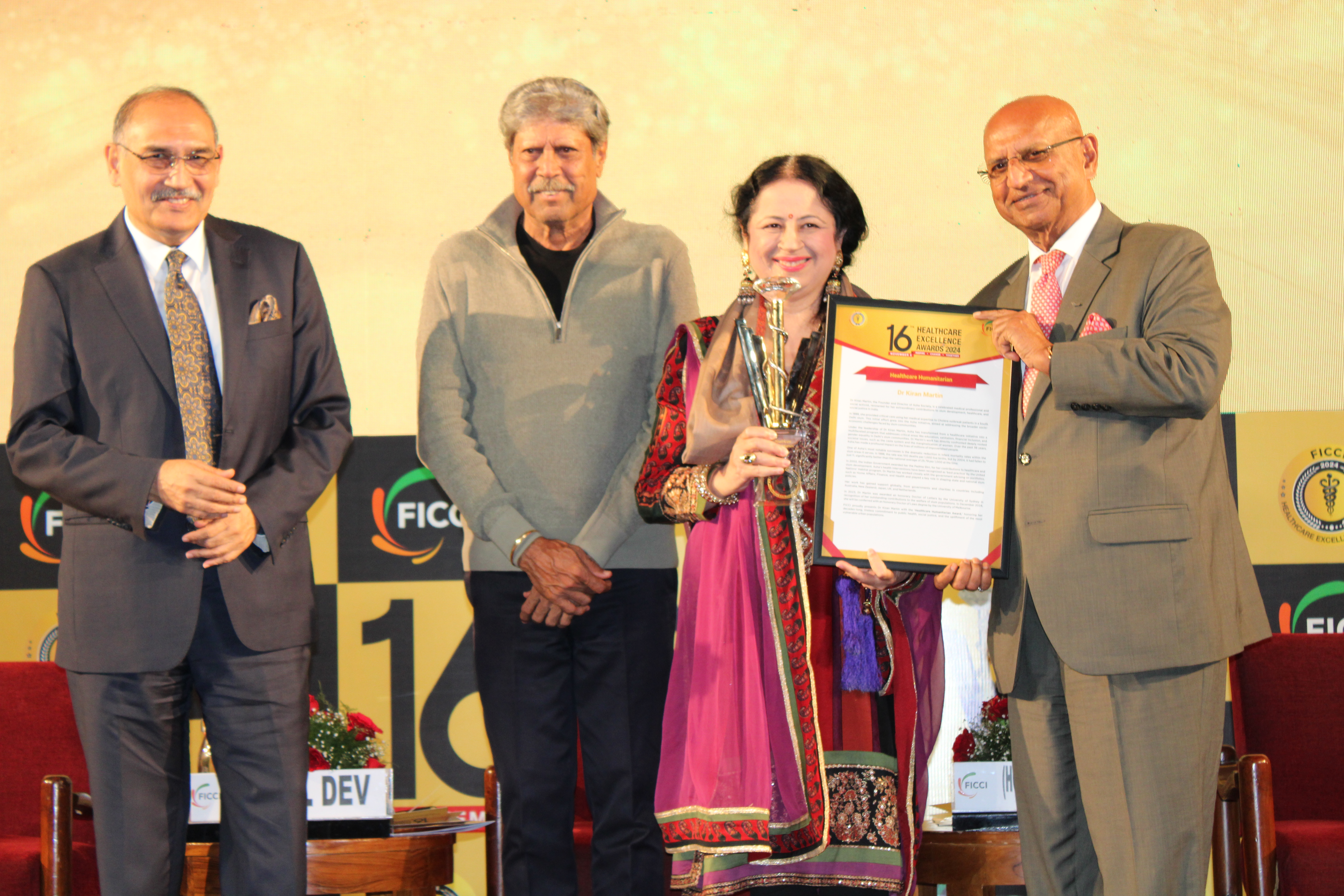
Martin receiving the Healthcare Humanitarian award by FICCI,2024

In October 2023, Martin received an honorary Doctor of Letters degree from the University of Sydney.

In November 2024, Martin received the Humanitarian Excellence in Healthcare Award from the Federation of Indian Chambers of Commerce & Industry

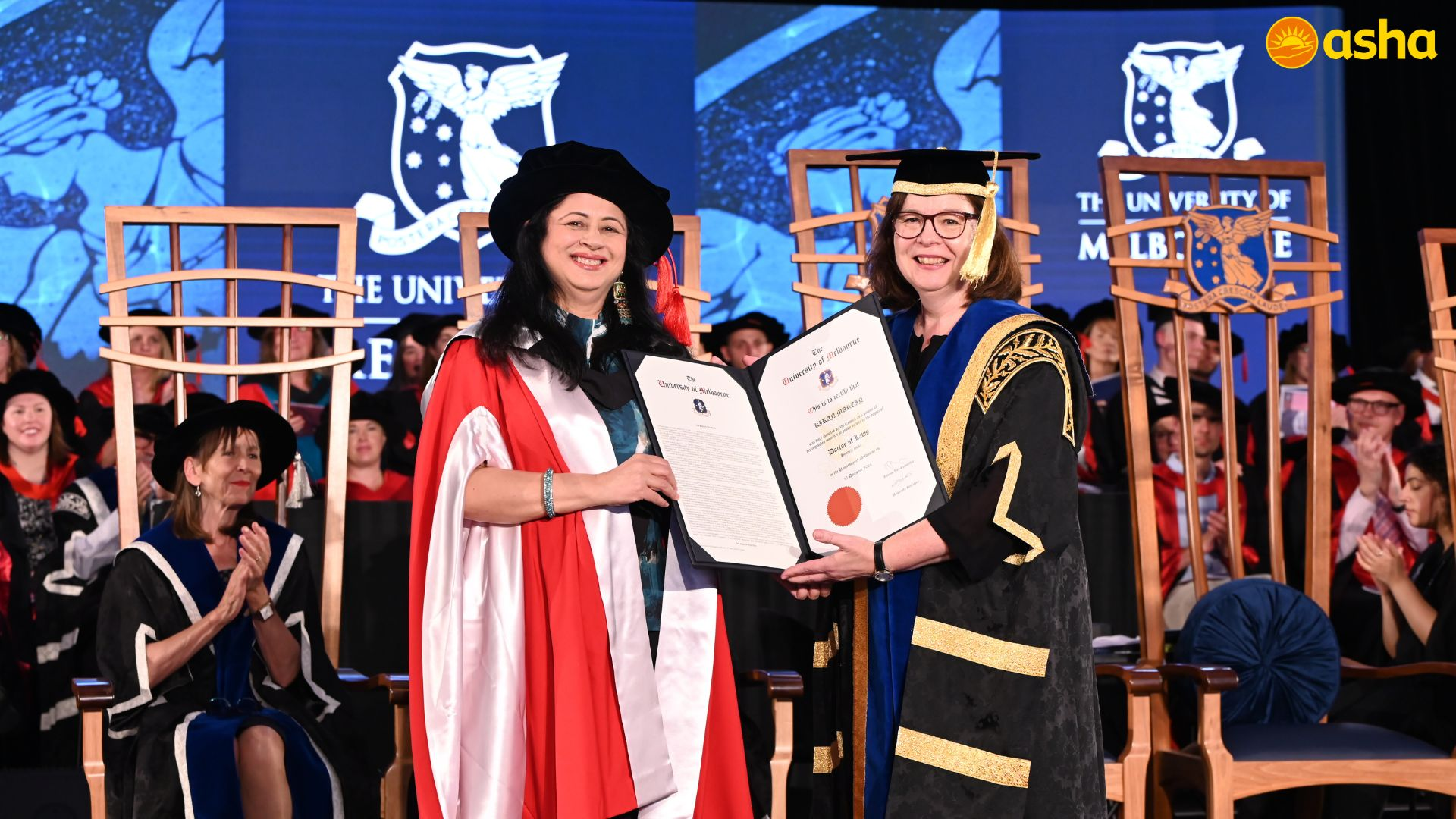
Martin honored with Doctor of Laws (Honoris Causa) by University of Melbourne, 2024

In December 2024, Martin was awarded a Doctor of Laws (Honoris Causa) by the University of Melbourne.

== Personal life ==
Martin has been supported by her husband, Godfrey Martin, who has served as the associate director of Asha for over 30 years. The couple’s daughters, Prerna Martin and Madhuri Martin, have also been closely associated with Asha.

== Books ==
In 2001, a book entitled Urban Health & Development was published after being written by Martin in collaboration with Dr Beverly Booth and Dr Ted Lankester. In addition, the work of Asha has been cited in publications, research and case studies by institutions such as the World Bank, Tearfund and others.

In 2013, the book A Journey of Hope was published to mark the 25th anniversary of the founding of Asha. It tells the story of Asha through the reflections of Martin and the photographs of Ed Sewell. It includes a foreword by former Australian Prime Minister Julia Gillard.

== See also ==
- UN-Habitat Scroll of Honour Award
