= Kirən =

Kiran
- Municipality
- Location within Azerbaijan
- Coordinates: 40°47′48″N 45°36′15″E
- Country: Azerbaijan
- Rayon: Tovuz

Population
  - Total: 650
- Time zone: UTC+4 (AZT)
  - Summer (DST): UTC+5 (AZT)

Kiran (also Kira and Kiren) is a village in the Tovuz Rayon of Azerbaijan.
