= Kyra Petrovskaya Wayne =

Russian-American author (1918–2018)

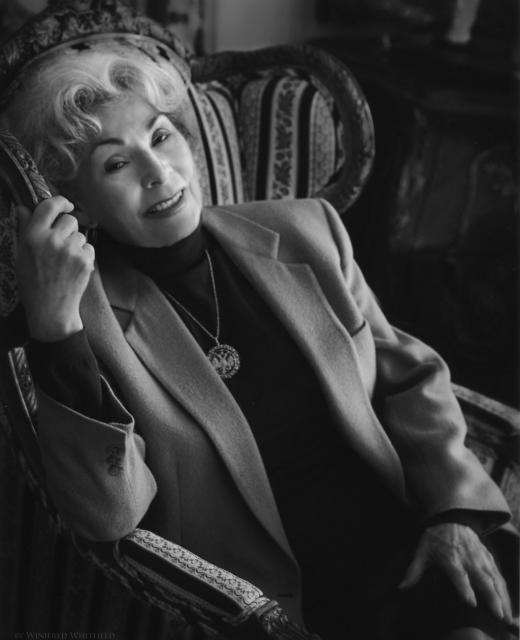
- Kyra Petrovskaya Wayne.
- Born: Kyra Petrovskaya; 31 December 1918; Crimea, Russian Socialist Federative Soviet Republic
- Died: 3 June 2018 (aged 99); Kingston, Washington, U.S.

Kyra Petrovskaya Wayne (December 31, 1918 – June 3, 2018) was a Russian-American author, actress and a sniper during World War II. A survivor of the siege of Leningrad, she married an American diplomat and came to the United States, becoming the author of 14 books. Among her various activities in America, she made many appearances on television programs, gave lectures on literature and history on cruise ships, and sang on concert stages.

== Early life ==
Kyra was born in Crimea, on the coast of the Black Sea in 1918. She was a descendant of one of the Russian noble families. Her father was a pilot during World War I. He was executed by a Bolshevik firing squad after the Russian Revolution, when Kyra was 7 months old. Her young mother never remarried, and they lived in poverty in Leningrad with her grandmother. They lost all the males of their family in the Russian Civil War that followed the revolution.

At age 8, Kyra was admitted into a school for musically gifted children, the Leningrad Academic Capella, and became a member of the children’s group of the Kirov Theater of Opera and Ballet. Even though she was studying music, she had to go through military training: All Soviet schools had to spend a certain amount of time on military education—marching, learning about guns, and competitive shooting. Kyra was a good marksman, and at 16 she won a distinction, the Voroshilov Marksman badge. After graduation, she entered the Institute of Theater Arts and became an actress and concert singer.

== The siege of Leningrad ==
She was drafted into the Red Army in 1941 at the beginning of the siege of Leningrad and became a sniper and a lieutenant. During this tragic period, almost 1 million people died in Leningrad of starvation, including Kyra’s mother and grandmother, who died while she was in the army.

After having been wounded twice, Kyra returned to service as a field nurse. During that time, she rescued a homeless orphan boy, who later became the subject of her book, Shurik. Toward the end of the war, she was decorated with three medals. She left for Moscow in 1943 and joined the Moscow Satire Theatre, renewing her artistic career.

== Moving to the United States ==
Because Kyra spoke several foreign languages fluently, she was invited to various diplomatic receptions as a representative of the Young Soviet Intelligentsia. It was there that she met her future husband, an American diplomat named Shirk. In February 1946, they married, in the first church service between a foreigner and a Russian since the Revolution. Perhaps because the wedding was attended by the whole diplomatic corps stationed in Moscow at that time, she was given permission to leave Russia with her husband. They left for the United States a few months later.

Kyra hoped to continue her theatrical career in the United States and went to several auditions but without success, mainly because of her accent. Her husband bought a farm in Pennsylvania, but neither one of them knew anything about farming. They worked hard on the farm, and Kyra continued to sing. She had a musical program called Interlude with Kyra on a television channel in Pennsylvania. She also was invited to join International Platform Association and began a thriving career as a speaker.

After nine years of marriage, she and her husband divorced, and Kyra moved to Los Angeles, where she became a contestant on Groucho Marx’s show You Bet Your Life. In 1955 she appeared on the show Big Surprise, but failed to win the $100,000 jackpot.

She was offered a contract by a publisher to write her autobiography, and in 1959, Kyra, her first book, was published by Prentice-Hall. The TV appearance also led to more television and concert invitations. Unfortunately, Kyra had to stop singing many years later when a nerve of her vocal cord was nipped during a thyroid surgery.

In 1960, she met and married Dr. George Wayne, a distinguished psychiatrist. They traveled extensively, leading to Kyra becoming an enrichment lecturer on Royal Viking Line cruises, which she pursued for 10 years. Her husband died in 1994. Kyra has one son and five grandchildren. She was passionate about dogs, some of which are the subjects of her books.

Kyra died in June 2018 at the age of 99.

== Her writing ==
Writing was part of her life from a very young age. A story she wrote at age 7 was published in a school magazine. In a special after-school playwriting program, she was part of a group of 10 students who created a Russian version of Huckleberry Finn for children’s theater, which, she believed, continued to be performed in Russia. After the success of her autobiography, Kyra wrote 13 more books on various subjects from Greek mythology to Russian cooking and from Russian-American history to young adult novels.

== Publications ==
- Against All Odds (2015)
- Memoirs of a Piano (2007)
- The Chaperone (2006)
- Pepper’s Ordeal (2000)
- Quest for Bigfoot (1996)
- Li’l Ol’ Charlie (1989)
- Quest for Empire (1986)
- Max: The Dog That Refused to Die (1979)
- Rekindle the Dreams (1977)
- The Witches of Barguzin (1975)
- The Awakening (1973)
- Shurik: A Story of the Siege of Leningrad (1970)
- Secrets of Russian Cooking (1961)
- The Quest for the Golden Fleece (1960)
- Kyra (1959)

== Other activities ==
In the 1960s, 1970s, and 1980s, Kyra was active in many cultural and civic organizations, receiving many awards and commendations. In the 1980s, she was the founder and president of the Clean Air Program (CAP), a program of the American Lung Association of Los Angeles County—intended to eradicate smog. She was president of the UCLA Medical Faculty Wives, a member of the board of ISOMATA, an international school of music and the arts, an affiliate of USC, and several other Los Angeles-based cultural organizations.
