= Kira (given name) =

- Pronunciation: /ˈkɪərə/ KEER-ə /ˈkiːrə/ KEE-rə
- Gender: Mostly feminine, unisex (Japanese)

Origin
- Meaning: Multiple ("like Ra", "beam of light", "shine", "ruler of the people")
- Region of origin: Multiple (Ancient Greece, Egypt, India, Ireland, Japan, Russia, Slavonic and Hindu)

Other names
- Variant forms: Kera, Kerra, Kiira, Kira, Kaira, Keara, Keera, Keira, Kiera, Kyra, Kyrah, Kirah, Kyreena, Kyrha, Kyria, Kyrie, Kyrene, Kyrra and Kirra
- Related names: Akira, Ciara, Cyrus, Kaira, Keira, Kiera, Kiran, Kyra

Kira is a mostly feminine name of multiple origins and meanings; in Japan, Kira is a unisex given name.

== Etymology ==
The feminine keria form is pronounced /ˈkɪərə/ KEER-ə or /ˈkiːrə/ KEE-rə. It might be a feminine form of the name Kiran, pronounced /ˈkɪərən/ KEER-ən. Kiran is of Hindi and Sanskrit origin, meaning "beam of light". In Ancient Hebrew "Keren" means both "a horn" and "a beam of light". Besides Sanskrit and Hebrew there might be other etymologies from Egyptian, where the word Ki-Ra means "like Ra", or Persian. Due to the Greek interpretation of the Persian king's name Kourosh (کوروش, Kūrosh) as Κύρος (Kýros) – which was obviously modeled after the Greek word κύριος (kýrios "lord"), the feminine form being κυρία (kyría) – Kyra (or Kira) can also be understood as a variant. Therefore, it is also in use as a feminine form of the Greek diminutive form Cyril.

In Russian, Kira (Ки́ра) is the feminine form of the masculine name Kir, meaning "mistress, ruler", but can be translated to "leader of the people", "one the people look to" or "beloved". Kira could also have arrived into Russian from the Persian-Greek name Kyra. Kira can also be the diminutive of the old and rare masculine given name Avvakir.

Kira is one of several Anglicized forms of the Irish name Ciara, which in Irish means "dark haired" or "little dark one".

Kira also means "strong woman" in Slavonic.

There is also a Japanese name, romanized as Kira, which is common in Japan, as both given name and family name (e.g. the Kira clan of Mikawa province). Kira kira also means "glittery, shiny" in Japanese.

Variant forms include Kaira, Keera, Keira, Kiera, Kyra, Kyrah, Kyreena, Kyrha, Kyria, Kyrie, Kyrene, Kyrra and Kirra.

== People ==
- Kira (born 1977), Belgian singer
- Kira (born 1978), German singer
- Kira (born 2003), Mexican professional wrestler
- Kira Balinger (born 2000), Filipino actress, model, endorser and performer
- Kira Banasińska (1899–2002), Polish humanitarian
- Kira Barton, American mechanical engineer
- Kira Bilecky (born 1986), American-Peruvian footballer
- Kira Bousloff (1914–2001), Russian-Australian dancer
- Kira Braun (born 1995), German politician
- Kira Brunton (born 1999), Canadian curler
- Kira Buckland (born 1987), American voice actress
- Kira Bulten (born 1973), Dutch Olympic swimmer
- Kira Bursky, American filmmaker
- Kira Carstensen, American documentary filmmaker
- Kira Chathli (born 1999), English cricketer
- Kira Chikazane (1563–1588), Japanese senior retainer
- Kira Cochrane (born 1977), British journalist
- Kira Davis, American film producer
- Kira Danganan-Azucena, Filipino diplomat
- Kira Dikhtyar, American fashion model
- Kira Dixon (born 1991), American model
- Kira Eggers (born 1974), Danish model
- Kira Geil (born 1985), Austrian ice dancer
- Kira Golovko (1919–2017), Russian actress
- Kira Nam Greene, Korean-American painter
- Kira Grünberg (born 1993), Austrian politician
- Kira Hagi (born 1996), Romanian actress
- Kira Hall (born 1962), American anthropologist
- Kira Lynn Harris (born 1963), American artist
- Kira Henehan (born 1974), American author
- Kira Holmes (born 2002), Australian cricketer
- Kira Horn (born 1995), German field hockey player
- Kira Hurley (born 1986), Canadian professional ice hockey player
- Kira Inugami, Japanese manga artist
- Kira Isabella (born 1993), Canadian country music artist
- Kira Ivanova (1963–2001), Russian figure skater
- Kira Jääskeläinen (born 1979), Finnish-Polish film director
- Kira Juodikis (born 2003), Canadian ice hockey player
- Kira Kattenbeck (born 1992), German badminton player
- Kira Kazantsev (born 1991), Russian-American beauty queen
- Kira Kelly, American cinematographer
- Kira Kimura (born 2004), Japanese snowboarder
- Kira Kosarin (born 1997), American actress
- Kira Kovalenko (born 1989), Russian film director
- Kira Kreylis-Petrova (1931–2021), Russian theater actress
- Kira Lewis Jr. (born 2001), American basketball player
- Kira Lipperheide (born 2000), German bobsledder
- Kira Makarova, Estonian-American researcher
- Kira Maria, Bulgarian empress consort
- Kira Matsutani (born 2003), Japanese kickboxer
- Kira Miró (born 1980), Spanish actress and a presenter
- Kira Mozgalova (born 1982), Russian Olympic athlete
- Kira Muratova (1934–2018), Soviet and Ukrainian film director, screenwriter, and actress
- Kira Nagy (born 1977), Hungarian tennis player
- Kira Narayanan (born 1994), Indian film actress
- Kira Obolensky, American playwright and author
- Kira O'Reilly, British performance artist
- Kira Pavlova (born 2004), Russian tennis player
- Kira Peikoff (born 1985), American journalist
- Kira Marie Peter-Hansen (born 1998), Danish politician
- Kira Phillips (born 1995), Australian rules footballer
- Kira Peikoff (born 1985), American journalist and novelist
- Kira Plastinina (born 1992), Russian fashion designer
- Kira Poutanen (born 1974), Finnish writer and actress
- Kira Borisovna Povarova (born 1933), Russian professor
- Kira Puru, Australian musician
- Kira Radinsky (born 1986), Israeli computer scientist
- Kira Reed (born 1971), American actress
- Kira Rice (born 2004), American basketball player
- Kira Roessler (born 1962), American musician
- Grand Duchess Kira Kirillovna of Russia (1909–1967), Russian grand duchess
- Kira Rudik (born 1985), Ukrainian politician
- Princess Kira of Prussia (1943–2004)
- Kira Sabin (born 1998/1999), American wildlife painter
- Kira Salak (born 1971), American writer
- Kira Shashkina, Russian pianist
- Kira B. Shingareva (1938–2013), Russian scientist
- Kira Shyrykina (born 2008), Ukrainian rhythmic gymnast
- Kira Simon-Kennedy, American film producer
- Kira Skov (born 1976), Danish singer
- Kira Soltanovich (born 1973), Ukrainian comedian
- Kira Stepanova (born 1993), Russian Olympic athlete
- Kira Sugiyama (1910–1988), Japanese photographer
- Kira Thurman, African-American historian
- Kira Toussaint (born 1994), Dutch swimmer
- Kira Tozer (born 1984), Canadian voice actress
- Kira Trusova (born 1994), Russian handball player
- Kira Vincent-Davis (born 1979), American voice actress
- Kira Walkenhorst (born 1990), German beach volleyball player
- Kira Weidle-Winkelmann (born 1996), German alpine skier
- Kira Weis (born 2004), German long-distance runner
- Kira Willey, American musician
- Kira Yarmysh (born 1989), Russian writer
- Kira Yoshinaka (1641–1703), Japanese politician
- Kira Zvorykina (1919–2014), Soviet and Ukrainian chess player

== Fictional characters ==
- Kira Argounova, the protagonist in Ayn Rand's We the Living
- Kira Aso, female protagonist in the Japanese manga Mars
- Kira Carsen in the video game Star Wars: The Old Republic
- Kira Daidohji in the video game series Arcana Heart
- Kira Finster in the Nickelodeon animated television series Rugrats and its spin-off All Grown Up!
- Kira Ford (aka Yellow Dino Ranger) in Power Rangers: Dino Thunder
- Kyra Hart in the WB/CW television series Reba, played by Scarlett Pomers
- Kira Marlowe in the television drama Flashpoint, constable, Special Response Unit dispatcher, played by Pascale Hutton
- Kira Sakuratsuki in the anime Futakoi
- Sumeragi Kira in the anime Uta no Prince-Sama
- Kira Supernova, in the 2013 animated film Escape from Planet Earth, voiced by Sarah Jessica Parker
- Kira Tsubasa, in the Japanese multimedia Love Live! School Idol Project
- Kira Yamato in the Japanese anime television series Mobile Suit Gundam SEED and Mobile Suit Gundam SEED Destiny
- Kira Yukimura, one of the main characters in the MTV drama Teen Wolf
- Kira (Death Note), alias of the protagonist Light Yagami in the Japanese manga/anime franchise Death Note
- Kira (Gelfling) in the film The Dark Crystal
- Kira (Iggy Arbuckle), an anthropomorphic rat in the Canadian animated television series Iggy Arbuckle
- Kira (Mortal Kombat)
- Kira Nerys in the Star Trek Deep Space 9 television series (family name Kira, given name Nerys)
- Kira the Seer in the Charmed television series universe
- Kira, a recurring character and antagonist in season 3 of Disney Channel's Andi Mack
- Kira, the main character of the book Gathering Blue by Lois Lowry
- Kira, daughter of Sarah Manning in the Canadian sci-fi television series Orphan Black
- Kira in the 1980 film Xanadu, played by Olivia Newton-John
- Kira Yoshikage, the main antagonist of JoJo's Bizarre Adventure: Diamond is Unbreakable by Hirohiko Araki
- Kira Navárez, the main character of the 2020 sci-fi novel To Sleep in a Sea of Stars
- Kira King, one of the main characters of the 2022 Disney+ original movie Sneakerella
- Kira Darvis, daughter of the main character Edgin in the 2023 movie Dungeons & Dragons: Honor Among Thieves
- Kira, fictional super hero, presenter of the children's TV show Band Kids played by Renata Sayuri
- Kira Bailey, American Girl character

== See also ==
- Keira (given name)
- Kiera
- Kiira
- Kiran
- Kyra (given name)
