= Ceira =

Ceira may refer to:

- Ceira (Coimbra), a civil parish in Portugal
- Ceira River, a river in Portugal
- Ceira longipennis, a moth in the family Notodontidae
- Cacyparis ceira, a moth in the genus Cacyparis

== See also ==
- Ceiràs, a commune in southern France
- Keira (disambiguation)
- Caira (disambiguation)
- Ciera (disambiguation)
- Ciara (given name)
