= Kiara (given name) =

- Gender: Female; Unisex (Japan)
- Language: Irish; Italian; Japanese

Origin
- Meaning: Various
- Region of origin: Ireland; Italy; Japan

Kiara (/kiˈɑːrə/ kee-AR-ə or /ˈkɪərə/ KEER-ə) is a given name with various origins.

It may be a variant of the Italian name Chiara, meaning bright, or the Irish name Ciara, meaning dark-haired.

In Japan, Kiara is an uncommon name typically given to males; its meaning is dependent upon the characters used to spell the name. It has also been used for girls in Japan in recent years and classified as part of a trend for kira-kira or shiny names notable for using uncommon kanji characters to spell names that have novel meanings or pronunciations. For instance, the given name of Kiara Sato (Japanese: 佐藤 妃星), a member of the Japanese idol girl group AKB48 Team 4, uses kanji characters meaning princess and star.

== Usage ==
The name has been in wide use worldwide. In the United States it has been among the top 1,000 names for newborn girls since 1988. It also has been rarely used for American boys.

== People ==
- Kiara (singer) (born 1963), Venezuelan singer-songwriter
- Kiara Advani (born 1992), Indian actress
- Kiara Bisaro (born 1975), Canadian mountain biker
- Kiara Bowers (born 1991), Australian rules footballer
- Kiara Brinkman (born 1979), American writer
- Kiara Fontanesi (born 1994), Italian professional motocross racer
- Kiara Fontanilla (born 2000) American-born soccer player for the Philippines women's national football team
- Kiara Kabukuru (born 1975), American fashion model
- Kiara Laetitia (born 1979), Italian rock singer and entrepreneur
- Kiara Leslie (born 1995), American professional basketball player
- Kiara Muhammad (born 1998), American actress
- Kiara Munteanu (born 1997), Australian gymnast
- Kiara Nirghin (born 2000), South African inventor, scientist and speaker
- Kiara Nowlin (born 1995), American gymnast
- Kiara Ortega (born 1993), Puerto Rican dancer and beauty pageant title holder
- Kiara “Kiki” Pickett (born 1999), American professional soccer player
- Kiara Rodriguez (born 2002), Ecuadoran Paralympic athlete
- Kiara Saitō (齋藤樹愛羅) (born 2004), Japanese idol
- Kiara Sasso (born 1979), Brazilian actress
- Kiara Sato (佐藤妃星) (born 2000), a member of AKB48 Team 4, Japanese idol
- Takanashi Kiara (小鳥遊キアラ), Austrian VTuber and singer affiliated with Hololive Productions

== Fiction ==
- Kiara, fictional character in the film The Lion King II: Simba's Pride
- Princess Kiara, a main character in Super K – The Movie, a 2011 Indian animated film
- Kiara “Kie” Carrera, a character in the Netflix series Outer Banks
- Sessyoin Kiara, fictional character in the PSP game Fate/Extra: CCC and mobile gacha game Fate/Grand Order

== See also ==
- Kiara (drag queen), stage name of Canadian drag entertainer Dimitri Nana-Côté (born 1998)
- Kiiara (Kiara Saulters, born 1995), American singer
- Kiara (disambiguation)
- Ciara (given name)
- Chiara (name)
- Kirara
- Kyara
- Keira (given name)
