= Cierra =

Cierra is a feminine given name. Notable people with the name include:

- Cierra Burdick (born 1993), American professional basketball player
- Cierra Dillard (born 1996), American-Senegalese basketball player
- Cierra Fields (born 1999), American activist
- Cierra Ramirez (born 1995), American actress and singer
- Cierra Runge (born 1996), American competition swimmer
- Cierra Jackson, American beauty queen in Miss District of Columbia 2016

== See also ==
- Ciara (disambiguation)
- Ciera (disambiguation)
- Sierra (disambiguation)
