= Kirara =

- Gender: female
- Language: Japanese

Origin
- Meaning: The kanji 雲母, "mica" or "isinglass", is made up of the characters for "cloud" (雲) and "mother" (母), and could also be pronounced "unmo" in addition to "kirara". The pronunciation "kirara" is similar to the Japanese sound effect "kirakira" used for something glittery, which is fitting to the appearance of mica.

Other names
- Alternative spelling: 雲母

Kirara may refer to:

== People with the given name ==
- Kirara (musician) (Korean: 키라라, born 1992), South Korean electronic musician
- Kirara Asuka (明日花 キララ; born 1988), Japanese model and former adult video actress
- Kirara Shiraishi (白石 黄良々; born 1996), Japanese sprinter

== Fictional characters ==
- Kirara (InuYasha), a character in the manga series InuYasha
- Kirara, a character in 2020 video game Genshin Impact
- Kirara Amanogawa, a List of Go! Princess PreCure characters
- Kirara Hanazono, character in Aikatsu Stars!
- Kirara Hazama, a character in Assassination Classroom
- Kirara Hoshi, a character in Jujutsu Kaisen

== Places ==
- Kirara Beach, Shimane
- Kirara Beach, Yamaguchi

== Film and television ==
- Kirara: Ano Ang Kulay ng Pag-ibig?, a Philippine television drama series

== Manga ==
- Kirara (manga), a manga by Toshiki Yui that was also adapted into an OVA
- Kirara magazine series published by Houbunsha, which mainly consists of four-panel (Note: except for Manga Time Kirara Forward.) seinen manga
  - Manga Time Kirara
  - Manga Time Kirara Carat
  - Manga Time Kirara Max
  - Manga Time Kirara Forward

== Music ==
- "Kirara" (song), a 1998 song by Shizuka Kudō

== See also ==
- Kiara (disambiguation)
- Kyara (disambiguation)
- Ciara (disambiguation)
- Chiara (disambiguation)
