= Ciara (given name) =

- Pronunciation: /ˈkɪərə/ KEER-ə
- Gender: female

Origin
- Language: Irish Gaelic
- Meaning: dark haired
- Region of origin: Ireland

Other names
- Related names: Ciarán, Kiara, Keira, Kiera

Ciara (/ˈkɪərə/ KEER-ə) is a popular Irish language female name and was tenth on the list of most popular names given to baby girls in Ireland in 2006. It is the feminine version of the name Ciarán, meaning "dark-haired", and was also the name of Saint Ciara, a seventh-century Irish saint venerated by the Roman Catholic Church. The name is often anglicized as Keira, Kiara, or Kiera.

== People ==
- Ciara Baxendale (born 1995), British actress
- Ciara Bravo (born 1997), American actress, pronounced "Sierra"
- Ciara Considine, a musician known for her Celtic and folk music
- Ciara Conway (born 1980), Irish Labour Party politician, Teachta Dála (TD) for Waterford from 2011 to 2016
- Ciara Gaynor, a camogie player
- Ciara Gibson-Byrne (born 1992), British water polo player
- Ciara Grant (footballer, born 1978)
- Ciara Grant (footballer, born 1993)
- Ciara Hanna (born 1991), American actress and model
- Ciara (born 1985), singer Ciara Harris, pronounced "Sierra"
- Ciara Horne (born 1989), British racing cyclist
- Ciara Janson (born 1987), English actress
- Ciara Kelly, Irish journalist and broadcaster
- Ciara Lucey, Irish camogie player
- Ciara McAvoy, poster artist
- Ciara McCormack (born 1979), a Canadian–born Irish female soccer defender
- Ciara Michel (born 1985), British volleyball player
- Ciara Miller, American television personality
- Ciara Newell, an original member of Irish girl group Bellefire
- Ciara O'Connor (camogie)
- Ciara Peelo (born 1979), Irish sailor
- Ciara Renée (born 1990), American actress
- Ciara Sexton (born 1988), Irish dancer
- Ciara Sotto (born 1980), Filipina actress and singer (pronounced as "sha-ra")
- Ciara Storey, Irish camogie player
- CMAT (musician) (Ciara Mary-Alice Thompson), (born 1996), Irish musician
- Ciara Whelan, Irish television presenter

== Fictional characters ==
- Ciara Brady
- Ciara (on the TV show Lost Girl)
- Ciara Porter (in the novel The Cuckoo's Calling)

== See also ==
- Ciara (disambiguation)
- Chara (given name)
- Kiara
- Keira (given name)
- Chiara
- List of Irish-language given names
