= Kiara =

Kiara may refer to:

== People ==
- Kiara (given name), includes a list of people with the given name
- Saint Cera (died 679), also spelled Kiara, a 7th-century Irish Roman Catholic saint

== Music ==
- Kiara, an American R&B group known for the 1988 song "This Time"
- "Kiara", a song from the 2010 Bonobo album Black Sands

== Other uses ==
- Kiara, Western Australia, a suburb of Perth, Australia
- Kiara (building), a high-rise building in Seattle, Washington, United States

== See also ==
- Kiiara (born 1995), stage name of American singer Kiara Saulters (born 1995)
- Kyara (disambiguation)
- Ciara (disambiguation)
- Kirara (disambiguation)
- Chiara (disambiguation)
- Keira (disambiguation)
