= Saint Munde =

Scottish abbot

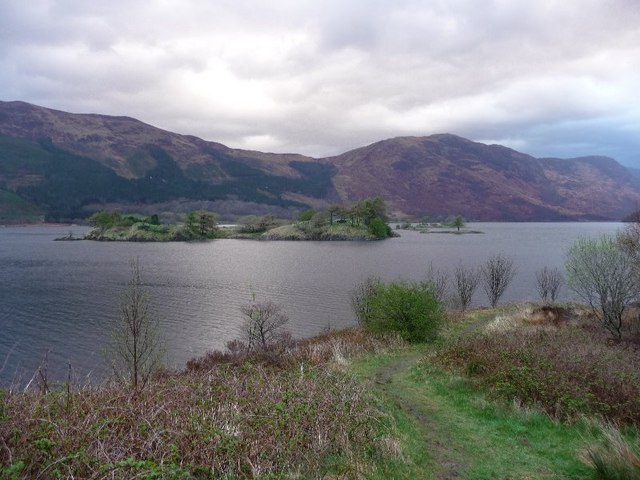
- Eilean Munde, the Island of St. Munde
- Residence: Argyll, Scotland
- Died: c. 962; Argyll, Scotland
- Canonized: Pre-congregation
- Feast: 15 April

Saint Munde (or Mundus, Mund, Mond; died c. 962) was a Scottish abbot in Argyll, Scotland. There is some confusion between this saint and the much earlier Saint Fintan Munnu. His feast day is 15 April.

== Eilean Munde and Fintan Munnu ==
On 6 July 1770 Bishop Robert Forbes sailed up Loch Leven. He records: "We likewise come in view of the Island of St. Munde, who was Abbot and Confessor in Argyll…Upon this island is the ruin of a little chapel, all the four walls of which are still entire, dedicated to the same St. Munde." Samuel Lewis in his Topographical Dictionary of Scotland says that the parish of Elean-Munde was so-called from St. Munde, who was an abbot in Argyll in the 10th century. Another source says that Eilean Munde, and four Kilmuns in Argyll, are said to be named after the Irish saint sometimes called Fintan Munnu in Scotland, but notes that this is by no means certain. Fintan Munnu, Mun or Munn (died 635) was from Leinster in Ireland and was said to be a cousin of Columba.

== Monks of Ramsgate account ==
The Monks of Ramsgate wrote in their Book of Saints (1921),

Munde (St.) Abbot. (April 15)
(10th cent.) A Scottish Saint, head of a great monastery in Argyle. He was a zealous missionary and a man of prayerful and austere life. He died A.D. 962. The dedications of various churches perpetuate his holy memory.

== Butler's account ==
The hagiographer Alban Butler (1710–1773) wrote in his Lives of the Fathers, Martyrs, and Other Principal Saints under April 15,

St. Munde, Abbot. Several churches bear the name of this saint in Argyleshire in Scotland, in which he was formerly honoured as principal patron, and which he edified, by the shining light of his example, and by his zealous preaching, in the tenth century. He governed there a great monastery, founded several others in that province, and left behind him many great models of Christian perfection. His excellent maxims,--relating to the most tender and universal fraternal charity, meekness, the love of silence and retiredness, and a constant attention to the divine presence,--were handed down to posterity as sacred oracles. St. Munde died in a happy old age in 962. See King, Hunter the Dominican, De Viris Illustr. Scotiæ, &c.

== O'Hanlon's analysis ==
John O'Hanlon (1821–1905) says in his Lives of the Irish saints under April 15,

ARTICLE VII.-REPUTED FESTIVAL OF ST. MUND, OR MUNDUS, OF ARGYLE, SCOTLAND. [Probably in the Sixth and Seventh Centuries.] The great sanctity of Mundus, Abbot, in Scotland, has caused his name to be entered, in the various Scottish Kalendars of King, of Thomas Dempster, and of David Camerarius, at the 15th of April. However, his festival seems to be referred, either to the 21st of October, when St. Fintan Munnu is venerated, and the latter name, it is thought, has been confounded with Mundus, or Mun. Yet, there may be question regarding such identity. There may be some doubt, also, as to the identification of Mundus, who taught St. Fillan, according to Colgan. This latter writer ventures on a conjecture, that he might have been a St. Mundus, the son of Feredach, and of the Dalfiatach, in Ultonia, as the Mundus mentioned by Camerarius departed, in the year 962, while St. Fintan Mun died, A.D. 634.

Notwithstanding the manifest error of chronology admitted, between the period when St. Fillan and his St. Mundus lived, with their assumed relationship of master and disciple; Camerarius indicates, at the 15th of April, that the present holy man was Abbot, in the region of Argathelia, or Argyle, in Albania, where he erected many monasteries. The like statement occurs in Dempster's work. We are told, moreover, that several churches bear the name of St. Munde, Abbot, in Argyleshire, where he was formerly honoured as the principal patron, and where, owing to the shining light of his example and to his zealous preaching, he left behind him many great models of Christian perfection. Moreover, he left excellent maxims, which related to the most tender and universal charity, meekness, and love of retirement. He always contrived to keep himself in the Divine presence.

Camerarius relates, in his account of St. Fillan, that this disciple succeeded his master after the death of St. Mundus, and died himself, A.D. 649. However, as may be judged, from his own context, Camerarius was betrayed into a gross anachronism; for, he states, in another place, that St. Mundus died, A.D. 962. The Rev. Alban Butler also adopts this statement, for which he cites the authority of Hunter, the Dominican. The Bollandists have some account, at this date, of the venerable Abbot; but, it is chiefly drawn, from the statements of Camerarius, Dempster, and of the Aberdeen Breviary.

We are told, by a Scottish writer, that St. Mund was no other than the St. Fintan Munnu of the Irish Calendars, and that his crozier had its hereditary keepers' croft of land, at Kilmun, in Scotland. However, Dempster seems to confound St. Mundus with St. Magnus, who was venerated, in the Orkney Islands, on the following day; and some writings are attributed to him, by the same author. Nevertheless, this latter statement may well be questioned; and, the learned Bollandist, Father Godefrid Henschenn declares, that he no more believes such writings have any existence, than he does regarding many of the other books, which Dempster attributes to each of the saints of Scotland, as if all these were authors. He believes, moreover, that most of those attributed writings were never seen by any man, nor to be found in any place.

== Sources ==
- Bradley, Ian (2015), Argyll: The Making of a Spiritual Landscape, Saint Andrew Press, ISBN 9780861538386
- Butler, Alban (1798), The Lives of the Primitive Fathers, Martyrs, and Other Principal Saints, vol. IV, Edinburgh: J. Moir This article incorporates text from this source, which is in the public domain.
- Butter, Rachel (2010), "St Munnu in Ireland and Scotland; an exploration of his cult", in Steve Boardman; Eila Williamson (eds.), The Cult of Saints and the Virgin Mary in Medieval Scotland, Boydell & Brewer, ISBN 9781843835622
- Forbes, Robert (1886), James Brown Craven (ed.), Journals of The Episcopal Visitations of The Right Honourable Robert Forbes, Skeffington & Son This article incorporates text from this source, which is in the public domain.
- Lewis, Samuel (1851), A Topographical Dictionary of Scotland, Comprising the Several Countries, Islands, Cities, Burgh and Market Towns, Parishes, and Principal Villages, with Historical and Statistical Descriptions: Embellished with a Large Map of Scotland, and Engravings of the Seals and Arms of the Different Burghs and Universities, vol. 2, S. Lewis This article incorporates text from this source, which is in the public domain.
- O'Hanlon, John (1875), Lives of the Irish saints, vol. 4, Dublin: James Duffy This article incorporates text from this source, which is in the public domain.
- St. Augustine's Abbey, Ramsgate (1921). The Book of saints : a dictionary of servants of God canonized by the Catholic Church. London: A. & C. Black, ltd. OCLC 671676136. This article incorporates text from this source, which is in the public domain.
