= Kirara Beach =

Kirara Beach may refer to:

- Kirara Beach, Shimane
- Kirara Beach, Yamaguchi
