= Povarov =

Povarov (feminine: Povarova) is a Russian-language occupational surname derived from the word povar, "cook". Notable people with the surname include:

- Gelliy Povarov, (1928-2004), Soviet and Russian mathematician, philosopher and historian of science.
- Kira Povarova, Soviet and Russian materials scientist
- Leonard Povarov (1926—2002), Soviet and Russian chemist, the namesake of the Povarov reaction
