= Ciera =

Ciera may refer to:

== People ==
=== Given name ===
- Ciera Payton (born 1986), American actress and writer
- Ciera Rogers (born 1987), American business owner, model, and fashion designer
- Ciera Davis, victim in the Hart family murders
- Ciera Eastin, Survivor: Blood vs. Water contestant

=== Surname ===
- Giacomo Ciera, Roman Catholic prelate
- Ippolito Ciera (fl. 1546–1561), Italian composer

== Other uses ==
- Oldsmobile Cutlass Ciera, a 1981–1996 American mid-size car

== See also ==
- Ciara (disambiguation)
- Cierra (disambiguation)
- Sierra (disambiguation)
