= Caira =

Caira may refer to:

- Caira County, in New South Wales, Australia
- Reece Caira (born 1993), Australian footballer

== See also ==
- Ciara (disambiguation)
- Ceira (disambiguation)
- Kaira (disambiguation)
