= Warwick Stengards =

Warwick Stengårds is an Australian-Swedish conductor known for opera, ballet, and contemporary music. His career spans over three decades, with performances at institutions like Opera Australia, the Vienna State Opera, and the Royal Swedish Opera.

== Early life and education ==
Warwick Stengårds began his musical education in Australia, where he studied conducting at the Western Australian Academy of Performing Arts (WAAPA). Early in his career, he worked as a répétiteur and conductor. He spent time in Sweden and Austria..

== Career ==
His first major orchestral concert was in 1990, and received a mixed review in The Age.

Stengårds' conducting repertoire includes operas of Mozart and Verdi to modern compositions by figures like Aribert Reimann and Ross Edwards. His international engagements include appearances with Opera Australia, the Vienna State Opera, Royal Swedish Opera, and the West Australian Ballet.

He gained recognition for his interpretation of modernist operas. In 2019, Stengårds conducted the Australian premiere of Reimann's Ghost Sonata with Opera Australia, which was hailed for its atmospheric and precise interpretation. Critics commended his ability to bring out the psychological and tonal complexities of the work.

Stengårds has also conducted numerous productions of Wagner’s works, including The Ring Cycle for children at the Vienna State Opera in 2014, a unique adaptation designed to introduce younger audiences to Wagner's epic operatic works.

=== Ballet and orchestral work ===
In addition to his opera work, Stengårds has an impressive track record in conducting ballet. He has worked with the West Australian Ballet and the Australian Ballet, leading productions such as Giselle and The Nutcracker. His ballet engagements have included international tours.

=== Reviews and critical reception ===
His work with Opera Australia on productions like Madama Butterfly and Christina's World received critical acclaim for their emotional depth and orchestral clarity.

His direction of Reimann's Ghost Sonata was described as "mesmerizing," with reviewers highlighting his nuanced understanding of modern music's psychological underpinnings. He also enjoyed great success with Der Diktator by Krenek, and Boojum by Martin & Peter Wesley-Smith both at State Opera of South Australia.

== Selected repertoire ==
- Don Giovanni by Mozart (1998, 2009)
- Carmen by Bizet (1997, Stockholm)
- La Traviata by Verdi (2000-2001, Stockholm)
- Pelléas et Mélisande by Debussy (1987)
- Wozzeck by Berg (1989)
- The Ghost Sonata by Aribert Reimann (2019)
