= Chiara (name) =

- Pronunciation: Italian pronunciation: [ˈkjaːra]
- Gender: Female

Origin
- Meaning: bright
- Region of origin: Italy

Other names
- Related names: Clara

Chiara is both a feminine Italian given name and a surname meaning bright. Notable people with the name include:

== Given name ==
- Saint Clare of Assisi, in Italian Chiara d'Assisi
- Saint Clare of Montefalco, in Italian Chiara da Montefalco
- Chiara Ambrosini (born 2006), Argentine field hockey player
- Chiara Appendino (born 1984), Italian politician
- Blessed Chiara Badano
- Chiara Berti, contestant on US TV show Big Brother 3
- Chiara Aurelia, American actress
- Chiara Boggiatto, Italian Olympic swimmer (born 1986)
- Chiara Boni (born 1948), Italian fashion designer
- Princess Maria Chiara of Bourbon-Two Sicilies (born 2005), Italian socialite
- Chiara Brancati, (born 1981), Italian water polo player
- Chiara Caselli, Italian actress
- Chiara Civello, Italian singer-songwriter
- Chiara Dal Santo (born 1969), Italian sprint canoer
- Chiara Ferragni, Italian blogger and fashion designer
- Chiara Francia (born 2003), Argentine actress and singer
- Chiara Galiazzo, Italian singer
- Chiara Gensini (born 1982), Italian actress
- Chiara Iezzi, Italian singer (born 1973)
- Chiara Lauvergnac (born 1961), Italian activist
- Chiara Lubich, founder of the Focolare movement
- Chiara Mastalli, Italian actress, appears in the HBO series Rome
- Chiara Mastroianni, Italian-French actress (born 1972)
- Chiara Mazzel (born 1996), Italian para-alpine skier
- Chiara Nappi, Italian physicist
- Chiara Neto, Italian chemist
- Chiara Oliver (born 2004), Spanish singer
- Chiara Poggi (1981–2007), Italian murder victim
- Chiara Porro, Australian diplomat
- Chiara Sacchi (born 2002), Argentine climate activist
- Chiara Scherrer (born 1996), Swiss steeplechase runner
- Chiara Siracusa, Maltese pop singer, best known by the mononym Chiara
- Chiara Simionato, Italian speed skater
- Chiara Singarella (born 2003), Argentine footballer
- Chiara Vigo, Italian textile artist and weaver
- Chiara Zanni, Canadian voice actress
- Chiara Zorzi (died 1454), regent for her son the Duke of Athens
- Paola e Chiara, Italian sisters and pop singers
- Edelfa Chiara Masciotta, Miss Italia for 2005

== Surname ==
- Francesca Chiara, Italian singer with the band Lovecrave
- Giuseppe Chiara (1602–1685), Italian Jesuit missionary
- Margaret Chiara, U.S. attorney fired by the George W. Bush administration
- Maria Chiara, Italian lyric soprano
- Paolo De Chiara (born 1979), Italian journalist and writer
- Piero Chiara (1913–1986), Italian writer
- Roberto Di Chiara (1933–2008), Argentine journalist, archivist, and filmmaker

== See also ==
- Chiara (disambiguation)
- Chara (given name)
