= Skylark (Italian band) =

Italian power metal band

- Origin: Italy
- Genres: Power metal
- Years active: 1994–present
- Members: Eddy Antonini; Roberto "Brodo" Potenti
- Website: skylarkrock.com

Skylark is an Italian power metal band founded in 1994 by Eddy Antonini.

== History ==
Skylark was founded by Eddy Antonini in 1994 with the intent of exploring several musical styles in one project. After adding four members, the group recorded the 1995 album The Horizon and the Storm, the first of a series of yearly releases. From 1996 they released on the Italian label Underground Symphony. The 1997 released Dragon's Secrets received several positive reviews in metal magazines. Antonini also recorded a solo effort, When Water Became Ice, in 1998 in between Skylark releases.

In 1999, they released the first of a two album project, The Divine Gates; the second half was released the following year. The group had several of their albums released in Japan, where they found critical success, particularly in the music magazine Burrn!. They toured Europe in 2000 playing in Germany and headlined at the Rock Machina 2000 festival in Spain. After 2001's The Princess Day, the group embarked on a world tour, including dates in Japan. The group then went on a short hiatus, returning in 2004 with Wings, featuring Kiara Laetitia the new vocalist. After three albums on Scarlet Records, they contracted with Underground Symphony again in 2006. In 2007, they continued the Divine Gates project with a third release "The last gate". In 2007, "The Last Gate" hit the HMV Japanese Rock and Pop charts at No. 3 only behind Bon Jovi and Dream Theater staying in the Top 50 for several weeks. In January 2008, Skylark played the longest Pan China tour of History for a western band. They played seven headliner shows touching even Harbin, capital of Heilongjiang, plus one supporting gig with Nightwish and Dream Theater in Beijing and one supporting gig in Shanghai with Nightwish. In May 2008, Skylark played for the first time in the United States and recorded a live DVD of their performance in Phoenix, Arizona. This DVD "Divine Gates Part IV The Live Gate" hit position No. 4 in the HMV Japanese charts only behind Iron Maiden, Rolling Stones and Britney Spears. Skylark as of 2010 played five tours in Japan. In 2011, Kiara Laetitia left Skylark.

The album Twilights of Sand stayed on the Japanese Amazon rock/metal chart for 30 days, occupying position number one for 10 days and position number two (only behind the new Van Halen release) for another 10 days. Twilights of Sand also reached the top 100 global chart remaining there for 15 days, reaching its peak at number 12 and ending 32nd in the second week of January.

== Members ==
=== Current members ===
- Roberto "Brodo" Potenti – bass guitar, guitar
- Eddy Antonini – keyboard, piano, harpsichord

=== Former members ===
- Ashley Watson – vocals
- Fabio Dozzo – vocals/backing vocals
- Kiara Laetitia – vocals
- Nico Tordini – guitar
- Carlos Cantatore – drums
- Francesco Meles – drums
- Federico Ria – drums
- Fabrizio "Pota" Romani – guitar

== Discography ==
=== Albums ===
- 1995: The Horizon & the Storm (self production)
- 1997: Dragon's Secret (Underground Symphony, Meldac Japan, Rock Empire Taiwan re-mastered)
- 1999: Divine Gates Part I: Gate of Hell (Underground Symphony, Hot Rockin Japan, Magnum Music Taiwan, CD Maximum Russia, Pony Canyon South Korea)
- 2000: Divine Gates Part II: Gate of Heaven (Underground Symphony/Pick up/SPV/Metal Blade, Hot Rockin Japan, Magnum Music Taiwan, CD Maximum Russia, Dark Angel Records Thailand tape version, Pony Canyon South Korea)
- 2002: The Princess' Day (Underground Symphony/Pick up, Hot Rockin Japan, Magnum Music Taiwan, CD Maximum Russia, Dark Angel Records Thailand tape version, Pony Canyon South Korea)
- 2004: Wings (Scarlet Records/Audioglobe, Soundholic/Tokuma, Nems Argentina, CD Maximum Russia, Evolution South Korea, Rock Empire Taiwan, Renaissance/Koch Epic remastered)
- 2005: Fairytales (Scarlet Records/Audioglobe, Soundholic/Tokuma, CD Maximum Russia, Evolution South Korea, Rock Empire Taiwan, Renaissance/Koch Epic)
- 2007: Divine Gates Part III: The Last Gate (Underground Symphony/Audioglobe, Soundholic/Tokuma, Renaissance/Koch Epic, Rock Empire Taiwan, Melodic Pia KOrea)
- 2012: Twilights of Sand (Media Factory, Moon Records, Underground Symphony)
- 2015: The Storm & the Horizon

=== EPs ===
- 1996: Waiting for the Princess
- 1999: Belzebù

=== Compilations ===
- 1998: After the Storm (Underground Symphony)
- 2005: In the Heart of the Princess (2CD, Scarlet Records/Audioglobe, Soundholic/Tokuma, Evolution South Korea)
- 2013: Divine Gates Part V Chapter I: The Road To The Light (compilation)

=== Live ===
- 2009: Divine Gates Part IV: The Live Gate (Underground Symphony, Soundholic/First, Renaissance/Koch Epic)
