= Kiira =

Kiira may refer to:

== People ==
- Kiira Dosdall (born 1987), American ice hockey player
- Kiira Korpi (born 1988), Finnish figure skater
- Kiira Riihijärvi (born 1997), Finnish golfer
- Kiira Yrjänen (born 2002), Finnish ice hockey player

== Other ==
- Kiira College Butiki, Ugandan school
- Kiira Hydroelectric Power Station, power station in Uganda
- Kiira Motors Corporation, Ugandan company
- Kiira Young FC, Ugandan football club

== See also ==
- Kira (given name)
