= Kiera =

- Gender: female

Origin
- Origin: Gaelic
- Meaning: Dark
- Region of origin: Worldwide

Other names
- Related names: Kira, Ciara

Kiera is a female given name. It is an Anglicized version of Ciara, the name of a 7th-century saint, and means 'dark' or 'dark haired' in Irish.

== People with this name ==
- Kiera Aitken (born 1983), swimmer from Bermuda
- Kiera Allen (born 1997), American actress
- Kiera Austin (born 1997), Australian netball player
- Kiera Azar (born 1997), English novelist and actress
- Kiera Bennett (born 1971), a painter from England
- Kiera Cass (born 1981), American author
- Kiera Chaplin (born 1982), British actress and model
- Kiera Duffy (born 1979), American opera singer
- Kiera Gazzard (born 2001), Australian swimmer
- Kiera Gormley, model from Northern Ireland
- Kiera Hogan (born 1994), American professional wrestler
- Kiera Laney (born 2003), American soccer player
- Kiera Van Ryk (born 1999), Canadian volleyball player
- Kiera Skeels (born 2001), English footballer

== See also ==
- Keira (given name)
- Kira (given name), alternate Anglicization (and name with other origins also)
- List of Irish-language given names
