= Ivan Cavallari =

Ivan Cavallari is a dancer and choreographer and artistic director. He is currently at the head of the artistic direction of Les Grands Ballets Canadiens de Montréal.

== Early life ==
Cavallari was born in Bolzano, Italy. He received his initial training at the Teatro alla Scala Ballet School in Milan. His Ballet teachers noticed his talent and awarded him a scholarship to the Bolshoi Ballet School in Moscow. He was with the Bolshoi Ballet School from 1981 until 1983. Cavallari danced with the Teatro alla Scala Ballet from 1984 to 1985. In 1986, he joined the Stuttgart Ballet. He became a soloist in 1991, advancing to a principal dancer in 1994 under the successive directions of Marcia Haydée and Reid Anderson.

== Career ==
Cavallari's repertoire included leading roles in choreographies by Balanchine, Ashton, Fokine, Béjart, Tetley, Kylián, Forsythe, van Manen, Scholz, Mac Milan, Neumeier, Thoss, Spuck and Lee. He worked with international artists such as Massimiliano Guerra, Alessandra Ferri, Alina Cojocaru, Tamara Rojo, Johan Kobborg et Adam Cooper. He danced all the leading roles of John Cranko's ballets and staged regularly the latter's works with companies such as the Royal Ballet Covent Garden in London, the Teatro alla Scala Ballet, the Czech National Ballet, Prague, the Hungarian National Ballet in Budapest, the Opera di Roma, the Swedish Royal Ballet, the National Ballet of China, the Universal Ballet in Corea and the West Australian Ballet.

Cavallari also staged numerous works by Uwe Scholz. He choreographed ballets for the Stuttgart Ballet, the State Opera Ballet, Hanover, the Lodz State Opera Ballet in Poland, the Mannheim Ballet, the ballet company of the State Opera in Vienna and the State Gallery of Stuttgart which asked him to create a piece for the opening of an exhibition of paintings by Franz Marc. In 2002 he created 'The Last Emperor and I' with the Liaoning Ballet in Schenyang, China and received several rewards.

=== Artistic director ===
Cavallari was the artistic director of the West Australian Ballet in Perth, the oldest company of Australia (created in 1952 by Kira Abrissokova (Bousloff)), from 2007 to 2012. In 2008, his choreography of The Nutcracker received critical acclaim.

Karen van Ultzen, in her article titled "Ivan the Wonderful" (2012), discusses Cavallari's achievement while artistic director of the WA Ballet.

Though he was born in Italy, Cavallari forged most of his career with the Stuttgart Ballet, from where he came directly to join the WAB in 2007. It is his first experience as an artistic director, and his achievements have been considerable... In fact, the WAB's size is another achievement. Cavallari was certainly not the first director to campaign for more dancers at the WAB, but he has been persistent or lucky enough to actually get that for what he asked. When he began his tenure the number was 19 – it is now 36 (32 of them professional).

In 2013 he left Perth for personal reasons.

In 2013, he was appointed artistic director of the Ballet de l'Opéra national du Rhin in Alsace, France, and in 2017 took up the post with Les Grands Ballets Canadiens de Montréal.
