= Nadine Wulffius =

Australian ballet dancer

Madame Nadine Wulffius (1899–1992) was a ballet dancer and choreographer and the founder of her own Ballet School in Maddington, Western Australia.

== Life in Latvia under the Czars ==
Wulffius (née Nadezhda Krivko) was born in Russian ruled Latvia in September 1899 during the reign of the last Romanov Czar Nicholas II. She was the daughter of Fyodor Krivko and Countess Kladiya Alekseyeva-Yaroslavskeya. She recalls in a 1986 Interview with Margita Chudziak the events of her early life.

... I was born in Riga Latvia in 1899. At this time Latvia was part of the Russian Empire. I am from Russian parents. My father was a botanist and historian of Moscow University and my mother was born Countess Alekseyeva Yaroslavskeya. (Her Christian name was Kladiya or Claudia) We lived not far from Riga on an estate and my childhood was most sunny if I can say so. We had governesses and teachers at home. My early childhood was in great surroundings. We had ponies, I rode and we had all that is needed for an ideal childhood. I remember an interesting way in which we were punished if we misbehaved. We had a large dining room with a big fireplace before which stood two great armchairs. At dinner time just before sweets (or dessert) the question was asked "Whoever is under punishment today sit in the chair". We then had to sit in the chair while everyone else ate sweets and nobody was allowed to take pity on us and give us some. On weekends and on Holy Days (of the Church calendar) we were taken to the Theatre. I saw ballet at a very early age. We were also taken to the circus. We had a permanent circus in Riga. There were clowns and girl riders the so-called circus ballerinas. This made a big impression on me especially the riding. I was a good horse rider and after this I started to stand on my horse without a saddle... I would stand on my feet on the horse and it would trot in what was called a roundell. As the horse picked up pace I leaned to the centre to keep balance and I found it was not so difficult to do. Certainly the horse wasn't in a gallop otherwise I would have fallen. So you can see I already as a child had good balance.

== The Imperial Ballet School ==
Wulffius as a child saw "Sleeping Beauty" done in the German style and this made a deep impression on her and she began to desire to be a dancer. Her parents and aristocratic grandmother were opposed to her becoming a Ballet dancer as it was not considered respectable for a girl of noble origins. However she persisted and due to the fact that on her father's side she had a peasant grandfather she was given permission. Wulffius was firstly instructed by Marietta Balbo a famous former dancer with the Italian Ballet who taught private students in her studio in Latvia. She eventually convinced her family to allow her to enrol in the Maryinski Theatre (Imperial Ballet School) in St Petersburg when she was about 12 or 13. Unlike the other students she was able to travel back and forth from her home in Latvia to St Petersburg for extended periods of time.

Wulffius was taught by Maria Anderson in the lower classes and by Olga Preobrajenska in the higher classes. She recalls

... Later in repertoire and character classes we had male teachers. Music was an obligatory subject and we had quite a lot of theoretical subjects and we had marvellous theoretical teachers. The best of all was Khudekov and he taught the history of dance. The influence and memory of him goes through all my life and I am indebted to him for my understanding and love I have for the ballet. For him ballet and dance in general was life lived on a higher level. He taught us to love ballet. He taught us to understand it. He taught us the knowledge we needed when we would come to teaching. That was all thanks to him. He was already very old when he became my teacher. He would have been in his seventies.... His motto was; " We have forgotten to pray to God with our feet. We have forgotten that once in the great past a divine being touched us and we were nearer to God."...

Wulffius remained at the Imperial Ballet School and the Petersburg University until 1922, when she fled Communist Russia for newly independent Latvia.

== A Return to Latvia ==
In Riga she joined the Latvian Theatre where she danced under the name of Mirceva. She also taught at the Riga University. Her dancing name was based on her surname from her first marriage to Mario Marceva–Marcenos a Greek mountain engineer and a son of a Greek Ambassador. This first husband escaped Russia at the time of the Revolution via Vladivostok and sailed around Asia but died off the coast of Constantinople on the way to his parents home in Athens. Her second husband was a German Opera singer called Conrad Henzel.

Wulffius' parents, who are believed to have lived at Ruskulova Manor in the Salnevas area of Latgale, had left Latvia after its independence and returned to Russian territory in Vitebsk and lived hidden among the peasants until the rise of Stalin when they were killed by the Communists. Two of her brothers (Constantine and Nicolai) who had been Czarist officers were sent into battle in the front lines to be killed in a war against Finland. Wulffius also had another brother (Vladimir) and sister (Alexandra) who died when they were children.

Wulffius was friends with the writer Lev Urvancov (Leo Urvantzov) who loosely based his character Vera Mirceva on her and an incident in her life. She would visit Urvancov in Paris until his death in 1929. She strongly disagreed with him about his belief that Anna Anderson was the Grand Duchess Anastasia. Wulffius told her family that she had been a liberal socialist in her younger days as a student whose hope was for Russia to become a democratic constitutional monarchy. The murder of the Tsar and Royal Family which she claimed to have learnt about while travelling on a train shocked her and after this she became anti-communist. In the 1930s she spied on ex-pat communists on behalf of the Latvian government using the name of Vera Mirceva and posing as a Czech socialist. She spied on the communists in Spain during the civil war during her vacations. Wulffius was a follower of Rudolf Steiner and claimed to have visited him in Switzerland in the 1920s. She also recounted a story about a visit to the Karnak Temple in Egypt (probably in the 1930s) when she sailed with a certain Prince on his yacht to Egypt and down the Nile where she had to travel on a donkey as she could not ride the camel. She claimed to have met a group of women from a village who still claimed to preserve some of the ancient dances of Egypt. She later taught these to her ballet students in Australia and the performance was reported in the newspaper.

Her third husband was a Latvian-German Baron Alf-Paul Oscar Wulffius (Vulffius/ Vulfius) of Salnavas, Latvia. He was killed by the Communists during the Second World War (1941). At this time Wulffius was living in Daugavpils and according to her son Paul his father was living with a pianist who was his father's mistress. It seemed to be an amicable arrangement with Wulffius staying with them both when she was in Riga. This may be the Galina Vulfius (b.1912) mentioned as being taken by the communists with Alf-Paul in 1941.

Wulffius also at this time (1941) had a Ballet School in Daugavpils, Latvia. Bernard Levinson mentions her under the name of Madam Mirceva in his article titled "August in Latvia (For Maja Abramowitch)" at the time of the German invasion of Latvia. He uses quotes from the book of a Holocaust survivor Maja Abramovitch titled "To Forgive but not to Forget" (2002).

My Mama teaches me to play the piano. She plays really well. I love sitting on the piano stool with her. Once a week I go with my cousin to Ballet school. It is run by Madam Mirceva. I'm afraid of her. Her hair is smoothed back into a tight ball. It pulls her eyes sideways. Sometimes she looks almost Chinese. She is very strict. My cousin and I are the dolls in the Ballet Coppelia. I love the costumes. Mama had them made especially for us. I am very small for my age. And thin. I think I look like a doll…

Wulffius under the name of N.Mircevas is also mentioned in Daugavpils in 1934, 1936 and 1937 in regards to the Ballet and she (as N. Mirceva) and her Ballet School performances is mentioned again in the same Journal in 1938 and 1939.

Wulffius fled to Germany with her son where she lived until she came to Australia in 1953. Her son Herman Paul Vulfiuss (1924–1998) had come to Australia in 1949 and married a 4th generation Western Australian Beth Lorraine Bartram (1931–2005) from Dumbleyung.

== Life in Western Australia ==
In Western Australia in late 1953 Wulffius met Madame Kira Bousloff of the Western Australian Ballet and they became close friends. Madame Kira speaks of her lovingly in an interview with Michelle Potter in 1990.

...Yes, I have a couple of very friendly friends. Madame Nadine is one, which is a very special one – Madame Wulffius really...First, I thought I'll read you something that I wrote for Madame Nadine, because she is also from the old days of Russia, like my parents, and brings me lots of memories. So this is to Madame Nadine, the date probably was the 1st June, 1983:

We were dreaming, the air was pure, the sun warm. We were dreaming aloud, sitting in the shade. Two generations from a lost country, where King, tradition were gone for ever.

The day you go, those dreams will go with you, and alone I will try to remember and dreams on dreams will grow. They will winding and untwine together, like birds in the wind, and suddenly they will rest beside me. I will remember those dreams we dreamt together, with smile and laughter- never with tears.

The past, the present, the moment to us so dear, will turn its pages as a fairy book where all is beautiful and good. Around us the magic moment will happen, and the ghost of memory will come to us with love and gentleness. We will feel the warmth in our heart, and closeness that nothing could tear apart...

Wulffius founded her own Ballet School in Maddington Western Australia. She ran this school for seven years before handing it over to her close friend Madame Gundi Ferris. She also taught Russian at the University of Western Australia. She was an expert on the History of Dance. She continued until she was 80 to teach Perth's Ballet students the History of Dance and her own unique Ballet head, hand and arm movements (which she said were a cross between the Russian and Italian schools). Wulffius told her family and friends that a certain Estonian dancer had stolen her manuscript on hand movements and gestures and published it under her own name in Estonia. Joan Woods reports that the hand movements were based on those of Ella Ilbak, a famous Estonia solo-dancer and writer who studied in St. Petersburg at the same time as Wulffius. Joan Woods writing on the history of the West Australian Ballet says that Wulffius was one of Kira Bousloff's first helpers and was Ballet mistress of the company for 12 months. Joan Woods also writes:

... Wulffius proved to be formidable as well as charismatic. She developed the spirit of a corps de ballet, beginning teaching relaxation and breath control, body stance, lifting the diaphragm and eye exercises. A specialist of head movements and refined arm movements, she taught one hundred and one port de bras, and prehistoric ritual arm movements of special significance... Each week for most of 1955, she gave classes teaching fluid grace, where she described the smooth arm movements of shaping numbers written in the air. She showed students how to rotate their wrists above their heads, incorporating body movements and using the entire studio floor to write the letters of the alphabet...Dancers felt the most valuable contribution she imparted in her classes was the spiritual element... She was wonderful and extraordinary, generous with her knowledge of theory, running a school, or how to read a contract, but Madame Nadine expected to be heeded...

Around 1979 she moved to live with her granddaughter Mrs Tamara Bartram (née Vulfiuss) at "Hillside" farm in Dumbleyung. She taught German to the students at the local school. Wulffius was fluent in six languages. She died on 6 February 1992 at Dumbleyung and is buried at the Nippering Cemetery near Dumbleyung.
