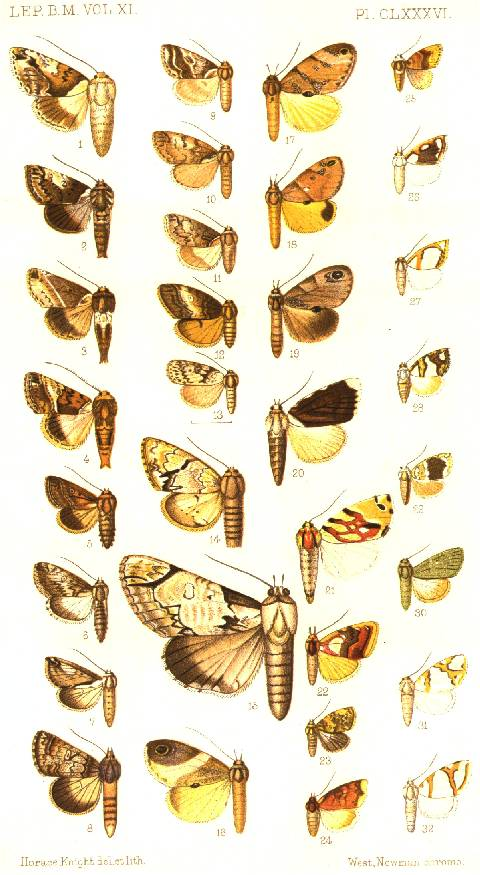
- 16. Cacyparis elegans, Solomons

Scientific classification
- Kingdom: Animalia
- Phylum: Arthropoda
- Class: Insecta
- Order: Lepidoptera
- Superfamily: Noctuoidea
- Family: Nolidae
- Genus: Cacyparis
- Species: C. elegans

Binomial name
- Cacyparis elegans (Butler, 1887)

Synonyms
- Ballatha elegans Butler, 1887

= Cacyparis elegans =

Species of moth

Cacyparis elegans is a moth species in the genus Cacyparis first described by Arthur Gardiner Butler in 1887. It is found in the Solomon Islands.
