= Keira (given name) =

- Pronunciation: /ˈkɪərə/ KEER-ə
- Gender: Female

Other gender
- Masculine: Kieran

Origin
- Origin: Gaelic
- Meaning: Little Dark One
- Region of origin: Worldwide

Other names
- Related names: Ciara, Kiera, Kira

Keira is a feminine given name. It is an Anglicized version of the given name Ciara and means "little dark one". It is associated with Irish or English heritage. The name Keira first appeared in the 1980s, corresponding with the increased interest in traditional baby names among the Irish diaspora, as well as the popularity of film star Keira Knightley.

People named Keira include:

- Keira Bevan (born 1997), Welsh rugby union player
- Keira D'Amato (born 1984), American long-distance runner
- Keira Hewatch (born 1985), Nigerian actress
- Keira Keogh, Irish politician
- Keira Knightley (born 1985), English actress
- Keira Lucchesi (born 1989), Scottish actress
- Keira Maameri (born 1980), French film director
- Keira McLaughlin (born 2000), Canadian curler
- Keira Ramshaw (born 1994), English footballer
- Keira Robinson (born 1994), American basketball player
- Keira Stephens (born 2003), Australian swimmer
- Keira Walsh (born 1997), English footballer
- Saint Cera of Ireland, also spelled Keira, 7th-century abbess

Fictional characters include:

- Keira, a main character from a 2012 CGI animated film Barbie: The Princess & the Popstar
- Keira, a supporting character in the Jak and Daxter series
- Keira Metz, a supporting character and love interest in The Witcher universe.

== See also ==
- Electoral district of Keira
- Kira (given name)
- List of Irish-language given names
- Kieran
