= Dance for the Sun =

Studio album by Kira Willey
- Released: December 1st, 2006
- Recorded: 2006
- Genre: Children's music, folk
- Length: 71:37
- Label: Discmakers

Dance for the Sun, Yoga Songs for Kids, is the self-released 2006 debut album by Kira Willey.

== Background ==
Willey initially began writing music in the forms of lullabies to her daughter. After a few years passed, she started playing the guitar, writing more often, and had begun teaching Yoga classes in New York City to children. The songs for Dance for the Sun were written with her class in mind, and after building up a collection, Willey began using these songs as a musical guide to complement her class, and received positive feedback from both her daughter and her class. When recording the album, Willey enlisted the help of her brother for bass vocals, her cousin for percussion and production, and several of the children in her class to provide vocals, nicknamed the "OmGirls". Dance for the Sun was released on December 1, 2006, in Philadelphia, Pennsylvania.

The album is primarily 15 tracks, the ones which appear first. The remainder are bonus tracks, which are of live recordings in her Yoga class that include children singing along and participating. The booklet contains educational illustrations of Yoga positions and poses that coincide with the bonus tracks.

The song "Colors" was popularized by its use in a Dell computers commercial, called "Portraits". The 31-second commercial showcased the company's laptop model, which featured casing in a variety of colors, presumably to match an aspect of the owner or their personality. This was part of a campaign that Dell ran, which asked consumers "What's your color?".

== Review ==
Professional ratings
Review scores
Source	Rating
Cookie	3/3 stars

Among critics of children's music, Dance for the Sun has received positive reviews, but it is said to be enjoyable by listeners of any age, and in the August 2007, Cookie Magazine said that Dance for the Sun was "joyful, upbeat, and eminently danceable. Willey’s vocals have a breezy coffeehouse quality that will appeal to listeners young and old alike."

Dance for the Sun has won several awards; an Independent Music Award for Best Children's Album, as well as a 2008 Parent's Choice Award. The track Caterpillar Caterpillar has also won an Independent Music Award and a Children's Music Web Award for Best Song.

== Track listing ==
No.	Title	Length
1.	"Dance For the Sun"	2:48
2.	"Let's Go to Work"	1:59
3.	"Black Dog in the River"	1:59
4.	"The Shimmy"	1:45
5.	"The Dancing Mountain"	2:01
6.	"Midnight Moonlight"	2:40
7.	"Caterpillar Caterpillar"	2:17
8.	"Big Brown Bear"	2:01
9.	"Colors"	2:25
10.	"Surfer Mama"	2:47
11.	"The Sound I Found"	2:34
12.	"Making Pie"	3:00
13.	"Namaste Song"	1:34
14.	"Banile"	1:26
15.	"Welcome to Fireflies"	1:31
16.	"Dance For the Sun (yoga track)"	4:33
17.	"Let's Go to Work (yoga track)"	2:17
18.	"Black Dog in the River (yoga track)"	2:36
19.	"The Shimmy (yoga track)"	1:53
20.	"The Dancing Mountain (yoga track)"	2:52
21.	"Midnight Moonlight (yoga track)"	3:15
22.	"Caterpillar Caterpillar (yoga track)"	2:16
23.	"Big Brown Bear (yoga track)"	3:11
24.	"Colors (yoga track)"	2:25
25.	"Surfer Mama (yoga track)"	3:42
26.	"The Sound I Found (yoga track)"	2:31
27.	"Making Pie (yoga track)"	4:32
28.	"Namaste Song (yoga track)"	1:32
29.	"Peace & Joy"	1:15
Total length:		71:37

Information on track listing.

== Personnel ==
- Kira Willey - lead vocals, guitar and violin
- Beau Lisy - drums and percussion
- Matthew Charboneau - bass
- Christopher Burge - saxes & flute

Information on personnel.

== Awards ==
=== Album ===
Award	Category
Independent Music Awards	Best Children's Album (2008)

=== Songs ===
Award	Category	Song
Children's Music Web Awards	Best Song for Preschoolers (2007); Best Recording for Preschoolers ages 3 to 5 (2007)	"Caterpillar caterpillar"
Independent Music Awards	Best Children's Song (2008)	"Caterpillar caterpillar"
International Songwriting Competition	Children's Music Finalist Nomination (2007)	"Caterpillar caterpillar"
Just Plain Folks Music Organization	Children's Song Winners (2009)	"Colors"
Parents' Choice Award	Winner (2007)	"Colors"
Unisong International Song Contest	Children's Top 20 Finalists (2007)	"Surfer Mama"

== Sources ==
- "Cookie Magazine". Cookie. Condé Nast. August 2007. ISSN 1556-410X. OCLC 460710129.
- "New York". Newyorkmetro.com. 41. New York Magazine Co. ISSN 0028-7369. OCLC 1760010.
