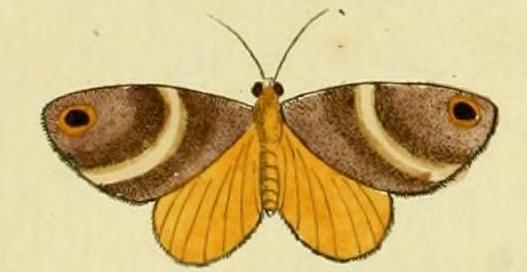

Scientific classification
- Kingdom: Animalia
- Phylum: Arthropoda
- Class: Insecta
- Order: Lepidoptera
- Superfamily: Noctuoidea
- Family: Nolidae
- Genus: Cacyparis
- Species: C. hylaria

Binomial name
- Cacyparis hylaria (Cramer, 1777)

Synonyms
- Phalaena hylaria Cramer, 1777; Cacyparis hilaria

= Cacyparis hylaria =

Species of moth

Cacyparis hylaria is a moth of the family Nolidae first described by Pieter Cramer in 1777. It was described from Suriname.
