= Eilean Munde =

Uninhabited island in Scotland

Eilean Mhunga (Gaelic)
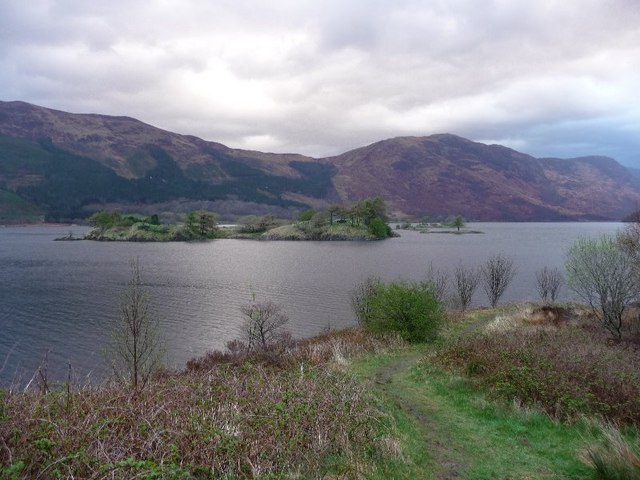
- Eilean Munde in Loch Leven

Location
- Eilean Munde shown within Highland
- Coordinates: 56°41′05″N 5°07′46″W

Administration
- Council area: Highland
- Country: Scotland
- Sovereign state: United Kingdom

Demographics
- Population: 0

Eilean Munde (Scottish Gaelic: Eilean Mhunga) is an uninhabited island in Loch Leven, close to Ballachulish.

It is the site of a chapel built by St. Fintan Mundus (also known as Saint Fintan Munnu), who travelled here from Iona in the 7th century. The church was burnt in 1495 and rebuilt in the 16th century. The last service in the church was held in July 1653.

The island is the site of a graveyard once used by the Stewarts of Ballachulish, the MacDonalds of Glencoe and the Camerons of Callart. The clans shared the island and the maintenance of the graveyard, even when there was conflict between them. The last burial took place in 1972, of Mrs Christina MacDonald Sharpe, a native of Glencoe.

== Eilean a' Chomhraidh ==
Near Eilean Munde (or Mhunna) is a smaller island, Eilean a' Chomhraidh (Eilean na Comhairle) or the Isle of Discussion. This was the meeting-place of those persons who had disputes with their neighbours on the land question, and perhaps on other matters besides. When their disputes had been settled satisfactorily the erstwhile disputants sailed up the loch to Eilean na Bainne (about one-and-a-quarter miles west of Kinlochleven). This is the Isle of Covenant or Ratification; here the agreements were drawn up and sealed. Eilean na Bainne is spelled Ylen na Ban in Timothy Pont's map of the area.

== Visit by Robert Forbes ==
On 6 July 1770 bishop Robert Forbes sailed up Loch Leven. He records:

We likewise come in view of the Island of St. Munde, who was Abbot and Confessor in Argyll ... Upon this island is the ruin of a little chapel, all the four walls of which are still entire, dedicated to the same St. Munde. Though the island has little depth of earth, being rocky, the MacDonalds and Camerons still bury there

In a letter to Stewart of Ballachulish, dated Leith, 15 November 1770, after giving the history of the saint, as in the text, he proceeds:

As the walls of his chapel with you are still standing, and appear to be entire, I would heartily wish that those who still bury on the island would put a roof upon the chapel. Surely they could do it at a small charge, as there is plenty of wood in the country, and that your slate quarry is at hand. In this case I could have worship in it when God may be pleased to favour me with a return to the delightful Bottom of Ballachelish. I would gladly contribute my mite for patching the walls of the chapel and putting on the roof.
