= James Penberthy =

Twentieth century Australian composer and journalist

James Penberthy AM (3 May 1917 – 29 March 1999) was an Australian composer and journalist.

== Biography ==
He was born Albert James Penberthy in Melbourne in 1917. He served with the Royal Australian Navy during World War II. He then studied at the University of Melbourne, where he obtained first class honours in composition. He later studied composition with Nadia Boulanger in Paris, and conducting with Sir John Barbirolli in England. He made his home in Perth, Western Australia, where he founded the West Australian Opera Company and was co-founder of the West Australian Ballet with his third wife, the Monaco-born Russian dancer Kira Bousloff.

In 1975 he moved to the north coast of New South Wales. He founded the School of Arts at Southern Cross University. He died at Maclean, New South Wales, in 1999.

== Works ==
He wrote prolifically in many genres, but is best known for his 22 ballets and 11 operas. Among his most often performed pieces are The Beach Inspector and the Mermaid and Ophelia of the Nine Mile Beach. Many of his works have Australian Indigenous connections: the ballets Euroka (1947), Brolga (1949), Boomerang (1951), The Whirlwind (1954) and Kooree and the Mists (1960) are all based on Aboriginal legends, with Kooree and the Mists being written for Mary Joyce Miller, the first Aboriginal ballet dancer in Western Australia. The operas Larry (1955), The Earth Mother (1958) and Dalgerie (1958) explore the relationships between the Indigenous inhabitants and the European settlers.

Penberthy's Piano Concerto No. 2 (1955) is subtitled "Aboriginal". Julunggul and Kadjari (1957) is a ritual dance for orchestra. His Sextet for flute, oboe, clarinet, horn and two bassoons (1954) employs Aboriginal melodies and rhythms.

== Personal life ==
Penberthy was married four times, all four marriages ending in divorce. He had a son (David) with Dorothy (née Kerin); a son (Richard) to Barbara (née Paterson); a daughter (Tamara Walters) to Kira Bousloff (née Abricossova), co-founder of the West Australian Ballet; and he was also married to Constance (aka Claire) Bramley.

== Honours ==
Penberthy was awarded the degree of Doctor of Music from the University of Melbourne in 1975, and was appointed a Member (AM) of the Order of Australia in 1986.
