= Kiara Laetitia =

Italian-British rock singer and entrepreneur

Kiara Laetitia (real name Chiara Letizia Pernigotti - Tortona June 16, 1979) is an Italian-born rock singer, artist manager, author and mental health advocate. She now lives in London.

== Career ==
She is known for being the vocalist in Skylark from 2003 to 2011 and her solo EP Fight Now with David DeFeis from Virgin Steele. Fight Now reached #15 in the Italian Amazon Music Chart in 2013.

In Japan she is featured in a collection of trading cards together with Ronnie James Dio, Kai Hansen, Marilyn Manson, Kiss, and Metallica. The album The Last Gate reached #3 in the HMV Japan Charts in 2007.

In 2014 she launched Musicarchy Media, a rock and metal record label and management company whose artists include Deadly Circus Fire and Haster.

In October 2017, the album The Last Gate reached the iTunes Top 200 Australian Metal Charts at #28, ten years after its release.

In June 2018 Laetitia releases 7th album Bulletproof, this time with Rockstar Frame.

In December 2019 she releases her book Never Give Up - The Real Secrets of the Music Industry and a calendar to support mental health awareness.

On May 16, 2020, Kiara Laetitia creates Online Female Fest the first virtual all female festival with performances of Lacey Sturm and Share Ross from Vixen among others, which obtained great success worldwide.

In 2024 she makes her comeback as a vocalist with an acoustic cover of Linkin Park's "In the End".

In 2024, Kiara launched her podcast "Women Who Rock the World" with advice and success stories of women who overcame difficulties in the fields of music, entrepreneurship, but also mental health and personal life.

She is now a full-time artist manager, podcaster and vocalist.

== Discography ==
=== With Skylark ===
- Wings (2004)
- In The Heart of the Princess (2005)
- Fairytales (2005)
- Divine Gates Part III: The Last Gate (2007)

=== Live ===
- Divine Gates Part IV: The Live Gate (2009)

=== Solo ===
- Fight Now (2013, Musicarchy Media)
- ‘’The Power of Love ‘’ feat. Sonny Ensabella (2019)
- ‘’In the End (Acoustic Cover) ‘’ (2024)

=== With Rockstar Frame ===
- Bulletproof (Lead and backing vocals. June 15, 2018, Musicarchy Media)

== Guest work ==
Title	With
"Chronicles Of A World Without Gods"	Beto Vazquez Infinity
"Rock N Roll Mafia"	Rockstar Frame

== Books ==
- Never Give Up - The Real Secrets of the Music Industry (2019)

== Fun facts ==
As stated by Alissa White-Gluz in an interview for Bravewords in 2014, Kiara Laetitia was the one who brought her to the ER when she broke her ribs helping her with the medics.
