= Cacyparis insolitata =

Scientific classification
- Kingdom: Animalia
- Phylum: Arthropoda
- Class: Insecta
- Order: Lepidoptera
- Superfamily: Noctuoidea
- Family: Nolidae
- Genus: Cacyparis
- Species: C. insolitata

Binomial name
- Cacyparis insolitata Walker, 1862

Synonyms
- Ballatha atrotumens Walker, [1866]

Species of moth

Cacyparis insolitata is a moth of the family Nolidae first described by Francis Walker in 1862. It is found in India and Sri Lanka.
