= Keira Maameri =

French film director (born 1980)

- Born: c. 1980; Algeria
- Education: University of Paris 8 Vincennes-Saint-Denis
- Years active: Since 2001
- Notable work: Don't Panik (2010), Street Literature (2016)

Keira Maameri (born c. 1980) is a French film director. She directed documentaries exploring the place of artists from underprivileged backgrounds in the French cultural scene.

== Biography ==
Born in Algeria, Keira Maameri's parents immigrated to France when she was one-year-old. She grew up in the working-class banlieue of Longjumeau. Although she qualified her childhood as "normal", she recognized that being schooled in a more privileged neighboring city gave her more opportunities. At a young age, she got interested in cinema and was introduced to hip-hop by her older brother Hamid through his IAM cassette tape.

After her Baccalauréat, her application to the University of Paris 8 Vincennes-Saint-Denis, where she intended to enroll in a cinematography program, was rejected. She organized a sit-in in front of the dean's office and was eventually admitted to the program. She pursued her studies and obtained a Master's degree in cinematography.

While she was still a student, she directed To our missings (2001) a documentary where she explored death and mourning in hip-hop songs.

Hip-hop culture permeates her work, especially her first three documentaries. She said about it: "It's my love for cinema and for hip-hop that got me here today, doing documentaries about MCs or culture. Of course, I don't just talk about hip-hop in my films, but I need to give those artists a platform to speak".

== Notable work ==
- Keep hanging on to our dreams

On s'accroche à nos rêves (2005) translated to Keep hanging on to our dreams is a documentary following four women in the French hip-hop scene: Lady Alézia (graffiti), Dj Pom (deejay), Magali (dance) and Princess Aniès (rap). Maameri gave a different perspective of the male-dominated hip-hop movement, where women are respected for the quality of their work

- Don't Panik

Don't Panik (2010) is "based on an analysis of Muslims rappers" and the apparent contradiction of being a rapper and a Muslim. Islam is part of these rappers' identity, and they refuse to see their music essentialized to Islam. This documentary followed six Muslim rappers from different countries: A.D.L. (Sweden), Duggy Tee (Senegal), Hasan Salaam (United States), Manza (Belgium), Youss (Algeria), and Médine (France). The title is a reference to Médine's album Arabian Panther (2008) and his song Don't Panik.

- Street Literature

Nos Plumes (2016) translated into Street Literature, explores stereotypes fostered by the French cultural elite towards novelists and cartoonists from the Banlieue. Keira Maameri films three novelists, Faïza Guène, Rachid Djaïdani, Rachid Santaki, and two cartoonists, Berthet One and El Diablo. According to Mame-Fatou Niang, Associate Professor at Carnegie Mellon University, this documentary shows that, although these writers and cartoonists are critically acclaimed, their themes are not considered universal by the French media. In fact, they're labeled as banlieue authors, and therefore at the periphery of literature. For Karim Hammou, specialized in the history of rap in France, this documentary illustrates "with sensitivity the dilemmas of a literary activity that confronts forms of particularization, compartmentalization".

== List of documentaries ==
- 2001: À nos absents (45 min) - To our missings
- 2005: On s’accroche à nos rêves (45 min) - Keep hanging on to our dreams
- 2010: Don’t Panik (1h30)
- 2016: Nos plumes (1h23) - Street Literature
