= Avvakir =

Russian masculine given name

Avvakir (Russian: Авваки́р) is an old and uncommon Russian Christian male first name. It derives from the Biblical Hebrew word abba, meaning father, combined with the first name Kir.

Its diminutive is Kira (Ки́ра). The patronymics derived from this first name are "Авваки́рович" (Avvakirovich; masculine) and "Авваки́ровна" (Avvakirovna; feminine).
