= Chiara Neto =

Italian chemist

- Education: University of Florence
- Scientific career
- Workplaces: University of Ulm; Saarland University; Australian National University; University of Sydney
- Website: Neto Lab

Chiara Neto is an Italian Australian chemist and Professor of Physical Chemistry at the University of Sydney. Her research considers functional nanostructures and the design of new materials for sustainable technologies. She is the former President of the Australasian Colloid and Interface Society and was selected as an Australian Research Council Future Fellow in 2018.

== Early life and education ==
Neto studied chemistry at the University of Florence. She remained there for her doctoral studies. Neto moved to the University of Ulm, where she spent a year as a postdoctoral scholar before joining Saarland University. She moved to Australia in 2003, where she spent three years as an Australian Research Council Fellow at the Australian National University.

== Research and career ==
In 2007 Neto was appointed a Lecturer at the University of Sydney, where was promoted to Full Professor in 2020. Her research considers biomimicry and the creation of functional structures inspired by nature.

She has created superhydrophobic surfaces that, imitating a lotus leaf, repel water and keep clean. Such nanostructured materials can be used in situations where repelling liquids and preventing fouling is advantageous, for example, the food industry. In certain scenarios, such as ships moving through water, the flow of fluids against solid surfaces is crucial for performance. By engineering the topography of solid surfaces, Neto can precisely control and study the flow of fluids that interact with them. This allowed Neto to design surfaces layers that allow ships to move efficiently through water, reducing power consumption. Neto has demonstrated that functional coatings can be used to capture atmospheric water from air, reducing humidity and alleviating any water scarcity.

== Awards and honours ==
- 2015 Elected President of the Australasian Colloid and Interface Society
- 2018 Australian Research Council Future Fellowship
- 2018 Sydney Research Accelerator (SOAR) Fellowship

== Select publications ==
- Chiara Neto; Drew R Evans; Elmar Bonaccurso; Hans-Jürgen Butt; Vincent S J Craig (10 October 2005). "Boundary slip in Newtonian liquids: a review of experimental studies". Reports on Progress in Physics. 68 (12): 2859–2897. Bibcode:2005RPPh...68.2859N. doi:10.1088/0034-4885/68/12/R05. ISSN 0034-4885.
- Vincent S. J. Craig; Chiara Neto; Williams DR (17 July 2001). "Shear-dependent boundary slip in an aqueous Newtonian liquid". Physical Review Letters. 87 (5) 054504. Bibcode:2001PhRvL..87e4504C. doi:10.1103/PHYSREVLETT.87.054504. ISSN 0031-9007. PMID 11497777.
- Moira Ambrosi; Luigi Dei; Rodorico Giorgi; Chiara Neto; Piero Baglioni (July 2001). "Colloidal Particles of Ca(OH)2: Properties and Applications to Restoration of Frescoes". Langmuir. 17 (14): 4251–4255. doi:10.1021/LA010269B. ISSN 0743-7463.
