= Ciara (disambiguation) =

Ciara (Ciara Harris, born 1985; pronounced Sierra) is an American singer-songwriter.

Ciara may also refer to:

- Ciara (given name), a popular Irish female name
- Ciara: The Evolution, an album by Ciara (2006)
- Ciara (album), an album by Ciara (2013)
- Jay-Z & Ciara Live, 2009 summer concert tour
- Saint Cera, or Ciara, an Irish abbess in the 7th century
- LÉ Ciara (P42), a patrol vessel in the Irish Naval Service
- Storm Ciara in north-western Europe in February 2020

== See also ==
- Chiara (disambiguation)
- Kiara (disambiguation)
- Kyara (disambiguation)
- Kirara (disambiguation)
