= Kira Willey =

American singer

- Genres: Children's music, folk
- Occupations: Musician, artist, Yoga Instructor
- Instruments: Vocals, guitar, violin, mandolin, fiddle
- Years active: 2006–present

Kira Willey is an American children's music artist, author, children's yoga and mindfulness expert, speaker, and creator of Rockin’ Yoga school programs.

== Early life ==
At the age of five, Willey started playing the violin and continued performing through high school and taught herself how to play guitar and mandolin as a teenager.

She grew up in Connecticut and Massachusetts.

== Career ==
In 2006, she opened a Yoga Studio, Fireflies Yoga in Pennsylvania. PBS TV affiliates nationwide air Breathe With ME and Fireflies Yoga, two kids' yoga programs Willey created and hosts; and her Music You Can Move To series with Laurie Berkner can be heard daily on SiriusXM Radio.

Willey spent the late 1990s in New York City performing in nightclubs before working on material that would later be used for her debut album, Dance for the Sun. The songs initially were written for her daughter, the first of her three children in an effort to sing her to sleep. Upon gaining a certification to teach Yoga, she started bringing her guitar to classes to play for the children. Her students enjoyed the songs she wrote which led her to write more songs with the intention of pleasing children and eventually to recording her first album. Her cousin produced the album and played drums, her brother sang bass, and her daughter and friends sang along in a few tracks. Her music has been described as joyful, upbeat and eminently danceable and she has won awards for best album and best song, and was used as the background for advertisements. She has won two Independent Music Awards and two Children's Music Web Awards for her music and her songs include "Colors," which was featured in a worldwide Dell advertisement campaign. Her most recent release is "Every Voice", winner of Parents Choice Gold. The single "Real Girl," from Every Voice, was given ASCAP's 2018 Joe Raposa Children's Song Award.

Willey speaks at conferences, leads Professional Development days and teacher trainings, and performs Rockin' Yoga Assemblies and Concerts with her band nationwide. She also leads the River Valley Choir, plays fiddle in the not-quite-bluegrass band, Moonshine & Millet, and is a founder of the singing-is-for-everyone experience, Choir & Company!

Willey's children’s mindfulness book, Breathe Like a Bear. has been translated into eleven foreign languages. A second book, Peaceful Like A Panda, will be released early in 2021. She is also the author of a children's mindfulness board book series, Mindfulness Moments for Kids. The first two books, Listen Like an Elephant and Breathe Like A Bear, were released in October 2019, with a third (Bunny Breaths) originally set for an early 2020 release.

== Awards ==
- Independent Music Award: Best Children's Album; Dance for the Sun
- Independent Music Award: Best Song; "Caterpillar Caterpillar"
- 2007 Parents' Choice Award: Best Children's Album; Dance for the Sun
- Children's Music Web Awards: Best Recording for Preschoolers; Dance for the Sun
- Children's Music Web Awards: Best Song; "Caterpillar Caterpillar"

== Discography ==
- Dance for the Sun (2006)
- Kings & Queens of the Forest (2011)
  - Reviewed by Yoga Journal
- How to Be a Cloud (2014)
- Mindful Moments for Kids (2016)
- Every Voice (2018)
