= Cierra Fields =

Native American sexual assault activist (born 1999)

- Born: 1999 (age 26–27); Fort Gibson, Oklahoma
- Citizenship: Cherokee Nation • American
- Education: Fort Gibson High School
- Occupations: activist, journalist

Cierra Fields (born 1999) is an anti-rape activist, Native American community health activist, and citizen of the Cherokee Nation. Fields worked as a freelance journalist for Indian Country Today Media Network.

== Activism ==
Fields is a melanoma survivor and has worked to improve tribal health facilities. In 2013, she was recognized by the White House as a "Champion for Change" for her work to promote healthier living practices and to reduce cancer in Native American communities.

In 2014, as a Cherokee Nation citizen, Fields advocated for the tribal council to raise the age of consent for sex from 14-years-old to 16-years-old.

In 2016, Fields hosted the Charles Head Memorial Native Youth Summit, an alliance to stop violence against Native American women.

In 2018, Fields sat on the board of directors for the National Urban Indian Youth Alliance.

== Awards and recognition ==
=== Awards ===
- 2013 Center for Native American for Youth Champion for Change Award
- 2013 Oklahoma's Governor's Commendation and creation of Cierra Fields Day, on May 9, 2013, for the State of Oklahoma
- 2013 Cherokee Nation Tribal Resolution #13-042 Recognizing tribal citizen, Cierra Fields
- 2014 Cherokee Nation Distinguished Spirit of Life Award Winner
- 2014 President Obama's Volunteer Service Award Winner
- 2015 Prudential Spirit of Community Award-Bronze Award
- 2015 Soroptomist International Violet Richardson Southwest Award Winner
- 2016 Attendee of the White House United State of Women Summit
- 2016 Honoree class of Unity 25 under 25 youth leadership conference
- 2016 United Nations SustainUS Delegate to the United Nations 58th Commission on the Status of Women
- 2016 United State of Women Summit White House Change Maker
- 2017 Recipient of $10,000 Make Sense Foundation college scholarship

=== Honors ===
- 2013-2016 White House Tribal Leaders Conference Cherokee Nation Youth Representative
- 2014-2017 Center for Native American Youth Advisor
- 2014-2016 We R Native National Youth Ambassador
- 2014-2016 National Congress of American Indians Youth Cabinet Member
- 2016-2017 Ralience Youth Board Member
- 2014-2017 White House Tribal Youth Gathering Ambassador
- Guest speaker at the Interfaith Service during the Let Freedom Ring 50th Anniversary of Martin Luther King, Jr.'s historic march on Washington D.C.
