= Wings (Skylark album) =

Studio album by Skylark
- Released: May 17, 2004
- Genre: Power metal
- Length: 52:53
- Label: Scarlet Records

Skylark chronology
The Princess' Day (2001)	Wings (2004)	Fairytales (2005)

Professional ratings
Review scores
Source	Rating
Allmusic	3/5 stars
Rock Hard	2/10 stars
Metal.de	2/10 stars
Scream Magazine	2/6 stars
Heavymetal.dk	6/10 stars
Powermetal.de	

Wings is the sixth album by the Italian power metal band Skylark. It was released in May 2006 by Scarlet Records.

== Track listing ==
1. "Rainbow in the Dark" - 09:07
2. "Summer of 2001" - 05:12
3. "Another Reason to Believe" - 05:26
4. "Belzebú, Part 2" - 09:36
5. "Faded Fantasy" - 03:47
6. "Last Ride" - 09:00
7. "A Stupid Song" - 05:53
8. "When Love and Hate Collide" (Def Leppard cover) - 04:22
9. "Crystal Lake/Skylark" (Remaster) - 7:04 (bonus track)
10. "Was Called Empire" (Remaster) - 4:57 (bonus track)

== Personnel ==
- Fabio Dozzo - Vocals
- Eddy Antonini - Keyboards
- Roberto "Brodo" Potenti - Bass
- Fabrizio "Pota" Romani - Guitar
- Carlos Cantatore - Drums
- Kiara - Vocals
