= Kira Makarova =

American evolutionary biologist

- Born: 1966 (age 59–60)
- Education: Moscow Medical Institute, Novosibirsk State University, Institute of Cytology and Genetics of the Russian Academy of Sciences in Novosibirsk (doctorate 1996)
- Known for: Research on the biology of CRISPR and Cas9
- Scientific career
- Fields: Evolutionary biology
- Workplaces: Uniformed Services University of the Health Sciences, National Center for Biotechnology Information

Kira S. Makarova (Russian: Кира Макарова) is an American evolutionary biologist known for her research on the biology of CRISPR and Cas9. She is a staff scientist at the National Center for Biotechnology Information.

== Early life and education ==
Makarova grew up in Narva, then part of the Soviet Union and later in Estonia, and competed at the national level in the Soviet Biology Olympiad. After completing high school she tried unsuccessfully for several years to enter Moscow State University. She instead entered the Moscow Medical Institute, but after marrying and having a child she moved to Novosibirsk State University to be closer to her husband's family. There, the shortages of laboratory supplies led her to work in computational biology. She completed a master's degree in 1991, and in 1996 completed a doctorate at the Institute of Cytology and Genetics of the Russian Academy of Sciences in Novosibirsk. Her work at the institute involved the design of synthetic oligonucleotides and, separately, the use of oligopeptide frequency data to classify proteins.

== Later career and research ==
When Makarova's husband moved to the US to work with Eugene Koonin in the National Center for Biotechnology Information, Koonin found Makarova a position as research fellow at the Uniformed Services University of the Health Sciences, studying Deinococcus radiodurans, a bacterium that can survive several different extreme conditions. In 2001, Koonin hired Makarova to join him at NCBI. At the center, beginning in 2006, Makarova and her co-workers investigated the CRISPR-Cas9 system and its biological function as a bacterial immune system. Interest in the system heightened after other researchers subsequently used it to perform genome editing.

Makarova's ongoing research involves comparative genomics, and the genetics and protein functions of archaea. She is the maintainer of a database of archaeal proteins and their relations.

== Notable publications ==
- Zetsche, Bernd; Gootenberg, Jonathan S.; Abudayyeh, Omar O.; Slaymaker, Ian M.; Makarova, Kira S.; Essletzbichler, Patrick; Volz, Sara E.; Joung, Julia; van der Oost, John; Regev, Aviv; Koonin, Eugene V.; Zhang, Feng (2015). "Cpf1 Is a Single RNA-Guided Endonuclease of a Class 2 CRISPR-Cas System". Cell. 163 (3). Cell Press: 759–771. doi:10.1016/j.cell.2015.09.038. ISSN 0092-8674. PMC 4638220. PMID 26422227. S2CID 3628765.
  - – Cited by
    - Adli, Mazhar (2018). "The CRISPR tool kit for genome editing and beyond". Nature Communications. 9 (1) 1911. Nature Portfolio. Bibcode:2018NatCo...9.1911A. doi:10.1038/s41467-018-04252-2. ISSN 2041-1723. PMC 5953931. PMID 29765029. S2CID 21692417.
    - Anzalone, Andrew V.; Koblan, Luke W.; Liu, David R. (2020). "Genome editing with CRISPR–Cas nucleases, base editors, transposases and prime editors". Nature Biotechnology. 38 (7). Nature Portfolio: 824–844. Bibcode:2020NatBi..38..824A. doi:10.1038/s41587-020-0561-9. ISSN 1087-0156. PMID 32572269. S2CID 21692417.
