= Ciara McAvoy =

Scottish artist

- Education: Diplôme Supérieur d'Art Plastique
- Alma mater: École Nationale Supérieure des Beaux-Arts
- Occupation: Film poster artist
- Website: www.ciaramcavoy.com

Ciara McAvoy is a Scottish artist who primarily creates hand-drawn film posters using oil paint. Her work has been used by a wide variety of movie studios and production companies for modern films like X-Men: First Class and Filth. She has also painted posters for classic film series like Star Wars and Indiana Jones.

McAvoy has won numerous awards for her work in the film industry, including a Davey Award and a Creativity International Award for her Filth poster in 2014 and five total Communicator Awards in 2015 for Filth, X-Men, and Star Wars Revenge of the Sith. Her current work includes projects for the film Enemy of Man and Victor Frankenstein.

== Early life and education ==
McAvoy is a native of Glasgow, Scotland and started drawing at the age of 8, selling her first oil painting by the time she was 12 years old. Her grandfather, who studied at Montmartre, was an early inspiration in her artistic endeavours. McAvoy also cites films like Star Wars and other poster artists like Tom Jung, John Alvin, and Richard Amsel for spurring her interest in movie art.

McAvoy attended the École Nationale Supérieure des Beaux-Arts in Paris. To fund her schooling, she worked at a local cinema as an usher and, later, a projectionist. After work, McAvoy would go home and paint scenes from the films she'd watched earlier in the day. Some of those early paintings were used as posters at the cinema where she worked. Upon finishing her schooling, McAvoy received a Diplôme Supérieur d'Art Plastique.

== Career ==
Because McAvoy's early posters were successful, she decided to pursue a career in movie poster design. Despite the fact that most movie posters after the 1990s were created digitally or with photographs, McAvoy believed that more "traditional" types of movie posters could prove to be successful. She submitted some of her work to magazines and was published almost immediately. She was also contacted by LucasFilm, which asked to see her portfolio. Rick McCallum, who produced the second Star Wars trilogy has some of McAvoy's art hanging in his home. McAvoy paints primarily with oils, but also has created works using acrylic, watercolor, graphite, charcoal, and pastels.

Most of McAvoy's work that is used as actual promotional material is featured in Europe, because US markets are less receptive. However, her artwork for the Scottish film Filth was used for the movie's American promotional campaign and she has also worked on promotional campaigns for films like X-Men: First Class. While some of the films for which McAvoy is commissioned feature actor James McAvoy, the two have no immediate familial relation. McAvoy received multiple awards for her work on the film.

McAvoy's most recent work is for the Paul McGuigan film Victor Frankenstein."Alex Simon" Scheduled for release in November 2015, McAvoy created the alternative movie poster for the film.

== Selected works ==
Date	Project	Notes
1989	Indiana Jones and the Last Crusade	Anniversary poster
1991	Robin Hood: Prince of Thieves	
1996	The Empire Strikes Back	Anniversary poster
1996	Mission: Impossible	
2005	Star Wars: Episode III – Revenge of the Sith	
2011	X-Men: First Class	Official promotional material
2013	Filth	Official American promotional material
2014	Kaleidoscope Man	Associate Producer
2015	Enemy of Man	Associate producer, official movie poster
2015	Victor Frankenstein	Alternative movie poster

== Awards and recognition ==
In 2014, McAvoy was an award winner in the 44th Creativity International Print & Packaging Design Awards for her work on the film Filth. The same year, she received a Davey Award for the Filth movie poster from the Academy of Interactive and Visual Arts. At the 2015 Communicator Awards in Beverly Hills, California, McAvoy won a total of five awards, being recognized for her work with Star Wars: Revenge of the Sith, X-Men and Filth.
