= Kira Peikoff =

American novelist

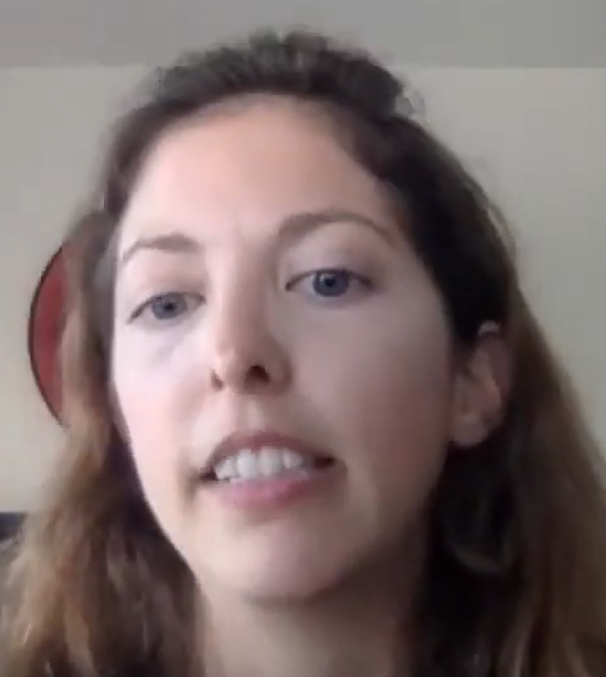
- Peikoff in 2020
- Born: Kira Lily Peikoff; May 21, 1985 (age 41)
- Education: New York University (BA); Columbia University
- Occupations: Novelist, journalist
- Spouse: Matthew Seth Beilis (m. 2012)
- Writing career
- Period: Late 2000s–present
- Genre: Thriller
- Website: KiraPeikoff.com

Kira Lily Peikoff (/ˈpiːkɒf/; born May 21, 1985) is a journalist and novelist, based in New York City.

== Personal life ==
Kira Peikoff was born to Objectivist scholar Leonard Peikoff and his then-wife Cynthia Pastor Peikoff, a psychotherapist in private practice. She was named after the protagonist of Ayn Rand's We the Living. She grew up in Irvine, California, being home-schooled and then attending Woodbridge High School. In 2007, she graduated with a Bachelor of Arts honours degree in journalism from New York University. She married Matthew Beilis, a musician, in 2012.

== Career ==
During her undergraduate internships, Peikoff wrote about Congressional politics for the Orange County Register and about business and technology for Newsday. She also researched feature stories for New York magazine and wrote for the New York Daily News.

After graduation, Peikoff worked as an editorial assistant for Henry Holt and Company and for Random House. Since 2013, she has worked as a freelance journalist on health and science, having written articles for The New York Times, Slate, Salon, Cosmopolitan, The Atlanta Journal-Constitution, Psychology Today and The Hastings Center Report.

When Peikoff was 13 years old, Gone with the Wind inspired her to become a novelist. In 2008, Peikoff finished writing her debut novel, Living Proof, having taken a year off after university to write it; the book was published in February 2012. Inspired by her disgust toward President George W. Bush's opposition to stem-cell research, Living Proof is a dystopian thriller set in a future time when embryo destruction is legally considered first-degree murder and fertility clinics are severely regulated by the government. The novel received largely positive reviews, among them a mildly positive review by Publishers Weekly, a mildly negative review by Kirkus Reviews, and positive reviews by Suspense Magazine and Mystery Scene magazine.

No Time to Die, a second biomedical thriller by Peikoff, was published in September 2014, receiving mildly positive reviews by the Romantic Times and NJ.com.

Peikoff is a member of the International Thriller Writers, Mystery Writers of America, and the American Society of Journalists and Authors.

She was also the founding editor-in-chief of the science publication Leaps.org, which was later acquired by Bayer. Peikoff continues to work for Bayer as Deputy Director of Innovations Communication and CEO Positioning.

== Bibliography ==
- Living Proof (2012)
- No Time to Die (2014)
- Die Again Tomorrow (2015)
- Mother Knows Best (2019)
- Baby X (2024)
