= West Australian Ballet =

Ballet company in Perth, Western Australia

West Australian Ballet (WAB) is the state ballet company of Western Australia and is based at the Western Australian Ballet Centre in Maylands, an inner suburb of Perth. Founded in 1952 by Kira Bousloff (formerly of the Ballets Russes), it is the oldest ballet company in Australia.

WAB artistic directors have included Garth Welch (1979–83) and Ivan Cavallari (2007–12). The current, interim artistic director is former Australian Ballet principal and artistic director, David McAllister. Choreographers who have produced dances for WAB include Krzysztof Pastor, David Nixon, Greg Horsman, Graeme Murphy, Stephen Baynes, Adrian Burnett, Gideon Obarzanek, Stephen Page and Natalie Weir, Jacqui Carroll, Chrissie Parrott and Garth Welch.

WAB performs with the West Australian Symphony Orchestra. At present the company consists of 34 full-time dancers and six 'young artists' (a full-time year-long development programme), structured since 2014 with principal dancers, soloists, demi-soloists and corps de ballet. WAB performs three to four major seasons in Perth a year, one at the Quarry Amphitheatre in City Beach, the others usually at His Majesty's Theatre, Perth and Heath Ledger Theatre at the State Theatre Centre of Western Australia (although Burswood Theatre and Regal Theatre have also played hosts). They also tour throughout regional Western Australia, nationally and internationally, and provide choreographic workshops, an education program and other community activities.

== Early days ==
Bousloff had travelled as a ballerina with the Ballets Russes to the east coast of Australia in 1938. She settled in Melbourne after her commitment to the Ballets Russes was complete, later moving to Perth with her second husband, composer James Penberthy. She fell in love with the city, declaring that the beautiful coastline reminded her of the French Riviera and later stated,

when I came to the airport in little Perth at the end of the world, I put my feet on the ground, I looked around and I said loudly and strongly, 'This is where I'm going to live, and this is where I'm going to die ... this is my place' [...].

She put together a corps de ballet and choreographed sequences for Perth Metropolitan Operatic Society's production of The Gypsy Baron (conducted by Penberthy), and the following year held an open meeting of dancers and teachers to discuss establishing a major ballet company. Response was good, but there were no finances to support the venture until Eric Edgley, who ran His Majesty's Theatre as a private commercial enterprise, put up £A 400, equivalent to A$41,521 in 2022, for the first production.

During the first 15 years of the company, Bousloff presided as artistic director, battling against financial constraints. Access to funds with inconsistent, and dancers sometimes performed without being paid. It was not until 1968–1970 when professional dancers, administrative staff and permanent headquarters were put into place. To begin with, rehearsals were held at Old Perth Boys School (now Perth Institute of Contemporary Arts) before moving to the West Australian Rowing Club, and then the first floor of the Grand Theatre (corner of Murray and Barracks Street) in 1955. In 1968, they transferred into King Street.

In the early days of WAB, Bousloff was assisted by her Russian friend Nadine Wulffius, who also was briefly president of WAB before Mr Edwards.

In 1986, Wulffius stated:

My first encounter with [... WAB] was very early in 1953 the year I arrived in Perth. Perth was at this time a very distant and sleepy town without the cultural life that we were used to in Europe. There was no permanent theatre. There was no permanent musical society or other such cultural and artistic organisations. When in November my relations told me that there was a Western Australian ballet company and they were to have a performance I was very surprised. I certainly had to go. It was on 15th November 1953. I went to His Majesty's Theatre and there was the performance. It was called Graduation Ball and in it were some gypsy dancers and scenes. I was very surprised to find in Graduation Ball and some other selected small numbers great similarity to the kind of Ballet-style I was used to in Europe. The similarity of the choreography of this school to my own school was because the choreographer Mrs Bousloff had been taught by the same teacher as me, Olga Preobrasjenska. Mrs Bousloff was firstly taught by Olga after I had finished being taught by her. So the age difference between us was very large. [Wulffius was 16 years older than Bousloff.] I was pleased to learn this about Mrs Bousloff and wanted to get acquainted with her. After a while I did go and make her acquaintance and we became friends.

I did not give regular lessons at her studio, but I helped her with advice and with the corrections of her productions. By the way she was an excellent producer. And the first one I worked with her on was Cinderella and the music was by James Penberthy ... It was not a very big company but it was big enough to put on small ballets....We worked slowly with performances but the company was not officially registered. It took us a few years until the company became registered, which was in 1957. (Note: Registration was in 1959.) During this time the company didn't have many performances because there was no government subsidy and all our dancers were working without a salary [...].

— Nadine Wulffius

== 1970s and 1980s ==
In 1969, Rex Reid took over as artistic director as the company became established as the state ballet company. In 1970, moving to North Fremantle Town Hall, where they remained until 1980, nine dancers received full-time contracts. In the same year the company also went on its first international tour to New Guinea. Luis Moreno succeeded Reid as artistic director in 1973, followed by Robin Haigin 1977, Garth Welch in 1979 and Barry Moreland in 1983. Moreland went on to remain in the position for 15 years.

Although the company continued to develop both its repertoire and technical and performance standards for the dancers, as well as enjoying many successes, the financial strains on the company also continued to grow. At times during the 1980s, there were doubts the company could continue.

Despite this, in 1986 an agreement between the Government of Western Australia and the Australian Broadcasting Corporation secured the orchestral services of the West Australian Symphony Orchestra for performances, a relationship that continues as of 2025. In 1980 the company moved to the newly refurbished His Majesty's Theatre which remained its performance, rehearsal and administrative home until 2012 when rehearsals and administration were moved to the West Australian Ballet Centre in Maylands. In 1981, Garth Welch's world premiere of Peter Pan gave WAB its very first sell-out season.

== 1990s ==
In 1990 the company established a national and international touring program. Early tours included China, Japan and the Philippines, and since then has continued to tour in South-East Asia and within Australia. Moreland's time as artistic director heralded the beginning of a series of high-profile collaborations including visual artist Charles Blackman and choreographer Chrissie Parrott.

== 2000s ==
Ted Brandsen took the helm as artistic director in 1998 and won the Australian Dance Award for choreography in 2000 for his Carmen which was later recorded and sold by ABC Television. Artistic director Judy Maelor-Thomas was appointed in 2001, followed by Simon Dow in 2003.

In 2007 Ivan Cavallari was appointed artistic director and efforts started to be made to increase the facilities and size of the company. By 2012, WAB had moved into the new West Australian Ballet Centre in Maylands and increased the company from 19 full-time dancers to 32, enabling it to perform the best of classical repertoire including Onegin in 2013. Other major productions included Marcia Haydée's Sleeping Beauty (marking WAB's debut at the Burswood Theatre and having a cast of over 80), Gala (with guest principal artists from The Royal Ballet, Stuttgart Ballet and The Australian Ballet) and John Cranko's Taming of the Shrew.

In 2013, Cavallari left to return to Europe and Aurelien Scannella was appointed the new artistic director, his first year of programming beginning in 2014. Scannella expanded the company's repertoire with new versions of Radio and Juliet (a play on Romeo and Juliet, set to Radiohead), Cinderella, Beauty and the Beast, and Great Gatsby.

In 2016 WAB premiered a re-staged version of the traditional production of Nutcracker, choreographed by principal dancer Jayne Smeulders, Sandy Delasalle, and Aurelien Scannella with design by Charles Cusick Smith and Phil Daniels.

== 2024 ==
In 2024, David McAllister joined WAB as guest artistic director.

== West Australian Ballet Centre ==
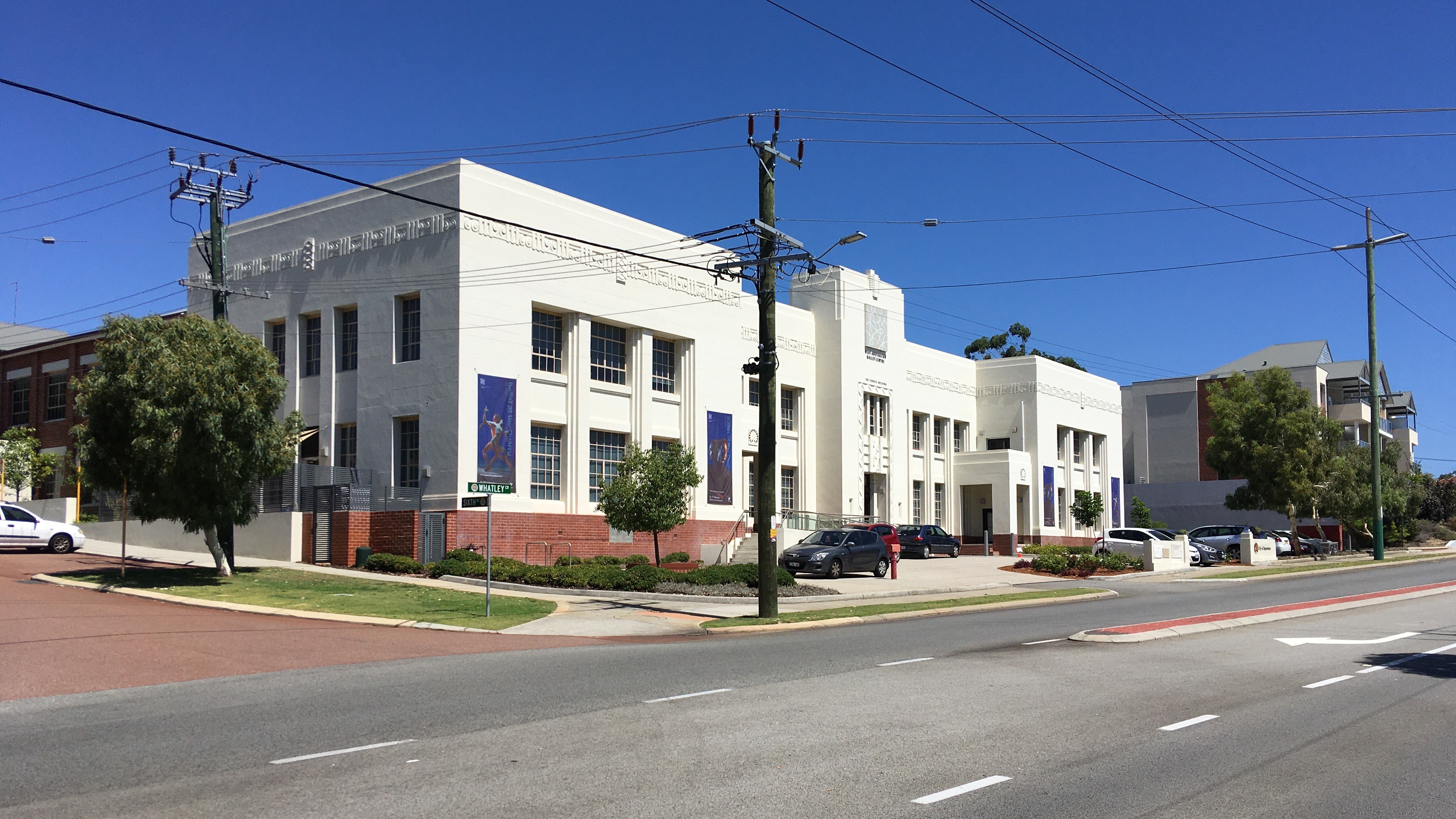
West Australian Ballet Centre, Maylands

In April 2012, during WAB's 60 year celebrations, the company moved all operations and rehearsals to the West Australian Ballet Centre in Maylands. The Forrest Building, a heritage listed building, is owned by the City of Bayswater and leased long-term to the company.

The history of the building dates back to 1897 when the Victoria Institute and Industrial School for the Blind was developed as part of the celebrations for the 60th year of Queen Victoria's reign. The institute originally consisted of a complex of buildings which included a factory, workshops and residential facilities. The federation warehouse style of architecture, characterised by its hipped galvanized iron roof and protruding brick piers and plinths, can still be seen on the Sixth Avenue side of the building. The institute was officially opened in 1900 and was the only purpose designed and built centre of its kind in Western Australia.

The institute derived income from chair caning, mat and brush making but was heavily reliant on public donations and government grants. After World War I, production increased and the centre proved to be a significant place of assistance for service men that had lost their sight during the war. In 1923, production expanded to include basket making and sea grass furniture. The building was renamed the West Australian Institute and Industrial School for the Blind, but by 1936 was faced with severe overcrowding and workers started refusing to work in the harsh conditions.

To rectify the situation, in 1937 the Lotteries Commission and the Government of Western Australia contributed to the expansion of the building – adding to and encompassing the existing infrastructure to create the L-shape which remains today. The style of inter-war stripped classical (with art deco influences) is seen on the front, Whatley Crescent, face of the centre.

During World War II, the institute was again affected, with workers supporting the war effort by working 10 days for 9 days' pay and producing nets and baskets for the military. In 1948, Helen Keller visited and was appalled by the industrial conditions in which the blind children were being educated, leading to significant changes. By the 1960s a new residential building was started and the ground level was converted into a showroom for the goods. In 1967, the centre was granted a royal charter and became the Royal WA Institute for the Blind. "Cane City" the mat shop and retail store was closed in 1989 when it could no longer compete with cheap imports.

In 2001, the institute amalgamated with the WA Deafblind Association to form the Senses Foundation and in 2004 it was decided to close the institute and sell the premises. The building remained unoccupied, except for squatters, for several years before WAB decided it would make the ideal location.

The building now includes three dance studios on level 1, called Wesfarmers Salle, Michael John Maynard Wright Salle and Friends of WAB Salle, as well as one studio on the ground floor. Also upstairs is the Green Room, a shoe storeroom, male and female change rooms, and a physical therapy and Pilates room. Wesfarmers Salle (also called Studio 1) is the largest of the three and has the facilities to host intimate performances seating approximately 140 persons. The ground levels consists of administration offices, production offices, wardrobe department and foyer and entertaining areas. The facilities are available for hire, and since opening has played hosts to weddings, fashion shows, corporate events, musical show rehearsals, dance exams, television and theatre auditions, and board meetings.
