= Kira Bousloff =

Russian-Australian ballet dancer

Kira Abricossova Bousloff OAM (1914–2001) was a dancer with Ballets Russes who toured Australia in 1938 and stayed, divorcing first husband Serge Bousloff then marrying (and divorcing) James Penberthy while having a significant influence on the evolution of ballet in Western Australia.

Born Kira Abricossova in Russia, the child of an aristocratic Russian family who were stranded in Monte Carlo by the 1917 Russian Revolution, she was raised in France, taking lessons from Russian émigrés.

She established West Australian Ballet in Perth (1952) and founded a ballet school which continues to this day.

A number of significant Australian dancers came through the school, including Stephen Heathcote.

In recognition of her contributions to Australian Ballet she was awarded a Medal of the Order of Australia (OAM) in 2000. She was the recipient of an Australia Dance Award for lifetime achievement in 2000. Made a Western Australian State Living Treasure 1998
