= Ciera Rogers =

American fashion designer

- Born: Ciera Nannette Rogers; February 25, 1989 (age 37); Houston, Texas
- Occupations: Fashion designer, business owner
- Years active: 2012–present
- Known for: Babes and Felines
- Website: www.shopbabes.com

Ciera Rogers (born February 25, 1989) is an American business owner and fashion designer.

== Early life ==
Rogers was born and raised in Houston, Texas to a mother of Creole heritage and a father of African-American descent. Rogers grew up with her mother and sister and has openly talked about being homeless, living with relatives or living in government funded homes.

Her mother Zoe Jackson is a jazz and R&B singer-songwriter, inspired by Billie Holiday, Sarah Vaughn, and Shirley Horn. In 1997, she was a background vocalist for Patti LaBelle.

== Career ==
In 2009, Rogers received her bachelor's degree in Communications from the University of Houston. From 2009 to 2012, Rogers worked as a Public Relations Specialist and Wardrobe Stylist in Houston, Texas.

Her fashion work was featured in the October 2012 issue of Vogue Italia.

In 2012, Rogers moved to Los Angeles and opened her own online vintage store, taking inspiration from her mother who owns Fashion Plate, a vintage boutique in the Montrose area of Houston, Texas.

Rogers is the creator and CEO of the clothing line Babes and Felines, which launched in 2013. She started Babes and Felines in response to her own frustration with the lack of figure-hugging clothing for curvy women.

Ciera Rogers has been featured as "the designer to watch" in media outlets including Galore, Black Enterprise, NY Post, FOX News, Elle South Africa and others.

She credits Quentin Tarantino as one of her biggest inspirations.
