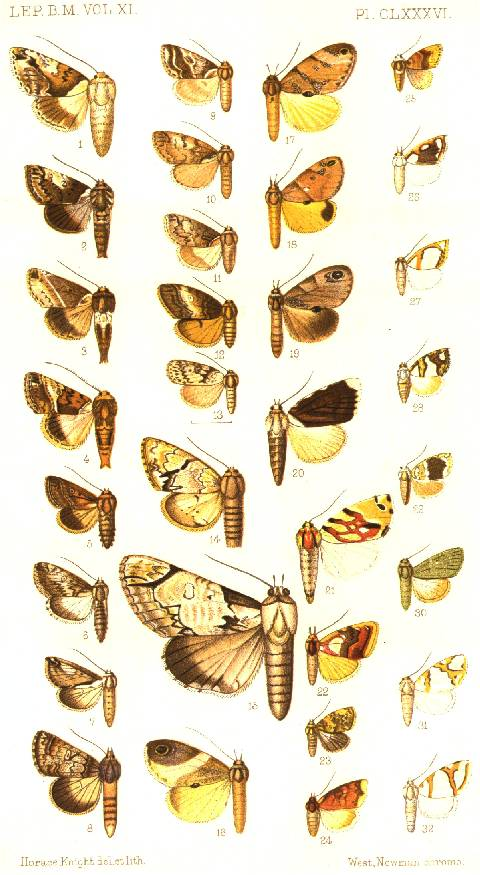
- 16. Cacyparis elegans

Scientific classification
- Kingdom: Animalia
- Phylum: Arthropoda
- Class: Insecta
- Order: Lepidoptera
- Superfamily: Noctuoidea
- Family: Nolidae
- Genus: Cacyparis; Walker, [1863]

= Cacyparis =

Genus of moths

Cacyparis is a genus of moths in the family Nolidae erected by Francis Walker in 1863. It is found in throughout India, Sri Lanka, Myanmar, Papua New Guinea and Australia.

== Description ==
Its palpi are upturned and the third joint is very long, slender and knobbed at the end. The antennae are fasciculate (bundled) in the male. Forewings are broad with acute apex. Veins 3 to 5 from near angle of cell, vein 6 from upper angle and vein 9 arising from vein 10 and anastomosing with vein 8 to form the areole. Hindwings with veins 3 and 4 from angle of cell, vein 5 above the angle, veins 6 and 7 from upper angle and vein 8 from before the middle of the cell.

== Species ==
- Cacyparis atrotumens Walker 1865
- Cacyparis brevipennis Warren 1916
- Cacyparis ceira Swinhoe 1901
- Cacyparis cyclops Hampson 1905
- Cacyparis elegans Butler 1887
- Cacyparis hylaria Cramer 1779
- Cacyparis insolitata Walker 1862
- Cacyparis melanolitha Turner 1909
- Cacyparis punctigera Linnaeus 1758
- Cacyparis rectilineata Warren 1916
- Cacyparis tenuipalpis Snellen 1880
