= Fintán of Taghmon =

Saint Fintán
- Born: Ireland
- Died: 635
- Venerated in: Catholic Church; Church of Ireland; Eastern Orthodox Church
- Feast: 21 October
- Influences: Abbot Sinell at Cluain-inis

Saint Fintán, or Munnu (died 635) is one of the saints of Ireland and Britain who served in Ireland and Scotland, being the founder and abbot of the abbey at Teach-Mhunn (The House of Saint Munn), where his bed may be visited and is a pilgrimage site; today Taghmon is in the County Wexford, in the province of Leinster, Ireland. In Scotland, he is venerated as the patron saint of Clan Campbell.

== Alternate names ==
He was known in Ireland as St Fintán or St Munnu. In Scotland, he was recorded as St Mun, St Munn, St Munda, St Mundas and St Mund. The name Fionn was preceded by the term of endearment 'mo', followed by "og", meaning "young". Mo-Fhionn-Og became Munno, the name by which he is popularly known.

== Biography ==
=== Early life ===
Based on certain linguistic characteristics and some historical references, the earliest life of Fintán/Munna is believed to date around the year 800.

Fintán was born of the dynasty of Niall, son of Tulchan (or Tulcan) and Feidelmia. According to the Felire of Oengus, Tulchan was a druid.

Fintán may have first studied at the school of Bangor Abbey under St. Comgall, and later in the school of Kilmore Deathrib. It is more certain that he studied 18 years under the abbot Sinell, son of Maynacur, at Cluain-inis in Lough Erne. St. Columba also studied at Cluain-inis under Sinell, but left prior to Munnu's arrival.

=== Ministry in Scotland ===
==== Iona monastery ====
Fintán arrived in Scotland in 579 A.D. He was said to be assisted by two wolves in guarding his sheep.

In 597, Fintán resolved to go to Í (now called Iona) to join the monastery there under St. Columba. Just before his departure, news reached him that St. Columba had died and that St. Baithen had succeeded him. Undeterred, Fintán made the journey and applied to St. Baithen for reception into the community. Munnu responded "humbly" as St. Baithen made the customary inquiries into his background. However, when Munnu requested to be admitted as a monk, Baithen replied:

" I thank my God, that you are come to this place; but this you must know: that you cannot be a monk of ours." Fintan much afflicted at these words said; "Is it that I am unworthy of being one?" "No" answered Baithen, "but, although I should be very glad to keep you with me, I must obey the orders of my predecessor Columba, who some time ago said to me in the spirit of prophecy; Baithen remember these words of mine; immediately after my departure from this life, a brother, who is now regulating his youthful age by good conduct, and well versed in sacred studies, named Fintan, of the race of MocuMoie, (74) and son of Failchan, will come to you from Ireland (Scotia) and will supplicate to be reckoned among the monks. But it is predetermined by God, that he is to be an abbot presiding over monks, and a guide of souls. Do not therefore let him remain in these islands of ours, but direct him to return in peace to Ireland (Scotia), - that he may there establish a monastery in a part of Leinster not far from the sea, and labour for the good of souls."

==== Kilmun monastery ====
Mun lived on the Island on Loch Leven, before making his way to Kilmun, where he founded a monastic community at the site of the modern Kilmun Church.

=== Ministry in Ireland ===
==== Wexford monastery ====
Fintán returned to Ireland shortly thereafter to found his monastery. A local lord in what is modern-day Wexford in Leinster, named Dímma mac Áeda Croin, granted Fintán land circa 597. Munnu, in turn, granted, Dímma his personal guarantee that Dímma would gain the kingdom of heaven. Fintán at some point took Dímma's son into foster care, and Dímma later became a cleric and was buried among the monks at the monastery. The monastery was named Teach-munnu or "House of Munnu" and became a centre of learning. Fintán was versed in scientific knowledge and gave frequent public lectures where Christian revelation was illuminated by the sciences and mathematics. Munnu presided over 152 monks at Teach-munnu. Munnu probably founded a religious establishment at "Kilmund" (Kilmun). and may have done so at Eilean Munde as well. However, it is improbable that he is the founder of Clonenagh, Fintan of Clonenagh, though they are often confused. He did have an abbey in Heli (or Hele, perhaps in County Westmeath), which he and his monks forsook, giving it to Saint Cera and her companions. Saint Cera named the place, according to Fintán's instructions, after St. Telle who had given three jubilations in the plain of Miodhluachra that day. There are several references to Munnu being a leper.

==== Later life ====
Toward the end of his life, he opposed the adoption of the Roman method for determining the date of Easter in opposition to Laserian. A synod convened at Magh Lene in 631 to resolve the matter, but the parties were unable to resolve the matter so a delegation was sent to Rome. Munnu withdrew his opposition and adopted the Roman system with the rest of southern Ireland.

=== Death and burial ===
He died in 636, and was buried in the cemetery at St Munn's Parish Church, Kilmun, Scotland.

== Veneration as a Saint ==
His feast day is on 21 October. Fintán is associated with several tales of miracles and is recorded to have been visited by an angel.
