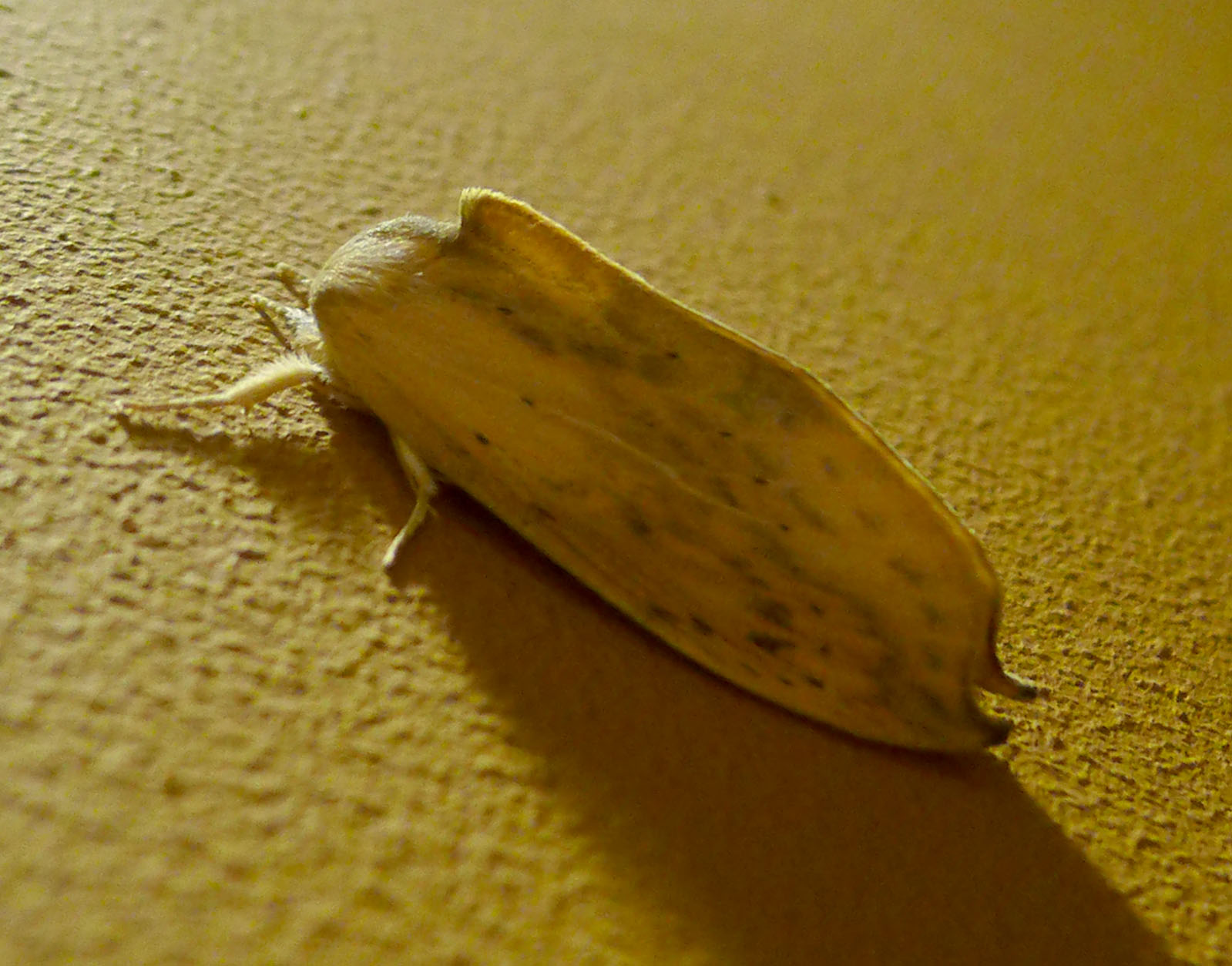

Scientific classification
- Kingdom: Animalia
- Phylum: Arthropoda
- Clade: Pancrustacea
- Class: Insecta
- Order: Lepidoptera
- Superfamily: Noctuoidea
- Family: Notodontidae
- Genus: Norraca
- Species: N. longipennis

Binomial name
- Norraca longipennis Moore, 1881

Synonyms
- Oraura longipennis; Saliocleta (Norraca) longipennis; Armiana longipennis; Ceira longipennis; Norraca uncinata Semper, 1902; Norraca ordgara Schaus, 1928

= Norraca longipennis =

Species of moth

Norraca longipennis is a moth of the family Notodontidae described by Frederic Moore in 1881. It is sometimes classified as Oaura longipennis. It is found in India, Sri Lanka, Andaman Islands, Indochina, Sundaland, Java, Bali, and Philippines.

Head, thorax and forewings of the male are ochreous. Forewings with four or five fuscous lines beyond the middle. Abdomen and hindwings with a reddish tinge. Larva typical of Sphingidae with a horn on the anal somite.
