= Keira =

Keira may refer to:

- Keira (given name)
- The electoral district of Keira, in New South Wales, Australia
- A fictional character, in the Jak and Daxter video game series
- Mount Keira, Wollongong, New South Wales, Australia
- The Keira dynasty, rulers of Darfur (Sudan, 17th-20th centuries)
- Keira (wrestler) (born 1995), ring name of Mexican masked professional wrestler
- Murder of Keira Gross, 2018 murder of 14-year-old German girl in Berlin
