= Kira Povarova =

Russian material scientist and professor

Kira Borisovna Povarova (born September 3, 1933) is a Russian material scientist, professor, doctor of technical sciences, recipient of a number of state and academic awards.

== Monographs ==
- K. B. Povarova, Evgenij Michajlovič Savickij, "Splavy tugoplavkich i redkich metallov dlja raboty pri vysokich temperaturach", Nauka, 1984
- Evgenij Michajlovič Savickij, K. B. Povarova, M. A. Tylkina, "Rhenium Alloys", CCM Information Corporation, 1965
- K. B. Povarova, "PROPERTIES AND USES OF RHENIUM", 1965
- Сплавы рения. М.: Наука, 1965, 323 с. Соавторы: Савицкий Е.М., Тылкина М.А.
- Металловедение вольфрама. М.: Металлургия, 1978, 223 с. Соавторы: Савицкий Е.М., Макаров П.В.
- Тугоплавкие металлы и сплавы. М.: Металлургия, 1986, 352 с. Соавторы: Савицкий Е.М., Бурханов Г.С. и др.

== Awards ==
- 1968: USSR State Prize
- 1996: H.N. Anosov Prize of the Russian Academy of Sciences
- 2001: Russian Federation Government Prize in Science and Technology(ru:Премия Правительства Российской Федерации в области науки и техники)
