= Kirara Beach, Shimane =

Beach in Japan

Kirara Beach (雲母浜, Kirarahama) is a recreational beach on the Sea of Japan in Izumo, Shimane Prefecture, Japan. It is located in the area of former town of Taki, which was merged into Izumo in 2005.

The name Kirara (雲母, "mica") or "isinglass," is similar to the Japanese sound effect "kirakira" used for something glittery. Kirara Beach glitters in the sunlight, fitting the appearance of mica.

Kirara Beach is the first beach to open in the San'in region in early June; kids' events are planned for the opening of the beach. The beach has clean water and offshore stacks of cement tetrapods to break the waves. Nearby is health spa and onsen, and an eatery with an all-you-can-eat "baikingu" buffet, whose dining area commands a view of the beach and the Sea of Japan.
