= Chiara =

Chiara is a word and place name of Italian origin, meaning "bright" or "clear", and may refer to:

== People ==
- Chiara (name)
- Chiara da Montefalco, (1268–1308), an Augustinian nun and abbess
- Chiara (Italian singer) or Chiara Galiazzo (born 1986)
- Chiara or Chiara Iezzi (born 1973), Italian actress, singer, and musician known as Chiara. Also part of the duo Paola & Chiara
- Chiara (Maltese singer) or Chiara Siracusa (born 1976)

== Places ==
- Chiara District, Andahuaylas, Peru
- Chiara District, Huamanga, Peru

== Other uses ==
- 4398 Chiara, a minor planet
- Chiara River, a tributary of the Dârjov in Romania
- Chiara (film), 2022 film
- A song by Andrea Bocelli from the 2001 album Cieli di Toscana
- A song by the jazz group Trio 3 from the 2014 album Wiring

== See also ==
- Chiara e Serafina, an opera semiseria by Gaetano Donizetti
- Chiaramonte
- Ciara (disambiguation)
- Keira (disambiguation)
- Paola e Chiara, an Italian pop music duo
- Saint Clare (disambiguation)
- Santa Chiara (disambiguation)
