= Kyara =

Kyara may refer to:

- Paul Henry Kyara, Tanzanian politician
- Kyara Stijns (born 1995), Dutch racing cyclist
- Kyara, a character in the video game Ururun Quest: Koiyuuki
- Kyara, a character in the Colombian TV series El capo
- Kyara, a village in Sirohi district, Rajasthan, India - see Battle of Kasahrada
- Kyara Tehsil, a Tehsil (administrative division) in Bareilly district, Uttar Pradesh, India
- Kyara (伽羅), in Japan the highest grade of agarwood
- "Kyara", a short story by Jirō Asada
- "Kyara", a character in the manga Usogui

== See also ==
- Kiara (disambiguation)
