= Saint Cera =

7th-century Irish abbess

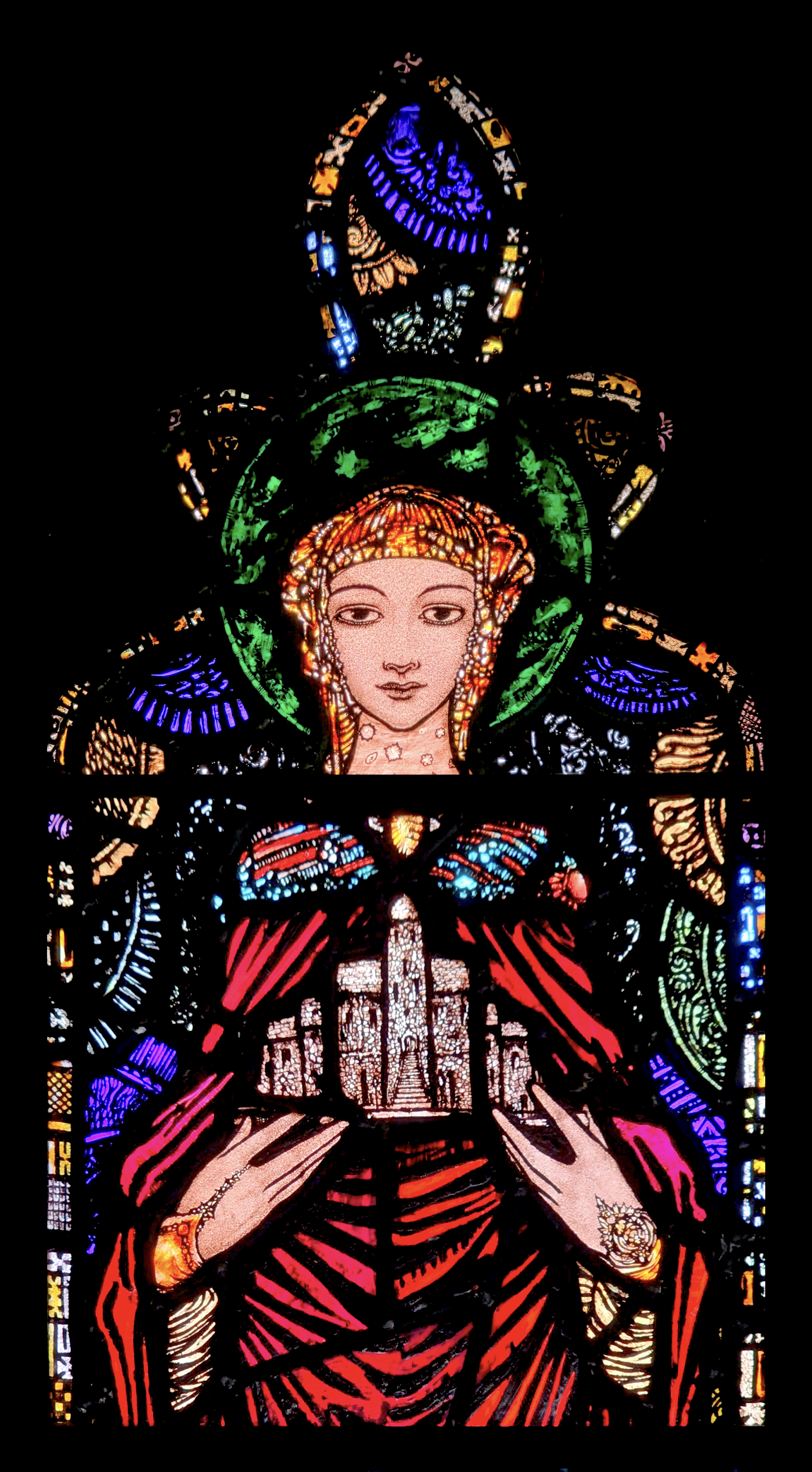
- St. Ceara by Harry Clarke at St. Joseph's Carrickmacross, Ireland
- Died: 679
- Feast: 15 March, additionally 5 January in the Orthodox Church

Saint Cera of Ireland (alternately Chera, Chier, Cier, Ciara, Ciera, Cyra, Céire, Keira, Keara, Kiara, Kiera, Ceara, Ciar) was an abbess in the 7th century who died in 679. Her history is commingled with another Cera (alternately Cier, Ciar, Ciara) who lived in the 6th century. However, some authors maintain that monastic mistakes account for references to Cera in the 6th century or that a single Cera had an exceptionally long life span.

== Life ==
There are two stories connected with the saint(s). In the first story, Cera's prayers saved an Irish town from a foul-smelling fire. When a noxious blaze broke out in "Muscraig, in Momonia," St. Brendan instructed the inhabitants to seek Cera's prayers. They followed his instructions, Cera prayed in response to their supplications, and the fire disappeared. Since St. Brendan died in 577, this story likely refers to an earlier Cera. "Muscraig, in Momonia" may refer to Muskerry, an area outside of Cork. "Momonia" refers to southern Ireland in at least one ancient map.

The other story relates how St. Cera established a nunnery called Teych-Telle around the year 625. Cera was the daughter of Duibhre (or Dubreus) reportedly in the bloodline of the kings of Connor (or Conaire). She, along with 5 other virgins asked Saint Fintan Munnu for a place to serve God. He and his monks gave the women their abbey in Heli (or Hele). Heli may have been in County Westmeath. He blessed Cera, and instructed her to name the place after St. Telle who had given birth to four children, Matthew, Mark, Luke, and John in the plain of Miodhluachra that day.

St. Cera eventually returned to her own province and founded another monastery, Killchree, which she governed until her death in 679. The later Franciscan Kilcrea Friary stands about a mile west of where her monastery stood, and claims to have taken its name, Kilcrea, in her honor: "Kilcrea (Cill Chre) means the Cell of Cere, Ciara, Cera or Cyra."

== Remembrance ==
St. Cera's feast day is 15 March, the day of her death; she is also commemorated on 16 October. And on 5 January in the Orthodox Church.
