= Ciarán =

Male given name of Irish origin

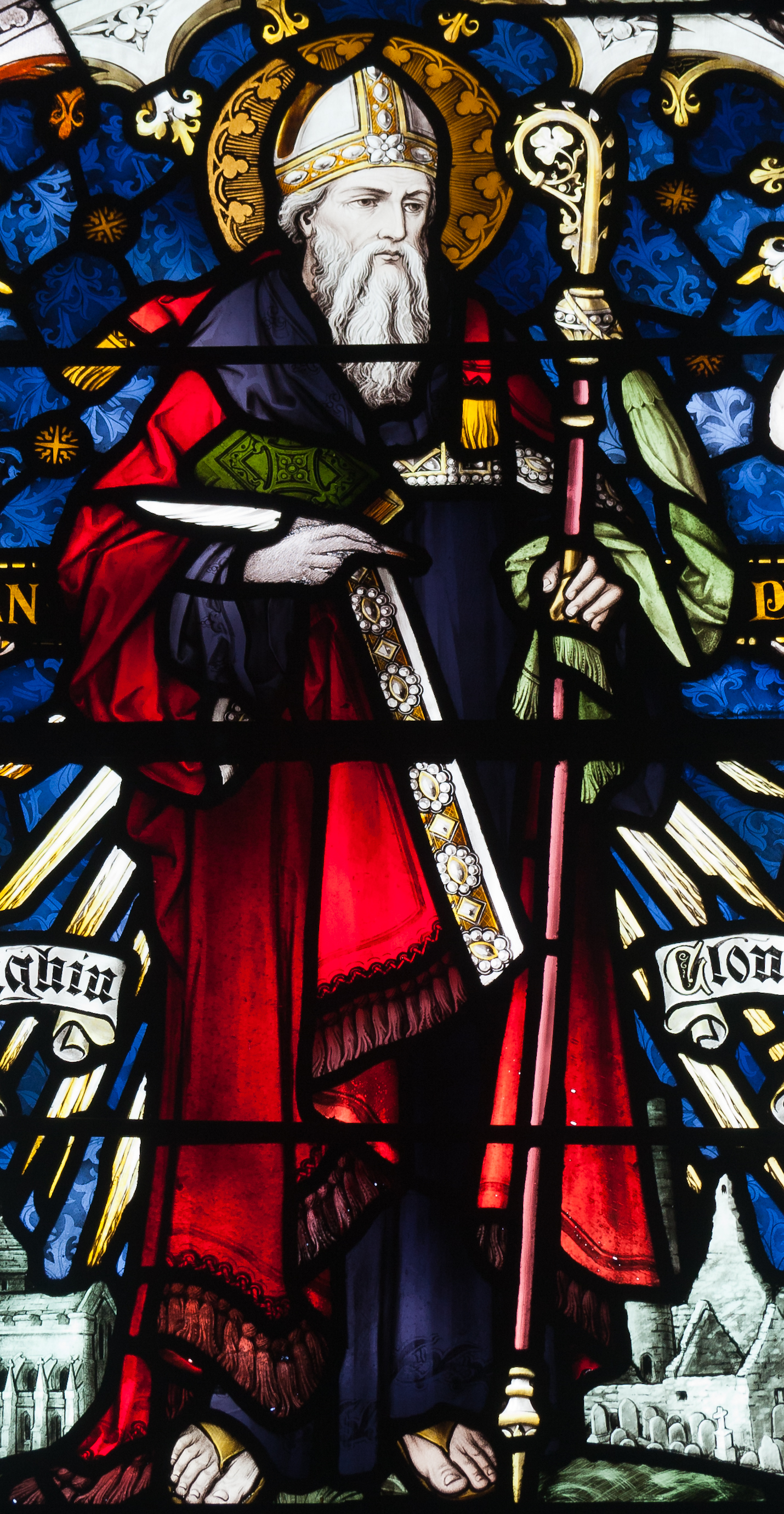
- Ciarán of Clonmacnoise
- Pronunciation: English: /ˈkɪərən, -rɔːn/ KEER-ən, -awn Irish: [ˈciəɾˠaːn̪ˠ, ciəˈɾˠaːn̪ˠ] Scottish Gaelic: [ˈkʲʰiəɾan]
- Gender: Masculine
- Language: Irish, Scottish Gaelic, English

Origin
- Origin: Gaels
- Meaning: "little dark one"
- Region of origin: Ireland and Scotland

Other names
- Alternative spelling: Ciaran
- Variant forms: Ciarian; Ciaron; Cieran; Crain; Kieran; Kierin; Keiran; Keiron; Kieron; Kieryn; Kiran; Keiren; Kieren; Kyran; Kyron; Keeran; Kairan; Ceiren
- Related names: Ciara

Ciarán (Irish spelling) or Ciaran (Scottish Gaelic spelling) is a traditionally male given name of Irish and Scottish origin. It means "little dark one" or "little dark-haired one", produced by appending a diminutive suffix to ciar ("black", "dark"). It is the masculine version of the name Ciara.

The name became common in reference to Ciar, son of Fergus mac Róich, who gave his name to the Ciarraige and County Kerry, and two early Irish saints both counted among the Twelve Apostles of Ireland: Ciarán the Elder and Ciarán the Younger.

It is anglicised in various ways: Ciaran, Kieran, Keiran, Keiron, Keiren, Keerun, Kiran, etc.

According to historian C. Thomas Cairney, the O'Kierans were the chiefly family of the Cíarraige tribe who in turn were from the Dumnonii or Laigin who were the third wave of Celts to settle in Ireland during the first century BC.

The name can also be found in the Irish surname of O'Keiran, meaning "descendant of Ciarán".

== Notable people ==
- Ciarán Bairéad (1905–1976), Irish folklorist and scholar
- Ciarán Barry, Irish hurler
- Ciarán Bourke (1935–1988), Irish musician
- Ciarán Brennan (born 1956), Irish musician
- Ciarán Byrne (born 1994), Irish Australian rules footballer
- Ciarán Cannon (born 1965), Irish politician
- Ciarán Carey (born 1970), Irish hurling player
- Ciaran Carson (1948–2019), Northern Irish poet and playwright
- Ciaran Clark (born 1989), Irish footballer
- Ciarán Clarke, Irish hurler
- Ciaran Clear John Patrick (1920–2000), Irish painter
- Ciarán Collins, Irish writer
- Ciarán Cuffe (born 1963), Irish politician
- Ciarán Donnelly (director), Irish film and television director
- Ciaran Donnelly (footballer) (born 1984), English footballer
- Ciarán Farrell (born 1969), Irish composer
- Ciaran Fitzgerald (born 1952), Irish rugby player and coach
- Ciarán Frawley (born 1997), Irish rugby union centre
- Ciarán Griffiths (born 1983), English actor
- Ciaran Gultnieks (born 1970), English computer/video game programmer
- Ciarán Hinds (born 1953), Irish actor
- Ciarán Hope, Fulbright Scholar and Irish composer of orchestral, choral, and film music
- Ciaran Jenkins (born 1984), Welsh journalist
- Ciaran Jeremiah, British keyboardist
- Ciarán Joyce (born 2002), Irish hurler
- Ciarán Kilkenny (born 1993), Irish Gaelic footballer
- Ciarán Kelly (footballer, born 1980)
- Ciaran Kelly (footballer, born 1998)
- Ciarán Kenny (born 1984), Irish hurler
- Ciarán Kilduff (born 1988), Irish football manager and former footballer
- Ciarán Lenehan (born 1990), Irish Gaelic footballer
- Ciarán Lynch (born 1964), Irish politician
- Ciarán Lyng (born 1985), Irish Gaelic footballer
- Ciarán MacGillivray (born 1987), member of Cape Breton musical group "The Cottars"
- Ciarán Mac Mathúna (1925–2009), Irish broadcaster and music expert
- Ciaran Madden (born 1942), English actress
- Ciarán Martyn (born 1980), Irish footballer
- Ciarán McDonald (born 1975), Irish Gaelic coach and former footballer
- Ciarán McDonald (Tipperary Gaelic footballer), Irish Gaelic footballer
- Ciarán McGann, Irish hurler
- Ciarán McKeever (born 1983), Irish Gaelic footballer
- Ciarán McKeown (1943–2019), Northern Irish peace activist
- Ciarán McMenamin (born 1975), Northern Irish actor
- Ciarán Mullan (born 1984), Irish Gaelic footballer
- Ciarán Murphy (born 1940), Irish politician
- Ciaran O'Brien (born 1987), American soccer player
- Ciarán O Gealbháin, Irish singer
- Ciarán O'Keeffe (born 1971), English parapsychologist
- Ciaran O'Leary (born 1973), Irish professional poker player
- Ciarán Ó Lionáird (1988–2026), Irish runner
- Ciarán O'Sullivan (born 1970), Irish Gaelic football player
- Ciarán Power (born 1976), Irish cyclist
- Ciarán Sheehan (dual player) (born 1990), Irish Australian rules footballer
- Ciarán Sheehan (actor), Irish actor
- Ciarán Teehan, Irish darts player
- Ciarán Thompson (born 1994 or 1995), Irish Gaelic footballer
- Ciarán Tobin, Irish businessman
- Ciarán Toner (born 1981), Northern Irish football coach and former footballer
- Ciarán Walsh, Irish artist
- Ciarán Whelan (born 1976), Irish Gaelic footballer

=== Saints ===
- Saint Ciarán Saighir or Ciarán the Elder
- Saint Ciarán of Clonmacnoise or Ciarán the Younger
- Saint Ciarán of Dissert-Kieran, celebrated 14 June
- Saint Ciarán of Clonsost, commemorated 30 April
- Saint Ciarán mac Colga, celebrated 19 May
- Saint Ciarán Mac Eochaidh of Tubrid, a protogé of Saint Declan

=== People with the given name Ciaron ===
- Ciaron Brown (born 1998), English footballer
- Ciaron Harkin (born 1996), Irish footballer
- Ciaron Maher (born 1981), Australian horse trainer
- Ciaron O'Reilly (born 1960), Australian activist
- Ciaron Pilbeam, British Formula One engineer

=== People with the given name Keiren ===
- Keiren Westwood (born 1984), English-Irish footballer

=== People with the given name Kieran ===
- Kieran Brennan (born 1957), Irish hurler
- Kieran Charnock (born 1984), English footballer
- Kieran Conry (born 1951), Bishop of Arundel and Brighton
- Kieran Corr (born 2005), American football player
- Kieran Culkin (born 1982), American actor
- Kieran Doherty (1955–1981), Provisional Irish Republican Army hunger striker
- Kieran Doherty, Northern Irish writer, TV format creator and Executive Producer
- Kieran Donaghy (born 1983), Irish Gaelic footballer
- Kieran Donnelly, Irish Gaelic footballer
- Kieran Dover (born 1996), Australian soccer player
- Kieran Egan (1942–2022), Irish-Anglo-Canadian educationist
- Kieran Foran (born 1990), New Zealand rugby league player
- Kieran Gibbs (born 1989), English footballer
- Kieran Phelan (1949–2010), Irish Politician
- Kieran Goss (born 1962), Irish musician
- Kieran Hanrahan (born 1957), Irish musician and broadcaster
- Kieran Hebden (born 1977), English musician
- Kieran Kane (born 1949), American country singer
- Kieran Lalor (born 1976), American politician
- Kieran Lyons (born 1989), Fiji's top female chess player
- Kieran Mahon, British musician
- Kieran McAnespie (born 1979), Scottish footballer
- Kieran McFeely, Irish musician
- Kieran McGeeney (born 1971), Irish Gaelic footballer and coach
- Kieran McKeever (born 1968), Irish dual player
- Kieran Mulroney (born 1965), American actor and screenwriter
- Kieran Noema-Barnett (born 1987), New Zealand cricketer
- Kieran Nugent (1958–2000), Provisional Irish Republican Army (PIRA) member
- Kieran O'Brien (born 1973), English actor
- Kieran O'Connor (1979–2020), Irish Gaelic footballer
- Kieran O'Donnell (born 1963), Irish politician
- Kieran Phelan (1949–2010), Irish politician
- Sir Kieran Prendergast (born 1942), English diplomat and former United Nations officer
- Kieran Prendiville (born 1947), English television writer, producer, and presenter
- Kieran Read (born 1985), New Zealand rugby union player
- Kieran Richardson (born 1984), English footballer
- Kieran Scott (born 1974), female American author
- Kieran Smith (born 2000), American swimmer and Olympic bronze medalist
- Kieran Suckling (born 1964), Conservationist
- Kieran Tierney (born 1997), Scottish footballer
- Kieran Trippier (born 1990), English footballer
- Kieran West (born 1977), Olympic gold medal-winning rower
- Kieran White (died 1995), English singer

=== People with the given name Kieren ===
- Kieren Fallon (born 1965), six-time British Champion Jockey
- Kieren Jack (born 1987), Australian rules footballer
- Kieren Perkins (born 1973), Australian swimmer and Olympic gold medallist
- Kieren Webster (born 1986), Scottish musician

=== People with the given name Kieron ===
- Kieron Dawson (born 1975), Irish rugby union player
- Kieron Dwyer (born 1967), American comic book artist
- Kieron Dyer (born 1978), English footballer
- Kieron Gillen (born 1975), English computer games and music journalist, as well as a comic book author
- Kieron Moore (1924–2007), Irish actor
- Kieron Pollard (born 1987), West Indies cricketer
- Kieron Richardson (born 1986), English actor

=== People with the given name Kyran ===
- Kyran Bracken (born 1971), Irish rugby union player
- Kyran Durnin, missing child whose disappearance is now classed as murder
- Kyran O'Donnell (born 1958), Australian politician

=== People with the given name Kyren ===
- Kyren Williams (born 2000), American professional football running back

== Fictional characters ==
- Ciaran McCarthy, a character from the British soap opera, Coronation Street
- King Ciaran of Venallis, one of the main characters in the Song of Souls trilogy by Christen Stovall
- Lord's Blade Ciaran, from the video game Dark Souls
- Kieran, from The Dark Artifices by Cassandra Clare, a Wild Hunter and Mark Blackthorn's boyfriend
- Kieran is the son of Lord Donnán, who appears in the seventh episode of psychological horror adventure game, The Last Door
- Lena Kieran Luthor, a character from the CW series Supergirl, played by Katie McGrath
- Kieran Northrup, the main character of the novel Don't Call Me Ishmael
- Kieran, a playable character in “Fire Emblem-Path of Radiance” and “Fire Emblem-Radiant Dawn”
- Ciaran, a mysterious character in "1899" by Netflix
- Kieran Duffy, fictional character from Red Dead Redemption 2
- Ciaran, Sarah McCool's love interest in the Channel 4 sitcom, Derry Girls
- Kieran, a supporting character from Pokémon Scarlet and Violet's DLC The Hidden Treasure of Area Zero

== Other cultures ==
- Cioran is a Romanian surname. A notable individual with the name was nihilist philosopher Emil Cioran.

== See also ==
- List of Irish-language given names
- Ciarán (storm), a 2023 storm in northwestern Europe
- Cian Ciaran (born 1976), Welsh keyboard player
- Ciara (given name)
- Errigal Ciarán, Irish Gaelic Athletic Association club
- Chiron (disambiguation)
- Kyron (given name)
- Kira (given name)
- Keeran (disambiguation)
- Kiran (disambiguation), an Indian name
- Kirin (disambiguation), Asian name
- Irish clans
