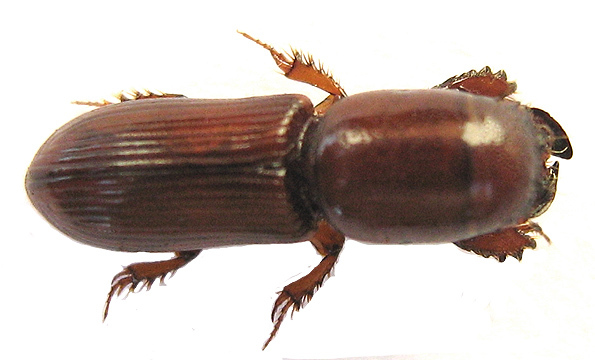
- Chiron volvulus Klug, Botswana

Scientific classification
- Kingdom: Animalia
- Phylum: Arthropoda
- Clade: Pancrustacea
- Class: Insecta
- Order: Coleoptera
- Suborder: Polyphaga
- Infraorder: Scarabaeiformia
- Family: Scarabaeidae
- Subfamily: Chironinae; Blanchard, 1845

= Chironinae =

Family of beetles

Chironidae is a family of beetles belonging to the superfamily Scarabaeoidea. Chironidae are primitive looking scarab beetles that occur in Africa, Asia (predominantly India) and Madagascar.

== Genera and species ==
The following genera and species are included in Chironidae:

Genus Amphiceratodon Huchet, 2000
Amphiceratodon argonautes Huchet, 2002 - Africa
Amphiceratodon arrowi Huchet, 2002 - Africa
Amphiceratodon capensis (Hope, 1845) - Africa
Amphiceratodon karooensis Huchet, 2002
Genus Chiron MacLeay, 1819
Chiron aberlenci Huchet, 2019 - Africa
Chiron assamensis Hope, 1845 - India
Chiron bartolozzii Huchet, 2019 - Somalia
Chiron cylindrus (Fabricius, 1798) - Palaearctic, Indomalaya
Chiron demirei Huchet, 2019 - Africa
Chiron elegans Huchet, 2020 - Africa
Chiron hovanus Fairmaire, 1901 - Madagascar
Chiron kelleri Fairmaire, 1893 - Somalia
Chiron lucifer Huchet, 2019 - Africa
Chiron mariannae Huchet, 2019 - Africa
Chiron massaicus Huchet, 2019 - Africa
Chiron oddurensis Huchet, 2019 - Somalia
Chiron senegalensis Hope, 1845 - Senegal
Chiron stuempkei Huchet, 2019 - Kenya, Ethiopia, Somalia, Uganda
Chiron vignei Huchet, 2025 - Tanzania
Chiron volvulus Klug, 1855 - Mozambique
Genus Theotimius Huchet, 2000
Subgenus Amaecylius Huchet, 2000 - Africa, Madagascar

Theotimius angolensis Huchet, 2004 - Angola
Theotimius gravis (Péringuey, 1901) - Lesotho
Theotimius laevicollis (Arrow, 1936) - Kenya
Theotimius macleayi Huchet, 2003 - Madagascar
Theotimius mahafalensis (Paulian, 1976) - Madagascar
Theotimius patrizii (Boucomont, 1923) - Somalia, Kenya, Tanzania
Theotimius pauliani Huchet, 2003 - Madagascar
Theotimius rhodesianus (Arrow, 1936) - Zambia, Mozambique

Subgenus Theotimius Huchet, 2000

Theotimius grandis (Gory, 1838) - Sahelian Africa
