= Fiji Chess Federation =

Governing body of chess in Fiji

The Fiji Chess Federation coordinates chess tournaments in Fiji and is affiliated to FIDE (World Chess Federation).

== History ==
Chess has been played in Fiji for a long time, but it was the 1972 World Championship, between Bobby Fischer and Boris Spasky, that provided the impetus for chess competitions in the country with the formation of the Suva Chess Club. Other chess clubs soon sprang up, like the Fiji School of Medicine Chess Club and the University of the South Pacific Chess Club. In 1979 it was decided to form the Fiji Chess Federation, to enable participation in international tournaments and to get international support and recognition. The founding members included Som Prakash and Nazim Khan.

The Fiji Chess Federation obtained sponsorship for regular tournaments and players were given chess rating. In 1986 the Federation sent its first team to the 27th Chess Olympiad in Dubai with help from the organising committee of the olympiad, and one of its members, Jasvinder Singh, obtaining international rating.

The military coup of 1987 put restrictions on chess games on Sundays and by the end of the year the president and treasurer had resigned due to work commitments. The leadership of the Federation passed onto Surjeet Singh who reorganised it with the establishment of a number of new chess clubs. These included the Lautoka Chess Club and Nausori Chess Club.

The Federation organised fund raising activities to send a team to the 28th Chess Olympiad in 1988 in Thessaloniki, Greece. It was captained by Surjeet Singh.

Singh resigned as president in 1989. Virgilio De Asa was elected President from 1990 - 1994, and was succeeded by professor David Jenkins of the University of the South Pacific.De Asa was re-elected in 1996 and continued until his retirement in 2014.

== Recent events ==
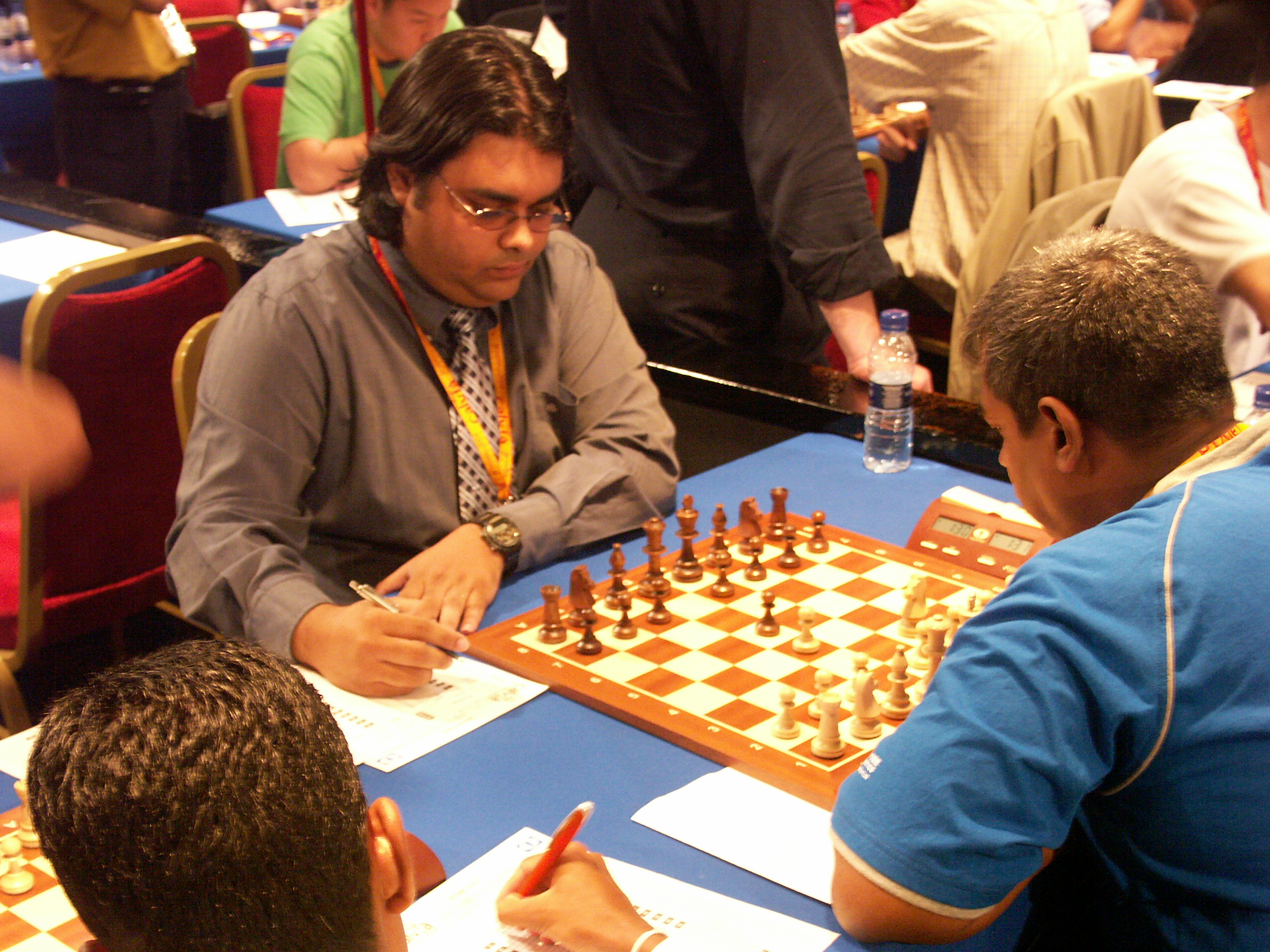
Asheesh Gautam at Mallorca Chess Olympiad, 2004

In 2006, the Fiji Chess Team took part in its 7th Olympiad, the 37th Chess Olympiad in Turin, Italy. Calvin Prasad, a former national champion, obtained international rating and earned a Candidate Masters title. Fiji Chess Federation General Secretary Dr. Jashint Maharaj was awarded his FIDE Arbiter's title in 2009 Kieran Lyons, who played on board one for the Fiji Women's team at the 36th Chess Olympiad in Spain, was awarded the Women's FIDE Master title in January 2005.

2006 - 2014 have seen a series of high-profile awards being issued to players of the Fiji Chess Federation.

Fiji Chess was also part of 2016 42nd Chess Olympiad in Baku. Open team members Calvin Prasad, Manoj Kumar, Taione Sikivou, Noel Adricula and Goru Arvind. Women's Team members Gloria Sukhu, Hilda Vukikomoala, Cydel Terubea, Tanvi Radha Prasad and Sugandha Goswami.

FCF faced some problems post 42nd Chess Olympiad which saw a change in executives and a new first female President. (https://islandsbusiness.com/news-break/court-unveils-fiji-chess-scandal/). Because of this not many local events were organised and Fiji did not participate in 43rd Chess Olympiad.

Team Fiji was one of the 153 teams from all over the globe which participated in the FIDE Online Olympiad 2021 tournament. Fiji’s Online Chess Team got their second all-time World Chess Olympiad hat-trick, registering wins against Seychelles 6 – 0, Laos 6 – 0 and Brunei Darussalam 4.5 – 1.5. Fiji also drew with Nepal 3 – 3 ending their particip[ation in the Olympiad.

== Past Presidents ==
- CM Calvin Prasad (2014 - 2018)
- Dr. Virgilio De Asa (1996 - 2014)
- Dr. David Jenkins (1995)
- Dr. Virgilio De Asa (1990 - 1994)
- Mr. Surjeet Singh (1987 - 1989)
- Dr. Champak Rathod (1979 - 1987)
