= Altamar =

Altamar may refer to:

- Altamar, the marketing name for the SA1 Swansea Waterfront development area in Swansea Dock, Wales
- MV Altamar, an Argentinian merchant ship which previously served in the United States Navy as USS Chiron

== See also ==
- High Seas (TV series) (Spanish: Alta Mar), a Spanish mystery series
