= Chiron (disambiguation) =

Chiron is a centaur from Greek mythology.

Chiron may also refer to:

== Space and astronomy ==
- 2060 Chiron, a centaur (small Solar System body) in the outer Solar System
- Chiron (hypothetical moon), a supposed moon of Saturn later found not to exist
- Chiron, a fictional planet in the computer game Sid Meier's Alpha Centauri
- Chiron, a fictional planet in the James P. Hogan novel Voyage from Yesteryear

== Cars and racing ==
- Louis Chiron (1899–1979), Monegasque racing driver
- Bugatti Chiron, the 2016 successor to the Bugatti Veyron
- Bugatti 18/3 Chiron, a 1999 concept car
- Chiron World Sports Cars, a British manufacturer of sports racing cars

== Other uses ==
- Chiron (missile), the South Korean KP-SAM Shin-Gung surface-to-air missile
- Chiron Corporation, a biotechnology firm, now part of Novartis
- Chiron (journal), a German academic journal for ancient history
- Chiron (Percy Jackson), mentor and activities director in the series Percy Jackson & the Olympians
- Chiron (Moonlight), lead character in 2016 film Moonlight played by Alex Hibbert ("Little"), Ashton Sanders (teen Chiron) and Trevante Rhodes ("Black")
- "Chiron" (song), by All That Remains
- Chiron, a programming language created by Robert W. Floyd
- Chiron, a son of Tamora, Queen of Goths, in Shakespeare's tragedy Titus Andronicus
- Roman Catholic Diocese of Chiron, suppressed Greek Roman Catholic diocese
- USS Chiron, a United States Navy motor torpedo boat tender in commission from 1945 to 1946
- Chiron (beetle), a genus of scarab beetles

== See also ==
- Cheiron Studios, a music studio in Sweden
- Chiro (disambiguation)
- Chyron (disambiguation)
- Khyron, a villain in the TV series Robotech
- Kiron (disambiguation)
- Kyron (disambiguation)
