= Kyron =

Kyron may refer to:

- Kyron (given name)
- SsangYong Kyron, a sport utility vehicle

== See also ==
- Cheiron Studios, a music studio in Sweden
- Chiron (disambiguation)
- Chyron (disambiguation)
- Khyron, a villain in the TV series Robotech
- Kiron (disambiguation)
