= Wiktionary =

Multilingual online dictionary

- Logo of English Wiktionary

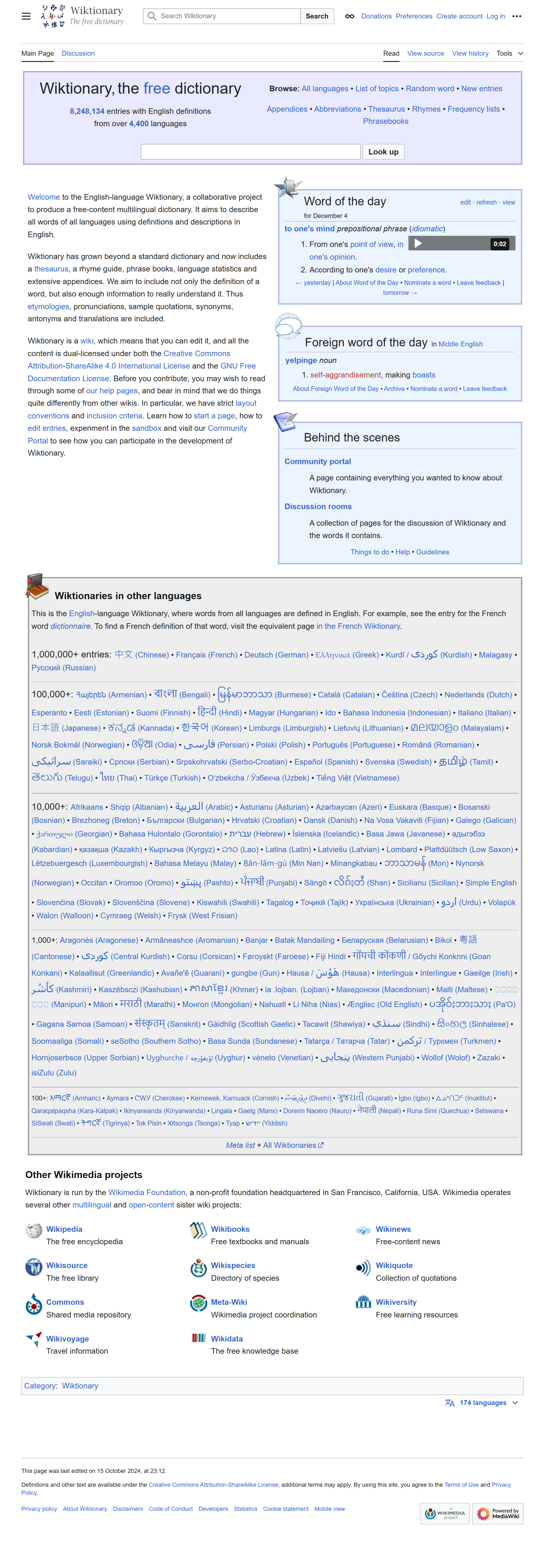
- Screenshot Main Page of the English Wiktionary on December 4, 2024
- Website type: Online dictionary
- Available in: Multilingual (173 active)
- Owner: Wikimedia Foundation
- Creators: Jimmy Wales; Wikimedia community
- Website: wiktionary.org
- Commercial: No
- Registration: Optional
- Launched: December 12, 2002; 23 years ago
- Current status: Active

Wiktionary (US: /ˈwɪkʃənɛri/ WIK-shə-nerr-ee, UK: /ˈwɪkʃənəri/ WIK-shə-nər-ee; rhyming with "dictionary") is a multilingual, web-based project to create a free content dictionary of terms (including words, phrases, proverbs, linguistic reconstructions, etc.) in a large number of natural languages and a number of artificial languages. These entries may contain definitions, images for illustration, pronunciations, etymologies, inflections, usage examples, quotations, related terms, and translations of terms into other languages, among other features. It is collaboratively edited by volunteers via a wiki. Its name is a portmanteau of the words wiki and dictionary. It is available in 198 languages and in Simple English. Like its sister project Wikipedia, Wiktionary is run by the Wikimedia Foundation, and is written collaboratively by volunteers, dubbed "Wiktionarians". Its wiki software, MediaWiki, allows almost anyone with access to the website to create and edit entries.

Because Wiktionary is not limited by print space considerations, most of Wiktionary's language editions provide definitions and translations of terms from many languages, and some editions offer additional information typically found in thesauri.

Wiktionary's data is frequently used in various natural language processing tasks.

== History and development ==
Wiktionary was brought online on December 12, 2002, following a proposal by Daniel Alston and an idea by Larry Sanger, co-founder of Wikipedia. On March 28, 2004, the first non-English Wiktionaries were initiated in French and Polish. Wiktionaries in numerous other languages have since been started. Wiktionary was hosted on a temporary domain name (wiktionary.wikipedia.org) until May 1, 2004, when it switched to the current domain name. (Note: Wiktionary's current URL is www.wiktionary.org) As of July 2021, Wiktionary features over 30 million articles (and even more entries) across its editions. The largest of the language editions is the English Wiktionary, with over 7.5 million entries, followed by the French Wiktionary with over 4.7 million and the Malagasy Wiktionary with over 3.5 million entries. Forty-three Wiktionary language editions contain over 100,000 entries each. (Note: Wiktionary total article counts are here. Detailed statistics by word type are available here .)

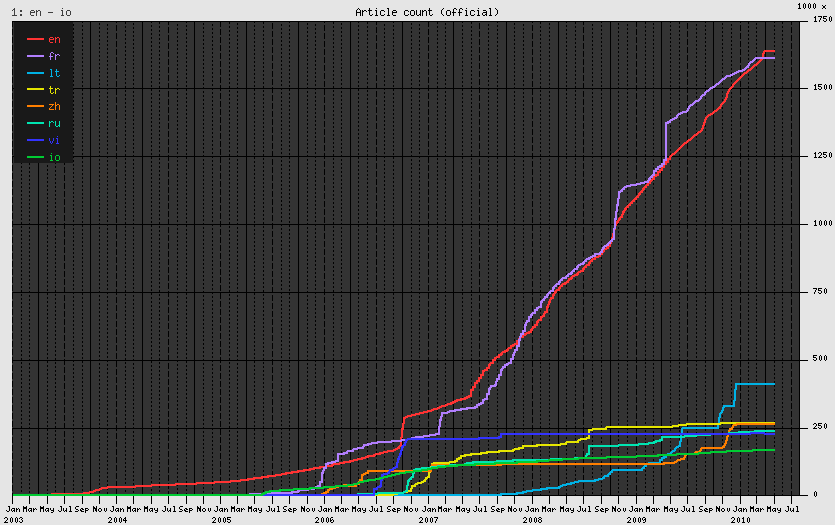
The use of bots to generate large numbers of articles is visible as "growth spurts" in this graph of article counts at the largest eight Wiktionary editions. (Data as of December 2009)

Many of the definitions in the project's largest language editions were created by bots that found creative ways to generate entries or (rarely) automatically imported thousands of entries from previously published dictionaries. Seven of the 18 bots registered at the English Wiktionary in 2007 (Note: The user list at the English Wiktionary identifies accounts that have been given "bot status".) created 163,000 of the entries there.

Another bot, "ThirdPersBot", was responsible for the addition of a number of third-person conjugations that would not have received their own entries in standard dictionaries; for instance, it defined "smoulders" as the "third-person singular simple present form of smoulder." Of the 1,269,938 definitions the English Wiktionary provides for 996,450 English words, 478,068 are "form of" definitions of this kind. This means that even without such entries, its coverage of English is significantly larger than that of major monolingual print dictionaries. Merriam-Webster's Third New International Dictionary, for instance, has 475,000 entries (with many additional embedded headwords); the Oxford English Dictionary has 615,000 headwords, but includes Middle English as well, for which the English Wiktionary has an additional 34,234 gloss definitions. Detailed statistics exist to show how many entries of various kinds exist.

The English Wiktionary does not rely on bots to the extent that some other editions do. The French and Vietnamese Wiktionaries, for example, imported large sections of the Free Vietnamese Dictionary Project (FVDP), which provides free content bilingual dictionaries to and from Vietnamese. (Note: Hồ Ngọc Đức, Free Vietnamese Dictionary Project. Details at the Vietnamese Wiktionary.) These imported entries make up virtually all of the Vietnamese edition's contents. Like the English edition, the French Wiktionary has imported approximately 20,000 entries from the Unihan database of CJK characters. The French Wiktionary grew rapidly in 2006 thanks in a large part to bots copying many entries from old, freely licensed dictionaries, such as the eighth edition of the Dictionnaire de l'Académie française (1935, around 35,000 words), and using bots to add words from other Wiktionary editions with French translations. The Russian edition grew by nearly 80,000 entries as "LXbot" added boilerplate entries (with headings, but without definitions) for words in English and German.

As of July 2021, the English Wiktionary has over 791,870 gloss definitions and over 1,269,938 total definitions (including different forms) for English entries alone, with a total of over 9,928,056 definitions across all languages.

=== Logos ===
Wiktionary has historically lacked a uniform logo across its numerous language editions. Some editions use logos that depict a dictionary entry about the term "Wiktionary", based on the previous English Wiktionary logo, which was designed by Brooke Vibber, a MediaWiki developer. Because a purely textual logo must vary considerably from language to language, a four-phase contest to adopt a uniform logo was held at the Wikimedia Meta-Wiki from September to October 2006. (Note: "Wiktionary/logo", Meta-Wiki, Wikimedia Foundation.) Some communities adopted the winning entry by the user known as "Smurrayinchester", a 3×3 grid of wooden tiles, each bearing a character from a different writing system. However, the poll did not see as much participation from the Wiktionary community as some community members had hoped, and a number of the larger wikis ultimately kept their textual logos.

In April 2009, the issue was resurrected with a new contest. This time, a depiction by "AAEngelman" of an open hardbound dictionary won a head-to-head vote against the 2006 logo, but the process to refine and adopt the new logo then stalled. In the following years, some wikis replaced their textual logos with one of the two newer logos. In 2012, 55 wikis that had been using the English Wiktionary logo received localized versions of the 2006 design by "Smurrayinchester". (Note: [Translators-l] 56 Wiktionaries got a localised logo) In July 2016, the English Wiktionary adopted a variant of this logo. As of 4 July 2016, 135 wikis, representing 61% of Wiktionary's entries, use a logo based on the 2006 design by "Smurrayinchester", 33 wikis (36%) use a textual logo, and three wikis (3%) use the 2009 design by "AAEngelman".

== Multi-lingual ==
As of October 2026, there are Wiktionary sites for 198 languages of which 173 are active and 25 are closed. The active sites have 50,564,551 articles, and the closed sites have 339 articles. There are 8,011,108 registered users of which 9,369 are recently active.

Top ten Wiktionary language projects by mainspace article count
No.	Language	Wiki	Good	Total	Edits	Admins	Users	Active users	Files
1	English	en	9,222,777	11,365,910	93,747,595	76	4,508,089	4,719	19
2	French	fr	7,031,266	7,921,892	39,919,829	32	416,228	898	6
3	Malagasy	mg	6,138,854	6,266,442	37,852,374	2	17,101	22	3
4	Chinese	zh	2,402,531	3,258,338	9,939,557	9	135,109	98	1
5	Thai	th	2,207,331	2,346,649	5,775,646	4	19,651	47	0
6	Greek	el	1,712,822	1,776,100	7,675,229	11	72,911	133	23
7	Turkish	tr	1,543,778	1,665,711	5,989,939	6	68,639	54	1
8	Russian	ru	1,535,683	3,115,151	14,452,569	14	347,403	302	196
9	German	de	1,271,040	1,466,082	10,801,270	12	260,910	354	93
10	Dutch	nl	1,057,369	1,345,376	5,672,801	6	68,214	98	7

For a complete list with totals see Wikimedia Statistics:

== Critical reception ==
Early critical reception of Wiktionary was mixed. In 2006, Jill Lepore wrote in the article "Noah's Mark" for The New Yorker,

There's no show of hands at Wiktionary. There's not even an editorial staff. "Be your own lexicographer!", might be Wiktionary's motto. Who needs experts? Why pay good money for a dictionary written by lexicographers when we could cobble one together ourselves? Wiktionary isn't so much republican or democratic as Maoist. And it's only as good as the copyright-expired books from which it pilfers.

Keir Graff's review for Booklist was less critical:

Is there a place for Wiktionary? Undoubtedly. The industry and enthusiasm of its many creators are proof that there's a market. And it's wonderful to have another strong source to use when searching the odd terms that pop up in today's fast-changing world and the online environment. But as with so many Web sources (including this column), it's best used by sophisticated users in conjunction with more reputable sources.

References in other publications are fleeting and part of larger discussions of Wikipedia, not progressing beyond a definition, although David Brooks in The Nashua Telegraph described it as "wild and woolly". One of the impediments to independent coverage of Wiktionary is the continuing confusion that it is merely an extension of Wikipedia. (Note: In this citation, the author refers to Wiktionary as part of the Wikipedia site: Adapted from an article by Naomi DeTullio (2006). "Wikis for Librarians" (PDF). NETLS News #142. Northeast Texas Library System. p. 15. Archived from the original (PDF newsletter) on June 5, 2007.)

The measure of correctness of the inflections for a subset of the Polish words in the English Wiktionary showed that this grammatical data is very stable (a study showed that only 131 out of 4,748 Polish words have had their inflection data corrected).

As of 2016, Wiktionary has seen growing use in academia. In the February 2024 edition of Nature, the relation between CEFR vocabulary level and user interest in English Wiktionary entries has been assessed.

== Wiktionary data in natural language processing ==
Wiktionary has semi-structured data. Wiktionary lexicographic data can be converted to machine-readable format in order to be used in natural language processing tasks.

Wiktionary's data mining is a complex task. There are the following difficulties:

- (1) the constant and frequent changes to data and schemata
- (2) the heterogeneity in Wiktionary language edition schemata (Note: E.g. compare the entry structure and formatting rules in English Wiktionary and Russian Wiktionary.) and
- (3) the human-centric nature of a wiki.

There are several parsers for different Wiktionary language editions:

- DBpedia Wiktionary : a subproject of DBpedia, the data are extracted from English, French, German, and Russian Wiktionaries; the data includes language, parts of speech, definitions, semantic relations and translations. The declarative description of the page schema, regular expressions and finite state transducer are used in order to extract information.
- JWKTL (Java Wiktionary Library) : provides access to English Wiktionary and German Wiktionary dumps via a Java Wiktionary API. The data includes language, parts of speech, definitions, quotations, semantic relations, etymologies and translations. JWKTL is distributed under the Apache License.
- wikokit : the parser of English Wiktionary and Russian Wiktionary. The parsed data includes language, parts of speech, definitions, quotations, (Note: Quotations are extracted only from Russian Wiktionary.) semantic relations and translations. This is a multi-licensed open-source software.
- Etymological entries have been parsed in the Etymological WordNet project.

Examples of natural language processing tasks which have used Wiktionary data include:

- Rule-based machine translation between Dutch language and Afrikaans; data of English Wiktionary, Dutch Wiktionary and Wikipedia were used with the Apertium machine translation platform.
- Construction of machine-readable dictionary by the parser NULEX, which integrates open linguistic resources: English Wiktionary, WordNet, and VerbNet. The parser NULEX scrapes English Wiktionary for tense information (verbs), plural form and parts of speech (nouns).
- Speech recognition and synthesis, where Wiktionary was used to automatically create pronunciation dictionaries. Word-pronunciation pairs were retrieved from 6 Wiktionary language editions (Czech, English, French, Spanish, Polish, and German). Pronunciations are in terms of the International Phonetic Alphabet. (Note: If there are several IPA notations on a Wiktionary page – either for different languages or for pronunciation variants, then the first pronunciation was extracted.) The ASR system based on English Wiktionary has the highest word error rate, where each third phoneme has to be changed.
- Ontology engineering and semantic network constructing.
- Ontology matching.
- Text simplification. Medero & Ostendorf assessed vocabulary difficulty (reading level detection) with the help of Wiktionary data. Properties of words extracted from Wiktionary entries (definition length and POS, sense, and translation counts) were investigated. Medero & Ostendorf expected that
  - (1) very common words will be more likely to have multiple parts of speech,
  - (2) common words will be more likely to have multiple senses,
  - (3) common words will be more likely to have been translated into multiple languages. These features extracted from Wiktionary entries were useful in distinguishing word types that appear in Simple English Wikipedia articles from words that only appear in the Standard English comparable articles.
- Part-of-speech tagging. Li et al. (2012) built multilingual POS-taggers for eight resource-poor languages on the basis of English Wiktionary and hidden Markov models. (Note: The source code and the results of POS-tagging are available at https://code.google.com/p/wikily-supervised-pos-tagger)
- Sentiment analysis.

A page called "Wikidata:Lexicographical data" was started in 2018 to provide structured data support to Wiktionaries. It stores word data of all languages in a machine readable data model, under a dedicated "Lexeme" namespace in Wikidata. As of October 2021, the project has amassed over 600,000 lexeme entries of various languages.

== See also ==
- Lingua Libre
