= Senator Reardon =

Senator Reardon may refer to:

- Aaron Reardon (politician) (born 1970s), Washington State Senate
- Keiron Reardon (1900–1978), Washington State Senate
