= Keiron =

Keiron is a given name. It can be a variant form of Ciarán. Notable people with the name include:

- Keiron Bigby (born 1966), former American football wide receiver
- Keiron Cunningham (born 1976), Welsh professional rugby league coach and former player
- Keiron Jenkins (born 1987), Welsh rugby union player
- Keiron O'Loughlin, English former professional rugby league footballer
- Keiron Reardon (1900–1978), American politician in the state of Washington
- Keiron Self (born 1971), Welsh actor and writer, played Roger Bailey Jr. in the BBC sitcom My Family

== See also ==
- Keir
- Keirin
- Keiron: The First Voyager, 1995 Australian film
- Kheiron
