= Keirn =

Keirn is a surname. Notable people with the surname include:

- Richard P. Keirn (1924–2000), US Air Force officer
- Steve Keirn (born 1951), American wrestler

== See also ==
- Keir
