= The Last Door (disambiguation) =

The Last Door is an episodic psychological horror graphic adventure video game.

The Last Door may also refer to:

- The Last Door (film), a 1921 American silent film
- The Last Door (comic book), a 2023 volume featuring the Scarlet Witch
- "The Last Door" (Quantum Leap), a 1992 television episode, the third part of "Trilogy"
