= Chyron (disambiguation) =

Chyron may refer to:

- Lower third, text and other graphics added to the bottom of a television broadcast
- Chyron Corporation, broadcast graphics company after which the generic term is taken

== See also ==
- Cheiron Studios, a music studio in Sweden
- Chiron (disambiguation)
- Khyron, a villain in the TV series Robotech
- Kiron (disambiguation)
- Kyron (disambiguation)
