= Hilda Vukikomoala =

Fijian chess player (born 1995)

Personal information
- Born: 1995 (age 30–31)

Chess career
- Country: Fiji
- Title: Woman FIDE Master (2013)
- Peak rating: 1658 (March 2024)

Hilda Vukikomoala (born 1995) is a Fijian chess player, who holds the International Chess Federation title of Woman FIDE Master (WFM). She is also President of the Fiji Chess Federation.

== Career ==
In 2012, 2014 and 2016, Vukikomoala took part in the Chess Olympiads with the Fijian women's national team. She scored 9 points out of 29 games. In 2013 she was awarded the title of Woman FIDE Master for her achievements at the Oceania Zone Tournament (Asia Zone 3.6) in Nadi (Fiji). She became the first Fijian woman with a FIDE championship title, after the Australian Kieran Lyons who played for Fiji. In 2015 she became the national champion of Fiji. Much of Vukikomoala's training involved playing computer chess, due to a shortage of strong opponents in Fiji.

In 2018 she and Junior Valentine received the 2018 IOC Olympism in Action on behalf of the Fiji Association of Sports and NOC (FASANOC)’s Voices of the Athletes (VOA) programme. In 2019 she came second in the Fiji Chess National Championship, losing to Gloria Sukhu. As of 2020, Vukikomoala was President of the Fiji Chess Federation, having previously served as secretary. She was also the Chair of the Athlete's Commission for FASANOC.
