= Kiron =

Kiron may refer to:

- Kiron, Iowa, small city in Crawford County, Iowa, United States
- Kiron Lenses
- Kiron, Alberta, a locality in Camrose County, Alberta, Canada
- Kiron Skinner (born 1961), American political writer
- Old Kiron, Iowa, ghost town, United States

== See also ==
- Cheiron Studios, a music studio in Sweden
- Chiron (disambiguation)
- Chyron (disambiguation)
- Khyron, a villain in the TV series Robotech
- Kyron (disambiguation)
