= George F. McAulay =

American politician from Washington

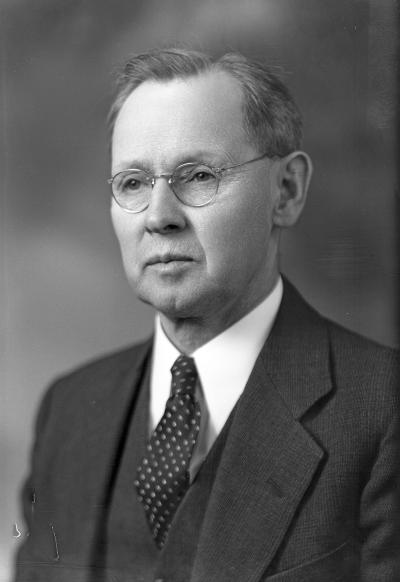
- McAulay in 1935

President pro tempore of the Washington Senate
- In office January 11, 1937 – January 9, 1939
- Preceded by: Ed Pierce
- Succeeded by: Keiron Reardon

Member of the Washington Senate from the 14th district
- In office January 14, 1935 – January 13, 1941
- Preceded by: D. V. Morthland
- Succeeded by: G. Dowe McQuesten

Personal details
- Born: October 9, 1870 Michigan, U.S.
- Died: March 8, 1941 (aged 70) Yakima, Washington, U.S.
- Party: Democratic

George F. McAulay (October 9, 1879 – March 8, 1941) was an American politician in the state of Washington. He served in the Washington State Senate from 1935 to 1941. From 1937 to 1939, he was president pro tempore of the Senate.
