= Calvin Prasad =

Fijian chess player (born 1980)

Personal information
- Born: March 11, 1980 (age 46)

Chess career
- Country: Fiji
- Title: Candidate Master (2009)
- Peak rating: 2028 (October 2012)

Calvin Prasad (born March 11, 1980) is an Indo-Fijian chess player. He is the first male chess player to earn a Candidate Master (CM) title for the small chess community of Fiji.

== Career ==
He has represented Fiji four times in international tournaments, in 2003 at the Fiji Invitational Chess Championships, in 2004 at the Zonal Championships in Auckland, New Zealand, and twice at the Chess Olympiad, (Mallorca 2004 and Turin 2006).

He is also a Former National Champion (2004) of Fiji and has had many tournament victories. He is the defending champion of the Kundan Singh Open Chess Championship.

For the past 4 years, he has also served on the management board of the Fiji Chess Federation, of which he is currently the vice-president.

Prasad was voted the National Male Athlete of 2006.

In 2011, Prasad won the Fiji National Chess Championships and became Fiji National Chess Champion. He last won this title in 2004. Prasad was also awarded the '2011 Player of the Year Award'.2011 Player of the Year award went to last year's national champion CM Calvin Prasad

== Professional ==
Calvin Prasad is an AI & Digital specialist based in Suva, Fiji. He is currently a Digital Media Specialist with Fijian Broadcasting Corporation and an External Academic with University of the South Pacific.
