= Keir =

Keir is a surname and given name shortened from Keiron. Notable people with the name include:

== Surname ==
- Andrew Keir (1926–1997), Scottish actor
- Colin Keir (born 1959), Scottish politician
- David Keir (1884–1971), British actor
- David Lindsay Keir (1895–1973), British historian
- Jack Keir (born 1957 or 1958), Canadian politician
- James Keir (1735–1820), Scottish scientist
- John Keir (1856–1937), British Army officer
- Leitch Keir (1861–1922), Scottish footballer
- Mary Keir (1912–2024), Welsh supercentenarian
- Nick Keir (1953–2013), Scottish musician

== Given name ==
- Keir Clark (1910–2010), Canadian politician
- Keir Dillon (born 1977), American snowboarder
- Keir Dullea (born 1936), American actor
- Keir Foster (born 2004), Scottish footballer
- Keir Gilchrist (born 1992), Canadian actor
- Keir Giles (born 1968), British writer
- Keir Graff (born 1969), American writer
- Keir Hardie (1856–1915), Scottish socialist, first leader of the UK Labour Party
- Keir Mather (born 1998), British politician
- Keir Nuttall (born 1975), Australian musician
- Keir O'Donnell (born 1978), Australian actor
- Keir Pearson (born 1966), American screenwriter
- Keir Simmons (born 1972), British journalist
- Keir Starmer (born 1962), former Prime Minister of the United Kingdom
- Keir Thomas (born 1998), American football player
