= Chiron (beetle) =

Scientific classification
- Kingdom: Animalia
- Phylum: Arthropoda
- Clade: Pancrustacea
- Class: Insecta
- Order: Coleoptera
- Suborder: Polyphaga
- Infraorder: Scarabaeiformia
- Family: Scarabaeidae
- Subfamily: Chironinae
- Genus: Chiron; Macleay, 1819

Synonyms
- Passalus Illiger, 1801; Scarites Fabricius, 1798; Sinodendron Fabricius, 1792

Genus of beetles

Chiron is a genus of scarab beetles in the family Scarabaeidae. There are about 15 described species in Chiron, found in Africa and Asia.

== Species ==
These 15 species belong to the genus Chiron:

- Chiron aberlenci Huchet, 2019 ((Cameroon, Chad, Niger))
- Chiron assamensis Hope, 1845 (India)
- Chiron bartolozzii Huchet, 2019 (Somalia)
- Chiron cylindrus (Fabricius, 1798) (Palearctic, Afrotropical, India)
- Chiron demirei Huchet, 2019 (Afrotropical)
- Chiron elegans Huchet, 2020 (Afrotropical)
- Chiron hovanus Fairmaire, 1901 (Madagascar)
- Chiron kelleri Fairmaire, 1893 (Somalia)
- Chiron lucifer Huchet, 2019 (Afrotropical)
- Chiron mariannae Huchet, 2019 (Afrotropical)
- Chiron massaicus Huchet, 2019 (Afrotropical)
- Chiron oddurensis Huchet, 2019 (Somalia)
- Chiron senegalensis Hope, 1845 (Senegal)
- Chiron stuempkei Huchet, 2019 (Afrotropical)
- Chiron volvulus Klug, 1855 (Mozambique)
