= Chiron cylindrus =

Scientific classification
- Kingdom: Animalia
- Phylum: Arthropoda
- Class: Insecta
- Order: Coleoptera
- Suborder: Polyphaga
- Infraorder: Scarabaeiformia
- Family: Scarabaeidae
- Genus: Chiron
- Species: C. cylindrus

Binomial name
- Chiron cylindrus (Fabricius, 1798)

Synonyms
- Scarites cylindrus Fabricius, 1798; Passalus cylindrus Hliger, 1801; Chiron digitatus Castelnau, 1840; Chiron cylindrus Paulian, 1954; Sinodendron digitatum Fabricius, 1801; Passalus cylindrus Illiger, 1801

Species of beetle

Chiron cylindrus is a species of true dung beetle widely distributed from Myanmar to Sri Lanka and towards tropical Africa.

== Description ==
Average length is about 9 to 11 mm.

Adults are frequently observed in the 1st and 2nd weeks of September where both the larvae as well as adults feed on dung.
