= Disappearance of Kyran Durnin =

Unsolved 2024 Irish missing-person case

Kyran Durnin
- One of the last known photographs of Durnin, taken in June 2022.
- Disappeared: June 1, 2022 (aged 6); Drogheda
- Status: Missing for 4 years, 5 months and 5 days

In August 2024, Kyran Durnin, a six‑year‑old from Dundalk, County Louth, was reported missing to Gardaí. The last confirmed sighting of him was in June 2022.

A murder investigation was launched in October 2024 after authorities received information suggesting that he had died at some point in the previous two years. Despite suspects being questioned and several properties searched by forensic teams, no trace of Durnin was found, and Garda inquiries have continued.

== Background ==
In late May 2022, Durnin's mother, Dayla, told his primary school in Dundalk that he was in hospital with COVID-19 and would be absent for several weeks. In June 2022, the family informed the school that they were moving to Newry in Northern Ireland and that Durnin would not be returning after the summer holidays. Although Durnin was said to have left the jurisdiction, it is believed that social welfare and child benefits continued to be paid to his mother by the Department of Social Protection.

Tusla had previous engagements with the family and had reported finding the home "in squalor." Attempts by Tusla to visit the house between 2022 and 2024 were unsuccessful as the door was not answered. In May 2024, the family moved out of their house at Emer Terrace in Dundalk.

In early 2024, child welfare officials became concerned about the family and sought a face-to-face meeting. During their engagement with relatives, new information arose that caused concern about Durnin's whereabouts. A meeting took place in mid‑July 2024 with the family and a child understood by officials to be Durnin, with another meeting held in early August 2024.

== Missing person investigation ==
On 29 August 2024, Rhonda Byrne Tyson, Durnin's maternal grandmother, contacted Tusla with concerns about Dayla and Durnin, as both had gone missing from the house they shared. Tyson was advised to notify Gardaí, and Tusla also reported the matter to Garda officials. The next day, Tyson filed a missing-person report at Drogheda garda station, stating that she had last seen her daughter and her grandson around two days earlier. In early September 2024, Gardaí issued a public appeal for information on the whereabouts of Dayla and Durnin.

On 24 September 2024, Tyson gave an interview to the Drogheda Life newspaper about the disappearance of Dayla and Durnin from her house in Hand Street the previous month. Dayla's other children, Laseigh and Isla, were asleep upstairs while Dayla and Durnin were on a downstairs sofa. Tyson last saw them around 11 pm. The next morning, both were gone, and Dayla had left a note saying she needed to "get away for a few days". Tyson alleged she had been trying to call Dayla's mobile phone since, but her calls went straight to voicemail.

Subsequent Garda inquiries confirmed that Dayla had traveled to England via Northern Ireland. Investigations into Durnin's whereabouts found no evidence that he was admitted to hospital in 2022 with COVID-19, nor that he had attended any school in Northern Ireland. Gardaí also established that the child who attended the Tusla meetings with Dayla was not Durnin.

== Murder investigation ==
On 17 October 2024, Gardaí upgraded Durnin's disappearance to a murder investigation after receiving information that he was dead and finding no evidence that he was alive. Inquiries also found no record of Christmas or birthday presents being bought for him in the previous two years. Analysis of food orders made in Dundalk and Drogheda in the summer of 2022 showed a pattern of daily meals, with one meal no longer appearing after a certain point, suggesting that Durnin was no longer present. Tusla records relating to him were lost in the 2021 HSE ransomware attack. The last confirmed sighting of Durnin was in late May 2022, when he was a senior infants pupil at St Nicholas Monastery national school in Dundalk.

On 22 October 2024, Garda forensic teams searched a house on Emer Terrace in Dundalk previously occupied by the family, but found nothing of evidential value. Gardaí later established that a boy with the same name and date of birth as Durnin had been booked into emergency accommodation for four weeks in Dundalk in the summer of 2024. This was believed to be an attempt to mislead authorities, as staff at the guesthouse did not recognise Durnin when shown his photograph. Gardaí obtained a court order to preserve social media accounts linked to persons of interest and examined their posts for information. Online activity relating to Durnin, including photographs and references to him, appeared to stop abruptly in the summer of 2022.

In early October 2024, Dayla was located in East Anglia after Gardaí asked UK authorities to check on her welfare, however Durnin was not with her. Dayla told police she did not know his whereabouts or anything about the circumstances of his disappearance. Media reports later stated that she alleged to have left Ireland due to concerns for her own safety and had settled in Ipswich.

On 10 December 2024, a woman in her 20s, described in some Irish media as a key suspect, was arrested by Gardaí after arriving by ferry from overseas. She was released without charge after 24 hours of questioning and returned to her home in the United Kingdom. On the same day, BBC Spotlight broadcast a documentary on the disappearance of Durnin, highlighting discrepancies between his grandmother's public appeal and Garda statements about the last confirmed sighting. The programme also showed a BBC journalist attempting to question Tyson at her house, but she declined to engage.

On 12 December 2024, Gardaí arrested Anthony Maguire on suspicion of Durnin's murder. Forensic teams searched his house in Drogheda with the aid of a cadaver dog and excavated the back garden. Media reports stated that Maguire had previously been in a relationship with the main suspect and was suspected of helping present a "decoy" child at Tusla meetings. He was released without charge after 24 hours, and on 17 December 2024 he was found dead at his home, reportedly having died by suicide.

On 19 December 2024, Gardaí released the last known photograph of Durnin recovered from a mobile phone seized during the investigation. Data indicated it was taken in early June 2022 and was geotagged to the Drogheda area. A few days later, reporters approached Dayla in Ipswich, but she declined to answer questions and entered Portman Road stadium.

On 26 February 2025, Garda forensic teams searched a house on Hand Street in Drogheda for evidence relating to the suspected murder of Durnin. Excavation work was carried out in the back garden. Media reports described the property as belonging to a person known to Durnin and identified as a long‑standing person of interest.

On 25 May 2026, a woman in her 50s was arrested in relation to Durnin's murder, and Gardaí searched a house on Hand Street. while a house on Hand Street in Drogheda was also searched by Garda officers. Media reports stated that the woman was known to Durnin and had previously been spoken to by authorities, and that he had lived at the property. She was released without charge after 24 hours of questioning.
