= Keiron Reardon =

American politician

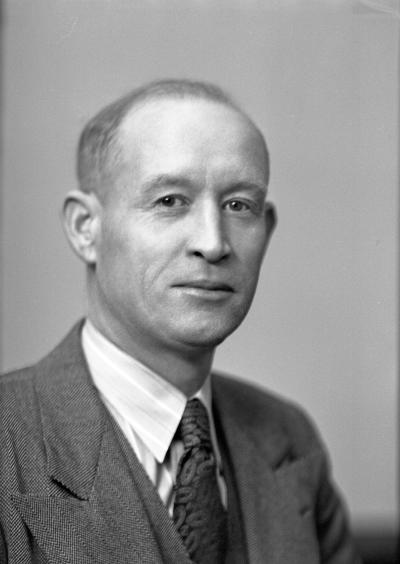
- Reardon in 1937

President pro tempore of the Washington Senate
- In office January 9, 1939 – January 13, 1941
- Preceded by: George F. McAulay
- Succeeded by: George A. Lovejoy

Member of the Washington Senate from the 39th district
- In office January 8, 1945 – January 10, 1949
- Preceded by: William P. Mulligan
- Succeeded by: Ray J. Hutchinson
- In office January 11, 1943 – February 19, 1944
- Preceded by: Patrick Crane
- Succeeded by: William P. Mulligan
- In office January 9, 1933 – January 13, 1941
- Preceded by: George Murphy
- Succeeded by: Lenus Westman

Personal details
- Born: Keiron William Reardon; May 8, 1900 U.S.
- Died: February 4, 1978 (aged 77) Washington, U.S.
- Party: Democratic

Keiron William Reardon (May 8, 1900 – February 4, 1978) was an American politician in the state of Washington. He served in the Washington State Senate from 1933 to 1941, from 1943 to 1944, and from 1945 to 1949. From 1939 to 1941, he was President pro tempore of the Senate.
