= Kyron (given name) =

Kyron is a masculine given name. Notable people with the name include:

- Kyron Brown (born 1996), American football player
- Kyron Cartwright (born 1996), American professional basketball player
- Kyron Drones (born 2003), American football player
- Kyron Duke (born 1992), Welsh powerlifter
- Kyron Farrell (born 1996), English footballer
- Kyron Gordon (born 2002), English footballer
- Kyron Hayden (born 1999), Australian rules footballer
- Kyron Horman (born 2002), American missing person
- Kyron Hudson (born 2002), American football player
- Kyron Johnson (born 1998), American football player
- Kyron Lynch (born 1981), Trinidadian cricketer
- Kyron McMaster (born 1997), British athlete
- Kyron Stabana (born 1998), English footballer
- Kyron Sullivan (born 1976), Welsh golfer
