= USS Chiron =

United States motor torpedo boat tender

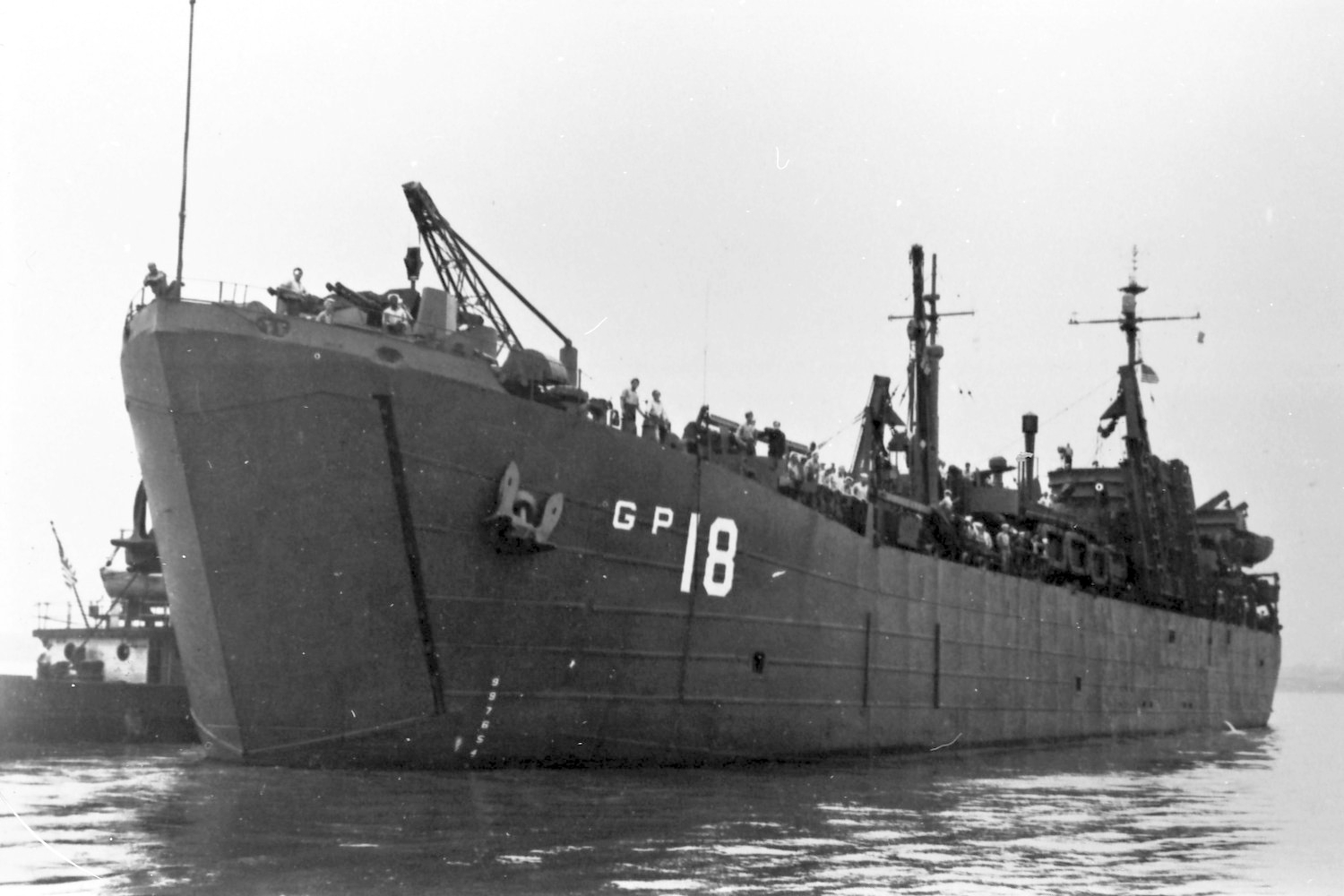
- Chiron, circa 1945.

History

United States
- Name: LST-1133
- Renamed: USS Chiron, 14 August 1944
- Namesake: A centaur of Greek mythology, known for his skill in medicine
- Reclassified: Motor torpedo boat tender, AGP-18, 14 August 1944
- Builder: Chicago Bridge & Iron Company, Seneca, Illinois
- Laid down: 16 December 1944
- Launched: 10 March 1945
- Sponsored by: Mrs. T. S. Tillman
- Commissioned: 23 March 1945 (reduced commission as tank landing ship)
- Decommissioned: 17 April 1945
- Notes: Converted to motor torpedo boat tender at Maryland Drydock Company, Baltimore, Maryland
- Recommissioned: 18 September 1945
- Decommissioned: 20 February 1946
- Stricken: 28 March 1946
- Identification: Ship International Radio Callsign: NJZF
- Fate: Sold 19 May 1947

Argentina
- Name: MV Altamar
- Acquired: 19 May 1947
- In service: By 1948
- Fate: Sank 30 March 1960

General characteristics (as motor torpedo boat tender)
- Displacement: 4,100 tons
- Length: 328 ft (100 m)
- Beam: 50 ft (15 m)
- Draft: 11 ft 2 in (3.4 m)
- Propulsion: 2 × General Motors 12-568A diesel engines
- Speed: 11.6 knots (21.5 km/h; 13.3 mph)
- Complement: 41 officers, 265 enlisted men
- Armament: 2 × quad 40 mm AA gun mounts; 8 × single 20 mm AA gun mounts

USS Chiron (AGP-18) was a Portunus-class motor torpedo boat tender which saw brief service with the United States Navy during and just after World War II. She then served as the Argentinian merchant ship MV Altamar until she sank in 1960.

== Construction and commissioning ==
Authorized as the LST-542-class tank landing ship USS LST-1133, the ship was reclassified as a motor torpedo boat tender, assigned the hull number AGP-18, and renamed USS Chiron on 14 August 1944. Chiron was laid down by the Chicago Bridge and Iron Company at Seneca, Illinois, on 16 December 1944, launched on 10 March 1945, sponsored by Mrs. T. S. Tillman, and placed in reduced commission on 23 March 1945 for transit to her conversion yard. On 17 April 1945, she was decommissioned for her conversion into a motor torpedo boat tender. Her conversion took place at the Maryland Drydock Company at Baltimore, Maryland, and after its completion, she was recommissioned USS Chiron (AGP-18).

== Service history ==
=== United States Navy ===
Chiron departed Norfolk, Virginia, on 1 November 1945 bound for Miami, Florida, where she arrived on 4 November 1945 to service the PT boats of Motor Torpedo Squadron 42 until 8 December 1945. On 14 December 1945 she got underway for New York City, where she was decommissioned on 20 February 1946 after only five months and 27 days in naval service. She was stricken from the Naval Vessel Register on 28 March 1946.

=== Commercial service ===
On 19 May 1947, Chiron was sold to commercial interests in Argentina. By 1948 she was serving as a merchant ship under the Argentinian flag with the name MV Altamar. She sank on 30 March 1960 during a voyage from Cabedelo to Belém, Brazil, with a cargo of grain. Her wreck was found in the Atlantic Ocean off the northeastern coast of Brazil on Manoel Luis Reef at 00°46′S 044°20′W.

== Honors and awards ==
During her U.S. Navy service, Chiron received the following awards:

- American Campaign Medal
- World War II Victory Medal
