= The Last Door =

2013 video game

- Developer: The Game Kitchen
- Publisher: The Game Kitchen
- Composer: Carlos Viola
- Engine: Adobe AIR (The Last Door); Unity (The Last Door: Season 2)
- Platforms: Android, iOS, Microsoft Windows, macOS, Linux, Windows Phone, Nintendo Switch, PlayStation 4, Xbox One
- Release: 2013-2016
- Genre: Graphic adventure
- Mode: Single-player

The Last Door is an episodic psychological horror graphic adventure video game developed and published by The Game Kitchen for the Android, iOS, Microsoft Windows, Mac OS and Linux platforms. As of January 2016, eight episodes have been released. A collector's edition of the first season was released in May 2014 by Phoenix Online Publishing, featuring new content.

The plot revolves around four childhood friends, of which the player controls Jeremiah Devitt (and later his psychiatrist, Doctor Wakefield), who attempt to explore a supernatural territory/phenomenon known as the Veil. The story takes place long after the friends have separated, and Devitt is summoned by his old friend Anthony Beechworth's last words to investigate the mysterious supernatural forces that now threaten them all.

== Gameplay ==
Jeremiah Devitt in a Victorian-era boarding school in Episode 2, with inventory panel visible

As a point-and-click adventure, the player controls the character, moves him through various locations, picks up and uses items to move the story forward, and solves puzzles. Red herrings are rare, with each item generally having a single use. Episodes start out with a number of locked areas, which can be unlocked by finding keys and using other items to expand the explorable world. In episodes 1, 2, and 3 of the Season 2 a larger, map based world was introduced, giving players the ability to open a map to travel to different regions or areas of the overall map, and then being able to explore the area selected on foot. This feature is absent in the final instalment of Season Two, "Beyond the Curtain."

In terms of interface, The Last Door is a fairly typical third-person point-and-click adventure. A smart cursor shows hotspots that can be looked at, picked up or interacted with. It also shows exits from the current screen; double-clicking one instantly moves you to the next. The inventory is shown at the bottom of the screen where you can combine items occasionally, and there is a magnifying glass that gives descriptions of each item you’ve acquired. There are lots of doors in the game, as the title suggests, and doors stay open to signify unlocked areas.

— Katie Smith, The Last Door Review, Adventure Gamers

Although the abstract graphics naturally make identifying specific details difficult prior to Devitt’s guidance—such as the fact that a painting is a portrait of Beechworth—locating the interactive objects in each small room is never too challenging, and never feels like a hunt and peck quest. The puzzles, and their required implementation of those objects, are similarly straightforward, with the most complicated solutions requiring no more than three items.

— Jillian Werner, The Last Door: Chapter 1 – The Letter Review, Gamezebo

== Development ==
The Last Door was crowdfunded on Kickstarter in December 2012, and the first episode was released in March 2013, with three more to follow. Each new episode could be unlocked by a donation of any size, creating a successful ongoing financial model that allowed them to complete the series.

The game was inspired by works from Edgar Allan Poe and H. P. Lovecraft. The soundtrack of all episodes was composed and arranged by Carlos Viola. The Game Kitchen lets the community hold an important place in the development of each episode, with select players playing through beta versions and helping the team by finding bugs, contributing in-game text, and suggesting improvements.

The game was developed episodically from 2013 until 2016. In late 2015 it was announced that the series would end with the finale of Season 2 because the game was not generating enough income for The Game Kitchen, and the developers wanted to move onto another, hopefully more successful endeavour in order to save the business. The series finale was released in January 2016, marking the end of The Last Door saga. The developers have said that the finale is not necessarily the end of The Last Door, as they may choose to reopen the project at a later time, when it is more realistic for the company.

In June 2015 The Game Kitchen released the assets of season one under the CC BY 4.0 Creative Commons license.

== Reception ==
Reception

Aggregate scores
Aggregator	Score
GameRankings	75.50/100
Metacritic	79/100

Review scores
Publication	Score
Adventure Gamers	4/5
GamesMaster	84/100
GameSpot	7/10
IGN	8.5/10
Darkstation	90/100
Gamefront	80/100

The game has been well received by critics and fans of the genre, and has been variously described as "Simple but effective", "a great, chilling narrative experience", and that "apart from ever-building dread, there are a few great popcorn-tossing moments mixed throughout".

Its puzzles were described as "generally rewarding and solvable", and that "its graphical style works to help make the game feel strange or otherworldly". The plot was "able to give some chills", but was considered a cliffhanger ending by some reviewers.

=== Awards ===
The game received numerous awards, including:

- "Coolest Videogame" - Indie Burguer Development Awards 2014
- "Best Adventure Game 2013" - Armor Games
- "Top 10 Best Games of 2013" - Kongregate
- "Best Indie Game, Public Choice Award" - Rotor'scope - GameLab, Barcelona, 2010
- "2nd Prize DreamBuildPlay 2009" - Rotor'scope - Microsoft XNA Contest, 2009
- "Best Gameplay" - Rotor'scope - ArtFutura, Barcelona, 2009

=== Reviews ===
Carolyn Petit of GameSpot praised the engrossing gameplay and suggestive graphics:

The Last Door exhibits a few frustrating relics of adventure game design, but it also weaves an unsettling tale of insanity and psychological horror. But this web-based adventure game is off to a promisingly frightening start. The Last Door is all the more engrossing for the ways in which its visuals encourage your own imagination to play a part in creating its horrors.

— Carolyn Petit, The Last Door Review, GameSpot

Adam Smith of the Rock, Paper, Shotgun online magazine praised the crowdfunding model:

The Last Door's approach to crowdfunding is elegant. Seriously, it is. Good for the game and great for the audience. By releasing episodically, The Game Kitchen are effectively telling a story and shaking the can for tips at the end of each chapter to see if people are willing to pay for more. And the audience is happy to cough up the cash.

— Adam Smith, Open For Business: The Last Door Season One Ends, Rock, Paper, Shotgun

Jillian Werner of Gamezebo praised the soundtrack and music:

While every detail of The Letter is perfectly arranged to immerse players in this tragic story, the music and sound effects create the strongest pull. The exquisite orchestral soundtrack, while an original work by Carlos Viola, could just as easily be an undiscovered composition by Chopin. Select tracks, like "A House in Silence," provide short glimpses of the scientific and occult plot points that are only briefly hinted at in this chapter. The house itself—though silent by Devitt’s account—speaks volumes in its creaky floors, drafty windows, and other ambient sounds, like a crow tapping on a glass window.

— Jillian Werner, The Last Door: Chapter 1 – The Letter Review, Gamezebo

Katie Smith of Adventure Gamers praised the "retro" feel of the graphics:

The Last Door is a great retro atmospheric horror game that will make you want to keep opening up its mysteries until you reach the end. Retro pixel art and sound work great together to create a spooky Victorian era atmosphere and plenty of chills; interesting supernatural horror story; good variety of locations to explore. The graphics are distinctly retro, and the blocky textures and low resolution will probably turn off gamers who demand only the newest graphic technology. However, the pixel art works well for this type of game. As with Lovecraft, this game is all about suggestion, not showing what frightens us but rather letting hints stimulate the imagination.

— Katie Smith, The Last Door Review, Adventure Gamers

== Plot ==
Season 1
Jeremiah Devitt receives a mysterious letter from his old friend Anthony Beechworth and immediately rushes to his friend's aid, only to find out that the latter had committed suicide shortly after sending the letter. Anthony warns Devitt that a terrible supernatural force now plagues him and all of their friends, and Devitt must investigate at once before it's too late. Devitt returns to an old boarding school where he and Anthony originally met, and slowly remembers his days helping Anthony running a small secret organization that attempted to explore a supernatural territory known as the Veil in an effort to seek "truth". To do this, they had developed a special serum that would allow the user's mind to enter a higher state of consciousness, which from there they can cross the Veil. While investigating, Devitt gets attacked and buried alive, but is later rescued by local nuns. While recovering from the ordeal, he recalls another member of their organization, Alexandre Du Pré, and promptly goes to him for answers. Alexandre reveals that he had been very invested in exploring the Veil even after they all went about their separate ways. Alexandre then requests that Devitt joins him in crossing the Veil together. Devitt agrees, and then disappears.

Season 2
Doctor John Wakefield, Devitt's former psychiatrist, is troubled by Devitt's sudden disappearance. He travels with his colleague, Herr Doctor Johann Kaufmann, an enigmatic German gentleman who assisted Wakefield in researching Devitt's condition, in an effort to find Devitt. Kaufmann appears to have a high degree of understanding of the dark forces that affect Devitt, but he keeps most of this knowledge to himself. Together they set out to find out what happened to Devitt. They reach a mental hospital in London, where they find out that Alexandre Du Pré had been running a large organization known as The Playwright, whose sole purpose was to explore the Veil. They then venture to the home of Adam Wright, an expert on the occult. Here, Wright dies under mysterious circumstances and Kaufmann comes down with an illness and dies. Wakefield, stricken with grief by the death of his friend, resolves to continue his quest. He visits a sleepy fishing village on a secluded Irish island after learning about the island's mysterious past. Intrigued, he investigates the island's history further, eventually stumbling into a portal of sorts that leads to the Veil, the barren wasteland that separates our world from another, ancient world. Here, he encounters Devitt and learns that he, and not Anthony, was the true leader of the cult. However, he learns, Devitt was stricken with amnesia after an experiment gone wrong. Anthony only recently elected to bring him back to the group by setting him on his quest because he and Alexandre felt that they were close to crossing the Last Door. Wakefield finds out from Alexandre that Devitt has already crossed the Threshold to the other world and that he intends to use the "First Language" in order to harness the power of creation. However, he intends to destroy the work of the Playwright so that no one can ever open the Door again. The curtain that marks the threshold separating our world from the ancient one then slowly begins to close, and Alexandre implores Wakefield to choose to either stop Devitt, or let him go through with the plan.

Alternate Endings

From here, the game has at least two alternate endings. Wakefield can either travel through the curtain, or he can let the curtain close. Each triggers a unique ending to the game. If the player goes through the curtain, Wakefield sacrifices himself and takes Devitt's place. He stays behind to close The Last Door and is killed. Devitt then finds himself in a London street, where he returns home and burns evidence. If the player lets the curtain close, then Devitt is killed as he closes the Last Door. After closing it, Wakefield is transported to a London street and he finds his way home, before burning all remnants of his journey through the Veil. In both endings, the surviving characters makes a pact to "see that no one knows," reflecting the Playwright's motto, videte ne quis sciat. Additionally, both endings also feature those members of the Playwright who were in the Veil (including Alexandre) becoming trapped in the Veil, essentially rendering them nonexistent.

=== Characters ===
Jeremiah Devitt
A man living in England who had been sent to boarding school by his neglectful father after the death of his mother. There, he had co-founded the secret society that would be integral to the game's plot. When he receives a letter many years later from his childhood friend Anthony, his youthful actions come back to haunt him. He is one of "The Four Witnesses." Devitt is an extremely brave character almost to a fault. He pushes onward with his investigation into the Veil despite the severe risks. Devitt is a philosopher, and originally wanted to explore the Veil to find true philosophy. It is later revealed that Devitt was the one who spearheaded the founding of the student society, and that he was obsessed with crossing the veil, even more so than Anthony. However, during an experiment he is stricken with amnesia, until being summoned back to the society by his old friends, setting him on a path to rediscover his actions of the past.
Anthony Beechworth
A man who had attended the same boarding school as Devitt and had been instrumental in the founding of the secret student society. He had an insatiable curiosity, which drove his desire to explore the Veil in the first place, where he had hoped to find true science. He is charismatic and very amiable, having been the one to reach out to Devitt when the latter was struggling to cope with the loss of his mother and father's abandonment. He continued to work with Alexandre through mail even after leaving school on exploring the Veil, but later implies that their research may lead to severe widespread consequences. His research later in life ultimately drives him mad, and notes in his brief moments of lucidity that an unknown supernatural force, likely from the Veil, has completely corrupted him. He hangs himself shortly after writing a letter to Devitt. Although he was a founder of the society, he is not one of "The Four Witnesses", as he had been the one to inject the four subjects with his experimental serum.
Dr. John Wakefield, Ph.D.
Devitt's psychiatrist, who later takes it upon himself to find where Devitt has disappeared to. He is intelligent and loyal to his friends, forcing himself to face his own fears to maintain such loyalty.
Dr. Johann Kaufmann, Ph.D.
Kaufmann is a German scholar who seems to know much about the occult. He is kind and highly intelligent, but he is very enigmatic when it comes to revealing information to his partner. He dies of mysterious illness while visiting Wickport with Wakefield. It is later revealed that the companions of "travellers," in this case Dr. Wakefield, are often hunted by the guardian of the Last Door, and thus Kaufmann was targeted and struck down.
Alexandre Du Pré
One of the "Four Witnesses" and co-founder of the society. He later founded another society known as The Playwright, and he himself is then known as The Playwright. He continued to work with Anthony long after they left the boarding school and, like Anthony, showed signed of going mad as the research continued. While still alive, Alexandre mysteriously exists in two separate mental states simultaneously: a vegetative trance-like state and a normal functioning state, suggesting that he had long since crossed the Veil.
Father Ernest Glynn
One of "The Four Witnesses." Glynn had been a teacher and priest at the Aberdeen boarding school. After visiting the Veil for the first time, where he had hoped to find true religion, he becomes ill and subsequently is the reason why the boarding school shuts down. He continues to live in the school which now repurposed as monastery for many decades trying to return to the Veil by killing many patients as sacrifices, but ultimately concludes that had committed an unforgivable sin, and thus burns out his own eyes and constantly physically punishes himself. He commits suicide at the end of Season 1 Episode 2 by burning himself.
Francis "Frank" Baldwin
The groundskeeper of the monastery who was responsible for killing the patients by buried them alive under Father Ernest's orders and the one who attacked Jeremiah and attempted to bury him alive before the nuns saved him. He was later caught and executed by hanging in the extra episode "Death Sentence"
Hugo Ashdown
One of the "Four Witnesses", whose full history remains quite enigmatic. One of his family members, Lena Ashdown, had died at the Aberdeen hospital, which had been built on the site of the boarding school years later. He apparently participated in an experiment conducted by Professor Adam Wright and was transformed into a being from beyond the veil, residing underneath Professor Wright's home.
Professor Wright
An old mentor of Kaufmann living in Wickport. He is only ever seen in a heavy trance-like state, not at all unlike the one Alexandre had been in at his house when Devitt first finds him. He dies under mysterious circumstances while Wakefield and Kaufman are in Wickport investigating Devitt's disappearance.
Captain Skidd
Skidd is a veteran captain in the British Army. During the war in South Africa, he encounters the Simurg, the guardian of the threshold. He is later recruited by the Playwright in an attempt to cross the Veil.

== Episodes ==
Season 1

Chapter	Release date
Episode 1 – "The Letter"	March 15, 2013
Episode 2 – "Memories"	June 25, 2013
Episode 3 - "The Four Witnesses"	October 19, 2013
Episode 4 - "Ancient Shadows"	February 18, 2014

Season 2

Chapter	Release date
Episode 1 - "The Playwright"	October 31, 2014
Episode 2 - "My Dearest Visitor"	April 6, 2015
Episode 3 - "The Reunion"	August 17, 2015
Episode 4 - "Beyond the Curtain"	January 15, 2016
