= Kieran Lyons =

Fijian chess player (born 1989)

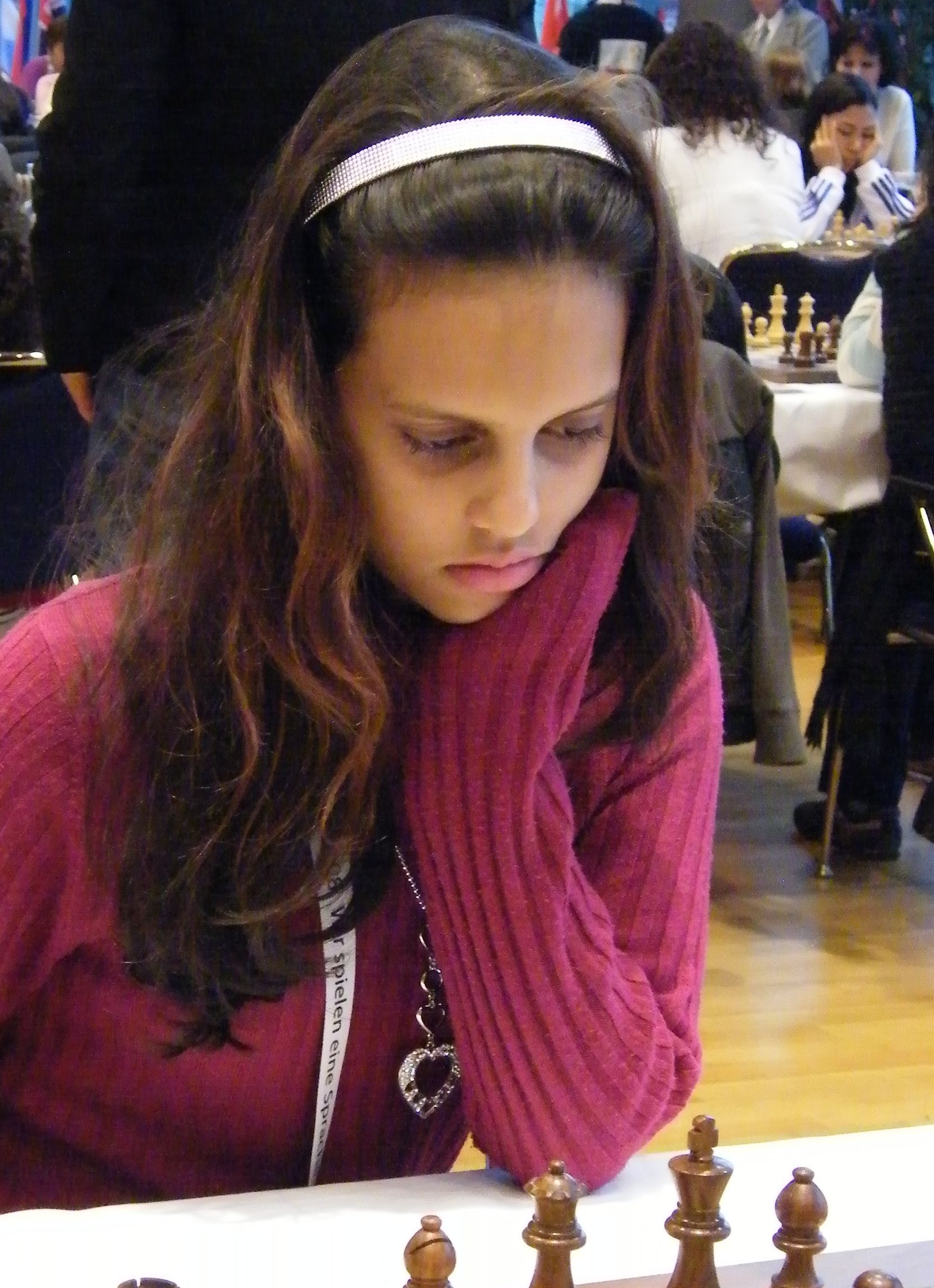
- Lyons in 2008

Personal information
- Born: December 24, 1989 (age 36)

Chess career
- Country: Fiji
- Title: Woman FIDE Master (2005)
- Peak rating: 1840 (July 2007)

Kieran Lyons (born 1989) is Fiji's top female chess player. She started playing in 2004 and became Woman's FIDE Master in 2005 when she participated at the 36th Chess Olympiad.

Kieran Lyons is also part of the World Chess Federation. In addition to being a member of The Gap Chess Club in Brisbane, Australia

She took part in the 2006, 2008, 2012, and 2014 in Women's Chess Olympiad for Fiji and won 32.5 points in 56 games.
